= Swimming at the 2014 Summer Youth Olympics – Mixed 4 × 100 metre medley relay =

Mixed 4 × 100 metre medley relay at the 2014 Summer Youth Olympics
- Venue: Nanjing Olympic Sports Centre
- Dates: 22 August
- Nations: 20
- Winning time: 3:49.33

Medalists
gold medal	Li Guangyuan; He Yun; Zhang Yufei; Yu Hexin; Qiu Yuhan; Zhang Zhihao; Li Zhuhao; Shen Duo	China
silver medal	Irina Prikhodko; Anton Chupkov; Aleksandr Sadovnikov; Daria S. Ustinova	Russia
bronze medal	Amy Forrester; Grayson Bell; Nicholas Brown; Ami Matsuo; Brianna Throssell; Kyle Chalmers	Australia

The mixed 4 × 100 metre medley relay event in swimming at the 2014 Summer Youth Olympics took place on 22 August at the Nanjing Olympic Sports Centre in Nanjing, China.

== Results ==
=== Heats ===
The heats were held at 11:06.

Rank	Heat	Lane	Name	Nationality	Time	Notes
1	3	1	Qiu Yuhan (1:02.93); Zhang Zhihao (1:02.85); Li Zhuhao (53.46); Shen Duo (54.77)	China	3:54.01	Q
2	3	8	Irina Prikhodko (1:02.91); Anton Chupkov (1:01.85); Aleksandr Sadovnikov (53.89); Daria S. Ustinova (56.06)	Russia	3:54.71	Q
3	3	4	Amy Forrester (1:02.89); Grayson Bell (1:02.82); Brianna Throssell (59.59); Kyle Chalmers (50.04)	Australia	3:55.34	Q
4	1	4	Nathania van Niekerk (1:04.41); Jarred Crous (1:01.74); Joshua Steyn (54.14); Marlies Ross (57.15)	South Africa	3:57.44	Q
5	3	6	Luke Greenbank (56.85); Georgina Evans (1:09.43); Charlotte Atkinson (1:01.99); Miles Munro (50.53)	Great Britain	3:58.80	Q
6	1	5	Laura Yus (1:02.90); Gonzalo Carazo (1:04.16); Guillermo Sánchez (55.99); África Zamorano (55.90)	Spain	3:58.95	Q
7	2	4	Natalia de Luccas (1:02.81); Andreas Mickosz (1:03.57); Giovanna Diamante (1:01.71); Matheus Santana (51.82)	Brazil	3:59.91	Q
8	2	5	Tereza Grusová (1:03.05); Vojtěch Simbartl (1:04.93); Lucie Svěcená (1:00.22); Petr Novak (52.07)	Czech Republic	4:00.27	Q
9	3	2	Koki Tsunefuka (59.17); Ippei Watanabe (1:01.38); Jurina Shiga (1:01.23); Rina Yoshimura (58.95)	Japan	4:00.73	
10	2	7	Armin Porobic (56.46); Sofie Reisænen (1:13.31); Elise Olsen (59.67); Henrik Christiansen (51.81)	Norway	4:01.25	
11	1	6	Patrick Conaton (57.11); Meghan Small (1:12.27); Justin Wright (55.40); Clara Smiddy (56.49)	United States	4:01.27	
12	2	2	Laurent Bams (56.81); Kim Busch (1:13.67); Mathys Goosen (54.44); Esmee Bos (57.24)	Netherlands	4:02.16	
13	2	1	Song Suk-gyu (59.02); Yang Ji-won (1:10.87); Park Jin-young (59.90); Kim Jae-youn (53.20)	South Korea	4:02.99	
14	1	3	Petter Fredriksson (57.79); Sophie Hansson (1:11.07); Jaqueline Hippi (1:03.07); Isak Eliasson (51.16)	Sweden	4:03.09	
15	3	7	Bobbi Gichard (1:03.33); Jacob Garrod (1:04.09); Michael Mincham (57.70); Gabrielle Fa'amausili (58.40)	New Zealand	4:03.52	
16	3	5	Danielle Hanus (1:03.52); Kelsey Wog (1:13.56); Colin Gilbert (57.50); Javier Acevedo (50.48)	Canada	4:05.06	
17	2	8	Žan Pogačar (57.22); Tjaša Pintar (1:14.31); Nastja Govejšek (1:01.30); Grega Popović (53.49)	Slovenia	4:06.32	
18	2	6	Lau Shiu Yue (59.78); Sutton Choi (1:08.27); Siobhán Haughey (1:02.62); Jamie Yeung (59.36)	Hong Kong	4:10.03	
	2	3	Pauline Mahieu (1:05.68); Jean Dencausse (1:04.06); Camille Wishaupt; Guillaume Laure	France	DSQ	
	3	3	Carita Luukkanen (1:06.74); Jakob Nordman; Adam Vik; Silja Känsäkoski	Finland	DSQ	

=== Final ===
The final was held at 19:29.

Rank	Lane	Name	Nationality	Time	Notes
1st place, gold medalist(s)	4	Li Guangyuan (54.81); He Yun (1:07.54); Zhang Yufei (58.28); Yu Hexin (48.70)	China	3:49.33	
2nd place, silver medalist(s)	5	Irina Prikhodko (1:02.39); Anton Chupkov (1:00.86); Aleksandr Sadovnikov (52.69); Daria S. Ustinova (54.92)	Russia	3:50.86	
3rd place, bronze medalist(s)	3	Amy Forrester (1:02.11); Grayson Bell (1:02.52); Nicholas Brown (53.32); Ami Matsuo (54.50)	Australia	3:52.45	
4	1	Natalia de Luccas (1:02.20); Andreas Mickosz (1:02.57); Giovanna Diamante (1:00.92); Matheus Santana (48.24)	Brazil	3:53.93	
5	6	Nathania van Niekerk (1:03.18); Jarred Crous (1:01.13); Joshua Steyn (53.87); Marlies Ross (56.68)	South Africa	3:54.86	AF
6	2	Luke Greenbank (56.78); Georgina Evans (1:10.57); Charlotte Atkinson (1:01.34); Duncan Scott (49.63)	Great Britain	3:58.32	
7	8	Tereza Grusová (1:02.34); Vojtěch Simbartl (1:05.35); Lucie Svěcená (59.82); Petr Novak (52.12)	Czech Republic	3:59.63	
8	7	Laura Yus (1:03.51); Gonzalo Carazo (1:04.20); Juan Marín (55.90); África Zamorano (56.10)	Spain	3:59.71	
