= Swimming at the 2014 Summer Youth Olympics – Girls' 4 × 100 metre medley relay =

Girls' 4 × 100 metre medley relay at the 2014 Summer Youth Olympics
- Venue: Nanjing Olympic Sports Centre
- Dates: 18 August
- Competitors: 40 from 10 nations
- Winning time: 4:03.58

Medalists
gold medal	Qiu Yuhan; He Yun; Zhang Yufei; Shen Duo	China
silver medal	Jessica Fullalove; Georgina Evans; Charlotte Atkinson; Amelia Maughan	Great Britain
bronze medal	Amy Forrester; Ella Bond; Brianna Throssel; Ami Matsuo	Australia

The girls' 4 × 100 metre medley relay event in swimming at the 2014 Summer Youth Olympics took place on 18 August at the Nanjing Olympic Sports Centre in Nanjing, China.

== Results ==
=== Heats ===
The heats were held at 11:03.

Rank	Heat	Lane	Name	Nationality	Time	Notes
1	1	5	Jessica Fullalove (1:02.52); Georgina Evans (1:08.89); Charlotte Atkinson (1:01.77); Amelia Maughan (56.65)	Great Britain	4:09.83	Q
2	2	6	Qiu Yuhan (1:02.93); He Yun (1:08.10); Zhang Yufei (1:00.02); Shen Duo (59.10)	China	4:10.15	Q
3	2	4	Amy Forrester (1:02.90); Ella Bond (1:12.07); Brianna Throssell (1:01.43); Ami Matsuo (54.82)	Australia	4:11.22	Q
4	1	4	Danielle Hanus (1:02.28); Kelsey Wog (1:10.72); Danika Huizinga (1:00.94); Mackenzie Glover (57.85)	Canada	4:11.79	Q
5	2	5	Mandy Feldbinder (1:03.39); Julia Willers (1:08.60); Kathrin Demler (1:01.94); Patricia Wartenberg (58.57)	Germany	4:12.50	Q
6	2	2	Nathania van Niekerk (1:03.28); Justine MacFarlane (1:10.86); Marlies Ross (1:02.04); Michelle Weber (58.95)	South Africa	4:15.13	Q
7	1	6	Irina Prikhodko (1:02.34); Daria Mullakaeva (1:17.34); Rozaliya Nasretdinova (1:00.50); Daria S. Ustinova (56.24)	Russia	4:16.42	Q
8	2	3	Miono Takeuchi (1:04.50); Suzuna Onodera (1:12.22); Jurina Shiga (1:01.13); Rina Yoshimura (59.26)	Japan	4:17.11	Q
9	2	7	Hannah Moore (1:03.32); Meghan Small (1:13.27); Courtney Mykkanen (1:04.35); Clara Smiddy (56.26)	United States	4:17.20	
10	1	2	Laura Yus (1:03.47); África Zamorano (1:13.07); Jimena Pérez (1:03.03); Sandra Pallarés (57.91)	Spain	4:17.48	
	1	3		Netherlands	DNS	

=== Final ===
The final was held at 19:29.

Rank	Lane	Name	Nationality	Time	Notes
1st place, gold medalist(s)	5	Qiu Yuhan (1:02.26); He Yun (1:08.73); Zhang Yufei (58.56); Shen Duo (54.03)	China	4:03.58	WJR
2nd place, silver medalist(s)	4	Jessica Fullalove (1:01.74); Georgina Evans (1:08.96); Charlotte Atkinson (1:00.13); Amelia Maughan (54.92)	Great Britain	4:05.75	
3rd place, bronze medalist(s)	3	Amy Forrester (1:02.83); Ella Bond (1:10.16); Brianna Throssell (59.22); Ami Matsuo (54.17)	Australia	4:06.38	
4	2	Mandy Feldbinder (1:02.89); Julia Willers (1:09.09); Kathrin Demler (1:00.98); Patricia Wartenberg (57.58)	Germany	4:10.54	
5	6	Danielle Hanus (1:02.73); Kelsey Wog (1:10.16); Danika Huizinga (1:00.05); Mackenzie Glover (57.79)	Canada	4:10.73	
6	1	Irina Prikhodko (1:02.18); Daria S. Ustinova (1:15.31); Rozaliya Nasretdinova (1:00.33); Daria Mullakaeva (55.95)	Russia	4:13.77	
7	7	Nathania van Niekerk (1:03.62); Justine MacFarlane (1:11.33); Marlies Ross (1:01.17); Michelle Weber (59.32)	South Africa	4:15.44	
8	8	Miono Takeuchi (1:04.37); Suzuna Onodera (1:12.28); Jurina Shiga (1:01.17); Rina Yoshimura (58.89)	Japan	4:16.71	
