= Swimming at the 2014 Summer Youth Olympics – Girls' 100 metre freestyle =

Girls' 100 metre freestyle at the 2014 Summer Youth Olympics
- Venue: Nanjing Olympic Sports Centre
- Dates: 18 August (heats, semifinals); 19 August (final)
- Competitors: 34 from 30 nations
- Winning time: 53.84

Medalists
gold medal	Shen Duo	China
silver medal	Siobhán Haughey	Hong Kong
bronze medal	Qiu Yuhan	China

The girls' 100 metre freestyle event in swimming at the 2014 Summer Youth Olympics took place on 18–19 August at the Nanjing Olympic Sports Centre in Nanjing, China.

== Results ==
=== Heats ===
The heats were held at 10:11.

Rank	Heat	Lane	Name	Nationality	Time	Notes
1	4	4	Shen Duo	China	54.44	Q
2	4	5	Qiu Yuhan	China	54.65	Q
3	3	4	Ami Matsuo	Australia	55.32	Q
4	3	3	Rachele Ceracchi	Italy	55.81	Q
5	5	4	Siobhán Haughey	Hong Kong	55.89	Q
6	4	6	Daria S. Ustinova	Russia	55.99	Q
7	5	6	Daria Mullakaeva	Russia	56.06	Q
8	5	3	Nastja Govejšek	Slovenia	56.09	Q
9	5	5	Rūta Meilutytė	Lithuania	56.20	Q
10	5	2	Lena Kreundl	Austria	56.32	Q
11	3	6	Tjaša Pintar	Slovenia	56.39	Q
12	2	4	Elise Olsen	Norway	57.05	Q
13	4	3	Julie Meynen	Luxembourg	57.06	Q
14	3	5	Amelia Maughan	Great Britain	57.08	Q
15	3	8	Elisbet Matos	Cuba	57.25	Q
16	3	2	İlknur Çakıcı	Turkey	57.30	QSO
16	5	1	Marlies Ross	South Africa	57.30	QSO
18	4	2	Clara Smiddy	United States	57.38	
19	5	7	Marina Chan	Singapore	57.44	
20	2	5	Nikola Petryka	Poland	57.67	
20	5	8	Jaqueline Hippi	Sweden	57.67	
22	3	7	Mandy Feldbinder	Germany	57.69	
23	4	1	Zohar Shikler	Israel	58.09	
24	4	7	Sandra Pallarés	Spain	58.20	
25	3	1	Patricia Wartenberg	Germany	58.27	
26	2	7	Gabrielle Fa'amausili	New Zealand	58.38	
27	4	8	Elisavet Panti	Greece	58.47	
28	2	8	Machiko Raheem	Sri Lanka	58.50	
29	2	6	Branka Vranjes	Bosnia and Herzegovina	58.64	
30	2	1	Kataria Shivani	India	58.87	
31	2	3	Julimar Ávila	Honduras	58.94	
32	1	4	Margarita Pissaridou	Cyprus	1:00.37	
33	1	5	Britany van Lange	Guyana	1:01.41	
34	1	3	Thalia Bergasse	Saint Lucia	1:04.34	
	1	6	Sabrina Kassam	Tanzania	DNS	
	2	2	Danielle Hanus	Canada	DNS	

==== Swim-off ====
The swim-off was held at 11:45.

Rank	Lane	Name	Nationality	Time	Notes
1	4	İlknur Çakıcı	Turkey	57.23	Q
2	5	Marlies Ross	South Africa	57.45	

=== Semifinals ===
The semifinals were held at 18:40.

Rank	Heat	Lane	Name	Nationality	Time	Notes
1	1	4	Qiu Yuhan	China	54.78	Q
2	2	5	Ami Matsuo	Australia	54.98	Q
3	2	1	Julie Meynen	Luxembourg	55.33	Q
4	2	2	Rūta Meilutytė	Lithuania	55.46	Q
5	2	6	Daria Mullakaeva	Russia	55.53	Q
6	1	3	Daria S. Ustinova	Russia	55.54	Q
7	2	3	Siobhán Haughey	Hong Kong	55.56	Q
8	2	4	Shen Duo	China	55.62	Q
9	1	6	Nastja Govejšek	Slovenia	55.82	
10	1	1	Amelia Maughan	Great Britain	55.97	
11	1	2	Lena Kreundl	Austria	56.16	
12	1	5	Rachele Ceracchi	Italy	56.22	
13	2	7	Tjaša Pintar	Slovenia	56.42	
14	1	7	Elise Olsen	Norway	56.60	
15	2	8	Elisbet Matos	Cuba	57.11	
16	1	8	İlknur Çakıcı	Turkey	57.39	

=== Final ===
The final was held at 19:15.

Rank	Lane	Name	Nationality	Time	Notes
1st place, gold medalist(s)	8	Shen Duo	China	53.84	WJR
2nd place, silver medalist(s)	1	Siobhán Haughey	Hong Kong	54.61	
3rd place, bronze medalist(s)	4	Qiu Yuhan	China	54.66	
4	5	Ami Matsuo	Australia	54.75	
5	6	Rūta Meilutytė	Lithuania	55.17	
6	3	Julie Meynen	Luxembourg	55.29	
7	2	Daria Mullakaeva	Russia	55.69	
8	7	Daria S. Ustinova	Russia	55.88	
