= Swimming at the 2014 Summer Youth Olympics – Mixed 4 × 100 metre freestyle relay =

Mixed 4 × 100 metre freestyle relay at the 2014 Summer Youth Olympics
- Venue: Nanjing Olympic Sports Centre
- Dates: 17 August
- Nations: 18
- Winning time: 3:27.02

Medalists
| gold medal | Li Guangyuan; Qiu Yuhan; Yu Hexin; Shen Duo; Li Zhuhao; Zhang Yufei | China |
| silver medal | Luiz Altamir Melo; Natalia de Luccas; Matheus Santana; Giovanna Diamante | Brazil |
| bronze medal | Kyle Chalmers; Ami Matsuo; Brianna Throssell; Nicholas Brown; Nic Groenewald | Australia |

The mixed 4 × 100 metre freestyle relay event in swimming at the 2014 Summer Youth Olympics took place on 17 August at the Nanjing Olympic Sports Centre in Nanjing, China.

== Results ==
=== Heats ===
The heats were held at 11:22.

| Rank | Heat | Lane | Name | Nationality | Time | Notes |
|---|---|---|---|---|---|---|
| 1 | 3 | 3 | Li Zhuhao (52.29); Qiu Yuhan (53.71); Yu Hexin (48.96); Zhang Yufei (54.40) | China | 3:29.36 | Q |
| 2 | 3 | 5 | Matheus Santana (49.55); Luiz Altamir Melo (50.66); Natalia de Luccas (57.07); Giovanna Diamante (55.86) | Brazil | 3:33.14 | Q |
| 3 | 2 | 7 | Kyle Stolk (50.30); Kim Busch (57.70); Robin Neumann (56.01); Laurent Bams (50.42) | Netherlands | 3:34.43 | Q |
| 4 | 2 | 8 | Filipp Shopin (51.15); Aleksandr Sadovnikov (51.69); Rozaliya Nasretdinova (56.49); Daria S. Ustinova (56.07) | Russia | 3:35.40 | Q |
| 5 | 2 | 6 | Duncan Scott (50.39); Martyn Walton (51.19); Amelia Maughan (55.98); Charlotte Atkinson (57.85) | Great Britain | 3:35.41 | Q |
| 6 | 3 | 4 | Nic Groenewald (53.68); Ami Matsuo (54.18); Brianna Throssell (56.19); Nicholas Brown (52.46) | Australia | 3:36.51 | Q |
| 7 | 3 | 2 | Damian Wierling (50.64); Mandy Feldbinder (57.56); Patricia Wartenberg (58.05); Alexander Kunert (50.93) | Germany | 3:37.18 | Q |
| 8 | 2 | 3 | Juan Marín (52.09); Sandra Pallarés (57.43); Gonzalo Carazo (51.92); África Zamorano (56.69) | Spain | 3:38.13 | Q |
| 9 | 1 | 5 | Žan Pogačar (52.95); Grega Popović (53.22); Nastja Govejšek (55.54); Tjaša Pintar (56.46) | Slovenia | 3:38.17 | |
| 10 | 2 | 5 | Javier Acevedo (50.35); Matthew Mac (52.81); Danielle Hanus (58.10); Danika Huizinga (57.56) | Canada | 3:38.82 | |
| 11 | 1 | 3 | Patrick Conaton (52.05); Clara Smiddy (56.59); Meghan Small (59.47); Patrick Mulcare (51.38) | United States | 3:39.49 | |
| 12 | 3 | 8 | Marlies Ross (57.90); Chris Reid (51.64); Brent Szurdoki (52.62); Nathania van Niekerk (58.65) | South Africa | 3:40.81 | |
| 13 | 3 | 1 | Henrik Christiansen (52.86); Armin Porobic (52.46); Elise Olsen (56.54); Sofie Reisænen (59.86) | Norway | 3:41.72 | |
| 14 | 3 | 6 | Guillaume Laure (51.77); Emma Terebo (58.98); Pauline Mahieu (59.10); Jean Dencausse (52.32) | France | 3:42.17 | |
| 15 | 2 | 2 | Ippei Watanabe (52.17); Koki Tsunefuka (53.30); Jurina Shiga (58.01); Rina Yoshimura (59.26) | Japan | 3:42.74 | |
| 16 | 1 | 4 | Dylan Koo (54.73); Marína Chan (57.86); Samantha Yeo (1:00.68); Darren Lim (51.01) | Singapore | 3:44.28 | |
| 17 | 3 | 7 | Song Suk-gyu (56.28); Park Jin-young (58.77); Yang Ji-won (1:02.36); Kim Jae-youn (54.40) | South Korea | 3:51.81 | |
| 18 | 2 | 1 | Michael Mincham (52.79); Jacob Garrod (57.05); Bobbi Gichard (1:03.04); Gabrielle Fa'amausili (1:01.50) | New Zealand | 3:54.38 | |
| | 2 | 4 | | Belgium | DNS | |

=== Final ===
The final was held at 18:51.

| Rank | Lane | Name | Nationality | Time | Notes |
|---|---|---|---|---|---|
| 1st place, gold medalist(s) | 4 | Li Guangyuan (50.94); Qiu Yuhan (54.04); Yu Hexin (48.61); Shen Duo (53.43) | China | 3:27.02 | WJR |
| 2nd place, silver medalist(s) | 5 | Luiz Altamir Melo (50.90); Natalia de Luccas (57.07); Matheus Santana (47.73); Giovanna Diamante (55.85) | Brazil | 3:31.55 | |
| 3rd place, bronze medalist(s) | 7 | Kyle Chalmers (50.35); Ami Matsuo (54.35); Brianna Throssell (55.60); Nicholas Brown (51.46) | Australia | 3:31.76 | |
| 4 | 6 | Filipp Shopin (50.32); Evgeny Rylov (50.66); Rozaliya Nasretdinova (55.89); Daria S. Ustinova (55.28) | Russia | 3:32.15 | |
| 5 | 3 | Kyle Stolk (50.10); Esmee Bos (57.01); Robin Neumann (55.84); Laurent Bams (50.24) | Netherlands | 3:33.19 | |
| 6 | 2 | Duncan Scott (50.16); Martyn Walton (50.78); Amelia Maughan (55.50); Charlotte Atkinson (56.84) | Great Britain | 3:33.28 | |
| 7 | 1 | Damian Wierling (50.01); Mandy Feldbinder (57.29); Patricia Wartenberg (57.54); Alexander Kunert (51.67) | Germany | 3:36.51 | |
| 8 | 8 | Juan Marín (51.53); Sandra Pallarés (57.77); Gonzalo Carazo (51.54); África Zamorano (57.26) | Spain | 3:38.10 | |
