= Swimming at the 2014 Summer Youth Olympics – Girls' 4 × 100 metre freestyle relay =

Girls' 4 × 100 metre freestyle relay at the 2014 Summer Youth Olympics
- Venue: Nanjing Olympic Sports Centre
- Dates: 21 August
- Competitors: 40 from 10 nations
- Winning time: 3:41.19

Medalists
| gold medal | Qiu Yuhan; He Yun; Zhang Yufei; Shen Duo | China |
| silver medal | Rozaliya Nasretdinova; Daria S. Ustinova; Irina Prikhodko; Daria Mullakaeva | Russia |
| bronze medal | Brianna Throssel; Ella Bond; Amy Forrester; Ami Matsuo | Australia |

The girls' 4 × 100 metre freestyle relay event in swimming at the 2014 Summer Youth Olympics took place on 21 August at the Nanjing Olympic Sports Centre in Nanjing, China.

== Results ==
=== Heats ===
The heats were held at 10:42.

| Rank | Heat | Lane | Name | Nationality | Time | Notes |
|---|---|---|---|---|---|---|
| 1 | 2 | 2 | Daria Mullakaeva (56.59); Daria S. Ustinova (55.92); Irina Prikhodko (57.57); Rozaliya Nasretdinova (56.88) | Russia | 3:46.96 | Q |
| 2 | 2 | 4 | Brianna Throssell (57.60); Ella Bond (58.35); Amy Forrester (57.27); Ami Matsuo (55.50) | Australia | 3:48.72 | Q |
| 3 | 1 | 5 | Shen Duo (55.22); He Yun (59.76); Zhang Yufei (57.52); Qiu Yuhan (57.00) | China | 3:49.50 | Q |
| 4 | 2 | 6 | Kim Busch (58.08); Esmee Bos (57.24); Robin Neumann (56.70); Maaike de Waard (57.96) | Netherlands | 3:49.98 | Q |
| 5 | 1 | 4 | Natalia de Luccas (57.00); Bruna Primati (58.52); Viviane Jungblut (57.97); Giovanna Diamante (57.91) | Brazil | 3:51.40 | Q |
| 6 | 2 | 5 | Danielle Hanus (58.41); Danika Huizinga (57.50); Kelsey Wog (58.61); Mackenzie Glover (58.56) | Canada | 3:53.08 | Q |
| 7 | 2 | 3 | Patricia Wartenberg (57.94); Julia Willers (1:00.62); Kathrin Demler (57.47); Mandy Feldbinder (57.19) | Germany | 3:53.22 | Q |
| 8 | 1 | 2 | Clara Smiddy (57.52); Hannah Moore (58.54); Courtney Mykkanen (59.80); Meghan Small (57.57) | United States | 3:53.43 | Q |
| 9 | 1 | 3 | Jurina Shiga (58.06); Rina Yoshimura (58.62); Suzuna Onodera (59.50); Miono Takeuchi (1:00.55) | Japan | 3:56.73 | |
| 10 | 1 | 6 | Marlies Ross (58.30); Nathania van Niekerk (59.53); Michelle Weber (59.74); Justine MacFarlane (1:01.48) | South Africa | 3:59.05 | |

=== Final ===
The final was held at 19:05.

| Rank | Lane | Name | Nationality | Time | Notes |
|---|---|---|---|---|---|
| 1st place, gold medalist(s) | 3 | Qiu Yuhan (54.93); He Yun (58.58); Zhang Yufei (54.09); Shen Duo (53.59) | China | 3:41.19 | |
| 2nd place, silver medalist(s) | 4 | Rozaliya Nasretdinova (55.65); Daria S. Ustinova (54.85); Irina Prikhodko (56.52); Daria Mullakaeva (55.37) | Russia | 3:42.39 | |
| 3rd place, bronze medalist(s) | 5 | Brianna Throssell (55.78); Ella Bond (57.31); Amy Forrester (57.42); Ami Matsuo (53.93) | Australia | 3:44.44 | |
| 4 | 6 | Kim Busch (57.48); Esmee Bos (56.34); Maaike de Waard (56.37); Robin Neumann (55.73) | Netherlands | 3:45.92 | |
| 5 | 2 | Natalia de Luccas (56.61); Bruna Primati (56.99); Viviane Jungblut (56.87); Giovanna Diamante (55.87) | Brazil | 3:46.34 | |
| 6 | 1 | Patricia Wartenberg (57.49); Julia Willers (1:00.06); Kathrin Demler (57.05); Mandy Feldbinder (56.52) | Germany | 3:51.12 | |
| 7 | 8 | Clara Smiddy (56.76); Hannah Moore (58.11); Courtney Mykkanen (59.18); Meghan Small (57.32) | United States | 3:51.37 | |
| 8 | 7 | Mackenzie Glover (58.38); Danielle Hanus (58.28); Kelsey Wog (59.48); Danika Huizinga (57.89) | Canada | 3:54.03 | |
