= Canada at the 2014 Summer Youth Olympics =

- IOC code: CAN
- NOC: Canadian Olympic Committee
- Website: www.olympic.ca (in English and French)

in Nanjing
- Competitors: 75 in 19 sports
- Flag bearer: Dylan French
- Medals Ranked 55th: Gold 0 Silver 4 Bronze 3 Total 7

Summer Youth Olympics appearances
- 2010; 2014; 2018; 2026

Canada competed at the 2014 Summer Youth Olympics, in Nanjing, China from 16 August to 28 August 2014. Field hockey Olympian Sandra Levy was chosen to be the nation's chef de mission. The Canadian team consists of 75 athletes in 19 sports.

== Medalists ==
Medals awarded to participants of mixed-NOC (Combined) teams are represented in italics. These medals are not counted towards the individual NOC medal tally.

Medal	Name	Sport	Event	Date
Silver	Canada girls' national rugby sevens team: Moanda Anglo; Catherine Boudreault; Pamphinette Buisa; Hannah Darling; Chanelle Edwards-Challenger; Ashley Gordon; Lauren Kerr; Jenna Morrison; Kaitlyn Richard; Cass Schmidt; Maddy Seatle; Charity Williams	Rugby Sevens	Girls' Tournament	20 August
Silver	Megan McNamara; Nicole McNamara	Beach Volleyball	Girls' Tournament	26 August
Silver	Philippe Gagné	Diving	Boys' 10 m platform	26 August
Silver	Canada boys' national field hockey team: Parmeet Gill; Liam Manning; Floyd Mascarenhas; Braedon Muldoon; Balraj Panesar; Brandon Pereira; Vikramjeet Sandhu; Amrit Sidhu; Harbir Sidhu	Field Hockey	Boys' Tournament	27 August
Bronze	Dan de Groot	Rowing	Boys' Single Sculls	20 August
Bronze	Caileigh Filmer; Larissa Werbicki	Rowing	Girls' Pairs	20 August
Bronze	Eric Peters	Archery	Mixed Team	24 August
Bronze	Philippe Gagné	Diving	Boys' 3 m springboard	24 August

== Archery ==
Canada qualified a male archer from its performance at the American Continental Qualification Tournament.

Individual

Athlete	Event	Ranking round		Round of 32	Round of 16	Quarterfinals	Semifinals	Final / BM	Rank
Athlete	Event	Score	Seed	Opposition Score	Opposition Score	Opposition Score	Opposition Score	Opposition Score	Rank
Eric Peters	Boys' Individual	653	18	Szafran (POL); L 2–6	did not advance				17

Team

Athletes	Event	Ranking round		Round of 32	Round of 16	Quarterfinals	Semifinals	Final / BM	Rank
Athletes	Event	Score	Seed	Opposition Score	Opposition Score	Opposition Score	Opposition Score	Opposition Score	Rank
(Canada) Eric Peters (Finland) Mirjam Tuokkola	Mixed Team	1286	12	(Slovenia) Strajhar (France) Gaubil; W 5–4	(Italy) Fregnan (Australia) Sutton; W 6–0	(Brazil) D'Almeida (Kazakhstan) Abdrazak; W 6–2	(Philippines) Moreno (China) Li; L 1–5	(Belgium) Martens (Guatemala) Romero; W 6–2	(bronze)

== Athletics ==
Canada qualified 10 athletes.

Qualification Legend: Q=Final A (medal); qB=Final B (non-medal); qC=Final C (non-medal); qD=Final D (non-medal); qE=Final E (non-medal)

Boys
Track & road events

Athlete	Event	Heats		Final	
Athlete	Event	Result	Rank	Result	Rank
Shermar Paul	200 m	21.80	12 qB	21.93	10
Braydon Rennie	1500 m	3:53.02	12 qB	3:53.64	11
Jay Ort	3000 m	8:23.76 PB	9 qB	8:31.05	8

Field Events

Athlete	Event	Qualification		Final	
Athlete	Event	Distance	Rank	Distance	Rank
Tristan Slater	Pole vault	4.80	T-5 Q	4.85	T-4

Girls
Track & road events

Athlete	Event	Heats		Final	
Athlete	Event	Result	Rank	Result	Rank
Tegan Wilson	200 m	25.12	5 qB	25.18	4
Kyra Constantine	400 m	54.24	1 Q	53.70	5
Emanuelle Masse	100 m hurdles	14.49	6 qC	14.36	2
Lexi Aitken	400 m hurdles	1:00.24	3 Q	1:00.27	6

Field events

Athlete	Event	Qualification		Final	
Athlete	Event	Distance	Position	Distance	Position
Magali Roche	Long jump	5.70	7 Q	5.90	6
Brittni Wolczyk	Javelin throw	46.43	13 qB	48.85	2

Mixed events

Athletes	Event	Heats		Final	
Athletes	Event	Result	Rank	Result	Rank
Team 007; Tristan Slater; Canada; Fabienne Schönig; Germany; Benediktas Mickus; Lithuania; Mirna Marques da Silva; Brazil; Yuliya Levchenko; Ukraine; Bence Halász; Hungary; Hanin Thabit; Yemen; Jaheel Hyde; Jamaica	8×100 m relay mixed teams	1:44.10	9 Q	1:44.77	4
Team 050; Dzhois Koba; Ukraine; Esraa Happa; Egypt; Mareen Kalis; Germany; Adam Mohamed; Sudan; Magali Roche; Canada; Nanthavath Khentanone; Laos; Gemechu Lama; Ethiopia; Jason Yaw; Guyana	8×100 m relay mixed teams	1:43.45	5 Q	1:52.88	7
Team 046; Juan José Garrancho; Spain; Djafar Swedi; Democratic Republic of the Congo; Brittni Wolczyk; Canada; Wen Wan-Ju; Chinese Taipei; Soukaina Belil; Morocco; Tjaša Stanko; Slovenia; Clemens Prüfer; Germany; Jeffrey Uzzell; United States	8×100 m relay mixed teams	1:43.29	4 Q	1:54.59	9

== Beach Volleyball ==
Canada qualified a boys' team by winning the NORCECA Central Zone Qualifier and qualified a girls' team by their performance at the NORCECA Final YOG Qualifier.

Athletes	Event	Preliminary round	Standing	Round of 24	Round of 16	Quarterfinals	Semifinals	Final / BM	Rank
Athletes	Event	Opposition Score	Standing	Opposition Score	Opposition Score	Opposition Score	Opposition Score	Opposition Score	Rank
Jake MacNeil; Andrew Richards	Boys'	Pool D Aveiro – Aulisi (ARG) L 1-2 (13-21, 21-19, 12-15)	3 Q	Philip – Tetteh (GHA) W 2-0 (21-14, 21-14)	Art – Oleg (RUS) L 1-2 (15-21, 16-21)	did not advance			17
Jake MacNeil; Andrew Richards	Boys'	J.surin – Nakprakhong (THA) W 2-0 (21-18, 22-20)	3 Q	Philip – Tetteh (GHA) W 2-0 (21-14, 21-14)	Art – Oleg (RUS) L 1-2 (15-21, 16-21)	did not advance			17
Jake MacNeil; Andrew Richards	Boys'	Alex – Aloisio (STP) W 1-2 (13-21, 21-19, 12-15)	3 Q	Philip – Tetteh (GHA) W 2-0 (21-14, 21-14)	Art – Oleg (RUS) L 1-2 (15-21, 16-21)	did not advance			17
Jake MacNeil; Andrew Richards	Boys'	Patrick – Abubakarr (SLE) W 2-0 (0-0, 0-0)	3 Q	Philip – Tetteh (GHA) W 2-0 (21-14, 21-14)	Art – Oleg (RUS) L 1-2 (15-21, 16-21)	did not advance			17
Jake MacNeil; Andrew Richards	Boys'	Oleh – Kovalov (UKR) L 0-2 (18-21, 15-21)	3 Q	Philip – Tetteh (GHA) W 2-0 (21-14, 21-14)	Art – Oleg (RUS) L 1-2 (15-21, 16-21)	did not advance			17
Megan McNamara; Nicole McNamara	Girls'	Pool A Ocampo – Pacheco (ECU) W	1 Q	Bye	Kawfong – Tangkaeo (THA) W 2 - 0 (21-17, 21-12)	Caputo – Muno (USA) W 2 - 1 (14-21, 21-18, 15-8)	Arnholdt – Sarah Schneider (GER) W 2 - 0 (21-18, 21-18)	Silva – Santos (BRA) L 1 - 2 (21-17, 13-21, 14-16)	2nd place, silver medalist(s)
Megan McNamara; Nicole McNamara	Girls'	Palmhert – Seebach (NAM) W	1 Q	Bye	Kawfong – Tangkaeo (THA) W 2 - 0 (21-17, 21-12)	Caputo – Muno (USA) W 2 - 1 (14-21, 21-18, 15-8)	Arnholdt – Sarah Schneider (GER) W 2 - 0 (21-18, 21-18)	Silva – Santos (BRA) L 1 - 2 (21-17, 13-21, 14-16)	2nd place, silver medalist(s)
Megan McNamara; Nicole McNamara	Girls'	Graudina – Kravcenoka (LAT) W 2-1 (21-19, 14-21, 15-9)	1 Q	Bye	Kawfong – Tangkaeo (THA) W 2 - 0 (21-17, 21-12)	Caputo – Muno (USA) W 2 - 1 (14-21, 21-18, 15-8)	Arnholdt – Sarah Schneider (GER) W 2 - 0 (21-18, 21-18)	Silva – Santos (BRA) L 1 - 2 (21-17, 13-21, 14-16)	2nd place, silver medalist(s)
Megan McNamara; Nicole McNamara	Girls'	Lassyuta – Pimenova (KAZ) W	1 Q	Bye	Kawfong – Tangkaeo (THA) W 2 - 0 (21-17, 21-12)	Caputo – Muno (USA) W 2 - 1 (14-21, 21-18, 15-8)	Arnholdt – Sarah Schneider (GER) W 2 - 0 (21-18, 21-18)	Silva – Santos (BRA) L 1 - 2 (21-17, 13-21, 14-16)	2nd place, silver medalist(s)
Megan McNamara; Nicole McNamara	Girls'	Enzo – Lantignotti (ITA) W	1 Q	Bye	Kawfong – Tangkaeo (THA) W 2 - 0 (21-17, 21-12)	Caputo – Muno (USA) W 2 - 1 (14-21, 21-18, 15-8)	Arnholdt – Sarah Schneider (GER) W 2 - 0 (21-18, 21-18)	Silva – Santos (BRA) L 1 - 2 (21-17, 13-21, 14-16)	2nd place, silver medalist(s)

== Canoeing ==
Canada qualified two boats based on its performance at the 2013 World Junior Canoe Sprint and Slalom Championships.

Boys

Athlete	Event	Qualification		Repechage		Round of 16		Quarterfinals	Semifinals	Final / BM	Rank
Athlete	Event	Time	Rank	Time	Rank	Time	Rank	Opposition Result	Opposition Result	Opposition Result	Rank
Alex Brent	K1 slalom	1:28.710	11 Q	—N/a		1:28.788	13	did not advance			
Alex Brent	K1 sprint	1:38.843	8 Q	—N/a		1:37.485	7 Q	Oleynikov (RUS); L 1:36.061	did not advance		5

Girls

Athlete	Event	Qualification		Repechage		Round of 16		Quarterfinals	Semifinals	Final / BM	Rank
Athlete	Event	Time	Rank	Time	Rank	Time	Rank	Opposition Result	Opposition Result	Opposition Result	Rank
Anne-So Lavoie-Parent	C1 slalom	1:57.212	6 Q	—N/a				Ohmayer (GER); L DNF	did not advance		
Anne-So Lavoie-Parent	C1 sprint	2:26.050	3 Q	—N/a				Ortega (ECU); W 2:22.514	Bobr (BLR); L 2:35.729	Morales (MEX); L 2:36.190	4

== Diving ==
Canada qualified four quotas based on its performance at the Nanjing 2014 Diving Qualifying Event.

Athlete	Event	Preliminary		Final	
Athlete	Event	Points	Rank	Points	Rank
Philippe Gagné	Boys' 3 m springboard	515.50	5	566.75	3rd place, bronze medalist(s)
Philippe Gagné	Boys' 10 m platform	458.00	6	531.70	2nd place, silver medalist(s)
Molly Carlson	Girls' 3 m springboard	356.20	11	388.00	8
Molly Carlson	Girls' 10 m platform	308.30	9	296.00	11
Josefin Schneider (GER); Philippe Gagné (CAN)	Mixed team	—N/a		326.05	5
Molly Carlson (CAN); Kevin Garcia Alvarez (COL)	Mixed team	—N/a		323.25	6

== Fencing ==
Canada qualified two athletes based on its performance at the 2014 FIE Cadet World Championships.

Boys

Athlete	Event	Pool Round	Seed	Round of 16	Quarterfinals	Semifinals	Final / BM	Rank
Athlete	Event	Opposition Score	Seed	Opposition Score	Opposition Score	Opposition Score	Opposition Score	Rank
Dylan French	Épée	Pool 2 Yoo (USA); L 4-5; Ogilvie (NZL) Kim (KOR) Elsayed (EGY) Abate (ITA)	6	Ogilvie (NZL); W 15-14	Limarev (RUS); L 5-15	did not advance		8

Girls

Athlete	Event	Pool Round	Seed	Round of 16	Quarterfinals	Semifinals	Final / BM	Rank
Athlete	Event	Opposition Score	Seed	Opposition Score	Opposition Score	Opposition Score	Opposition Score	Rank
Jenny Zhao	Foil	Szymczak (POL) Elsharkawy (EGY) Martyanova (RUS) Choi (HKG) Borella (ITA) Kontochristopoulou (GRE)						

Mixed Team

Athletes	Event	Round of 16	Quarterfinals	Semifinals / PM	Final / PM	Rank
Athletes	Event	Opposition Score	Opposition Score	Opposition Score	Opposition Score	Rank
Americas 2 Dylan French (CAN); Gabriela Cecchini (BRA); Karol Metryka (USA); Tia Simms-Lymn (JAM); Pedro Marostega (BRA); Aydill-Marie Colon Quinones (PUR)	Mixed Team	Africa; W 30–20	Europe 1 L 29–30	Europe 3 W 30–29	Europe 4 W 30–28	5
	Mixed Team					

== Field hockey ==
Canada qualified a boys' team based on its performance at the 2014 Youth American Championship.

=== Boys' tournament ===
Roster

- Parmeet Gill
- Liam Manning
- Floyd Mascarenhas
- Braedon Muldoon
- Balraj Panesar
- Brandon Pereira
- Vikramjeet Sandhu
- Amrit Sidhu
- Harbir Sidhu

Group Stage

Pos	Team	Pld	W	D	L	GF	GA	GD	Pts	Qualification
1	Spain	4	4	0	0	28	10	+18	12	Quarterfinals
2	Australia	4	2	0	2	21	17	+4	6	Quarterfinals
3	Canada	4	2	0	2	14	13	+1	6	Quarterfinals
4	South Africa	4	2	0	2	11	19	−8	6	Quarterfinals
5	Bangladesh	4	0	0	4	7	22	−15	0	

Source: FIH
Rules for classification: 1) points; 2) goal difference; 3) goals scored; 4) head-to-head result.

17 August 2014
19:00

South Africa	1-5	Canada
Ntuli 3'	Report	Panesar 7', 10'; Pereira 29'; A. Sidhu 31'; Sandhu 36'

Umpires:
Paul Walker (GBR)
Scott Embry (AUS)

18 August 2014
19:30

Spain	6-3	Canada
Fortuny 5', 33'; Castejon 10', 26'; Palet 30', 36'	Report	Sandhu 12', 30'; Panesar 36'

Umpires:
Oliver Tarnoczi (AUT)
Duvaughn Henlon (JAM)

19 August 2014
19:00

Canada	4-1	Bangladesh
Pereira 6'; A. Sidhu 29'; Panesar 34'; Muldoon 35'	Report	Uddin 36'

Umpires:
Rawi Anbananthan (MAS)
Sherif Elamari (EGY)

21 August 2014
16:30

Australia	5-2	Canada
Bird 2'; Stewart 10'; Bretherton 25'; Weyer 29'; Wayne 35'	Report	A. Sidhu 13'; H. Sidhu 36'

Umpires:
Paul Walker (GBR)
Oliver Tarnoczi (AUT)

Quarterfinal

23 August 2014
19:30

Pakistan	7–7	Canada
Mahmood 10'; Atiq 23', 36'; Irshad 23'; Malik 25', 34'; Ali 32'	Report	A. Sidhu 4', 13'; Sandhu 6'; Pereira 16', 22'; H. Sidhu 30', 35'
Penalties
Irshad (penalty shoot-out missed); Atiq (penalty shoot-out scored); Mahmood (penalty shoot-out scored); Atiq (penalty shoot-out missed); Irshad (penalty shoot-out missed)	2–3	(penalty shoot-out missed) A. Sidhu; (penalty shoot-out scored) Panesar; (penalty shoot-out scored) Sandhu; (penalty shoot-out missed) Panesar; (penalty shoot-out scored) Sandhu

Umpires:
Paul Walker (GBR)
Rawi Anbananthan (MAS)

Semifinal

25 August 2014
18:00

Spain	4–4	Canada
Fabregas 2'; Palet 4'; Castejon 13'; Alcalde 30'	Report	A. Sidhu 7', 31'; Sandhu 24'; Panesar 36'
Penalties
Fabregas (penalty shoot-out missed); Castejon (penalty shoot-out scored); Suarez (penalty shoot-out scored); Castejon (penalty shoot-out scored); Suarez (penalty shoot-out scored); Fabregas (penalty shoot-out scored); Castejon (penalty shoot-out missed)	5–6	(penalty shoot-out scored) A. Sidhu; (penalty shoot-out missed) Panesar; (penalty shoot-out scored) Sandhu; (penalty shoot-out scored) A. Sidhu; (penalty shoot-out scored) Panesar; (penalty shoot-out scored) Sandhu; (penalty shoot-out scored) A. Sidhu

Umpires:
Donovan Simmons (BER)
Oliver Tarnoczi (AUT)

Gold medal match

27 August 2014
20:30

Canada (silver)	3–3	Australia
Sandhu 19'; A. Sidhu 34', 36'	Report	Rasmussen 3', 32'; Hendry 21'
Penalties
A. Sidhu (penalty shoot-out scored); Panesar (penalty shoot-out scored); Sandhu (penalty shoot-out missed)	2–3	(penalty shoot-out scored) Bird; (penalty shoot-out scored) Rasmussen; (penalty shoot-out scored) Weyer

Umpires:
Paul Walker (GBR)
Aziz Adimah (GHA)

== Golf ==
Canada qualified one team of two athletes based on the 8 June 2014 IGF Combined World Amateur Golf Rankings.

Individual

Athlete	Event	Round 1		Round 2			Round 3			Total	
Athlete	Event	Score	Rank	Score	Total	Rank	Score	Total	Rank	Score	Rank
Tony Gil	Boys	69 (-3)	5								
Madeline Szeryk	Girls										

Team

Athletes	Event	Round 1 (Foursome)		Round 2 (Fourball)			Round 3 (Individual Stroke)				Total	
Athletes	Event	Score	Rank	Score	Total	Rank	Boy	Girl	Total	Rank	Score	Rank
Tony Gil; Madeline Szeryk	Mixed											

== Gymnastics ==
=== Artistic Gymnastics ===
Canada qualified two athletes based on its performance at the 2014 Junior Pan American Artistic Gymnastics Championships.

Boys

Athlete	Event	Apparatus						Total	Rank
Athlete	Event	F	PH	R	V	PB	HB	Total	Rank
René Cournoyer	Qualification	12.650	10.750	12.950	14.325 Q	12.000	13.650 Q	76.300	19
René Cournoyer	Vault	—N/a			13.883	—N/a		13.883	6
René Cournoyer	Horizontal Bar	—N/a					12.333	12.333	7

Girls

Athlete	Event	Apparatus				Total	Rank
Athlete	Event	F	V	UB	BB	Total	Rank
Sydney Townsend	Qualification	12.500 Q	13.950 Q	12.025	11.550	49.375 Q	13
Sydney Townsend	All-Around	13.600	12.600	11.950	11.650	49.800	12
Sydney Townsend	Vault	13.750	—N/a			13.750	7
Sydney Townsend	Floor	—N/a			12.833	12.833	7

=== Rhythmic Gymnastics ===
Canada qualified one team based on its performance at the 2014 Junior Pan American Rhythmic Championships.

Team

Athletes	Event	Qualification			
Athletes	Event	5 Hoops	10 Clubs	Total	Rank
Cassandra Brand; Crystal Dimov; Alyssa Klyushin; Emma Lozhkin; Vanessa Panov	Team	11.250	11.250	22.500	5

== Judo ==
Canada qualified two athletes based on its performance at the 2013 Cadet World Judo Championships.

Individual

Athlete	Event	Round of 32	Round of 16	Quarterfinals	Semifinals	Rep 1	Rep 2	Rep 3	Rep 4	Final / BM	Rank
Athlete	Event	Opposition Result	Opposition Result	Opposition Result	Opposition Result	Opposition Result	Opposition Result	Opposition Result	Opposition Result	Opposition Result	Rank
Louis Kreiber Gagnon	Boys' -81 kg	—N/a	Snoussi (TUN); W 100-000	Majdov (SRB); L 000-002	Did not advance	—N/a		Farukhi (TJK); W 100-000	Milic (MNE); L 000-100	Did not advance	7
Jessica Klimkait	Girls' -63 kg	—N/a	Sunjevic (MNE); W 002-000	Schwille (GER); W 001-000	Dobre (ROU); L 010-100	—N/a				Polleres (AUT); L 000-000	5

Team

Athletes	Event	Round of 16	Quarterfinals	Semifinals	Final	Rank
Athletes	Event	Opposition Result	Opposition Result	Opposition Result	Opposition Result	Rank
Team Chochishvili; Stefania Adelina Dobre (ROU); Fatim Fofana (CIV); Bogdan Iadov (UKR); Louis Krieber-Gagnon (CAN); Liu Xiaoyu (CHN); Yu-Hsuan Lo (TPE); Marton Sarecz (HUN); Estefania Soriano (DOM)	Mixed Team	Team Kerr (MIX); L 3 – 4	did not advance			9

== Modern Pentathlon ==
Canada qualified one athlete based on the 1 June 2014 Olympic Youth A Pentathlon World Rankings.

Athlete	Event	Fencing Ranking Round (épée one touch)		Swimming (200 m freestyle)			Fencing Final Round (épée one touch)			Combined: Shooting/Running (10 m air pistol)/(3000 m)			Total Points	Final Rank
Athlete	Event	Results	Rank	Time	Rank	Points	Results	Rank	Points	Time	Rank	Points	Total Points	Final Rank
Kali Sayers	Girls' Individual		1											
Kali Sayers (CAN); Nikita Bistrovs (LAT)	Mixed Relay	200	14	1:03.56; 0:56.73 (2:00.29)	4	340		267	17	13:49.26	24	471	1078	22

== Rowing ==
Canada qualified one boat based on its performance at the 2013 World Rowing Junior Championships. Canada later received a reallocation spot in the boy's single sculls event.

Athlete	Event	Heats		Semifinals		Final	
Athlete	Event	Time	Rank	Time	Rank	Time	Rank
Dan de Groot	Boys' single sculls	3:28.47	1	3:22.77	1	3:22.21	Bronze
Caileigh Filmer; Larissa Werbicki	Girls' Pairs	3:36.99	1	3:30.02	1	3:37.75	Bronze

Qualification Legend: FA=Final A (medal); FB=Final B (non-medal); FC=Final C (non-medal); FD=Final D (non-medal); SA/B=Semifinals A/B; SC/D=Semifinals C/D; R=Repechage

== Rugby sevens ==
Canada qualified a girls' team based on its performance at the 2013 Rugby World Cup Sevens.

=== Girls' tournament ===
Roster

- Moanda Anglo
- Catherine Boudreault
- Pamphinette Buisa
- Hannah Darling
- Chanelle Edwards-Challenger
- Ashley Gordon
- Lauren Kerr
- Jenna Morrison
- Kaitlyn Richard
- Cass Schmidt
- Maddy Seatle
- Charity Williams

Group stage

Pos	Team	Pld	W	D	L	PF	PA	PD	Pts
1	Australia	5	5	0	0	146	17	+129	15
2	China	5	4	0	1	144	32	+112	13
3	Canada	5	3	0	2	108	71	+37	11
4	United States	5	1	1	3	59	98	−39	8
5	Spain	5	1	1	3	44	129	−85	8
6	Tunisia	5	0	0	5	12	166	−154	5

17 August 2014
09:30

Canada	10 - 24	China

Youth Olympic Sports Park

17 August 2014
16:30

Canada	19 - 14	United States

Youth Olympic Sports Park

18 August 2014
09:30

Canada	31 - 0	Spain

Youth Olympic Sports Park

18 August 2014
16:00

Canada	43 - 12	Tunisia

Youth Olympic Sports Park

19 August 2014
10:00

Australia	21 - 5	Canada

Youth Olympic Sports Park

Semifinal

19 August 2014
15:30

China	19 - 26	Canada

Youth Olympic Sports Park

Gold Medal Match

20 August 2014
09:00

Australia	38 - 10	Canada (silver)

Youth Olympic Sports Park

== Sailing ==
Canada qualified one boat based on its performance at the 2013 World Byte CII Championships.

Athlete	Event	Race											Net Points	Final Rank
Athlete	Event	1	2	3	4	5	6	7	8	9	10	M*	Net Points	Final Rank
Justin Vittecoq	Boys' Byte CII	2	11	(18)	17	3	3	12	20	—N/a		86.00	68.00	11

== Shooting ==
Canada qualified two shooters based on its performance at the Americas Qualification Event held during a Shooting World Cup event in Fort Benning.

Canada's all quotas were obtained in 10m Air Pistol events. Peter Karl Otto Schulze ended 2nd in Men's Air Pistol and won a quota. Andrey-Ann Le Sieur finished 5th at Women's Air Pistol and got a quota, even though her compatriot Dayna Marie Boser ended 4th in the same event, and that was because Le Sieur's MQS was slightly above the qualification score.

Individual

Athlete	Event	Qualification		Final	
Athlete	Event	Points	Rank	Points	Rank
Peter Karl Otto Schulze	Boys' 10m Air Pistol	533	18	did not advance	
Audrey-Anne Le Sieur	Girls' 10m Air Pistol	364	14	did not advance	

Team

Athletes	Event	Qualification		Round of 16	Quarterfinals	Semifinals	Final / BM	Rank
Athletes	Event	Points	Rank	Opposition Result	Opposition Result	Opposition Result	Opposition Result	Rank
Peter Karl Otto Schulze (CAN); Kim Minjung (KOR)	Mixed Team 10m Air Pistol		Q	Chung (TPE); Igityan (ARM); L	did not advance			17
Audrey-Anne Le Sieur (CAN); Wu Jiayu (CHN)	Mixed Team 10m Air Pistol		14 Q	Deswal (IND); Ceper (SLO); L 5 - 10	did not advance			17

== Swimming ==
Canada qualified seven swimmers.

Boys

Athlete	Event	Heat		Semifinal		Final	
Athlete	Event	Time	Rank	Time	Rank	Time	Rank
Javier Acevedo	50 m freestyle	23.49	15	23.19	12	—N/a	
Javier Acevedo	100 m freestyle	50.40	4	50.15	4	50.29	8
Javier Acevedo	200 m freestyle	1:51.41	9	—N/a			
Javier Acevedo	100 m backstroke	56.77	14	57.34	16	—N/a	
Javier Acevedo	200 m individual medley	DNS		—N/a			
Colin Gilbert	400 m freestyle	4:02.51	25	—N/a			
Colin Gilbert	800 m freestyle	—N/a				8:20.43	18
Matthew Mac	50 m backstroke	27.59	25	—N/a			
Matthew Mac	200 m backstroke	2:07.24	23	—N/a			
Matthew Mac	200 m butterfly	2:07.74	22	—N/a			

Girls

Athlete	Event	Heat		Semifinal		Final	
Athlete	Event	Time	Rank	Time	Rank	Time	Rank
Kelsey Wog	50 m freestyle	27.07	28	—N/a			
Kelsey Wog	100 m breaststroke	1:11.67	15	1:10.60	13	—N/a	
Kelsey Wog	200 m breaststroke	2:31.92	6	—N/a		2:29.89	6
Kelsey Wog	200 m individual medley	2:17.55	8	—N/a		2:17.86	8
Danielle Hanus	100 m freestyle	DNS		—N/a		—N/a	
Danielle Hanus	50 m backstroke	1:02.19	3	1:02.12	5	1:01.81	7
Danielle Hanus	100 m backstroke	1:02.19	3	1:02.12	5	1:01.81	7
Danielle Hanus	200 m backstroke	2:15.38	7	—N/a		2:15.02	7
Danielle Hanus	100 m butterfly	1:01.44	13	DNS		—N/a	
Mackenzie Glover	50 m backstroke	30.72	31	—N/a			
Mackenzie Glover	100 m backstroke	1:03.03	4	1:03.20	8	—N/a	
Mackenzie Glover	200 m backstroke	2:14.74	6	—N/a		2:13.09	4
Danika Huizinga	50 m butterfly	27.90	5	28.17	8	—N/a	
Danika Huizinga	100 m butterfly	1:01.75	15	1:01.43	13	—N/a	
Danika Huizinga	200 m butterfly	DSQ		—N/a		—N/a	
Mackenzie Glover; Danielle Hanus; Danika Huizinga; Kelsey Wog	4 × 100 m freestyle relay	3:53.08	6	—N/a		3:54.03	8
Mackenzie Glover; Danielle Hanus; Danika Huizinga; Kelsey Wog	4 × 100 m medley relay	4:11.79	4	—N/a		4:10.73	5

Mixed

Athlete	Event	Heat		Final	
Athlete	Event	Time	Rank	Time	Rank
Javier Acevedo; Danielle Hanus; Danika Huizinga; Matthew Mac	4 × 100 m freestyle relay	3:38.82	5	—N/a	
Javier Acevedo; Danielle Hanus; Danika Huizinga; Matthew Mac	4 × 100 m medley relay	4:05.06	16	—N/a	

== Table Tennis ==
Canada qualified one athlete based on its performance at the North American Qualification Event.

Singles

Athlete	Event	Group Stage	Rank	Round of 16	Quarterfinals	Semifinals	Final / BM	Rank
Athlete	Event	Opposition Score	Rank	Opposition Score	Opposition Score	Opposition Score	Opposition Score	Rank
Anqi Luo	Girls	Group H Yee (SIN); W 3 - 0	2 Q	Liu (CHN); L 0 - 4	did not advance			9
Anqi Luo	Girls	Khetkhuan (THA); L 0 - 3	2 Q	Liu (CHN); L 0 - 4	did not advance			9
Anqi Luo	Girls	Lagsir (ALG); W 3 - 0	2 Q	Liu (CHN); L 0 - 4	did not advance			9

Team

Athletes	Event	Group Stage	Rank	Round of 16	Quarterfinals	Semifinals	Final / BM	Rank
Athletes	Event	Opposition Score	Rank	Opposition Score	Opposition Score	Opposition Score	Opposition Score	Rank
Intercontinental 1 Anqi Luo (CAN); Brian Afanador (PUR)	Mixed	Africa 3 Salah (DJI); Alassani (TOG); W 3 - 0	2 Q	China; Liu (CHN); Fan (CHN); L 0 - 2	did not advance			9
Intercontinental 1 Anqi Luo (CAN); Brian Afanador (PUR)	Mixed	Japan; Kato (JPN); Muramatsu (JPN); L	2 Q	China; Liu (CHN); Fan (CHN); L 0 - 2	did not advance			9
Intercontinental 1 Anqi Luo (CAN); Brian Afanador (PUR)	Mixed	India; Mukherjee (IND); Yadav (IND); W 2 - 1	2 Q	China; Liu (CHN); Fan (CHN); L 0 - 2	did not advance			9

Qualification Legend: Q=Main Bracket (medal); qB=Consolation Bracket (non-medal)

== Taekwondo ==
Canada qualified one athlete based on its performance at the Taekwondo Qualification Tournament.

Boys

Athlete	Event	Round of 16	Quarterfinals	Semifinals	Final	Rank
Athlete	Event	Opposition Result	Opposition Result	Opposition Result	Opposition Result	Rank
Kevin Saint-Jean	−73 kg	—N/a	Salehimehr (IRI); L 5– 10	did not advance		5

== Triathlon ==
Canada qualified two athletes based on its performance at the 2014 American Youth Olympic Games Qualifier.

Individual

Athlete	Event	Swim (750m)	Trans 1	Bike (20 km)	Trans 2	Run (5 km)	Total Time	Rank
Charles Paquet	Boys	09:35	00:44	28:43	00:26	16:27	0:55:55	9
Emily Wagner	Girls	10:06	00:48	33:20	00:25	19:58	1:04:37	17

Relay

Athlete	Event	Total Times per Athlete (Swim 250m, Bike 6.6 km, Run 1.8 km)	Total Group Time	Rank
America 1 Katherine Vanesa Clemant Materano (VEN); Javier Martin (CHI); Stephanie Jenks (USA); Charles Paquet (CAN)	Mixed Relay	23:14; 20:33; 22:08; 19:46	1:25:41	7
America 2 Emily Wagner (CAN); Eduardo Londono Naranjo (COL); Catalina Salazar (CHI); Seth Rider (USA)	Mixed Relay	21:31; 19:53; 23:56; 20:20	1:25:40	6

== Wrestling ==
Canada qualified four athletes based on its performance at the 2014 Pan American Cadet Championships.

Key:

- VT - Victory by Fall.
- PP - Decision by Points - the loser with technical points.
- PO - Decision by Points - the loser without technical points.

Boys

Athlete	Event	Group stage				Final / RM	Rank
Athlete	Event	Opposition Score	Opposition Score	Opposition Score	Rank	Opposition Score	Rank
Alexander Moore	Freestyle -63kg	Lloyd (NZL); W	Montero (VEN); L	Kumar (IND); L 1-3 ^{PP}	3 Q	Steyn (RSA); L 0-4 ^{VT}	6
Arshdeep Gurm	Freestyle -76kg	Vou (ASA); W 4–0	Yamasaki (JPN); L	Hovsepyan (ARM); L	3 Q	Barraj (TUN); L 0-4 ^{ST}	6
Ramandeep Khehira	Greco-Roman -85kg	Bemalian (RUS); L 0-4	McMoore (ASA); W 4-0	Okhonov (TJK); L 0-4	3 Q	Pal (IND); L 0-4 ^{ST}	6

Girls

Athlete	Event	Group stage				Final / RM	Rank
Athlete	Event	Opposition Score	Opposition Score	Opposition Score	Rank	Opposition Score	Rank
Tianna Kennett	Freestyle -52kg	Gurbanova (AZE); L	Vasquez (ESA); W 4 - 0	Kremzer (UKR); L	3 Q	Djullibaeva (UZB); L 1-4 ^{ST}	6

== See also ==
- Canada at the 2014 Commonwealth Games
- Canada at the 2014 Winter Olympics
