= Swimming at the 2014 Commonwealth Games – Women's 4 × 200 metre freestyle relay =

Women's 4 × 200 metre freestyle relay at the 2014 Commonwealth Games
- Venue: Tollcross International Swimming Centre
- Dates: 26 July 2014
- Competitors: 44 from 9 nations
- Winning time: 7:49.90 GR

Medalists
gold medal	Emma McKeon; Alicia Coutts; Brittany Elmslie; Bronte Barratt; Madeline Groves*; Remy Fairweather*	Australia
silver medal	Samantha Cheverton; Brittany MacLean; Alyson Ackman; Emily Overholt	Canada
bronze medal	Siobhan-Marie O'Connor; Amelia Maughan; Ellie Faulkner; Rebecca Turner; Jess Lloyd*; Aimee Willmott*	England

The women's 4 × 200 metre freestyle relay event at the 2014 Commonwealth Games as part of the swimming programme took place on 26 July at the Tollcross International Swimming Centre in Glasgow, Scotland.

The medals were presented by Kamalesh Sharma, Secretary-General of the Commonwealth of Nations and the quaichs were presented by Tim Griffin, Vice-President and General Manager of Dell UK.

== Records ==
Prior to this competition, the existing world and Commonwealth Games records were as follows.

World record	China (CHN); Yang Yu (1:55.47); Zhu Qianwei (1:55.79); Liu Jing (1:56.09); Pang Jiaying (1:54.73)	7:42.08	Rome, Italy	30 July 2009
Commonwealth record				
Games record	Australia; Kylie Palmer (1:58.51); Blair Evans (1:57.47); Bronte Barratt (1:58.33); Meagen Nay (1:59.40)	7:53.71	Delhi, India	6 October 2010

The following records were established during the competition:

Date	Event	Nation	Swimmers	Time	Record
26 July	Final	Australia	Emma McKeon (1:56.01); Alicia Coutts (1:59.34); Brittany Elmslie (1:57.89); Bronte Barratt (1:56.66)	7:49.90	GR

== Results ==
=== Heats ===
Rank	Heat	Lane	Nation	Swimmers	Time	Notes
1	2	4	Australia	Brittany Elmslie (1:58.17); Madeline Groves (1:59.78); Remy Fairweather (1:58.97); Bronte Barratt (2:01.03)	7:57.95	Q
2	2	3	New Zealand	Samantha Lucie-Smith (1:58.97); Emma Robinson (2:00.20); Natasha Hind (2:01.79); Samantha Lee (2:01.32)	8:02.28	Q
3	2	5	England	Jess Lloyd (2:03.42); Amelia Maughan (1:59.62); Aimee Willmott (2:00.44); Rebecca Turner (1:59.16)	8:02.64	Q
4	1	4	Canada	Samantha Cheverton (2:01.06); Brittany MacLean (2:01.97); Alyson Ackman (2:03.42); Emily Overholt (2:04.00)	8:10.45	Q
5	2	6	Scotland	Megan Gilchrist (2:01.72); Rachel Masson (2:02.98); Lucy Hope (2:03.58); Rachael O'Donnell (2:02.98)	8:11.26	Q
6	2	2	Wales	Sian Morgan (2:02.56); Danielle Stirrat (2:03.76); Mari Davies (2:03.06); Rachel Williams (2:04.19)	8:13.57	Q
7	1	3	South Africa	Marlies Ross (2:02.62); Erin Gallagher (2:07.30); Karin Prinsloo (2:00.21); Rene Warnes (2:04.06)	8:14.19	Q
8	1	6	Singapore	Lynette Lim (2:04.62); Amanda Lim (2:05.93); Quah Ting Wen (2:04.77); Marina Chan (2:09.86)	8:25.18	Q
	1	5	Northern Ireland	Rachel Bethel; Bethany Firth; Gemma Kane; Danielle Hill		DSQ

=== Final ===
Rank	Lane	Nation	Swimmers	Time	Notes
1st place, gold medalist(s)	4	Australia	Emma McKeon (1:56.01); Alicia Coutts (1:59.34); Brittany Elmslie (1:57.89); Bronte Barratt (1:56.66)	7:49.90	GR
2nd place, silver medalist(s)	6	Canada	Samantha Cheverton (1:57.99); Brittany MacLean (1:56.87); Alyson Ackman (1:58.43); Emily Overholt (1:58.38)	7:51.67	
3rd place, bronze medalist(s)	3	England	Siobhan-Marie O'Connor (1:57.19); Amelia Maughan (1:59.53); Ellie Faulkner (1:58.08); Rebecca Turner (1:57.65)	7:52.45	
4	5	New Zealand	Lauren Boyle (1:57.74); Samantha Lucie-Smith (1:58.96); Samantha Lee (2:00.22); Emma Robinson (2:00.55)	7:57.47	
5	2	Scotland	Caitlin McClatchey (1:58.54); Hannah Miley (1:58.18); Megan Gilchrist (2:02.24); Rachel Masson (2:00.10)	7:59.06	
6	1	South Africa	Karin Prinsloo (1:59.18); Marlies Ross (2:00.43); Rene Warnes (2:05.23); Erin Gallagher (2:03.28)	8:08.12	
7	8	Singapore	Lynette Lim (2:03.02); Amanda Lim (2:04.48); Quah Ting Wen (2:02.81); Marina Chan (2:06.08)	8:16.39	
8	7	Wales	Sian Morgan; Danielle Stirrat; Rachel Williams; Ellena Jones		DSQ
