= Swimming at the 2014 Commonwealth Games – Women's 4 × 100 metre freestyle relay =

2014 swimming competition

Women's 4 × 100 metre freestyle relay at the 2014 Commonwealth Games
- Venue: Tollcross International Swimming Centre
- Dates: 24 July 2014
- Competitors: 53 from 11 nations
- Winning time: 3:30.98 WR

Medalists
| gold medal | Bronte Campbell; Melanie Schlanger; Emma McKeon; Cate Campbell; Madeline Groves*; Brittany Elmslie*; Alicia Coutts* | Australia |
| silver medal | Siobhan-Marie O'Connor; Francesca Halsall; Amy Smith; Rebecca Turner; Lauren Quigley*; Jess Lloyd*; Amelia Maughan* | England |
| bronze medal | Victoria Poon; Sandrine Mainville; Michelle Williams; Alyson Ackman | Canada |

The women's 4 × 100 metre freestyle relay event at the 2014 Commonwealth Games as part of the swimming programme took place on 24 July at the Tollcross International Swimming Centre in Glasgow, Scotland.

The medals were presented by Maurice Watkins, Chairman of British Swimming and the quaichs were presented by Denise Holmes, Emirates' Sales Manager for Scotland and North East England.

== Records ==
Prior to this competition, the existing world and Commonwealth Games records were as follows.

| World record | Netherlands (NED); Inge Dekker (53.61); Ranomi Kromowidjojo (52.30); Femke Heemskerk (53.03); Marleen Veldhuis (52.78) | 3:31.72 | Rome, Italy | 26 July 2009 |
| Commonwealth record | | | | |
| Games record | Australia; Alicia Coutts (54.17); Marieke Guehrer (54.08); Felicity Galvez (53.98); Emily Seebohm (54.13) | 3:36.36 | Delhi, India | 8 October 2010 |

The following records were established during the competition:

| Date | Event | Nation | Swimmers | Time | Record |
|---|---|---|---|---|---|
| 24 July | Heat | Australia | Madeline Groves (54.77); Brittany Elmslie (53.82); Alicia Coutts (53.51); Melanie Schlanger (52.47) | 3:34.57 | GR |
| 24 July | Final | Australia | Bronte Campbell (53.15); Melanie Schlanger (52.76); Emma McKeon (52.91); Cate Campbell (52.16) | 3:30.98 | WR |

== Results ==
=== Heats ===
| Rank | Heat | Lane | Nation | Swimmers | Time | Notes |
|---|---|---|---|---|---|---|
| 1 | 2 | 4 | Australia | Madeline Groves (54.77); Brittany Elmslie (53.82); Alicia Coutts (53.51); Melanie Schlanger (52.47) | 3:34.57 | Q, GR |
| 2 | 2 | 5 | England | Lauren Quigley (55.57); Jess Lloyd (55.22); Rebecca Turner (54.58); Amelia Maughan (55.51) | 3:40.88 | Q |
| 3 | 1 | 4 | Canada | Victoria Poon (55.52); Sandrine Mainville (55.13); Michelle Williams (54.95); Alyson Ackman (55.80) | 3:41.40 | Q |
| 4 | 1 | 3 | New Zealand | Laura Quilter (55.86); Natasha Hind (56.69); Samantha Lee (56.09); Ellen Quirke (56.68) | 3:45.32 | Q |
| 5 | 2 | 2 | Scotland | Rachel Masson (56.56); Sian Harkin (54.95); Lucy Hope (56.91); Rachael O'Donnell (57.37) | 3:45.79 | Q |
| 6 | 2 | 7 | Wales | Sian Morgan (57.27); Danielle Stirrat (57.84); Mari Davies (57.36); Hannah McCarthy (56.99) | 3:49.46 | Q |
| 7 | 1 | 2 | Singapore | Marina Chan (57.88); Amanda Lim (57.00); Lynette Lim (57.94); Quah Ting Wen (58.38) | 3:51.20 | Q |
| 8 | 2 | 3 | Northern Ireland | Rachel Bethel (59.28); Sycerika McMahon (57.67); Bethany Firth (58.78); Danielle Hill (58.80) | 3:54.53 | Q |
| 9 | 1 | 5 | Fiji | Matelita Buadromo (59.26); Caroline Puamau (59.42); Tieri Erasito (1:03.26); Cheyenne Rova (1:00.86) | 4:02.80 | |
| 10 | 2 | 6 | Papua New Guinea | Jocelyn Flynn (1:07.63); Tegan McCarthy (1:07.88); Barbara Vali-Skelton (1:04.35); Savannah Tkatchenko (1:05.15) | 4:25.01 | |
| | 1 | 6 | South Africa | Trudi Maree (57.32); Marlies Ross; Karin Prinsloo; Erin Gallager | (3:44.86) | DSQ |

=== Final ===
| Rank | Lane | Nation | Swimmers | Time | Notes |
|---|---|---|---|---|---|
| 1st place, gold medalist(s) | 4 | Australia | Bronte Campbell (53.15) GR; Melanie Schlanger (52.76); Emma McKeon (52.91); Cate Campbell (52.16) | 3:30.98 | WR |
| 2nd place, silver medalist(s) | 5 | England | Siobhan-Marie O'Connor (54.06); Francesca Halsall (53.17); Amy Smith (53.88); Rebecca Turner (54.61) | 3:35.72 | NR |
| 3rd place, bronze medalist(s) | 3 | Canada | Victoria Poon (55.29); Sandrine Mainville (54.69); Michelle Williams (54.66); Alyson Ackman (55.36) | 3:40.00 | |
| 4 | 6 | New Zealand | Samantha Lucie-Smith (55.86); Laura Quilter (55.22); Samantha Lee (56.43); Ellen Quirke (56.32) | 3:43.83 | |
| 5 | 2 | Scotland | Rachel Masson (56.26); Sian Harkin (55.47); Lucy Hope (57.23); Caitlin McClatchey (55.60) | 3:44.56 | |
| 6 | 7 | Wales | Sian Morgan (57.05); Chloe Tutton (55.76); Mari Davies (56.70); Hannah McCarthy (55.89) | 3:45.40 | |
| 7 | 1 | Singapore | Amanda Lim (57.40); Marina Chan (57.45); Lynette Lim (57.93); Quah Ting Wen (56.91) | 3:49.69 | |
| 8 | 8 | Northern Ireland | Sycerika McMahon (57.27); Bethany Firth (58.43); Rachel Bethel (58.44); Danielle Hill (58.74) | 3:52.88 | |
