= Swimming at the 2014 Summer Youth Olympics – Girls' 50 metre backstroke =

Girls' 50 metre backstroke at the 2014 Summer Youth Olympics
- Venue: Nanjing Olympic Sports Centre
- Dates: August 20, 2014 (heats & semifinals); August 21, 2014 (final)
- Competitors: 38
- Winning time: 28.36

Medalists
gold medal	Maaike de Waard	Netherlands
silver medal	Jessica Fullalove	Great Britain
bronze medal	Gabrielle Fa'amausili	New Zealand

The girls' 50 metre backstroke event in swimming at the 2014 Summer Youth Olympics took place on 20–21 August at the Nanjing Olympic Sports Centre in Nanjing, China.

== Results ==
=== Heats ===
The heats were held at 10:00.

Rank	Heat	Lane	Name	Nationality	Time	Notes
1	5	4	Gabrielle Fa'amausili	New Zealand	28.71	Q
2	5	3	Danielle Hanus	Canada	28.94	Q
3	4	4	Maaike de Waard	Netherlands	29.03	Q
4	5	5	Jessica Fullalove	Great Britain	29.13	Q
5	4	5	Clara Smiddy	United States	29.15	Q
6	4	8	Eleni Koutsouveli	Greece	29.31	Q
7	5	2	Tereza Grusova	Czech Republic	29.49	Q
8	4	3	Bobbi Gichard	New Zealand	29.50	Q
9	3	3	Natalia de Luccas	Brazil	29.51	Q
10	3	1	Pauline Mahieu	France	29.53	Q
11	4	6	Nguyen Thi Anh Vien	Vietnam	29.54	Q
12	3	5	Mandy Feldbinder	Germany	29.72	Q
13	3	4	Iryna Hlavnyk	Ukraine	29.74	Q
14	1	2	Nikola Petrika	Poland	29.76	Q
15	2	2	Irina Prikhodko	Russia	29.78	Q
16	3	2	Laura Yus Fernandez	Spain	29.84	Q
17	2	8	Naomi Ruele	Botswana	29.86	
18	4	2	Ema Sarar	Croatia	29.89	
19	3	8	Emma Terebo	France	29.93	
20	5	6	Katsiaryna Afanasyeva	Belarus	29.99	
20	5	8	Karolina Hajkova	Slovakia	29.99	
22	2	5	Yekaterina Dymchenko	Kazakhstan	30.04	
23	4	7	Lena Kreundl	Austria	30.10	
24	4	1	Miono Takeuchi	Japan	30.14	
25	2	4	Rozaliya Nasretdinova	Russia	30.15	
26	3	6	Esmee Bos	Netherlands	30.37	
27	1	5	Zanre Oberholzer	Namibia	30.39	
28	5	1	Elisavet Panti	Greece	30.41	
29	5	7	Ambra Esposito	Italy	30.47	
30	3	7	Tatiana Perstniova	Moldova	30.58	
31	2	7	Mackenzie Glover	Canada	30.72	
32	1	6	Amy Forrester	Australia	30.78	
33	2	6	Carita Luukkanen	Finland	30.98	
34	1	4	Courtney Mykkanen	United States	30.99	
35	1	3	Brienne Renfurm	Suriname	31.43	
36	1	1	Joyce Tafatatha	Malawi	31.59	
37	1	7	Laoise Fleming	Ireland	31.64	
38	1	8	Calina Panuve	Tonga	42.42	
-	2	1	Svenja Stoffel	Switzerland	DNS	
-	2	3	Mariam Sakr	Egypt	DNS	

=== Semifinals ===
The semifinals were held at 18:04.

Rank	Heat	Lane	Name	Nationality	Time	Notes
1	2	4	Gabrielle Fa'amausili	New Zealand	28.78	Q
2	1	4	Danielle Hanus	Canada	28.84	Q
3	2	5	Maaike de Waard	Netherlands	28.88	Q
4	1	5	Jessica Fullalove	Great Britain	28.94	Q
5	1	6	Bobbi Gichard	New Zealand	29.09	Q
6	2	3	Clara Smiddy	United States	29.11	Q
7	1	3	Eleni Koutsouveli	Greece	29.28	Q
7	2	8	Irina Prikhodko	Russia	29.28	Q
9	2	6	Tereza Grusova	Czech Republic	29.37	
10	2	2	Natalia de Luccas	Brazil	29.40	
11	2	1	Iryna Hlavnyk	Ukraine	29.51	
12	2	7	Nguyen Thi Anh Vien	Vietnam	29.57	
13	1	2	Pauline Mahieu	France	29.66	
14	1	7	Mandy Feldbinder	Germany	29.75	
15	1	1	Nikola Petrika	Poland	29.83	
16	1	8	Laura Yus Fernandez	Spain	29.99	

=== Final ===
The final was held at 18:46.

Rank	Lane	Name	Nationality	Time	Notes
1st place, gold medalist(s)	3	Maaike de Waard	Netherlands	28.36	
2nd place, silver medalist(s)	6	Jessica Fullalove	Great Britain	28.66	
3rd place, bronze medalist(s)	4	Gabrielle Fa'amausili	New Zealand	28.69	
4	5	Danielle Hanus	Canada	28.91	
4	7	Clara Smiddy	United States	28.91	
6	2	Bobbi Gichard	New Zealand	29.02	
7	1	Eleni Koutsouveli	Greece	29.30	
8	8	Irina Prikhodko	Russia	29.34	
