= Swimming at the 2015 World Aquatics Championships – Women's 4 × 100 metre medley relay =

Women's 4 × 100 metre medley relay at the 2015 World Aquatics Championships
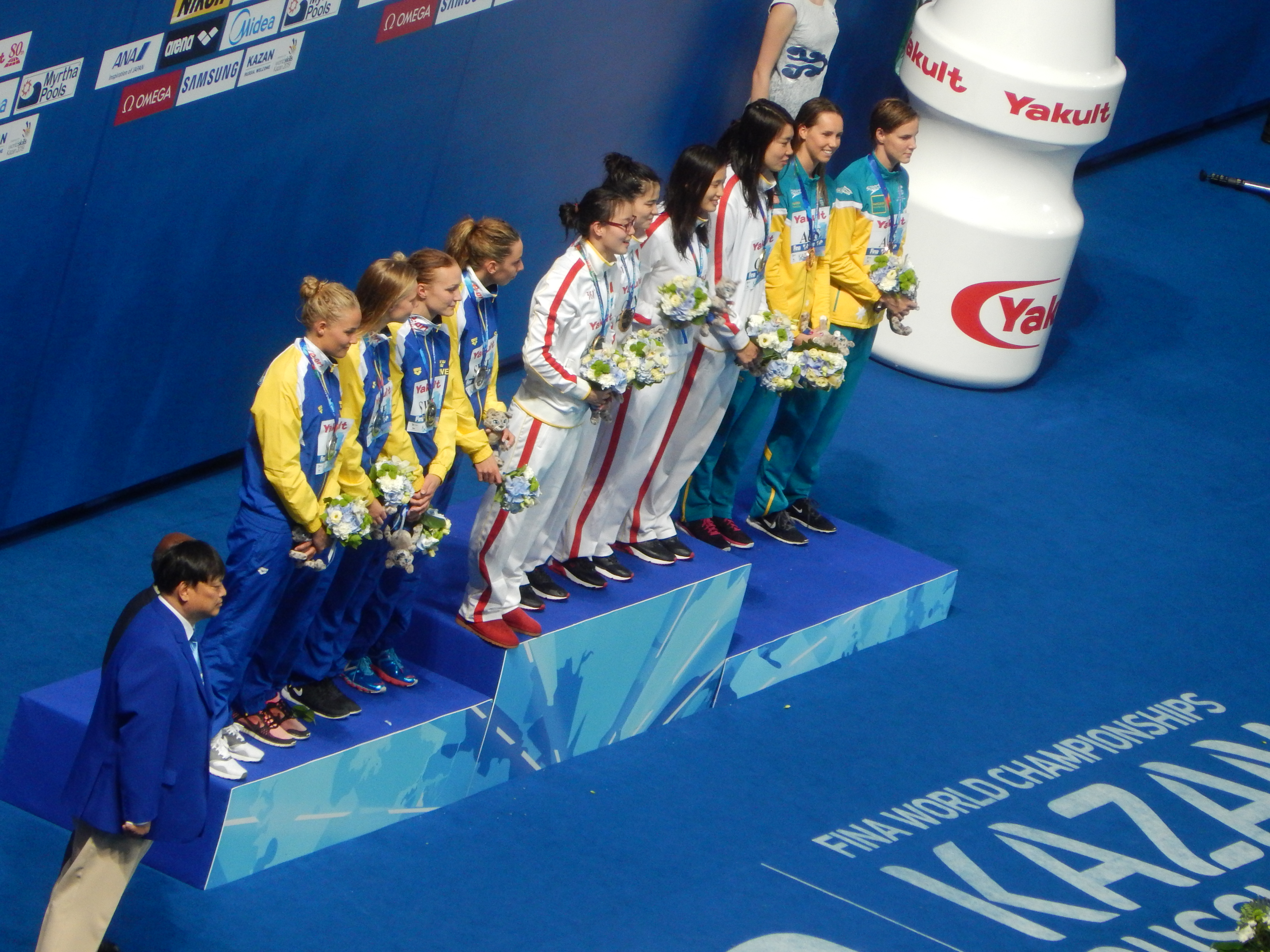
- Victory Ceremony
- Dates: 9 August (heats and final)
- Competitors: 111 from 25 nations
- Winning time: 3:54.41

Medalists
gold medal	Fu Yuanhui; Shi Jinglin; Lu Ying; Shen Duo; Chen Xinyi; Qiu Yuhan	China
silver medal	Michelle Coleman; Jennie Johansson; Sarah Sjöström; Louise Hansson	Sweden
bronze medal	Emily Seebohm; Taylor McKeown; Emma McKeon; Bronte Campbell; Madison Wilson; Lorna Tonks; Madeline Groves; Melanie Wright	Australia

The Women's 4 × 100 metre medley relay competition of the swimming events at the 2015 World Aquatics Championships was held on 9 August with the heats and with the final.

== Records ==
Prior to the competition, the existing world and championship records were as follows.

World record	United States	3:52.05	London, Great Britain	4 August 2012
Competition record	China	3:52.19	Rome, Italy	1 August 2009

== Results ==
=== Heats ===
The heats were held at 10:48.

Rank	Heat	Lane	Nation	Swimmers	Time	Notes
1	1	7	China	Fu Yuanhui (59.24); Shi Jinglin (1:06.35); Chen Xinyi (57.42); Qiu Yuhan (54.03)	3:57.04	Q
2	2	4	United States	Kathleen Baker (59.98); Micah Lawrence (1:07.10); Kendyl Stewart (56.86); Margo Geer (53.18)	3:57.12	Q
3	1	6	Sweden	Michelle Coleman (1:00.55); Jennie Johansson (1:06.20); Sarah Sjöström (56.10); Louise Hansson (54.44)	3:57.29	Q
4	3	6	Australia	Madison Wilson (59.56); Lorna Tonks (1:07.34); Madeline Groves (58.18); Melanie Wright (52.87)	3:57.95	Q
5	3	5	Denmark	Mie Ø. Nielsen (59.67); Rikke Møller Pedersen (1:07.19); Jeanette Ottesen (57.37); Pernille Blume (54.15)	3:58.38	Q
6	2	1	Canada	Dominique Bouchard (1:00.39); Rachel Nicol (1:07.01); Noemie Thomas (57.55); Sandrine Mainville (54.07)	3:59.02	Q
7	1	2	Great Britain	Lauren Quigley (1:00.38); Siobhan-Marie O'Connor (1:06.75); Rachael Kelly (57.89); Rebecca Turner (55.00)	4:00.02	Q
8	3	3	Japan	Sayaka Akase (1:01.55); Kanako Watanabe (1:07.07); Natsumi Hoshi (57.93); Miki Uchida (53.88)	4:00.43	Q
9	3	1	Italy	Elena Gemo (1:01.21); Arianna Castiglioni (1:06.93); Ilaria Bianchi (58.25); Erika Ferraioli (54.53)	4:00.92	
10	2	7	Russia	Daria Ustinova (1:00.13); Vitalina Simonova (1:07.14); Nataliya Lovtsova (59.39); Veronika Popova (54.46)	4:01.12	
11	3	0	Germany	Lisa Graf (1:01.19); Vanessa Grimberg (1:07.71); Alexandra Wenk (57.87); Annika Bruhn (54.63)	4:01.40	
12	2	3	France	Béryl Gastaldello (1:00.60); Charlotte Bonnet (1:09.08); Marie Wattel (57.77); Anna Santamans (54.68)	4:02.13	
13	2	0	Finland	Mimosa Jallow (1:00.64) NR; Jenna Laukkanen (1:07.10); Emilia Pikkarainen (59.47); Hanna-Maria Seppälä (55.09)	4:02.30	NR
14	2	2	Brazil	Etiene Medeiros (1:01.25); Jhennifer Conceição (1:09.28); Daynara de Paula (58.54); Larissa Oliveira (54.17)	4:03.24	
15	1	5	Czech Republic	Simona Baumrtová (1:00.88); Petra Chocová (1:07.80); Lucie Svěcená (59.96); Anna Kolářová (54.80)	4:03.44	NR
16	3	9	Spain	Duane Da Rocha (1:01.63); Jessica Vall (1:07.30); Judit Ignacio Sorribes (59.15); Melani Costa (55.83)	4:03.91	
17	1	4	Greece	Theodora Drakou (1:01.35); Aikaterini Sarakatsani (1:08.80); Anna Ntountounaki (58.49); Theodora Giareni (55.65)	4:04.29	NR
18	1	3	Poland	Alicja Tchórz (1:00.88); Dominika Sztandera (1:09.26); Anna Dowgiert (59.91); Katarzyna Wilk (54.38)	4:04.43	NR
18	2	5	Iceland	Eygló Ósk Gústafsdóttir (1:00.42); Hrafnhildur Lúthersdóttir (1:06.99); Jóhanna Gústafsdóttir (1:01.88); Bryndis Hansen (55.14)	4:04.43	NR
20	3	7	Hong Kong	Stephanie Au (1:00.95) NR; Siobhán Haughey (1:08.70); Sze Hang Yu (59.60); Camille Cheng (55.29)	4:04.54	
21	3	8	Turkey	Halime Zülal Zeren (1:03.21); Viktoriya Zeynep Gunes (1:06.99); Gizem Bozkurt (1:00.94); Ekaterina Avramova (55.20)	4:06.34	NR
22	3	2	Venezuela	Jeserik Pinto (1:04.66); Mercedes Toledo (1:10.06); Isabella Páez (1:00.57); Arlene Semeco (56.45)	4:11.74	NR
23	2	6	Singapore	Quah Ting Wen (1:05.26); Samantha Yeo (1:11.24); Marina Chan (1:02.36); Amanda Lim (58.40)	4:17.26	
24	2	8	Mexico	Lourdes Villaseñor (1:05.34); Daniela Carrillo (1:10.55); Sharo Rodríguez (1:03.41); Montserrat Ortuño (59.85)	4:19.15	
25	2	9	Moldova	Tatiana Perstniova (1:04.57); Tatiana Chișca (1:12.61); Alexandra Vinicenco (1:08.45); Mihaela Bat (1:00.92)	4:26.55	
	3	4	Netherlands	Sharon van Rouwendaal; Moniek Nijhuis; Inge Dekker; Femke Heemskerk		DNS

=== Final ===
The final was held at 19:25.

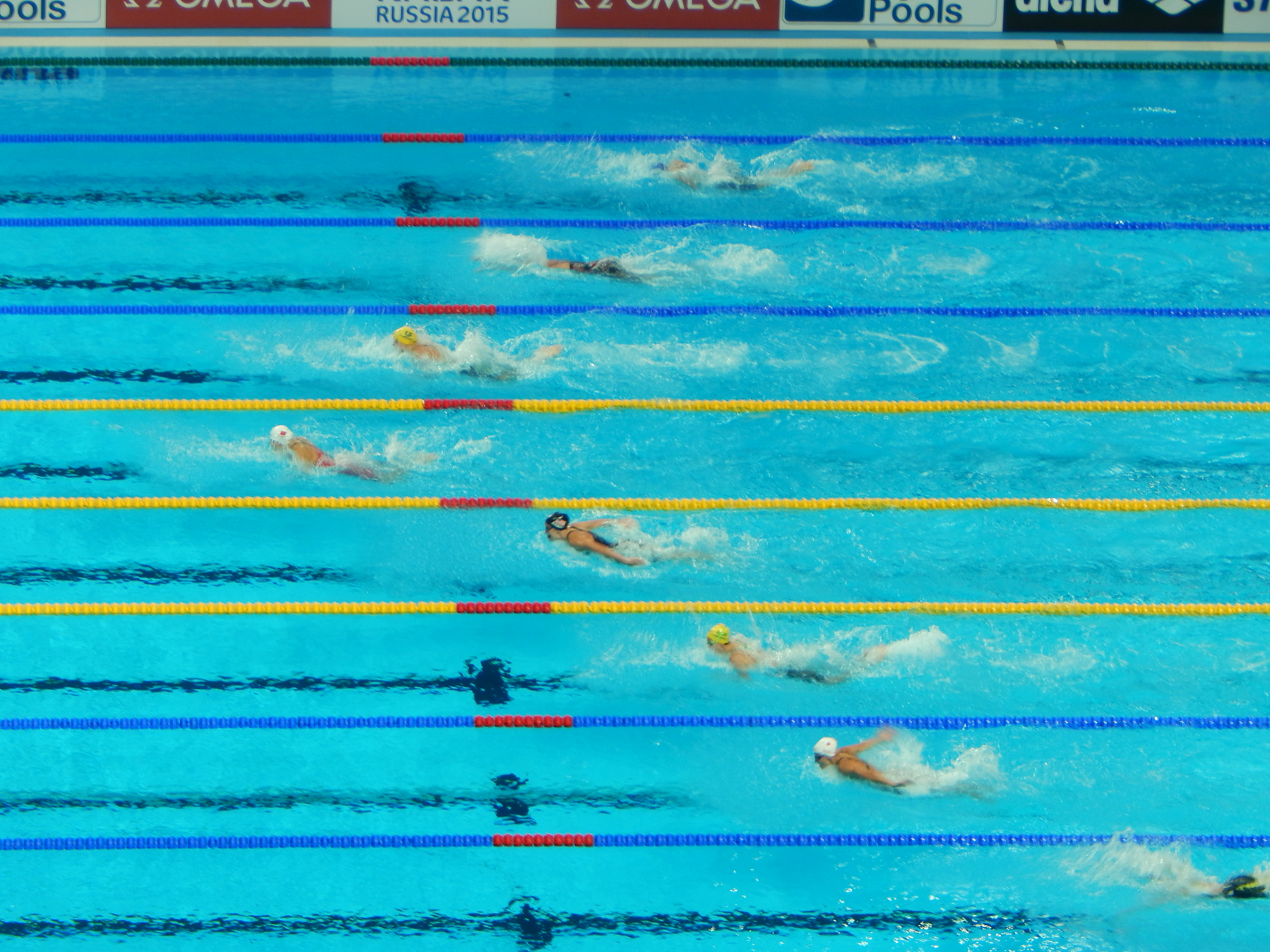

Rank	Lane	Nation	Swimmers	Time	Notes
1st place, gold medalist(s)	4	China	Fu Yuanhui (59.29); Shi Jinglin (1:05.56); Lu Ying (56.56); Shen Duo (53.00)	3:54.41	
2nd place, silver medalist(s)	3	Sweden	Michelle Coleman (1:00.74); Jennie Johansson (1:05.63); Sarah Sjöström (55.28); Louise Hansson (53.59)	3:55.24	ER
3rd place, bronze medalist(s)	6	Australia	Emily Seebohm (58.81); Taylor McKeown (1:07.38); Emma McKeon (57.59); Bronte Campbell (51.78)	3:55.56	
4	5	United States	Missy Franklin (59.81); Jessica Hardy (1:06.32); Kendyl Stewart (57.24); Simone Manuel (53.39)	3:56.76	
5	2	Denmark	Mie Ø. Nielsen (59.47); Rikke Møller Pedersen (1:07.17); Jeanette Ottesen (56.50); Pernille Blume (54.47)	3:57.61	
6	7	Canada	Dominique Bouchard (59.80); Rachel Nicol (1:07.00); Katerine Savard (57.28); Sandrine Mainville (53.88)	3:57.96	
	1	Great Britain	Lauren Quigley (59.84); Siobhan-Marie O'Connor; Rachael Kelly; Francesca Halsall		DSQ
	8	Japan	Sayaka Akase (1:00.88); Kanako Watanabe; Natsumi Hoshi; Miki Uchida		DSQ
