= 2012 FINA World Swimming Championships (25 m) – Women's 4 × 200 metre freestyle relay =

Women's 4 × 200 m Freestyle Relay at the 2012 Short Course Worlds
- Dates: 12 December (heats and final)
- Winning time: 7:39.25

Medalists
gold medal	United States; Megan Romano, Chelsea Chenault, Shannon Vreeland, Allison Schmitt, Jasmine Tosky*
silver medal	Russia; Veronika Popova, Elena Sokolova, Daria Belyakina, Ksenia Yuskova
bronze medal	China; Qiu Yuhan, Pang Jiaying, Guo Junjun, Tang Yi, Wang Fei*; *Indicates the swimmer only competed in the preliminary heats.

The women's 4 × 200 metre freestyle relay event at the 11th FINA World Swimming Championships (25m) took place 12 December 2012 at the Sinan Erdem Dome.

== Records ==
Prior to this competition, the existing world and championship records were as follows.

	Nation	Swimmers	Time	Location	Date
World record Championship record	China	Chen Qian (1:54.73); Tang Yi (1:53.54); Liu Jing (1:53.59); Zhu Qianwei (1:54.08)	7:35.94	Dubai	15 December 2010

No new records were set during this competition.

== Results ==
=== Heats ===
12 teams participated in 2 heats.

Rank	Heat	Lane	Nation	Swimmers	Time	Notes
1	2	4	United States	Jasmine Tosky (1:58.10); Shannon Vreeland (1:55.75); Chelsea Chenault (1:54.73); Allison Schmitt (1:56.78)	7:45.36	Q
2	2	5	Russia	Daria Belyakina (1:57.67); Ksenia Yuskova (1:57.64); Elena Sokolova (1:55.87); Veronika Popova (1:56.34)	7:47.52	Q, NR
3	1	7	Italy	Alice Mizzau (1:58.99); Diletta Carli (1:57.85); Federica Pellegrini (1:54.75); Alice Nesti (1:56.36)	7:47.95	Q
4	1	6	China	Qiu Yuhan (1:57.03); Wang Fei (1:58.40); Guo Junjun (1:56.13); Pang Jiaying (1:56.72)	7:48.28	Q
5	1	4	Japan	Haruka Ueda (1:56.21); Miki Uchida (1:58.37); Asami Chida (1:57.90); Emu Higuchi (1:58.33)	7:50.81	Q
6	2	2	Denmark	Pernille Blume (1:58.47); Mie Nielsen (1:55.58); Katrine Holm Sørensen (2:00.09); Lotte Friis (1:57.19)	7:51.33	Q, NR
7	1	2	Great Britain	Sophie Allen (1:58.24); Ellie Faulkner (1:59.95); Jazmin Carlin (1:56.91); Rebecca Turner (1:56.74)	7:51.84	Q
8	2	7	Hungary	Eszter Dara (1:59.65); Evelyn Verrasztó (1:56.32); Zsuzsanna Jakabos (1:59.70); Katinka Hosszú (1:57.46)	7:53.13	Q
9	1	3	South Africa	Karin Prinsloo (1:58.41); Michelle Weber (2:02.84); Kyna Pereira (2:00.99); Jessica Pengelly (2:00.25)	8:02.49	AF
10	2	6	Canada	Katerine Savard (1:58.79); Chantal van Landeghem (2:03.34); Noemie It-Ting Thomas (2:04.42); Heather MacLean (1:57.91)	7:58.74	
11	1	5	Peru	Daniela Miyahara (2:05.78); Andrea Cedrón (2:07.91); Erika García-Naranjo (2:10.25); Oriele Espinoza (2:07.94)	8:31.88	NR
12	2	3	Macau	Vong Erica Man Wai (2:00.33); Lei On Kei (2:03.15); Kuan Weng I (1:57.84); Tan Chi Yan (2:00.98)	8:02.30	NR
	2	1	Venezuela		DNS	

=== Final ===
The final was held at 20:41.

Rank	Lane	Nation	Swimmers	Time	Notes
1st place, gold medalist(s)	4	United States	Megan Romano (1:56.03); Chelsea Chenault (1:54.78); Shannon Vreeland (1:55.43); Allison Schmitt (1:53.01)	7:39.25	
2nd place, silver medalist(s)	5	Russia	Veronika Popova (1:55.36); Elena Sokolova (1:55.61); Daria Belyakina (1:55.73); Ksenia Yuskova (1:56.07)	7:42.77	NR
3rd place, bronze medalist(s)	6	China	Qiu Yuhan (1:57.30); Pang Jiaying (1:56.72); Guo Junjun (1:55.91); Tang Yi (1:53.33)	7:43.26	
4	8	Hungary	Evelyn Verrasztó (1:56.96); Eszter Dara (1:58.60); Zsuzsanna Jakabos (1:54.48); Katinka Hosszú (1:54.66)	7:44.70	NR
5	1	Great Britain	Rebecca Turner (1:56.57); Sophie Allen (1:58.14); Jazmin Carlin (1:56.40); Hannah Miley (1:54.74)	7:45.85	
6	3	Italy	Alice Mizzau (1:57.23); Alice Nesti (1:56.76); Diletta Carli (1:57.71); Federica Pellegrini (1:54.31)	7:46.01	NR
7	7	Denmark	Lotte Friis (1:55.93); Pernille Blume (1:56.81); Katrine Holm Sørensen (2:00.57); Mie Nielsen (1:53.73)	7:47.04	NR
8	2	Japan	Haruka Ueda (1:56.38); Miki Uchida (1:58.35); Asami Chida (1:58.00); Emu Higuchi (1:59.23)	7:51.96	
