= 2014 FINA World Swimming Championships (25 m) – Women's 4 × 200 metre freestyle relay =

Women's 4 × 200 metre freestyle relay at the 2014 FINA World Swimming Championships (25 m)
- Dates: 3 December
- Competitors: 56 from 14 nations
- Winning time: 7:32.85

Medalists
gold medal	Inge Dekker; Femke Heemskerk; Ranomi Kromowidjojo; Sharon van Rouwendaal	Netherlands
silver medal	Qiu Yuhan; Cao Yue; Guo Junjun; Shen Duo	China
bronze medal	Leah Neale; Madison Wilson; Brianna Throssell; Kylie Palmer	Australia

The Women's 4 × 200 metre freestyle relay competition of the 2014 FINA World Swimming Championships (25 m) was held on 3 December.

== Records ==
Prior to the competition, the existing world and championship records were as follows.

	Nation	Time	Location	Date
World record Championship record	China	7:35.94	Dubai	15 December 2010

The following records were established during the competition:

Date	Event	Nation	Time	Record
3 December	Final	Netherlands	7:32.85	WR

== Results ==
=== Heats ===
The heats were held at 12:52.

Rank	Heat	Lane	Nation	Swimmers	Time	Notes
1	2	8	Netherlands	Inge Dekker (1:54.80); Esmee Vermeulen (1:55.56); Sharon van Rouwendaal (1:54.14); Femke Heemskerk (1:54.70)	7:39.20	Q
2	1	5	Sweden	Louise Hansson (1:56.18); Michelle Coleman (1:54.98); Ida Marko-Varga (1:58.76); Sarah Sjöström (1:53.95)	7:43.87	Q
3	2	5	China	Qiu Yuhan (1:53.45); Cao Yue (1:57.15); Guo Junjun (1:57.76); Shen Duo (1:56.06)	7:44.42	Q
4	1	4	United States	Shannon Vreeland (1:54.78); Emily Allen (1:58.30); Katie Drabot (1:55.49); Madisyn Cox (1:56.24)	7:44.81	Q
5	1	7	Australia	Leah Neale (1:54.58); Kylie Palmer (1:54.86); Brianna Throssell (1:57.05); Katie Goldman (1:58.69)	7:45.18	Q
6	2	7	Russia	Arina Openysheva (1:57.22); Viktoriya Andreyeva (1:56.98); Veronika Popova (1:53.12); Elena Sokolova (1:58.19)	7:45.51	Q
7	2	4	Japan	Chihiro Igarashi (1:55.87); Tomomi Aoki (1:56.48); Miki Uchida (1:54.85); Yayoi Matsumoto (1:58.77)	7:45.97	Q
8	2	6	Hungary	Evelyn Verrasztó (1:54.64); Boglárka Kapás (1:57.87); Fanni Gyurinovics (1:58.34); Zsuzsanna Jakabos (1:55.36)	7:46.21	Q
9	2	3	Italy	Chiara Luccetti (1:55.93); Alice Mizzau (1:56.38); Diletta Carli (1:59.21); Stefania Pirozzi (1:56.09)	7:47.61	
10	1	2	Germany	Daniela Schreiber (1:56.68); Marlene Hüther (1:57.94); Annika Bruhn (1:57.28); Silke Lippok (1:56.95)	7:48.85	
11	1	3	Austria	Lisa Zaiser (1:56.54); Jördis Steinegger (1:57.86); Lena Kreundl (2:00.64); Claudia Hufnagl (1:59.66)	7:54.70	
12	2	1	Turkey	Esra Kübra Kaçmaz (2:00.83); Tuana Ayça Bahtoğlu (2:05.75); Defne Kurt (2:10.55); İlknur Nihan Çakıcı (2:08.03)	8:25.16	
13	1	1	India	Malavika Vishwanath (2:06.69); Aditi Dhumatkar (2:08.83); Thalasha Satish Prabhu (2:12.32); Anusha Sanjeev Mehta (2:11.77)	8:39.61	
14	1	6	Macau	Tan Chi Yan (2:08.86); Long Chi Wai (2:11.87); Lei On Kei (2:09.74); Choi Weng Tong (2:12.00)	8:42.47	
—	2	2	Brazil		DNS	

=== Final ===
The final was held at 19:32.

Rank	Lane	Nation	Swimmers	Time	Notes
1st place, gold medalist(s)	3	Netherlands	Inge Dekker (1:54.73); Femke Heemskerk (1:51.22); Ranomi Kromowidjojo (1:54.17); Sharon van Rouwendaal (1:52.73)	7:32.85	WR
2nd place, silver medalist(s)	2	China	Qiu Yuhan (1:53.26); Cao Yue (1:54.48); Guo Junjun (1:55.14); Shen Duo (1:54.14)	7:37.02	
3rd place, bronze medalist(s)	6	Australia	Leah Neale (1:54.15); Madison Wilson (1:54.37); Brianna Throssell (1:56.80); Kylie Palmer (1:53.27)	7:38.59	
4	4	Hungary	Evelyn Verrasztó (1:54.65); Zsuzsanna Jakabos (1:54.85); Boglárka Kapás (1:56.58); Katinka Hosszú (1:53.13)	7:39.21	
5	7	United States	Shannon Vreeland (1:55.22); Kathleen Baker (1:54.22); Katie Drabot (1:54.74); Elizabeth Beisel (1:55.30)	7:39.48	
6	8	Japan	Miki Uchida (1:54.60); Chihiro Igarashi (1:54.15); Tomomi Aoki (1:56.68); Yayoi Matsumoto (1:57.22)	7:42.65	
7	1	Sweden	Michelle Coleman (1:54.57); Louise Hansson (1:54.58); Ida Marko-Varga (1:59.15); Sarah Sjöström (1:55.14)	7:43.44	
8	5	Russia	Veronika Popova (1:54.09); Arina Openysheva (1:57.20); Elena Sokolova (1:56.13); Viktoriya Andreyeva (1:56.62)	7:44.04	
