= Brianna Throssell =

Australian swimmer (born 1996)

Brianna Throssell OAM
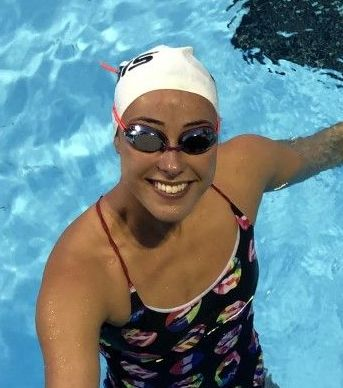

Personal information
- Nationality: Australian
- Born: 10 February 1996 (age 30) Subiaco, Western Australia, Australia
- Education: The University of Notre Dame Australia
- Height: 1.75 m (5 ft 9 in)
- Weight: 61 kg (134 lb)

Sport
- Sport: Swimming
- Strokes: Freestyle
- Club: UWA West Coast, St Peters Western
- Coach: Michael Palfrey, Dean Boxall
Medal record
Women's swimming
Representing Australia
Event	1st	2nd	3rd
Olympic Games	2	0	2
World Championships (LC)	6	9	3
World Championships (SC)	0	2	1
Commonwealth Games	1	0	3
Total	9	11	9
Olympic Games
Gold medal – first place	2020 Tokyo	4×100 m medley
Gold medal – first place	2024 Paris	4×200 m freestyle
Bronze medal – third place	2020 Tokyo	4×200 m freestyle
Bronze medal – third place	2020 Tokyo	4×100 m mixed medley
World Championships (LC)
Gold medal – first place	2019 Gwangju	4×100 m freestyle
Gold medal – first place	2019 Gwangju	4×200 m freestyle
Gold medal – first place	2022 Budapest	4×100 m freestyle
Gold medal – first place	2023 Fukuoka	4×100 m freestyle
Gold medal – first place	2023 Fukuoka	4×200 m freestyle
Gold medal – first place	2024 Doha	4×100 m medley
Silver medal – second place	2019 Gwangju	4×100 m medley
Silver medal – second place	2019 Gwangju	4×100 m mixed freestyle
Silver medal – second place	2022 Budapest	4×200 m freestyle
Silver medal – second place	2022 Budapest	4×100 m medley
Silver medal – second place	2022 Budapest	4×100 m mixed medley
Silver medal – second place	2023 Fukuoka	4×100 m medley
Silver medal – second place	2024 Doha	4×100 m freestyle
Silver medal – second place	2024 Doha	4×100 m mixed freestyle
Silver medal – second place	2024 Doha	4×100 m mixed medley
Bronze medal – third place	2017 Budapest	4×100 m medley
Bronze medal – third place	2024 Doha	200 m freestyle
Bronze medal – third place	2024 Doha	4×200 m freestyle
World Championships (SC)
Silver medal – second place	2012 Istanbul	4x100 m freestyle
Silver medal – second place	2012 Istanbul	4x100 m medley
Bronze medal – third place	2014 Doha	4x200 m freestyle
Commonwealth Games
Gold medal – first place	2018 Gold Coast	4x200 m freestyle
Bronze medal – third place	2018 Gold Coast	100 m butterfly
Bronze medal – third place	2022 Birmingham	100 m butterfly
Bronze medal – third place	2022 Birmingham	200 m butterfly
Oceania Championships
Gold medal – first place	2014 Auckland	50 m butterfly
Gold medal – first place	2014 Auckland	100 m butterfly
Gold medal – first place	2014 Auckland	4×100 m freestyle
Silver medal – second place	2014 Auckland	50 m freestyle
Silver medal – second place	2014 Auckland	4×50 m mixed medley
Silver medal – second place	2014 Auckland	4×100 m mixed medley
Bronze medal – third place	2014 Auckland	4×100 m medley
Summer Youth Olympics
Bronze medal – third place	2014 Nanjing	200 m freestyle
Bronze medal – third place	2014 Nanjing	100 m butterfly
Bronze medal – third place	2014 Nanjing	200 m butterfly
Bronze medal – third place	2014 Nanjing	4×100 m freestyle
Bronze medal – third place	2014 Nanjing	4×100 m medley
Bronze medal – third place	2014 Nanjing	4×100 m mixed freestyle
Bronze medal – third place	2014 Nanjing	4×100 m mixed medley
Junior Pan Pacific Championships
Silver medal – second place	2012 Honolulu	200 m freestyle
Silver medal – second place	2012 Honolulu	100 m butterfly
Silver medal – second place	2012 Honolulu	4×100 m freestyle
Silver medal – second place	2012 Honolulu	4×200 m freestyle

Brianna Throssell OAM (born 10 February 1996) is a former Australian professional swimmer who previously represented DC Trident at the International Swimming League.

Throssell competed in the 2014 Summer Youth Olympics, where she won seven bronze medals. She represented her country at the 2016 Summer Olympics in Rio de Janeiro where she finished third in the semi-finals with a time of 2:07:19 behind Zhou Yilin and Zhang Yufei. She qualified for the final and finished last with a time of 2:07:87.

Throssell again represented Australia at the 2020 Summer Olympics, held in Tokyo in 2021, where she swam in the 100m and 200m butterfly events, coming in 8th place in the final of the 200m event. She won a gold medal in the Women's 4 x 100 metre medley relay and a bronze medal in the Mixed 4 x 100 metre medley relay after swimming the butterfly leg in the heats for both events. She also won a bronze medal in the Women's 4 x 200 metre freestyle relay after swimming in the heats of that event.

In the 2022 Australia Day Honours Throssell was awarded the Medal of the Order of Australia.

== World records ==
=== Long course metres ===
No.	Event	Time	Meet	Location	Date	Status	Ref
1	4x200 m freestyle relay^{[a]}	7:41.50	2019 World Aquatic Championships	Gwangju, South Korea	25 July 2019	Former	
2	4x200 m freestyle relay^{[b]}	7:37.50	2023 World Aquatics Championships	Fukuoka, Japan	27 July 2023	Current	

^{a} split 1:55.60 (3rd leg); with Ariarne Titmus (1st leg), Madison Wilson (2nd leg), Emma McKeon (4th leg)
^{b} split 1:55.80 (3rd leg); with Mollie O'Callaghan (1st leg), Shayna Jack (2nd leg), Ariarne Titmus (4th leg)

== Olympic records ==
=== Long course metres ===
No.	Event	Time	Meet	Location	Date	Status	Notes	Ref
1	4x200 m freestyle relay^{[a]}	7:38.08	2024 Summer Olympics	Paris, France	1 August 2024	Current		

Legend: WR – World record; OC – Oceanian record; NR – Australian record;
Records not set in finals: h – heat; sf – semifinal; r – relay 1st leg; rh – relay heat 1st leg; b – B final; † – en route to final mark; so – swim-off; tt – time trial

^{a} split 1:56.00 (3rd leg) with Mollie O'Callaghan (1st leg), Lani Pallister (2nd leg), Ariarne Titmus (4th leg)
