= Madeline Groves =

Australian swimmer (born 1995)

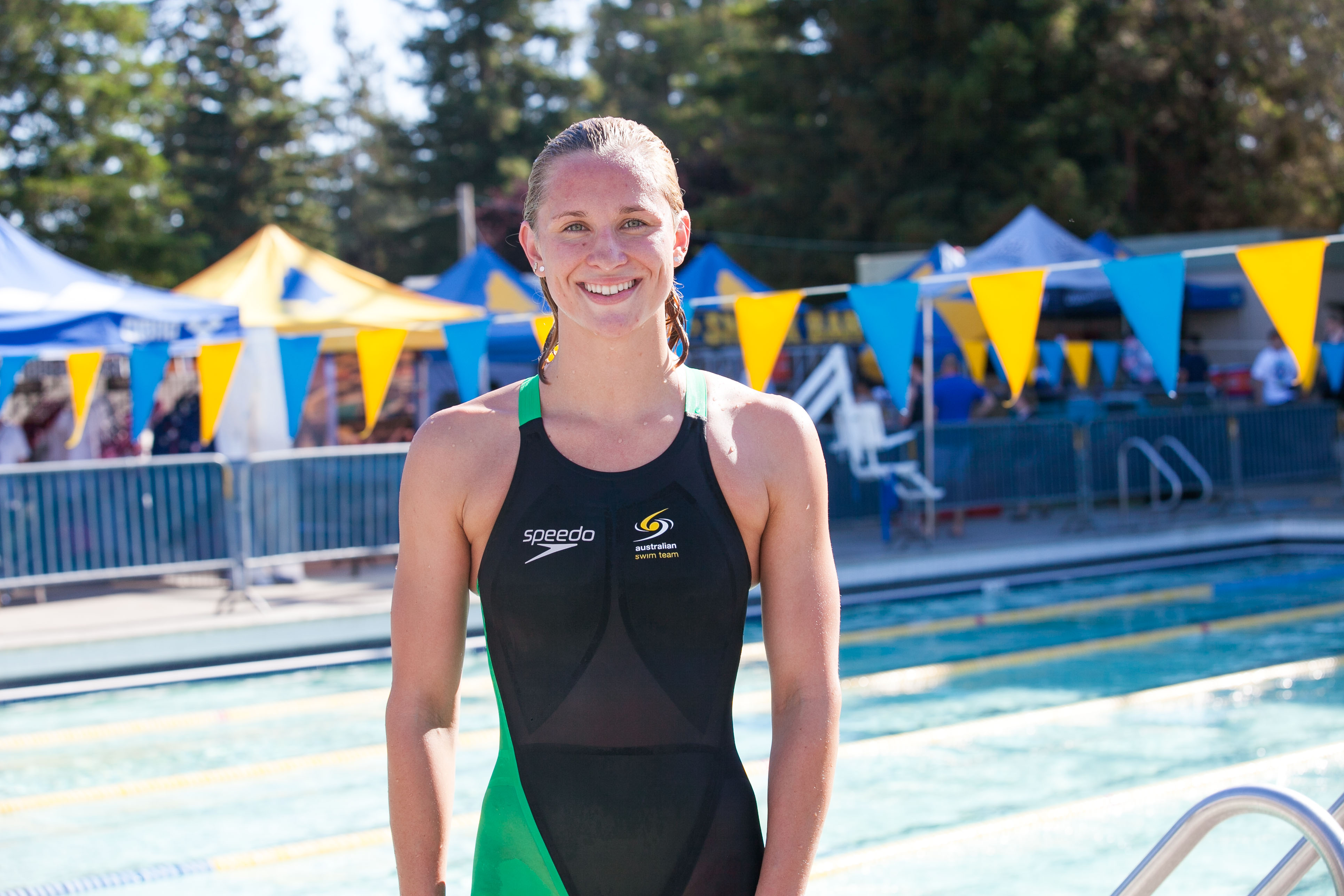
- Madeline Groves after winning 200m butterfly in June 2016.

Personal information
- Nickname: Mad Dog
- Born: 25 May 1995 (age 31) Brisbane
- Weight: 66 kg (146 lb)

Sport
- Sport: Swimming
- Strokes: Butterfly
- Coach: Michael Bohl
Medal record
Olympic Games
Silver medal – second place	2016 Rio de Janeiro	200 m butterfly
Silver medal – second place	2016 Rio de Janeiro	4×100 m medley
World Championships (LC)
Bronze medal – third place	2015 Kazan	4×100 m medley
Pan Pacific Championships
Gold medal – first place	2018 Tokyo	4×200 m freestyle
Commonwealth Games
Gold medal – first place	2014 Glasgow	4×100 m freestyle
Gold medal – first place	2014 Glasgow	4×200 m freestyle
Silver medal – second place	2018 Gold Coast	100 m butterfly
Bronze medal – third place	2014 Glasgow	200 m butterfly

Madeline Groves (born 25 May 1995) is an Australian competitive swimmer. She was the Australian national champion in the 200 m butterfly event in 2013, 2014, 2015 and 2016. At the 2014 Commonwealth Games she was a bronze medallist in the 200 m butterfly event, and swam in the heats for the gold medal-winning Australian freestyle relay team. She was selected to represent Australia in the 100 m and 200 m butterfly, and 4 × 200 m freestyle relay events at the 2016 Summer Olympics in Rio de Janeiro.

== Biography ==
Madeline Groves was born in Brisbane, Queensland, on 25 May 1995. She has two brothers. She attended Wilston State Primary School and St Peters Lutheran College. In 2014, she was an inaugural recipient of the Georgina Hope Rinehart Swimming Excellence Scholarship to study for a Bachelor of Social Science degree at Bond University on Queensland's Gold Coast.

Groves learned to swim when she was a baby, and started competitive swimming when she was twelve years old. As a junior, she won the 100 m and 200 m butterfly and 4 × 100 m medley events, and silver in the 50 m butterfly, at the 2010 Oceania Swimming Championships in Samoa. At the Junior Pan Pacific championships in Hawaii that year she came second in the 200 m butterfly and fifth in the 100 m butterfly events. She took 2011 off, but returned to competitive swimming after she finished high school. She is coached by Michael Bohl at St Peter's Western, where Mitch Larkin, Bronte Barratt, Madison Wilson and Grant Irvine also train. She has known Bohl since 2008, and he has been her coach since 2012. She has been nicknamed "Mad Dog" and "Machine Gun".

In 2013, Groves became the national champion at the 2013 Australian Swimming Championships in the 200 m butterfly event. During 2014, Groves suffered from debilitating pain in her shoulder and neck. This was traced to a clenched jaw, which has been treated by an orthodontist. She defended her national title in the 200 m butterfly event at the 2014 Australian Swimming Championships, and the 2015 Australian Swimming Championships, and in Adelaide in April 2016 at the 2016 Australian Swimming Championships, where she was second in the 100 m butterfly.

At the 2014 Commonwealth Games she was a bronze medallist in the 200 m butterfly event, and swam in the heats for the gold medal-winning Australian freestyle relay team. At the 2015 World Aquatics Championships in Kazan, Russia, she was 9th in the 200m butterfly and 11th in the 100 m butterfly events. She swam in the heats of the medley relay, in which the Australian team went on to win.

In April 2016, Groves was selected to represent Australia in the 100 m and 200 m butterfly, and 4 × 200 m freestyle relay events at the 2016 Summer Olympics in Rio de Janeiro. This was her first Olympics. She did not qualify for the semi-final in the 100 m butterfly, but qualified fastest for the final of the 200 m butterfly. She won silver, finishing just three-hundredths of a second behind Spain's Mireia Belmonte.

In June 2021, she announced she was withdrawing from the Australian trials for the 2020 Summer Olympics in protest over "misogynistic perverts in sport and their bootlickers," stating that her decision was "the culmination of years of witnessing and 'benefitting' from a culture that relies on people ignoring bad behaviour to thrive." In December 2020, she had made a post on social media revealing that she had made a complaint to Swimming Australia after a coach made an inappropriate comment towards her.

== See also ==
- List of Olympic medalists in swimming (women)
- List of World Aquatics Championships medalists in swimming (women)
- List of Commonwealth Games medallists in swimming (women)
