= Cao Yue =

Chinese swimmer (born 1995)

Personal information
- Native name: 曹 玥
- Nationality: Chinese
- Born: 29 October 1995 (age 30)

Sport
- Sport: Swimming
Medal record
Asian Games
Gold medal – first place	2014 Incheon	4×200 m freestyle
World Championships (SC)
Silver medal – second place	2014 Doha	4×200 m freestyle

Cao Yue (Chinese: 曹 玥, born 29 October 1995) is a Chinese swimmer. She competed in the women's 400 metre freestyle event at the 2016 Summer Olympics.
