= Guo Junjun =

Chinese swimmer (born 1991)

Personal information
- Native name: 郭君君
- Nationality: Chinese
- Born: 2 January 1991 (age 35) Dalian, Liaoning, China
- Height: 1.73 m (5 ft 8 in)
- Weight: 62 kg (137 lb)

Sport
- Country: China
- Sport: female swimmer
Medal record
World Championships (LC)
Bronze medal – third place	2015 Kazan	4×200 m freestyle
World Championships (SC)
Gold medal – first place	2012 Istanbul	4×200 m freestyle
Silver medal – second place	2014 Doha	4×200 m freestyle
Asian Games
Gold medal – first place	2014 Incheon	4×200 m freestyle
Asian Championships
Gold medal – first place	2009 Foshan	4×200 m freestyle

Guo Junjun (Chinese: 郭君君; pinyin: Guō Jūn Jūn; born 2 January 1991 in Dalian, Liaoning) is a Chinese female swimmer. At the 2014 Asian Games in Incheon, South Korea, Guo'group of four people won the Champion in the 4 × 200 m freestyle relay event in time of 7:55.17 in the final, 1:58.09 by herself. she is also the silver goldlist for 4 × 200 m title at 2015 World Championships in Kazan, Russia.
