= Amelia Maughan =

British swimmer (born 1996)

Personal information
- Nationality: British
- Born: 16 May 1996 (age 30) Hammersmith, England
- Height: 178 cm (5 ft 10 in)

Sport
- Sport: Swimming
- Strokes: Front crawl
- Club: Millfield, England; University of Florida, USA
Medal record
Women's swimming
Representing Great Britain
Youth Olympic Games
Silver medal – second place	2014 Nanjing	4×100 m medley relay
Representing England
Commonwealth Games
Silver medal – second place	2014 Glasgow	4x100 m freestyle relay
Bronze medal – third place	2014 Glasgow	4x200 m freestyle relay

Amelia Maughan (born 16 May 1996) is a British swimmer and double Commonwealth Games medallist. She competed for England at the 2014 Commonwealth Games in the 4×100m freestyle relay and 4×200m freestyle relay and won a silver and bronze medal, respectively.

Maughan competed for Great Britain at 2014 Summer Youth Olympics, earning a silver medal in the 4×100m medley relay and also swimming in 50m freestyle, 100m freestyle, 200m freestyle, and 4×100m freestyle mixed relay.
