= Swimming at the 2014 Commonwealth Games – Women's 200 metre butterfly =

Women's 200 metre butterfly at the 2014 Commonwealth Games
- Venue: Tollcross International Swimming Centre
- Dates: 28 July 2014
- Competitors: 24 from 15 nations
- Winning time: 2:07.61

Medalists
gold medal	Audrey Lacroix	Canada
silver medal	Aimee Willmott	England
bronze medal	Madeline Groves	Australia

The women's 200 metre butterfly event at the 2014 Commonwealth Games as part of the swimming programme took place on 28 July at the Tollcross International Swimming Centre in Glasgow, Scotland.

The medals were presented by Takitoa Taumoepeau, Secretary General of the Tonga Sports Association and National Olympic Committee and the quaichs were presented by Annette Knott, Secretary General of the Trinidad and Tobago Olympic Committee.

== Records ==
Prior to this competition, the existing world and Commonwealth Games records were as follows.

World record	Liu Zige (CHN)	2:01.81	Jinan, China	21 October 2009
Commonwealth record	Jessicah Schipper (AUS)	2:03.41	Rome, Italy	30 July 2009
Games record	Jessicah Schipper (AUS)	2:06.09	Melbourne, Australia	21 March 2006

== Results ==
=== Heats ===
Rank	Heat	Lane	Name	Nationality	Time	Notes
1	3	4	Madeline Groves	Australia	2:08.51	Q
2	1	5	Jemma Lowe	Wales	2:09.28	Q
3	3	5	Audrey Lacroix	Canada	2:09.58	Q
4	2	5	Aimee Willmott	England	2:09.60	Q
5	2	4	Ellen Gandy	Australia	2:09.96	Q
6	1	3	Alys Thomas	Wales	2:11.03	Q
7	3	6	Hannah Miley	Scotland	2:11.06	Q
8	1	4	Katerine Savard	Canada	2:11.31	Q
9	2	6	Alanna Bowles	Australia	2:12.31	
10	2	3	Elena Sheridan	England	2:12.39	
11	3	2	Samantha Lee	New Zealand	2:13.63	
12	3	3	Tilly Gray	England	2:14.68	
13	1	6	Rene Warnes	South Africa	2:14.85	
14	1	1	Sycerika McMahon	Northern Ireland	2:15.53	
15	2	2	Emily Overholt	Canada	2:15.83	
16	1	2	Charlotte Atkinson	Isle of Man	2:16.64	
17	3	1	Gemma Kane	Northern Ireland	2:18.39	
18	1	7	Trudiann Patrick	Jamaica	2:21.28	
19	2	7	Lynette Lim	Singapore	2:21.45	
20	3	8	Lara Butler	Cayman Islands	2:22.53	
21	2	1	Yap Siew Hui	Malaysia	2:22.55	
22	2	8	Jannah Sonnenschein	Mozambique	2:24.33	
23	1	8	Tieri Erasito	Fiji	2:28.08	
	3	7	Quah Ting Wen	Singapore		DSQ

=== Finals ===
Rank	Lane	Name	Nationality	Time	Notes
1st place, gold medalist(s)	3	Audrey Lacroix	Canada	2:07.61	
2nd place, silver medalist(s)	6	Aimee Willmott	England	2:08.07	
3rd place, bronze medalist(s)	4	Madeline Groves	Australia	2:08.44	
4	7	Alys Thomas	Wales	2:08.62	
5	5	Jemma Lowe	Wales	2:08.69	
6	1	Hannah Miley	Scotland	2:09.32	
7	2	Ellen Gandy	Australia	2:09.51	
8	8	Katerine Savard	Canada	2:12.81	
