= Jessica Fullalove =

British swimmer

Personal information
- Full name: Jessica Fullalove
- Nickname: Jess
- Nationality: British
- Born: 27 July 1996 (age 30) Oldham, England
- Height: 5 ft 6 in (168 cm)
- Weight: 135 lb (61 kg)

Sport
- Sport: Swimming
- Strokes: Backstroke
- Club: City Of Manchester Aquatics
Medal record
Women's swimming
Representing Great Britain
Youth Olympic Games
| Silver medal – second place | 2014 Nanjing | 50 m backstroke |
| Silver medal – second place | 2014 Nanjing | 100 m backstroke |
| Silver medal – second place | 2014 Nanjing | 4×100 m medley |
World Junior Championships
| Silver medal – second place | 2013 Dubai | 4×100 m medley |
| Bronze medal – third place | 2013 Dubai | 100 m backstroke |
European Junior Championships
| Gold medal – first place | 2011 Belgrade | 4x100 m medley |
| Silver medal – second place | 2011 Belgrade | 100 m backstroke |
| Silver medal – second place | 2012 Antwerp | 100 m backstroke |
| Silver medal – second place | 2012 Antwerp | 4x100 m medley |
| Bronze medal – third place | 2012 Antwerp | 50 m backstroke |

Jessica Fullalove (born 27 July 1996 in Oldham, England) is a British backstroke swimmer.

Fullalove competed at the 2013 FINA World Junior Swimming Championships in Dubai, United Arab Emirates, and at the 2014 Commonwealth Games in Glasgow, Scotland. She was a part of the team for the 2014 Summer Youth Olympics in Nanjing, China, in August. also competed at the commonwealth games in Glasgow, 2014.

Fullalove swims with the City Of Manchester Aquatics and resides in Manchester.
