= Shen Duo =

Chinese swimmer (born 1997)

Personal information
- National team: China
- Born: 9 June 1997 (age 29) Liyang, China
- Height: 1.81 m (5 ft 11 in)
- Weight: 72 kg (159 lb)

Sport
- Sport: Swimming
- Strokes: Freestyle
- Club: Jiangsu Swimming Team
Medal record
Women's swimming
Representing China
World Championships (LC)
Gold medal – first place	2015 Kazan	4×100 m medley
Silver medal – second place	2017 Budapest	4×200 m freestyle
Bronze medal – third place	2015 Kazan	4×200 m freestyle
World Championships (SC)
Silver medal – second place	2014 Doha	4×200 m freestyle
Asian Games
Gold medal – first place	2014 Incheon	100 m freestyle
Gold medal – first place	2014 Incheon	200 m freestyle
Gold medal – first place	2014 Incheon	4×100 m freestyle
Gold medal – first place	2014 Incheon	4×200 m freestyle
Gold medal – first place	2018 Jakarta	4×200 m freestyle
Summer Youth Olympics
Gold medal – first place	2014 Nanjing	100 m freestyle
Gold medal – first place	2014 Nanjing	200 m freestyle
Gold medal – first place	2014 Nanjing	4×100 m freestyle
Gold medal – first place	2014 Nanjing	4×100 m medley

Shen Duo (Chinese: 沈铎; pinyin: Shēn Duō; born 9 June 1997) is a Chinese competitive swimmer who specializes in sprint freestyle events. Considered one of the most promising swimmers in the international scene, she currently holds three world junior records each in the 100 m freestyle, the 400 m medley relay, and the mixed 400 m freestyle relay, and also pocketed a total of nine gold medals to her career hardware in two major meets at the peak of 2014 season.

== Career ==
As a 13 year old, Shen was promoted to the Jiangsu Provincial Swim Team by then Head Coach Ron Turner, who developed her into one of China's top youth swimmers. When China hosted the 2014 Summer Youth Olympics in her home city Nanjing, Shen won five gold medals and broke three world junior records in swimming. Shen helped the Chinese foursome scorch the final field of swimmers with two astonishing world junior records each in the mixed 4×100 m freestyle (3:27.02) and in the girls' 4×100 m medley (4:03.58). Two days later, she continued to smash another world record with a time of 53.84 in the 100 m freestyle, vaulting her up to thirteenth in the world rankings. On August 20, Shen picked up her fourth gold of the meet in the 200 m freestyle, finishing a personal best in 1:56.12. In the girls' 4×100 m freestyle relay, Shen demolished the field with a phenomenal 53.59 split to run away with another relay victory for her host nation's foursome in 3:41.19.

One month later, at the 2014 Asian Games in Incheon, South Korea, Shen added four more golds to her career tally in her respective events, most notably in both freestyle relay and sprint. On the first day of the competition, Shen posted a 53.58 split on the second leg to put the Chinese squad ahead to a marvelous victory in the women's 4×100 m freestyle relay, with a time of 3:37.25. In the women's 100 m freestyle, Shen held off her hard-charging teammate and 2012 Olympic bronze medalist Tang Yi by 0.08 of a second to take the gold medal in 54.37. Shen continued to dominate the medal tally on her third night, as she threw down an anchor-leg split in 2:00.60 to deliver the Chinese foursome another relay victory in 7:55.17. In the women's 200 m freestyle, Shen pulled ahead from the rest of the field to pick up her fourth straight gold of the meet in 1:57.66.

For her outstanding successes at the Summer Youth Olympics and a six-gold medal streak in swimming, Shen has been nominated for the Breakthrough of the Year Award in the upcoming 2015 Laureus World Sports Awards in Shanghai.

At the 2015 FINA World Championships in Kazan, Russia, Shen helped the Chinese squad secured a bronze medal in the 4×200 m freestyle with a combined time of 7:49.10, and then pulled off a lead on the freestyle anchor leg (53.00) to deliver the solid foursome of Fu Yuanhui, Shi Jinglin, and Lu Ying a blazing fast finish in 3:54.41 to claim the gold in the 4×100 m medley relay, just over two seconds away of the current meet record set by her team in 2009.

== Personal bests (long course) ==
As of September 30, 2014

Event	Time	Meet	Date	Note(s)
100 m freestyle	53.84	2014 Summer Youth Olympics	August 18, 2014	
200 m freestyle	1.56.12	2014 Summer Youth Olympics	August 20, 2014	

== Controversy ==
2018 Asian Games - The Korean Sport & Olympic Committee (KSOC) has officially requested the Olympic Council of Asia (OCA) for an investigation, claiming that Shen Duo had assaulted a Korean swimmer on the 23rd of August. According to KSOC's claims, Kim Hye-jin had been swimming in front of Shen Duo when she unintentionally kicked Shen Duo in the chest. Kim had immediately apologized, but Shen Duo followed Kim to the end of the lane, where she pulled Kim underwater by her ankles then kicked her twice in the abdomen.
