= Siobhan-Marie O'Connor =

English swimmer (born 1995)

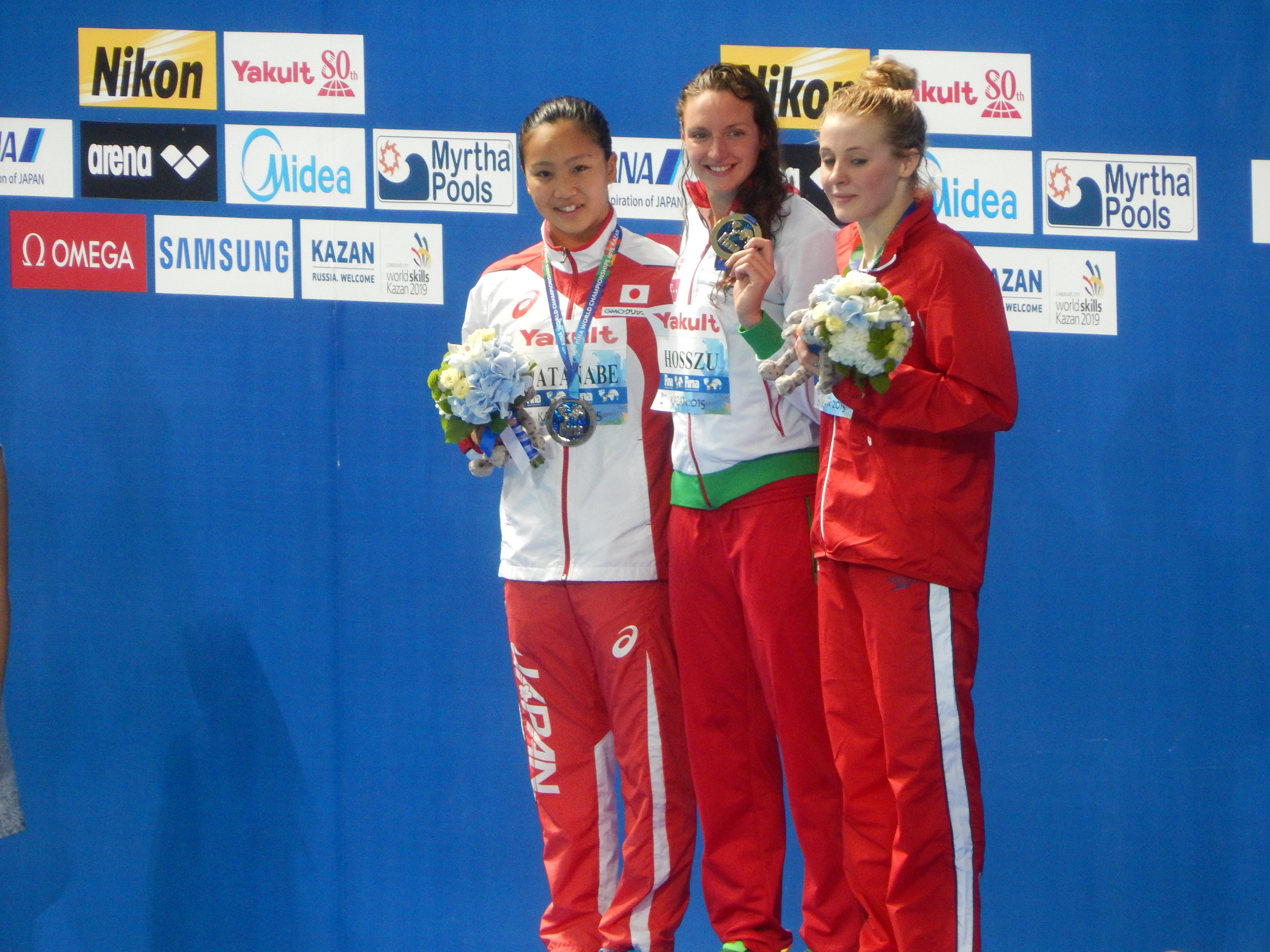
- O'Connor (right) at the 2015 World Aquatics Championships medal ceremony for the 200 m medley

Personal information
- Full name: Siobhan-Marie O'Connor
- Nickname: SOC
- National team: Great Britain
- Born: 29 November 1995 (age 30) Bath, England
- Height: 5 ft 7 in (170 cm)
- Weight: 132 lb (60 kg)

Sport
- Sport: Swimming
- Strokes: Freestyle, butterfly, medley, breaststroke
- Club: Bath National Centre
- Coach: David McNulty
Medal record
Women's swimming
Representing Great Britain
Event	1st	2nd	3rd
Olympic Games	0	1	0
World Championships (LC)	1	0	1
World Championships (SC)	0	3	0
European Championships(LC)	2	1	1
European Championships	0	3	2
Commonwealth Games	2	4	3
Total	5	12	7
Olympic Games
Silver medal – second place	2016 Rio de Janeiro	200 m medley
World Championships (LC)
Gold medal – first place	2015 Kazan	4×100 m mixed medley
Bronze medal – third place	2015 Kazan	200 m medley
World Championships (SC)
Silver medal – second place	2014 Doha	100 m medley
Silver medal – second place	2014 Doha	200 m medley
Silver medal – second place	2014 Doha	4×50 m mixed medley
European Championships (LC)
Gold medal – first place	2016 London	4×100 m medley
Gold medal – first place	2016 London	4×100 m mixed medley
Silver medal – second place	2016 London	200 m medley
Bronze medal – third place	2018 Glasgow	4×100m medley
European Championships (SC)
Silver medal – second place	2013 Herning	200 m medley
Silver medal – second place	2015 Netanya	100 m medley
Silver medal – second place	2015 Netanya	200 m medley
Bronze medal – third place	2019 Glasgow	200 m medley
European Junior Championships
Gold medal – first place	2011 Belgrade	200 m medley
Gold medal – first place	2011 Belgrade	400 m medley
Gold medal – first place	2011 Belgrade	4x100 m medley
Silver medal – second place	2011 Belgrade	4x100 m freestyle
Representing England
Commonwealth Games
Gold medal – first place	2014 Glasgow	200 m medley
Gold medal – first place	2018 Gold Coast	200 m medley
Silver medal – second place	2014 Glasgow	200 m freestyle
Silver medal – second place	2014 Glasgow	100 m butterfly
Silver medal – second place	2014 Glasgow	4×100 m freestyle
Silver medal – second place	2014 Glasgow	4×100 m medley
Bronze medal – third place	2014 Glasgow	4×200 m freestyle
Bronze medal – third place	2018 Gold Coast	4×100 m freestyle
Bronze medal – third place	2018 Gold Coast	4×200 m freestyle

Siobhan-Marie O'Connor (born 29 November 1995) is a former English competitive swimmer who has represented Great Britain at the Olympic Games, the FINA World Aquatics Championships and the LEN European Aquatics Championships, and England at the Commonwealth Games. A specialist in the 200 metres individual medley, she is the 2014 and 2018 Commonwealth Games champion in the event, and has won silver medals in the same event at the 2016 Summer Olympics, the 2015 World Aquatics Championships, 2016 European Aquatics Championships, the 2014 World Short-Course Championships and the 2013 and 2015 European Short Course Championships – on each occasion behind World and Olympic champion Katinka Hosszú. With six Commonwealth Games medals in total from 2014, O'Connor was England's most decorated athlete at those Games.

In addition, O'Connor swam the butterfly leg for Great Britain in the non-Olympic 4 x 100-metre mixed medley relay that won gold at the 2015 FINA World Aquatics Championships in a world record time for the event. she has also won gold medals in 2016 at the European Championships in the same event, and in the women's 4 x 100 metres medley relay.

O'Connor first competed for Great Britain at the 2012 Summer Olympics in the 100m breaststroke event. She holds the British records for 200 metres individual medley, the 100 breaststroke and the 4 x 100-metre mixed medley relay.

O'Connor announced her retirement from competitive swimming on 16 June 2021, following a long battle with ulcerative colitis.

O'Connor became a swimming coach and trained Daisy Ridley for her role in the 2024 movie Young Woman and the Sea.

== Personal life ==
O'Connor attended St. Gregory's Catholic College in Bath. She missed her prom to compete in the qualifying meet for the 2012 London Olympics. In 2015, Siobhan was at a Team Bath warm weather training camp at Northern Arizona University at the same time four students were shot by a freshman following an altercation outside a fraternity house, leaving one dead and three wounded.

O'Connor has ulcerative colitis, a type of inflammatory bowel disease.

== See also ==
- List of Olympic medalists in swimming (women)
- List of World Aquatics Championships medalists in swimming (women)
- List of European Aquatics Championships medalists in swimming (women)
- List of Commonwealth Games medallists in swimming (women)
- List of European Short Course Swimming Championships medalists (women)
