= Elena Sokolova (swimmer) =

Russian swimmer

Personal information
- Native name: Елена Соколова
- Full name: Elena Petrovna Sokolova
- Nationality: Russia
- Born: February 13, 1991 (age 35) Moscow, Soviet Union
- Height: 184 cm (6 ft 0 in)
- Weight: 64 kg (141 lb)

Sport
- Sport: Swimming
- Strokes: Freestyle
- Club: Yunost Moskva
Medal record
Women's swimming
Representing Russia
World Championships (SC)
Silver medal – second place	2012 Istanbul	4×200 m freestyle

Elena Petrovna Sokolova (Russian: Елена Петровна Соколова, born February 13, 1991, in Moscow) is a Russian freestyle swimmer. She competed at the 2008 Summer Olympics in the 800 m freestyle, placing 2nd in her heat and 7th in the final. She was also a member of the Russian 4×100 m freestyle relay, which placed 12th in the heats and did not advance to the final.

Sokolova won the 400m, 800m and 1,500m freestyle events in the 2007 European Junior Swimming Championships.
