= Qiu Yuhan =

Chinese swimmer (born 1998)

Personal information
- Full name: Qiu Yuhan
- National team: China
- Born: July 17, 1998 (age 27) Liaoning, China
- Height: 1.77 m (5 ft 10 in)

Sport
- Sport: Swimming
- Strokes: Freestyle
Medal record
Women's swimming
Representing China
World Championships (LC)
Gold medal – first place	2015 Kazan	4×100 m medley
Bronze medal – third place	2015 Kazan	4×200 m freestyle
World Championships (SC)
Silver medal – second place	2014 Doha	4×200 m freestyle
Bronze medal – third place	2012 Istanbul	4×200 m freestyle
Youth Olympic Games
Gold medal – first place	2014 Nanjing	4×100 m freestyle
Gold medal – first place	2014 Nanjing	4×100 m medley
Gold medal – first place	2014 Nanjing	4×100 m mixed free
Silver medal – second place	2014 Nanjing	200 m freestyle
Bronze medal – third place	2014 Nanjing	100 m freestyle

Qiu Yuhan (born July 17, 1998) is a Chinese competitive swimmer. At the 2012 Summer Olympics in London, she competed for the national team in the Women's 4 × 100 metre freestyle relay, finishing in 4th place in the final.

== Personal bests (long course) ==
As of September 30, 2014

Event	Time	Meet	Date	Note(s)
100 m freestyle	54.40	2014 National Swimming Trials	October 14, 2014	
200 m freestyle	1.56.69	2016 National Swimming Championships	April, 2016	
