= Daria Mullakaeva =

Russian swimmer

Personal information
- Nationality: Russian
- Born: 18 June 1998 (age 28) Perm, Perm Krai, Russia

Sport
- Sport: Swimming
Medal record
Women's swimming
Representing Russia
World Championships (SC)
Bronze medal – third place	2016 Windsor	4x200 m freestyle
Summer Youth Olympics
Silver medal – second place	2014 Nanjing	4×100 m freestyle

Daria Mullakaeva (Russian: Дарья Васильевна Муллакаева; born 18 June 1998) is a Russian swimmer. She competed in the women's 4 × 200 metre freestyle relay event at the 2016 Summer Olympics.
