= Jess Lloyd =

British swimmer

Personal information
- Born: March 14, 1995 (age 31) Oldham, England

Sport
- Sport: Swimming
- Club: City of Manchester Aquatics Swim Team
Medal record
Representing England
Commonwealth Games
Silver medal – second place	2014 Glasgow	4x100m freestyle relay
Bronze medal – third place	2014 Glasgow	4x200m freestyle relay

Jessica Ashley Lloyd (born 14 March 1995) is a British swimmer. At the 2012 Summer Olympics, she competed for the national team in the Women's 4 x 100 metre freestyle relay, finishing in 5th place in the final. She is a member of the City of Manchester Aquatics Swim Team with the Manchester Aquatics Centre as training location.
