= Daria Sergeyevna Ustinova =

Russian swimmer

Daria Ustinova
Personal information
- Full name: Daria Sergeyevna Ustinova
- Nationality: Russia
- Born: 8 May 1998 (age 28) Saint Petersburg, Russia

Sport
- Sport: Swimming
Medal record
Women's swimming
Representing Russia
European Championships (SC)
Gold medal – first place	2019 Glasgow	4×50 m mixed freestyle
Gold medal – first place	2019 Glasgow	4×50 m mixed medley
Bronze medal – third place	2019 Glasgow	4×50 m medley
Summer Youth Olympics
Silver medal – second place	2014 Nanjing	4×100 m freestyle
Silver medal – second place	2014 Nanjing	4×100 m mixed medley
Bronze medal – third place	2014 Nanjing	50 m freestyle

Daria Sergeyevna Ustinova (Russian: Дарья Сергеевна Устинова; born 8 May 1998) is a Russian swimmer. She competed in the 2020 Summer Olympics.
