= Nathania van Niekerk =

South African swimmer (born 1999)

Personal information
- Nationality: South African
- Born: 22 January 1999 (age 26)

Sport
- Sport: Swimming

Nathania van Niekerk (born 22 January 1999) is a South African swimmer. She competed in the women's 200 metre backstroke at the 2019 World Aquatics Championships and she did not advance to the semi-finals.
