= Gabrielle Fa'amausili =

New Zealand swimmer (born 1999)

Personal information
- Born: 17 October 1999 (age 26) Auckland, New Zealand

Sport
- Sport: Swimming
- College team: University of Georgia
Medal record
Women's swimming
Representing New Zealand
Junior Pan Pacific Championships
Bronze medal – third place	2016 Maui	50 m freestyle

Gabrielle Fa'amausili (born 17 October 1999) is a New Zealand swimmer. She competed in the women's 50 metre backstroke event at the 2017 World Aquatics Championships. She withdrew from the New Zealand team for the 2018 Commonwealth Games after a knee injury.

Her father is former Samoa national rugby union team player Danny Kaleopa.

Awards
Preceded by Lydia Ko	Halberg Awards – Emerging Talent Award; 2013	Succeeded by Regan Gough
