= Rebecca Turner =

British swimmer

Personal information
- Born: 1 August 1992 (age 33) Rotherham, England
- Height: 153 cm (5 ft 0 in)
- Weight: 68 kg (150 lb)

Sport
- Sport: Swimming
Medal record
Representing England
Commonwealth Games
Silver medal – second place	2014 Glasgow	4x100m freestyle relay
Bronze medal – third place	2014 Glasgow	4x200m freestyle relay

Rebecca Turner (born 1 August 1992) is a British swimmer. At the 2012 Summer Olympics she finished 17th overall in the heats in the Women's 200 metre freestyle and failed to reach the semifinals.
