= Mackenzie Glover =

Canadian swimmer (born 1998)

Personal information
- Born: 18 February 1998 (age 28) Winnipeg, Manitoba

Sport
- Sport: Swimming
Medal record
Women's swimming
Representing Canada
Pan American Games
| Silver medal – second place | 2019 Lima | 4×100 m medley |
| Bronze medal – third place | 2019 Lima | 200 m backstroke |

Mackenzie Glover (born February 18, 1998, in Winnipeg, Manitoba) is a Canadian swimmer competing in backstroke, freestyle and butterfly events and attends and competes at North Carolina State University.

Glover is the holder of several Manitoba provincial records and past holder of a Canadian Age Group 100 meter short course backstroke record. She has also represented Canada at many international events including the Youth Olympic Games, Junior Pan Pacific Swimming Championships and the FINA Swimming World Cup. She is also a two time finalist at the Canadian Olympic trials in 2016 in both the 100 and 200 backstroke events.
