= Danielle Hanus =

Canadian swimmer (born 1998)

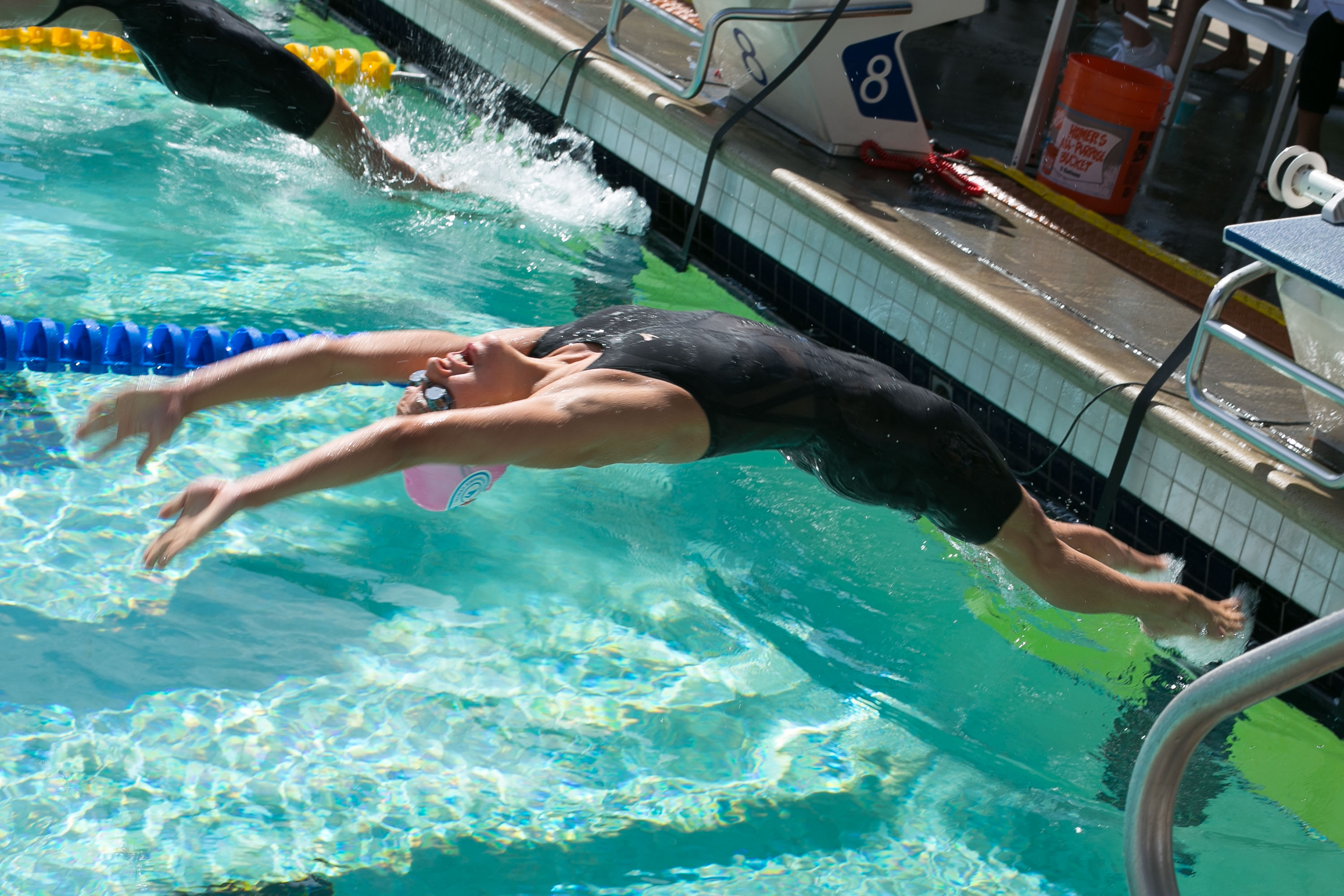
- Hanus at the 2017 Santa Clara Grand Prix

Personal information
- Full name: Danielle Franci Hanus
- National team: Canada
- Born: March 16, 1998 (age 28) Newmarket, Ontario, Canada
- Height: 5 ft 6 in (168 cm)
- Weight: 125 lb (57 kg)

Sport
- Sport: Swimming
- Strokes: Freestyle, medley, backstroke
- Club: Newmarket Stingrays
Medal record
Women's swimming
Representing Canada
Pan American Games
Gold medal – first place	2023 Santiago	4 x 100 m medley
Silver medal – second place	2019 Lima	100 m backstroke
Silver medal – second place	2019 Lima	100 m butterfly
Silver medal – second place	2019 Lima	4×100 m medley
Silver medal – second place	2019 Lima	4×100 m mixed medley
Bronze medal – third place	2023 Santiago	100 m backstroke
World Junior Championships
Bronze medal – third place	2015 Singapore	50 m backstroke
Junior Pan Pacific Championships
Silver medal – second place	2014 Maui	100 m backstroke
Silver medal – second place	2016 Maui	4×100 m medley
Bronze medal – third place	2014 Maui	4×100 m medley

Danielle Franci Hanus (born March 16, 1998) is a Canadian swimmer who competes in the women's freestyle, backstroke, and individual medley competitions.

== Career ==
She represented Canada at the finished 2014 Summer Youth Olympics in Nanjing, China, finishing 4th at the 50-metre backstroke, 7th at the 100-metre backstroke, 7th at the 200-metre backstroke and 13th at the 100-metre butterfly. Newmarket native, she also has represented Canada at the 2014 Junior Pan Pacific Swimming Championships and the 2014 Australian Youth tour. She started swimming at age four and At age six started competing with the Newmarket Stringrays, where she continues to train and compete. Her most memorable career highlight to date was beating the age group record in the 100-metre backstroke 2013 Canada Games.
