= 2018 Pan Pacific Swimming Championships – Women's 50 metre freestyle =

Women's 50 metre freestyle at the 2018 Pan Pacific Swimming Championships
- Venue: Tokyo Tatsumi International Swimming Center
- Dates: 12 August (heats & finals)
- Competitors: 28 from 8 nations
- Winning time: 23.81

Medalists
gold medal	Cate Campbell	Australia
silver medal	Simone Manuel	United States
bronze medal	Emma McKeon	Australia

The women's 50 metre freestyle competition at the 2018 Pan Pacific Swimming Championships took place on August 12 at the Tokyo Tatsumi International Swimming Center. The defending champion was Cate Campbell of Australia.

== Records ==
Prior to this competition, the existing world and Pan Pacific records were as follows:

World record	Sarah Sjöström (SWE)	23.67	Budapest, Hungary	29 July 2017
Pan Pacific Championships record	Cate Campbell (AUS)	23.96	Gold Coast, Australia	24 August 2014

== Results ==
All times are in minutes and seconds.

KEY:	QA	Qualified A Final	QB	Qualified B Final	CR	Championships record	NR	National record	PB	Personal best	SB	Seasonal best

=== Heats ===
The first round was held on 12 August from 10:00.

Only two swimmers from each country may advance to the A or B final. If a country not qualify any swimmer to the A final, that same country may qualify up to three swimmers to the B final.

Rank	Name	Nationality	Time	Notes
1	Cate Campbell	Australia	24.41	QA
2	Emma McKeon	Australia	24.47	QA
3	Simone Manuel	United States	24.56	QA
4	Taylor Ruck	Canada	24.70	QA
5	Rikako Ikee	Japan	24.76	QA
6	Abbey Weitzeil	United States	24.91	QA
6	Shayna Jack	Australia	24.91	QB
8	Kelsi Dahlia	United States	25.08	~~QB~~, WD
8	Mallory Comerford	United States	25.08	QB
10	Kayla Sanchez	Canada	25.11	QA
11	Margo Geer	United States	25.15	QB
12	Larissa Oliveira	Brazil	25.23	QA
13	Katie McLaughlin	United States	25.24	
14	Lorrane Ferreira	Brazil	25.34	QB
15	Sarah Fournier	Canada	25.35	QB
16	Kyla Leibel	Canada	25.43	QB
17	Olivia Smoliga	United States	25.46	
18	Mayuka Yamamoto	Japan	25.50	QB
19	Rebecca Smith	Canada	25.63	
20	Isabella Arcila	Colombia	25.66	QB
21	Alexia Zevnik	Canada	25.73	
22	Yui Yamane	Japan	25.79	
23	Ariarne Titmus	Australia	26.13	
24	Sachi Mochida	Japan	26.23	
25	Ai Soma	Japan	26.35	
26	Miranda Renner	Philippines	27.05	
27	Mineri Gomez	Guam	29.55	
–	Madeline Groves	Australia	DNS	

=== B Final ===
The B final was held on 12 August from 17:30.

Rank	Name	Nationality	Time	Notes
9	Shayna Jack	Australia	24.70	
10	Mallory Comerford	United States	24.80	
11	Margo Geer	United States	25.04	
12	Lorrane Ferreira	Brazil	25.08	
13	Isabella Arcila	Colombia	25.28	
14	Sarah Fournier	Canada	25.54	
15	Kyla Leibel	Canada	25.60	
16	Mayuka Yamamoto	Japan	25.64	

=== A Final ===
The A final was held on 12 August from 17:30.

Rank	Name	Nationality	Time	Notes
1st place, gold medalist(s)	Cate Campbell	Australia	23.81	CR
2nd place, silver medalist(s)	Simone Manuel	United States	24.22	
3rd place, bronze medalist(s)	Emma McKeon	Australia	24.34	
4	Taylor Ruck	Canada	24.47	
5	Abbey Weitzeil	United States	24.58	
6	Rikako Ikee	Japan	24.60	
7	Kayla Sanchez	Canada	24.94	
8	Larissa Oliveira	Brazil	25.03	
