= 2018 Pan Pacific Swimming Championships – Women's 100 metre freestyle =

Women's 100 metre freestyle at the 2018 Pan Pacific Swimming Championships
- Venue: Tokyo Tatsumi International Swimming Center
- Dates: 10 August (heats & finals)
- Competitors: 35 from 8 nations
- Winning time: 52.03

Medalists
gold medal	Cate Campbell	Australia
silver medal	Simone Manuel	United States
bronze medal	Taylor Ruck	Canada

The women's 100 metre freestyle competition at the 2018 Pan Pacific Swimming Championships took place on August 10 at the Tokyo Tatsumi International Swimming Center. The defending champion was Cate Campbell of Australia.

== Records ==
Prior to this competition, the existing world and Pan Pacific records were as follows:

World record	Sarah Sjöström (SWE)	51.71	Budapest, Hungary	23 July 2017
Pan Pacific Championships record	Cate Campbell (AUS)	52.62	Gold Coast, Australia	22 August 2014

== Results ==
All times are in minutes and seconds.

KEY:	QA	Qualified A Final	QB	Qualified B Final	CR	Championships record	NR	National record	PB	Personal best	SB	Seasonal best

=== Heats ===
The first round was held on 10 August from 10:00.

Only two swimmers from each country may advance to the A or B final. If a country does not qualify any swimmer to the A final, that same country may qualify up to three swimmers to the B final.

Rank	Name	Nationality	Time	Notes
1	Simone Manuel	United States	53.23	QA
2	Cate Campbell	Australia	53.27	QA
3	Mallory Comerford	United States	53.30	QA
4	Taylor Ruck	Canada	53.34	QA
5	Shayna Jack	Australia	53.61	QA
6	Emma McKeon	Australia	53.97	QB
7	Kayla Sanchez	Canada	54.02	QA
7	Margo Geer	United States	54.02	QB
9	Kelsi Dahlia	United States	54.09	QB
10	Kathryn McLaughlin	United States	54.14	
10	Rikako Ikee	Japan	54.14	QA
12	Madeline Groves	Australia	54.18	~~QB~~, WD
13	Abbigail Weitzeil	United States	54.20	
14	Allison Schmitt	United States	54.53	
15	Rebecca Smith	Canada	54.54	QB
16	Larissa Oliveira	Brazil	54.68	QA
17	Tomomi Aoki	Japan	54.84	QB
18	Alexia Zevnik	Canada	54.93	QB
18	Brianna Throssell	Australia	54.93	QB
20	Chihiro Igarashi	Japan	54.96	QB
21	Gabrielle DeLoof	United States	55.22	
22	Mayuka Yamamoto	Japan	55.32	
23	Kyla Leibel	Canada	55.37	
24	Rio Shirai	Japan	55.44	
25	Sarah Fournier	Canada	55.57	
26	Yui Yamane	Japan	55.73	
27	Lorrane Ferreira	Brazil	56.50	
28	Ai Soma	Japan	57.13	
29	Nicole Oliva	Philippines	57.17	
30	Miranda Renner	Philippines	1:00.05	
31	Mineri Gomez	Guam	1:04.40	
32	Gianna Garcia	Philippines	1:04.54	
33	Osisang Chilton	Palau	1:07.30	
–	Ariarne Titmus	Australia	DNS	
–	Kanako Watanabe	Japan	DNS	

=== B Final ===
The B final was held on 10 August from 18:00.

Rank	Name	Nationality	Time	Notes
9	Emma McKeon	Australia	53.37	
10	Kelsi Dahlia	United States	54.33	
11	Margo Geer	United States	54.47	
12	Brianna Throssell	Australia	54.50	
13	Tomomi Aoki	Japan	54.69	
14	Rebecca Smith	Canada	54.72	
15	Chihiro Igarashi	Japan	55.05	
16	Alexia Zevnik	Canada	55.45	

=== A Final ===
The A final was held on 10 August from 18:00.

Rank	Name	Nationality	Time	Notes
1st place, gold medalist(s)	Cate Campbell	Australia	52.03	CR, OC
2nd place, silver medalist(s)	Simone Manuel	United States	52.66	
3rd place, bronze medalist(s)	Taylor Ruck	Canada	52.72	
4	Mallory Comerford	United States	52.94	
5	Rikako Ikee	Japan	53.14	
6	Kayla Sanchez	Canada	53.68	
7	Shayna Jack	Australia	53.74	
8	Larissa Oliveira	Brazil	54.78	
