= 2014 FINA World Swimming Championships (25 m) – Women's 4 × 50 metre medley relay =

Women's 4 × 50 metre medley relay at the 2014 FINA World Swimming Championships (25 m)
- Dates: 5 December
- Competitors: 68 from 17 nations
- Winning time: 1:44.04

Medalists
gold medal	Mie Nielsen; Rikke Pedersen; Jeanette Ottesen; Pernille Blume	Denmark
silver medal	Felicia Lee; Emma Reaney; Claire Donahue; Natalie Coughlin	United States
bronze medal	Mathilde Cini; Charlotte Bonnet; Mélanie Henique; Anna Santamans	France

The Women's 4 × 50 metre medley relay competition of the 2014 FINA World Swimming Championships (25 m) was held on 5 December.

== Records ==
Prior to the competition, the existing world and championship records were as follows.

	Nation	Time	Location	Date
World record	Denmark	1:45.92	Herning	15 December 2013

== Results ==
=== Heats ===
The heats were held at 09:30.

Rank	Heat	Lane	Nation	Swimmers	Time	Notes
1	1	5	Denmark	Mie Nielsen (26.60); Rikke Pedersen (30.06); Jeanette Ottesen (25.79); Pernille Blume (24.31)	1:46.76	Q
2	2	0	United States	Felicia Lee (26.83); Emma Reaney (30.61); Claire Donahue (25.34); Amanda Weir (24.04)	1:46.82	Q
3	1	4	Brazil	Etiene Medeiros (26.80); Ana Carla Carvalho (30.62); Daiene Dias (25.62); Alessandra Marchioro (24.16)	1:47.20	Q, SA
4	2	5	China	Qiu Yuhan (27.09); Suo Ran (30.46); Lu Ying (25.50); Liu Xiang (24.35)	1:47.40	Q
4	2	1	Russia	Margarita Nesterova (27.82); Valentina Artemyeva (29.84); Svetlana Chimrova (25.85); Rozaliya Nasretdinova (23.89)	1:47.40	Q
6	1	3	France	Mathilde Cini (27.68); Charlotte Bonnet (30.64); Mélanie Henique (25.80); Anna Santamans (23.74)	1:47.86	Q
7	2	2	Italy	Arianna Barbieri (27.49); Arianna Castiglioni (30.51); Ilaria Bianchi (26.01); Aglaia Pezzato (24.01)	1:48.02	Q
8	1	2	Japan	Shiho Sakai (27.03); Rie Kaneto (30.56); Rino Hosoda (26.03); Yayoi Matsumoto (24.78)	1:48.40	Q
9	2	3	Finland	Anni Alitalo (27.48); Jenna Laukkanen (29.98); Emilia Pikkarainen (26.43); Hanna-Maria Seppälä (24.66)	1:48.55	
10	1	1	South Africa	Erin Gallagher (28.26); Tatjana Schoenmaker (32.06); Trudi Maree (27.04); Lehesta Kemp (24.80)	1:52.16	
11	2	7	Macau	Tan Chi Yan (31.67); Lei On Kei (32.83); Choi Weng Tong (31.07); Long Chi Wai (27.36)	2:02.93	
12	1	7	Papua New Guinea	Shanice Paraka (31.38); Savannah Tkatchenko (34.85); Tegan McCarthy (30.85); Anna-Liza Mopio-Jane (26.80)	2:03.88	
13	1	6	India	Aditi Dhumatkar (31.00); Anusha Sanjeev Mehta (38.85); Malavika Vishwanath (31.64); Thalasha Satish Prabhu (27.82)	2:09.31	
—	1	8	Turkey		DNS	
—	2	4	Algeria		DNS	
—	2	6	Great Britain		DNS	
—	2	8	Sweden		DNS	

=== Final ===
The final was held at 18:00.

Rank	Lane	Nation	Swimmers	Time	Notes
1st place, gold medalist(s)	4	Denmark	Mie Nielsen (26.39); Rikke Pedersen (29.56); Jeanette Ottesen (24.09); Pernille Blume (24.00)	1:44.04	WR
2nd place, silver medalist(s)	5	United States	Felicia Lee (26.37); Emma Reaney (29.42); Claire Donahue (25.33); Natalie Coughlin (23.80)	1:44.92	
3rd place, bronze medalist(s)	7	France	Mathilde Cini (26.61); Charlotte Bonnet (30.29); Mélanie Henique (25.20); Anna Santamans (23.79)	1:45.89	
4	6	China	Qiu Yuhan (26.86); Suo Ran (30.20); Lu Ying (24.87); Liu Xiang (24.22)	1:46.15	
5	1	Italy	Elena Di Liddo (27.07); Arianna Castiglioni (30.27); Ilaria Bianchi (25.70); Erika Ferraioli (23.43)	1:46.47	
5	3	Brazil	Etiene Medeiros (26.03); Ana Carla Carvalho (30.38); Daynara de Paula (25.68); Larissa Oliveira (24.38)	1:46.47	SA
7	2	Russia	Daria Ustinova (27.07); Valentina Artemyeva (29.79); Svetlana Chimrova (25.57); Rozaliya Nasretdinova (24.07)	1:46.50	
8	8	Japan	Shiho Sakai (26.73); Satomi Suzuki (30.04); Rino Hosoda (25.58); Yayoi Matsumoto (24.37)	1:46.72	
