= Lorrane =

Lorrane is a given name. Notable people with this name include:

- Lorrane Ferreira (born 1993), Brazilian swimmer
- Lorrane Oliveira (born 1998), Brazilian artistic gymnast
