= 2014 Pan Pacific Swimming Championships – Women's 100 metre butterfly =

Women's 100 metre butterfly at the 2014 Pan Pacific Swimming Championships
- Venue: Gold Coast Aquatic Centre
- Dates: August 23, 2014 (heats & finals)
- Competitors: 26
- Winning time: 57.64

Medalists
gold medal	Alicia Coutts	Australia
silver medal	Lu Ying	China
bronze medal	Kendyl Stewart	United States

The women's 100 metre butterfly competition at the 2014 Pan Pacific Swimming Championships took place on August 23 at the Gold Coast Aquatic Centre. The last champion was Dana Vollmer of US.

This race consisted of two lengths of the pool, all in butterfly.

== Records ==
Prior to this competition, the existing world and Pan Pacific records were as follows:

World record	Dana Vollmer (USA)	55.98	London, UK	July 29, 2012
Pan Pacific Championships record	Jessicah Schipper (AUS)	57.30	Victoria, Canada	August 19, 2006

== Results ==
All times are in minutes and seconds.

KEY:	q	Fastest non-qualifiers	Q	Qualified	CR	Championships record	NR	National record	PB	Personal best	SB	Seasonal best

=== Heats ===
The first round was held on August 23, at 10:12.

Rank	Name	Nationality	Time	Notes
1	Alicia Coutts	Australia	57.84	QA
2	Emma McKeon	Australia	58.29	QA
3	Claire Donahue	United States	58.41	QA
4	Kendyl Stewart	United States	58.47	QA
5	Felicia Lee	United States	58.59	QA
6	Lu Ying	China	58.74	QA
7	Katie McLaughlin	United States	58.77	QA
8	Brittany Elmslie	Australia	58.87	QA
9	Katerine Savard	Canada	59.15	QB
10	Etiene Medeiros	Brazil	59.29	QB
11	Audrey Lacroix	Canada	59.40	QB
12	Daynara de Paula	Brazil	59.62	QB
13	Natsumi Hoshi	Japan	59.81	QB
14	Madeline Groves	Australia	59.84	QB
15	Miki Uchida	Japan	59.86	QB
16	Vanessa Mohr	South Africa	1:00.22	QB
17	Caitlin Leverenz	United States	1:00.27	
18	Rachel Bootsma	United States	1:00.32	
18	Miyu Nakano	Japan	1:00.32	
20	Ivy Martin	United States	1:00.75	
21	Samantha Lee	New Zealand	1:00.81	
22	Laura Quilter	New Zealand	1:01.00	
23	Cammile Adams	United States	1:01.06	
24	Sze Hang Yu	Hong Kong	1:01.48	
25	Sakiko Shimizu	Japan	1:01.52	
26	Chan Kin Lok	Hong Kong	1:03.74	

=== B Final ===
The B final was held on August 23, at 19:38.

Rank	Name	Nationality	Time	Notes
9	Felicia Lee	United States	58.37	
10	Madeline Groves	Australia	58.88	
11	Natsumi Hoshi	Japan	59.20	
12	Daynara de Paula	Brazil	59.66	
13	Miki Uchida	Japan	59.68	
14	Miyu Nakano	Japan	59.75	
15	Samantha Lee	New Zealand	1:00.44	
16	Vanessa Mohr	South Africa	1:01.19	

=== A Final ===
The A final was held on August 24, at 20:24.

Rank	Name	Nationality	Time	Notes
1st place, gold medalist(s)	Alicia Coutts	Australia	57.64	
2nd place, silver medalist(s)	Lu Ying	China	57.76	
3rd place, bronze medalist(s)	Kendyl Stewart	United States	57.82	
4	Emma McKeon	Australia	57.85	
5	Katerine Savard	Canada	57.95	
6	Claire Donahue	United States	58.31	
7	Etiene Medeiros	Brazil	58.67	
8	Audrey Lacroix	Canada	58.82	
