= 2014 Pan Pacific Swimming Championships – Women's 100 metre freestyle =

Women's 100 metre freestyle at the 2014 Pan Pacific Swimming Championships
- Venue: Gold Coast Aquatic Centre
- Dates: August 22, 2014 (heats & finals)
- Competitors: 46
- Winning time: 52.72

Medalists
gold medal	Cate Campbell	Australia
silver medal	Bronte Campbell	Australia
bronze medal	Simone Manuel	United States

The women's 100 metre freestyle competition at the 2014 Pan Pacific Swimming Championships took place on August 22 at the Gold Coast Aquatic Centre. The last champion was Natalie Coughlin of US.

This race consisted of two lengths of the pool, both lengths being in freestyle.

== Records ==
Prior to this competition, the existing world and Pan Pacific records were as follows:

World record	Britta Steffen (GER)	52.07	Rome, Italy	July 31, 2009
Pan Pacific Championships record	Natalie Coughlin (USA)	53.67	Irvine, United States	August 19, 2010

== Results ==
All times are in minutes and seconds.

KEY:	q	Fastest non-qualifiers	Q	Qualified	CR	Championships record	NR	National record	PB	Personal best	SB	Seasonal best

=== Heats ===
The first round was held on August 22, at 10:38.

Rank	Name	Nationality	Time	Notes
1	Cate Campbell	Australia	52.62	QA, CR
2	Bronte Campbell	Australia	53.50	QA
3	Melanie Schlanger	Australia	53.65	QA
4	Missy Franklin	United States	53.75	QA
5	Simone Manuel	United States	53.91	QA
6	Brittany Elmslie	Australia	54.29	QA
7	Abbey Weitzeil	United States	54.50	QA
8	Shannon Vreeland	United States	54.55	QA
9	Chantal van Landeghem	Canada	54.76	QB
10	Miki Uchida	Japan	54.86	QB
11	Emma McKeon	Australia	54.96	QB
12	Victoria Poon	Canada	55.06	QB
13	Katie Ledecky	United States	55.25	QB
14	Bronte Barratt	Australia	55.28	QB
15	Katie McLaughlin	United States	55.33	QB
16	Camille Cheng	Hong Kong	55.45	QB
17	Graciele Herrmann	Brazil	55.47	
18	Madeline Locus	United States	55.54	
19	Felicia Lee	United States	55.63	
20	Misaki Yamaguchi	Japan	55.66	
21	Yayoi Matsumoto	Japan	55.74	
21	Ivy Martin	United States	55.74	
23	Daynara de Paula	Brazil	55.80	
24	Alyson Ackman	Canada	55.84	
25	Laura Quilter	New Zealand	55.87	
26	Michelle Williams	Canada	55.88	
27	Sandrine Mainville	Canada	55.92	
28	Elizabeth Pelton	United States	55.99	
29	Samantha Cheverton	Canada	56.03	
30	Madeline Groves	Australia	56.11	
31	Samantha Lucie-Smith	New Zealand	56.25	
32	Yasuko Miyamoto	Japan	56.40	
33	Chihiro Igarashi	Japan	56.55	
34	Zhang Sishi	China	56.63	
35	Aya Takano	Japan	56.72	
36	Zhang Jiaqi	China	56.73	
37	Miyuki Takemura	Japan	57.00	
38	Wang Shijia	China	57.43	
39	Samantha Lee	New Zealand	57.52	
40	Sze Hang Yu	Hong Kong	57.59	
41	Carolina Bergamaschi	Brazil	57.78	
42	Kin Lok Chan	Hong Kong	58.41	
43	Claudia Lau	Hong Kong	58.53	
44	Vanessa Mohr	South Africa	59.04	
45	Yin Fan	China	59.85	
46	Marce Loubser	South Africa	1:00.21	

=== B Final ===
The B final was held on August 22, at 20:03.

Rank	Name	Nationality	Time	Notes
9	Melanie Schlanger	Australia	53.65	
10	Abbey Weitzeil	United States	54.78	
11	Graciele Herrmann	Brazil	54.94	
12	Misaki Yamaguchi	Japan	55.17	
13	Yayoi Matsumoto	Japan	55.60	
14	Alyson Ackman	Canada	55.79	
15	Samantha Lucie-Smith	New Zealand	55.97	
16	Laura Quilter	New Zealand	56.00	

=== A Final ===
The A final was held on August 22, at 20:03.

Rank	Name	Nationality	Time	Notes
1st place, gold medalist(s)	Cate Campbell	Australia	52.72	
2nd place, silver medalist(s)	Bronte Campbell	Australia	53.45	
3rd place, bronze medalist(s)	Simone Manuel	United States	53.71	
4	Missy Franklin	United States	53.87	
5	Chantal van Landeghem	Canada	54.55	
6	Victoria Poon	Canada	54.82	
7	Miki Uchida	Japan	54.91	
8	Camille Cheng	Hong Kong	55.09	
