= 2014 NCAA Division I Women's Swimming and Diving Championships =

American college aquatic sports competition

- Host city: Minneapolis, Minnesota
- Date: March 2014
- Venue(s): University Aquatic Center; University of Minnesota

The 2014 NCAA Women's Division I Swimming and Diving Championships were contested at the 33rd annual NCAA-sanctioned swim meet to determine the team and individual national champions of Division I women's collegiate swimming and diving in the United States.

This year's events were hosted by the University of Minnesota at the University Aquatic Center in Minneapolis, Minnesota.

Defending champions Georgia again topped the team standings, finishing 125.5 points ahead of Stanford. This was the Lady Bulldogs' sixth women's team title.

== Team standings ==
- Note: Top 10 only
- (H) = Hosts
- ^{(DC)} = Defending champions

Rank	Team	Points
1st place, gold medalist(s)	Georgia ^{(DC)}	528
2nd place, silver medalist(s)	Stanford	402 1/2
3rd place, bronze medalist(s)	California	386
4	Texas A&M	336
5	USC	252
6	Florida	239
7	Tennessee	223
8	Arizona	156
9	Texas	144
10	Minnesota (H)	136 1/2

== Swimming results ==
Event	Gold		Silver		Bronze	
50 freestyle	Olivia Smoliga; Georgia	21.59	Kasey Carlson; USC	21.72	Margo Geer; Arizona	21.73
100 freestyle	Margo Geer; Arizona	47.10	Lia Neal; Stanford	47.17	Missy Franklin; California	47.26
200 freestyle	Missy Franklin; California	1:40.31; US, AR	Shannon Vreeland; Georgia	1:42.26	Lindsay Gendron; Tennessee	1:42.55
500 freestyle	Brittany MacLean; Georgia	4:32.53; NC	Missy Franklin; California	4:32.66	Amber McDermott; Georgia	4:33.97
1650 freestyle	Brittany MacLean; Georgia	15:27.84; NC	Leah Smith; Virginia	15:40.27	Amber McDermott; Georgia	15:42.04
100 backstroke	Paige Miller; Texas A&M	50.77	Cindy Tran; California	50.81	Felicia Lee; Stanford	50.91
200 backstroke	Brooke Snodgrass; Indiana	1:50.52	Elizabeth Pelton; California	1:50.55	Courtney Bartholomew; Virginia	1:50.84
100 breaststroke	Breeja Larson; Texas A&M	57.23; US, AR	Emily McClellan; Wisconsin Milwaukee	57.76	Emma Reaney; Notre Dame	57.79
200 breaststroke	Emma Reaney; Notre Dame	2:04.06; US, AR	Katie Olsen; Stanford Breeja Larson; Texas A&M	2:05.88	None awarded	
100 butterfly	Felicia Lee; Stanford	50.89	Kelsi Worrell; Louisville	51.09	Marne Erasmus; SMU	51.10
200 butterfly	Cammile Adams; Texas A&M	1:52.25	Maya DiRado; Stanford	1:52.99	Lindsay Gendron; Tennessee	1:53.05
200 IM	Maya DiRado; Stanford	1:52.50	Melanie Margalis; Georgia	1:52.64	Celina Li; California	1:53.85
400 IM	Maya DiRado; Stanford	3:58.12	Elizabeth Beisel; Florida	3:58.84	Melanie Margalis; Georgia	4:00.30
200 freestyle relay	Stanford; Maddy Schaefer (21.91); Lia Neal (21.37); Felicia Lee (21.20); Katie Olsen (21.75)	1:26.23	California; Kaylin Bing (22.08); Cindy Tran (21.65); Missy Franklin (21.50); Farida Osman (21.44)	1:26.67	Georgia; Olivia Smoliga (21.67); Madeline Locus (21.91); Jessica Graber (22.07); Chantal Van Landeghem (21.54)	1:27.19
400 freestyle relay	Stanford; Maddy Schaefer (47.91); Felicia Lee (47.92); Maya DiRado (47.65); Lia Neal (47.14)	3:10.83	Arizona; Margo Geer (46.86); Alana Pazevic (48.20); Bonnie Brandon (48.00); Grace Finnegan (47.93)	3:10.99	California; Kaylin Bing (48.72); Rachael Acker (48.02); Missy Franklin (47.08); Farida Osman (47.55)	3:11.37
800 freestyle relay	California; Rachael Acker (1:45.46); Caroline Piehl (1:43.82); Elizabeth Pelton (1:45.58); Missy Franklin (1:40.08)	6:54.94	Georgia; Shannon Vreeland (1:43.10); Amber McDermott (1:44.81); Jordan Mattern (1:44.52); Brittany MacLean (1:42.66)	6:53.84	Stanford; Julia Anderson (1:45.46); Maya DiRado (1:42.70); Nicole Stafford (1:44.21); Lia Neal (1:43.25)	6:55.62
200 medley relay	Stanford; Felicia Lee (23.56); Katie Olsen (26.77); Nicole Stafford (23.32); Maddy Schaefer (21.30)	1:34.95	Tennessee; Lauren Solernou (24.11); Molly Hannis (26.40); Harper Bruens (23.34); Faith Johnson (21.47)	1:35.32	Florida; Sinead Russell (24.47); Hilda Lúthersdóttir (27.04); Ellese Zalewski (22.71); Natalie Hinds (21.29)	1:35.42
400 medley relay	Stanford; Maya DiRado (51.42); Katie Olsen (58.27); Felicia Lee (50.82); Lia Neal (47.00)	3:27.51; US, AR	Texas A&M; Paige Miller (50.70); Breeja Larson (57.43); Caroline McElhany (52.19); Liliana Ibanez (47.81)	3:28.13	Georgia; Olivia Smoliga (51.45); Melanie Margalis (58.56); Lauren Harrington (52.01); Shannon Vreeland (47.41)	3:29.43

Legend: US – U.S. Open record; NC – NCAA record; AR – American record;

== Diving Results ==
Event	Gold		Silver		Bronze	
1 m diving	Laura Ryan; Georgia	338.60	Maren Taylor; Texas	333.75	Kaylea Arnett; Virginia Tech	332.70
3 m diving	Laura Ryan; Georgia	423.15	Maren Taylor; Texas	399.30	Kaixuan Zhang; Southern Illinois	385.20
Platform diving	Haley Ishimatsu; USC	365.15	Emma Ivory-Ganja; Texas	349.30	Laura Ryan; Georgia	345.25

== See also ==
- List of college swimming and diving teams
