= Swimming at the 2019 Pan American Games – Women's 50 metre freestyle =

Women's 50 metre freestyle at the 2019 Pan American Games
- Venues: Villa Deportiva Nacional, VIDENA
- Dates: August 9 (preliminaries and finals)
- Competitors: 29 from 24 nations
- Winning time: 24.88

Medalists
Gold medal	Etiene Medeiros	Brazil
Silver medal	Margo Geer	United States
Bronze medal	Madison Kennedy	United States

The women's 50 metre freestyle competition of the swimming events at the 2019 Pan American Games was held on 9 August 2019 at the Villa Deportiva Nacional Videna cluster.

== Records ==
Prior to this competition, the existing world and Pan American Games records were as follows:

World record	Sarah Sjöström (SWE)	23.67	Budapest, Hungary	July 29, 2017
Pan American Games record	Arianna Vanderpool-Wallace (BAH)	24.31	Toronto, Canada	July 17, 2015

== Results ==
KEY:	q	Fastest non-qualifiers	Q	Qualified	GR	Games record	NR	National record	PB	Personal best	SB	Seasonal best

=== Heats ===
The first round was held on August 9.

Rank	Heat	Lane	Name	Nationality	Time	Notes
1	2	4	Madison Kennedy	United States	25.46	QA
2	4	5	Lorrane Ferreira	Brazil	25.50	QA
3	3	4	Margo Geer	United States	25.51	QA
4	4	4	Etiene Medeiros	Brazil	25.53	QA
5	2	3	Karen Torrez	Bolivia	25.72	QA
6	2	5	Kyla Leibel	Canada	25.77	QA
7	2	6	Alyson Ackman	Canada	25.78	QA
8	3	5	Isabella Arcila	Colombia	25.83	QA
9	4	6	Allyson Ponson	Aruba	25.90	QB
10	3	3	Jeserik Pinto	Venezuela	26.12	QB
11	3	2	Anicka Delgado	Ecuador	26.36	QB
12	3	6	Vanessa García	Puerto Rico	26.54	QB
13	2	7	Julimar Avila	Honduras	26.69	QB, NR
14	4	3	Sirena Rowe	Colombia	26.72	WD
15	4	2	Madelyn Moore	Bermuda	26.79	QB
16	2	2	Catharine Cooper	Panama	26.81	QB
17	3	1	Ariel Weech	Bahamas	26.84	QB
18	4	8	Inés Marín	Chile	26.90	QSO
18	4	7	Emily MacDonald	Jamaica	26.90	QSO
20	2	1	Rafaela Fernandini	Peru	27.05	
21	3	7	Lauren Hew	Cayman Islands	27.13	
22	2	8	Inés Remersaro	Uruguay	27.55	
23	4	1	María Mejia	Guatemala	27.56	
23	1	4	Alexia Sotomayor	Peru	27.56	
25	3	8	María Hernández	Nicaragua	27.74	
26	1	5	Kimberly Ince	Grenada	28.72	
27	1	6	Nikita Fiedtkou	Guyana	29.24	
28	1	2	Bianca Mitchell	Antigua and Barbuda	29.30	
29	1	3	Mya de Freitas	Saint Vincent and the Grenadines	29.57	

=== Swim-off ===
The swim-off was also held on August 9.

Rank	Lane	Name	Nationality	Time	Notes
18	5	Emily MacDonald	Jamaica	27.16	
19	4	Inés Marín	Chile	27.28	

=== Final B ===
The B final was also held on August 9.

Rank	Lane	Name	Nationality	Time	Notes
9	5	Jeserik Pinto	Venezuela	26.08	
10	3	Anicka Delgado	Ecuador	26.14	
11	4	Allyson Ponson	Aruba	26.19	
12	6	Vanessa García	Puerto Rico	26.43	
13	8	Ariel Weech	Bahamas	26.48	
14	7	Madelyn Moore	Bermuda	26.52	
15	2	Julimar Avila	Honduras	26.91	
16	1	Catherine Cooper	Panama	27.01	

=== Final A ===
The A final was also held on August 9.

Rank	Lane	Name	Nationality	Time	Notes
1st place, gold medalist(s)	6	Etiene Medeiros	Brazil	24.88	
2nd place, silver medalist(s)	3	Margo Geer	United States	25.03	
3rd place, bronze medalist(s)	4	Madison Kennedy	United States	25.14	
4	7	Kyla Leibel	Canada	25.52	
4	5	Lorrane Ferreira	Brazil	25.52	
6	2	Karen Torrez	Bolivia	25.56	
7	8	Isabella Arcila	Colombia	25.61	
8	1	Alyson Ackman	Canada	25.87	
