= Kendyl Stewart =

American swimmer (born 1994)

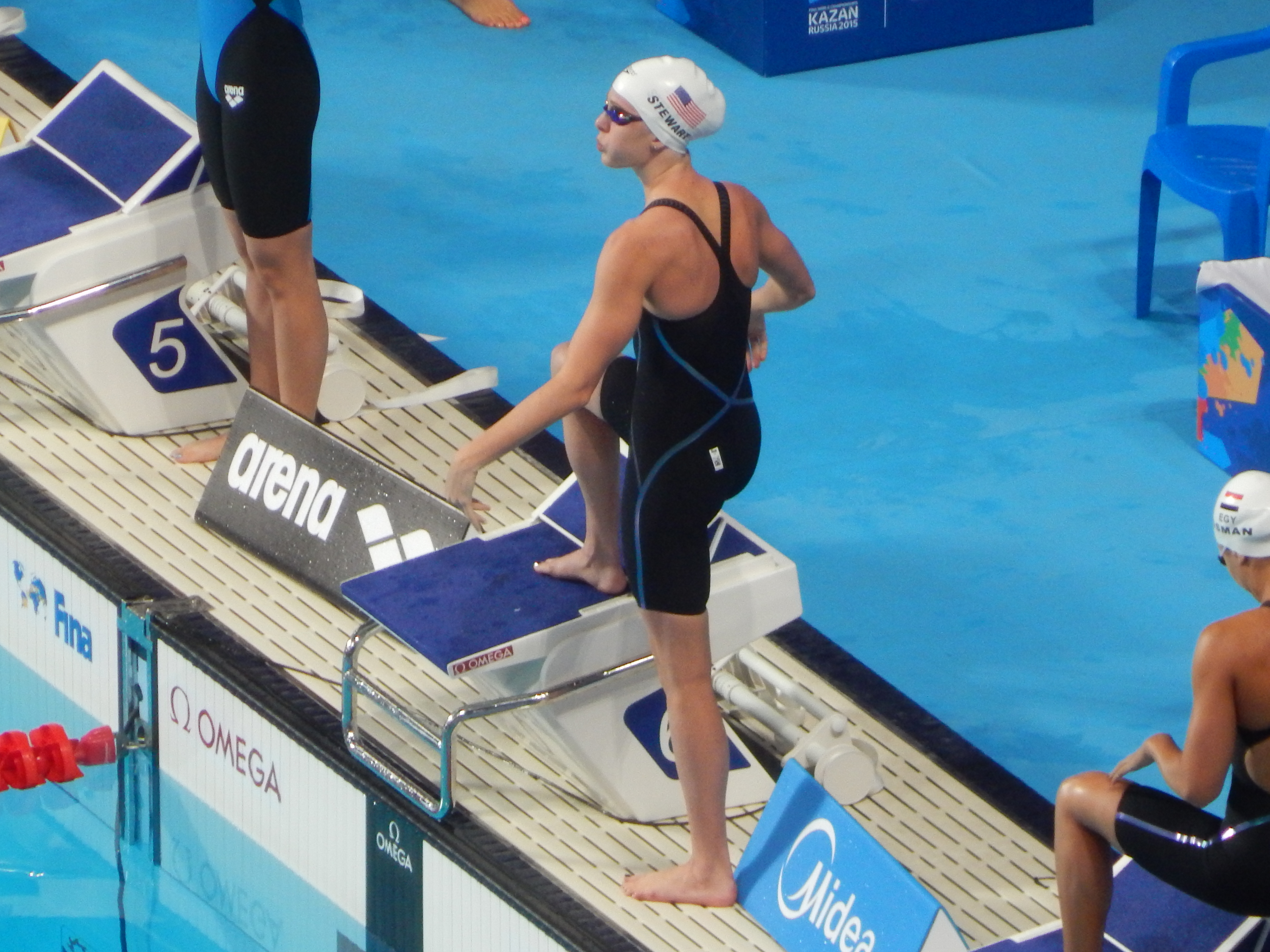
- Stewart in 2015

Personal information
- National team: United States
- Born: August 17, 1994 (age 32) Newton, Massachusetts, U.S.
- Height: 5 ft 10 in (178 cm)
- Weight: 134 lb (61 kg)

Sport
- Sport: Swimming
- Strokes: Backstroke, butterfly
- Club: North Coast Aquatics
- College team: University of Southern California
Medal record
Women's swimming
Representing the United States
World Championships (LC)
Silver medal – second place	2015 Kazan	4×100 m mixed medley
World Championships (SC)
Gold medal – first place	2018 Hangzhou	4×50 m medley
Gold medal – first place	2018 Hangzhou	4×100 m medley
Gold medal – first place	2018 Hangzhou	4×50 m mixed medley
Silver medal – second place	2018 Hangzhou	100 m butterfly
Pan Pacific Championships
Silver medal – second place	2014 Gold Coast	4×100 m medley
Bronze medal – third place	2014 Gold Coast	100 m butterfly
Pan American Games
Gold medal – first place	2019 Lima	100 m butterfly
Gold medal – first place	2019 Lima	4×100 m freestyle
Gold medal – first place	2019 Lima	4×100 m medley
Summer Universiade
Bronze medal – third place	2013 Kazan	4×100 m medley
Representing the USC Trojans
NCAA Championships
Bronze medal – third place	2015 Greensboro	100 y butterfly

Kendyl Stewart (born August 17, 1994) is an American competitive swimmer who specializes in backstroke and butterfly events.

== Career ==
Stewart attends the University of Southern California, where she is a member of the USC Trojans swimming and diving team. At the NCAA Championships, she placed third in the 100 yard butterfly in 2015 and 4th in the 200 yard backstroke in 2013. She won a bronze medal for her prelims swim in the 4 × 100 m medley relay at the 2013 Summer Universiade (World University Games).

At the 2014 Pan Pacific Swimming Championships, Stewart won a silver medal in the 4 × 100 m medley relay and a bronze medal in the 100 m butterfly.

Stewart represented the United States at the 2015 World Aquatics Championships where she won a silver medal for her prelim swim in the 4 × 100 m mixed medley relay. That prelims swim also set a World Record. She placed 4th in the 4 × 100 m medley relay, 9th in the 50 m butterfly, and 10th in the 100 m butterfly.

== Coaching career ==
Stewart currently coaches in the Carlsbad, California, area with the private coaching service CoachUp.
