= Bronte Campbell =

Australian swimmer (born 1994)

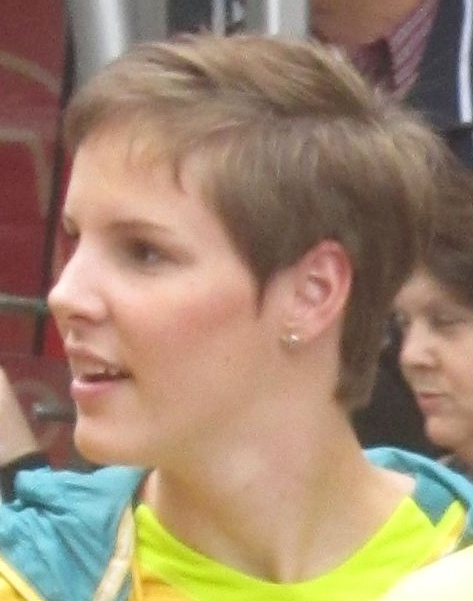
- Campbell in 2014

Personal information
- National team: Australia
- Born: 14 May 1994 (age 32) Blantyre, Malawi
- Height: 179 cm (5 ft 10 in)
- Weight: 58 kg (128 lb)
- Spouse: Benfield Lainchbury (m. 2026)

Sport
- Sport: Swimming
- Strokes: Freestyle
- Club: Commercial SC
- Coach: Simon Cusack
Medal record
Event	1st	2nd	3rd
Olympic Games	3	0	1
World Championships (LC)	5	4	2
World Championships (SC)	0	2	0
Pan Pacific Championships	1	2	0
Commonwealth Games	5	2	1
World Junior Championships	1	0	1
Total	15	10	5
Women's swimming
Representing Australia
Olympic Games
Gold medal – first place	2016 Rio de Janeiro	4×100 m freestyle
Gold medal – first place	2020 Tokyo	4×100 m freestyle
Gold medal – first place	2024 Paris	4×100 m freestyle
Bronze medal – third place	2020 Tokyo	4×100 m mixed medley
World Championships (LC)
Gold medal – first place	2015 Kazan	50 m freestyle
Gold medal – first place	2015 Kazan	100 m freestyle
Gold medal – first place	2015 Kazan	4×100 m freestyle
Gold medal – first place	2019 Gwangju	4×100 m freestyle
Gold medal – first place	2019 Gwangju	4×100 m mixed medley
Silver medal – second place	2013 Barcelona	4×100 m freestyle
Silver medal – second place	2017 Budapest	4x100 m freestyle
Silver medal – second place	2017 Budapest	4x100 m mixed medley
Silver medal – second place	2019 Gwangju	4×100 m mixed freestyle
Bronze medal – third place	2015 Kazan	4×100 m medley
Bronze medal – third place	2017 Budapest	4x100 m medley
World Championships (SC)
Silver medal – second place	2014 Doha	50 m freestyle
Silver medal – second place	2014 Doha	4×100 m medley
Pan Pacific Championships
Gold medal – first place	2014 Gold Coast	4×100 m freestyle
Silver medal – second place	2014 Gold Coast	50 m freestyle
Silver medal – second place	2014 Gold Coast	100 m freestyle
Commonwealth Games
Gold medal – first place	2014 Glasgow	4×100 m freestyle
Gold medal – first place	2014 Glasgow	4×100 m medley
Gold medal – first place	2018 Gold Coast	100 m freestyle
Gold medal – first place	2018 Gold Coast	4×100 m freestyle
Gold medal – first place	2018 Gold Coast	4×100 m medley
Silver medal – second place	2014 Glasgow	100 m freestyle
Silver medal – second place	2018 Gold Coast	50 m freestyle
Bronze medal – third place	2014 Glasgow	50 m freestyle
World Junior Championships
Gold medal – first place	2011 Lima	50 m freestyle
Bronze medal – third place	2011 Lima	100 m freestyle

Bronte Campbell OAM (born 14 May 1994) is a Malawi-born, Australian retired competitive swimmer. A four time Olympian, Campbell is a triple Olympic gold medallist and a former World Champion in the 50 and 100 m freestyle, having won both titles in 2015.

Her older sister Cate is also a competitive swimmer, and in 2012, the two became the first Australian siblings on the same Olympic swimming team since 1972. They are the first Australian sisters to ever compete within the same swimming event, also having claimed gold together in the 4 x 100 m freestyle relay in 2016 and 2021.

== Early life ==
Campbell was born in the city of Blantyre in Malawi. She is the second of five children born to Eric (an accountant) and Jenny (a nurse) Campbell. She has an older sister, Cate, two younger sisters and a younger brother, Jessica, Abigail and Hamish. Hamish has severe cerebral palsy and requires around-the-clock care. She shares a birthday with Hamish, with Hamish being four years younger. Jenny used to be a synchronised swimmer and taught her four daughters to swim.

== Career ==
Campbell's family moved from Malawi to Australia in 2001 and she and Cate joined the Indooroopilly Swimming Club in Brisbane that same year. Their coach at Commercial, Simon Cusack, continues to coach both sisters.

In 2009, Campbell won gold in the 50 metre freestyle at the Australian Youth Olympic Festival. In 2011, she won gold in the same event at the 2011 FINA World Junior Swimming Championships in Lima, Peru.

=== 2012 ===
Campbell competed in the women's 50 meter freestyle at the 2012 Summer Olympics in London. She and her sister Cate swam in the same heat, finishing second and third and qualifying for the semi-final in ninth and tenth place, respectively.

=== 2013 ===
At the 2013 Australian Swimming Championships she won silver in the 50 and 100 metre freestyle events finishing behind sister Cate in both and qualified for the 2013 World Aquatics Championships. At the World Championships, she teamed up with Cate, Emma McKeon and Alicia Coutts in the 4 × 100 metre freestyle relay where they won the silver medal, finishing 0.12 of a second behind the United States.

=== 2014 ===
Competing at the 2014 FINA World Swimming Championships (25 m) in Doha, she won two silver medals, one in the 50 metre freestyle event (timing 23.62) behind Ranomi Kromowidjojo, and the other in the 4 × 100 metre medley relay behind the Danish team. She finished fourth (timing 51.65) in the finals of the 100-metre freestyle event, behind Femke Heemskerk, Ranomi Kromowidjojo and Sarah Sjöström.

=== 2015 ===
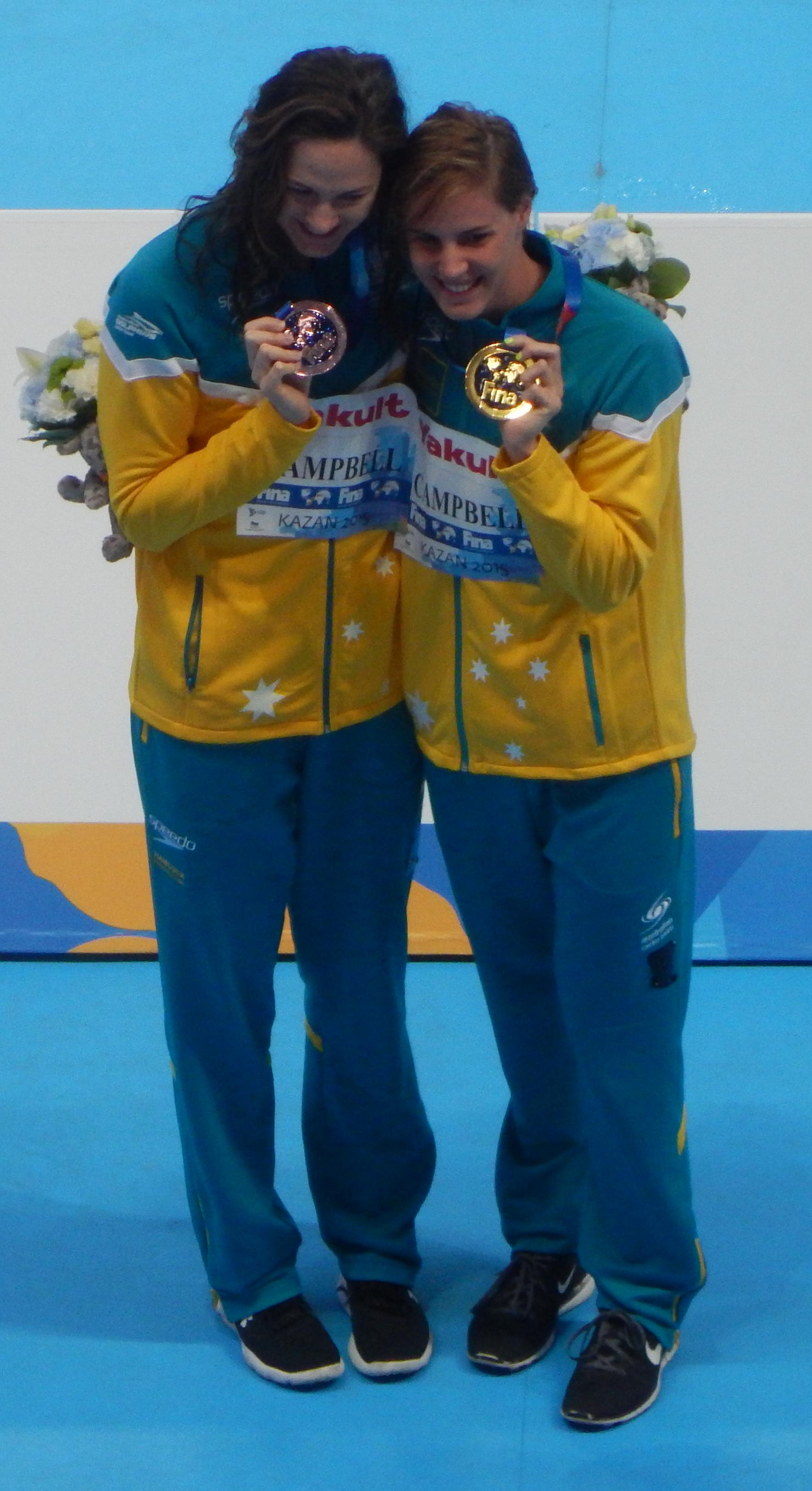
With Cate Campbell (left) in Kazan 2015

At the 2015 World Championships in Kazan, she won three gold medals and one bronze. She finished first in the 100 metre freestyle event (in 52.52), beating Sarah Sjöström and Cate Campbell, and the 50 metre freestyle event (in 24.12), beating Ranomi Kromowidjojo and Sarah Sjöström.

She also won gold in the 4×100 metre freestyle relay, beating the Dutch and US teams by a comfortable lead, and a bronze medal in the 4 × 100 metre medley relay behind the Chinese and Swedish teams.

=== 2016 ===
At the 2016 Summer Olympics, Campbell represented Australia in both the 50 m and 100 m freestyle, as well as the 4 × 100 m freestyle relay (in which they came first and set a new world record). Despite being the reigning world champion in the 50m and 100m freestyle, she did not win a medal in these events, finishing seventh and fourth, respectively in the finals.

=== 2018 ===
At the Gold Coast Commonwealth Games, Campbell won gold in the 4x100m freestyle, silver in the 50m freestyle, gold in the 100m freestyle, and gold in the 4x100m medley relay.

=== 2021 ===
Campbell starred in Head Above Water, a documentary series focusing on four Australian swimmers: Ian Thorpe, Kyle Chalmers, Cody Simpson, and Campbell herself. Campbell qualified for her third Olympics in Tokyo. She won gold in the women's 4x100m freestyle relay and bronze in the 4x100m mixed medley relay.

=== 2022 ===
In May 2022, Campbell appeared as a contestant on the sixth season of The Celebrity Apprentice Australia.

=== 2024 ===
After an 18 month break from swimming following the Tokyo Games, Campbell returned to the pool under new coach Shannon Rollason in Canberra. In June 2024, she qualified for her fourth Olympic Games in Paris in the Women's 4 x 100m Freestyle relay team, which went on to win gold in Paris. Campbell become only the fifth Australian swimmer to compete at four Olympics.

== Personal life ==
Campbell has completed her Business Degree at QUT Queensland University of Technology, majoring in Public Relations. She has also launched a start-up sustainable activewear business called Earthletica, which aims to create high quality activewear that is good for the planet.

In March 2026, Campbell married Benfield Lainchbury.

She is also a poet, writing poems and reading them out to the swim team before a competition to give them motivation.

In June 2026, Campbell announced her retirement from competitive swimming.

== Results in major championships ==
Meet	50 freestyle	100 freestyle	4×100 free	4×200 free	4×100 medley	4×100 Mixed free	4×100 Mixed medley
OG 2012	10th						
WC 2013	5th	11th	2nd place, silver medalist(s)				
CG 2014	3rd place, bronze medalist(s)	2nd place, silver medalist(s)	1st place, gold medalist(s)		1st place, gold medalist(s)		
PP 2014	2nd place, silver medalist(s)	2nd place, silver medalist(s)	1st place, gold medalist(s)				
SCW 2014	2nd place, silver medalist(s)	4th			1st place, gold medalist(s)		
WC 2015	1st place, gold medalist(s)	1st place, gold medalist(s)	1st place, gold medalist(s)		3rd place, bronze medalist(s)		
OG 2016	7th	4th	1st place, gold medalist(s)				
WC 2017	6th	7th	2nd place, silver medalist(s)		3rd place, bronze medalist(s)		2nd place, silver medalist(s)
CG 2018	2nd place, silver medalist(s)	1st place, gold medalist(s)	1st place, gold medalist(s)		1st place, gold medalist(s)		
WC 2019	8th		1st place, gold medalist(s)			2nd place, silver medalist(s)	1st place, gold medalist(s)
OG 2021			1st place, gold medalist(s)				3rd place, bronze medalist(s)
OG 2024			1st place, gold medalist(s)				

== World records ==
=== Long course metres ===
No.	Event	Time	Meet	Location	Date	Status	Ref
1	4x100 m freestyle relay^{[a]}	3:30.98	2014 Commonwealth Games	Glasgow, Scotland	24 July 2014	Former	
2	4x100 m freestyle relay (2)^{[b]}	3:30.65	2016 Summer Olympics	Rio de Janeiro, Brazil	6 August 2016	Former	
3	4x100 m freestyle relay (3)^{[c]}	3:30.05	2018 Commonwealth Games	Gold Coast, Queensland	5 April 2018	Former	
4	4x100 m freestyle relay (4)^{[d]}	3:29.69	2020 Summer Olympics	Tokyo, Japan	25 July 2021	Former	

^{a} split 53.15 (1st leg); with Melanie Schlanger (2nd leg), Emma McKeon (3rd leg), Cate Campbell (4th leg)
^{b} split 52.15 (3rd leg); with Emma McKeon (1st leg), Brittany Elmslie (2nd leg), Cate Campbell (4th leg)
^{c} split 52.99 (2nd leg); with Shayna Jack (1st leg), Emma McKeon (3rd leg), Cate Campbell (4th leg)
^{d} split 53.01 (1st leg); with Meg Harris (2nd leg), Emma McKeon (3rd leg), Cate Campbell (4th leg)

=== Short course metres ===
No.	Event	Time		Meet	Location	Date	Status	Ref
1	4x50 m mixed freestyle relay^{[a]}	1:31.13	h	2013 FINA World Cup	Tokyo, Japan	10 November 2013	Former	
2	4x50 m mixed freestyle relay (2)^{[b]}	1:29.61		2013 FINA World Cup	Tokyo, Japan	10 November 2013	Former	

Legend: OC – Oceanian record; NR – Australian record; e – equalled existing record;
Records not set in finals: h – heat; sf – semifinal; r – relay 1st leg; rh – relay heat 1st leg; b – B final; † – en route to final mark; so – swim-off; tt – time trial

^{a} split 24.03 (3rd leg); with Tomaso D'Orsogna (1st leg), Regan Leong (2nd leg), Cate Campbell (4th leg)
^{b} split 23.44 (4th leg); with Tomaso D'Orsogna (1st leg), Travis Mahoney (2nd leg), Cate Campbell (3rd leg)

== Olympic records ==
=== Long course metres ===
No.	Event	Time		Meet	Location	Date	Status	Notes	Ref
1	4x100 m freestyle relay^{[a]}	3:32.39	h	2016 Summer Olympics	Rio de Janeiro, Brazil	6 August 2016	Former		
2	4x100 m freestyle relay^{[b]}	3:30.65		2016 Summer Olympics	Rio de Janeiro, Brazil	6 August 2016	Former	Former WR, OC, NR	
3	4x100 m freestyle relay^{[c]}	3:29.69		2020 Summer Olympics	Tokyo, Japan	25 July 2021	Former	Former WR, OC, NR	

Legend: WR – World record; OC – Oceanian record; NR – Australian record; e – equalled existing record;
Records not set in finals: h – heat; sf – semifinal; r – relay 1st leg; rh – relay heat 1st leg; b – B final; † – en route to final mark; so – swim-off; tt – time trial

^{a} split 53.26 (3rd leg); with Madison Wilson (1st leg), Brittany Elmslie (2nd leg), Cate Campbell (4th leg)
^{b} split 52.15 (3rd leg); with Emma McKeon (1st leg), Brittany Elmslie (2nd leg), Cate Campbell (4th leg)
^{c} split 53.01 (1st leg); with Meg Harris (2nd leg), Emma McKeon (3rd leg), Cate Campbell (4th leg)

== See also ==
- List of Olympic medalists in swimming (women)
- List of World Aquatics Championships medalists in swimming (women)
- List of Commonwealth Games medallists in swimming (women)
- World record progression 4 × 100 metres freestyle relay

Records
Preceded by Florent Manaudou, Jérémy Stravius, Mélanie Henique, Anna Santamans	Mixed 4 × 50 metres freestyle relay world record-holder 10 November 2013 – 14 December 2013; With: Regan Leong (10 November to 10 November), Tommaso D'Orsogna, Travis Mahoney, Cate Campbell	Succeeded by Sergey Fesikov, Vladimir Morozov, Rozaliya Nasretdinova, Veronika Popova
