= 2014 Pan Pacific Swimming Championships – Women's 4 × 100 metre medley relay =

Women's 4 × 100 metre medley relay at the 2014 Pan Pacific Swimming Championships
- Venue: Gold Coast Aquatic Centre
- Dates: August 24, 2014 (heats & finals)
- Winning time: 3:55.49

Medalists
gold medal	Emily Seebohm, Lorna Tonks, Alicia Coutts and Cate Campbell	Australia
silver medal	Missy Franklin, Jessica Hardy, Kendyl Stewart and Simone Manuel	United States
bronze medal	Brooklynn Snodgrass, Kierra Smith, Katerine Savard and Chantal van Landeghem	Canada

The women's 4 × 100 metre medley relay competition at the 2014 Pan Pacific Swimming Championships took place on August 24 at the Gold Coast Aquatic Centre. The last champion was the United States.

== Records ==
Prior to this competition, the existing world and Pan Pacific records were as follows:

World record	United States (USA); Missy Franklin (58.50); Rebecca Soni (1:04.82); Dana Vollmer (55.48); Allison Schmitt (53.25)	3:52.05	London, UK	August 4, 2012
Pan Pacific Championships record	United States (USA); Natalie Coughlin (59.85); Rebecca Soni (1:05.35); Dana Vollmer (56.91); Jessica Hardy (53.12)	3:55.23	Irvine, United States	August 21, 2010

== Results ==
All times are in minutes and seconds.

KEY:	q	Fastest non-qualifiers	Q	Qualified	CR	Championships record	NR	National record	PB	Personal best	SB	Seasonal best

=== Heats ===
Heats weren't performed, as only seven teams had entered.

=== Final ===
The final was held on August 24, at 21:04.

Rank	Name	Nationality	Time	Notes
1st place, gold medalist(s)	Emily Seebohm (59.44); Lorna Tonks (1:07.44); Alicia Coutts (56.76); Cate Campbell (51.85)	Australia	3:55.49	
2nd place, silver medalist(s)	Missy Franklin (59.99); Jessica Hardy (1:06.35); Kendyl Stewart (57.62); Simone Manuel (53.45)	United States	3:57.41	
3rd place, bronze medalist(s)	Brooklynn Snodgrass (1:00.48); Kierra Smith (1:08.09); Katerine Savard (57.46); Chantal van Landeghem (53.82)	Canada	3:59.85	
4	Sayaka Akase (1:00.87); Kanako Watanabe (1:06.39); Natsumi Hoshi (58.90); Miki Uchida (54.22)	Japan	4:00.38	
5	Etiene Medeiros (1:01.74); Ana Carla Carvalho (1:09.65); Daynara de Paula (59.43); Graciele Herrmann (54.98)	Brazil	4:05.80	
6	Claudia Lau (1:04.28); Yvette Kong (1:10.96); Sze Hang Yu (1:00.51); Camille Cheng (56.33)	Hong Kong	4:12.08	
7	Beatrix Malan (1:06.72); Franko Jonker (1:11.01); Vanessa Mohr (1:03.57); Marce Loubser (1:00.45)	South Africa	4:21.75	
