= 2015 NCAA Division I Women's Swimming and Diving Championships =

American college aquatic sports competition

- Host city: Greensboro, North Carolina
- Date: March 19–21, 2015
- Venue(s): Greensboro Aquatic Center; North Carolina State University

The 2015 NCAA Women's Division I Swimming and Diving Championships were contested March 19–21, 2015 at the 34th annual NCAA-sanctioned swim meet to determine the team and individual national champions of Division I women's collegiate swimming and diving in the United States.

This year's events were hosted by North Carolina State University at the Greensboro Aquatic Center in Greensboro, North Carolina.

California returned to the top of the team standings, finishing 61 points (513–452) ahead of two-time defending champions Georgia. This was the Golden Bears' fourth women's team title.

== Team standings ==
- Note: Top 10 only
- (H) = Hosts
- ^{(DC)} = Defending champions
- Italics = Debut finish in the Top 10
- Full results

Rank	Team	Points
1st place, gold medalist(s)	California	513
2nd place, silver medalist(s)	Georgia ^{(DC)}	452
3rd place, bronze medalist(s)	Stanford	363
4	Texas A&M	231
5	Virginia	229
6	Louisville	197
7	Texas	164
8	USC	163
9	Florida	129
10	Indiana	126
17	NC State (H)	79

== Swimming results ==
Event	Gold		Silver		Bronze	
50 freestyle	Simone Manuel; Stanford	21.32	Ivy Martin; Wisconsin	21.61	Kelsi Worrell; Louisville	21.62
100 freestyle	Simone Manuel; Stanford	46.09; US, AR	Lia Neal; Stanford	47.13	Natalie Hinds; Florida	47.19
200 freestyle	Missy Franklin; California	1:39.10; US, AR	Simone Manuel; Stanford	1:41.41	Lia Neal; Stanford	1:42.65
500 freestyle	Leah Smith; Virginia	4:31.54	Cierra Runge; California	4:33.82	Sarah Henry; Texas A&M	4:34.34
1650 freestyle	Leah Smith; Virginia	15:34.46	Cierra Runge; California	15:46.46	Jess Thielmann; Florida	15:46.68
100 backstroke	Rachel Bootsma; California	50.03	Courtney Bartholomew; Virginia	50.51	Melanie Klaren; California	51.31
200 backstroke	Missy Franklin; California	1:47.91	Courtney Bartholomew; Virginia	1:49.35	Sam Corea; Denver	1:50.87
100 breaststroke	Sarah Haase; Stanford	58.32	Kaylie Burchell; Alabama	58.38	Emma Reaney; Notre Dame	58.43
200 breaststroke	Kierra Smith; Minnesota	2:04.56	Laura Simon; Virginia	2:06.65	Katie Olsen; Stanford	2:07.06
100 butterfly	Kelsi Worrell; Louisville	49.81; US, AR	Sam Corea; Denver	50.86	Kendyl Stewart; USC	50.92
200 butterfly	Kelsi Worrell; Louisville	1:51.11	Christina Bechtel; Kentucky	1:52.08	Hali Flickinger; Georgia	1:52.73
200 IM	Missy Franklin; California	1:52.11	Elizabeth Pelton; California	1:52.80	Madisyn Cox; Texas	1:54.43
400 IM	Sarah Henry; Texas A&M	4:02.47	Hali Flickinger; Georgia	4:02.73	Amber McDermott; Georgia	4:03.34
200 freestyle relay	California; Kaylin Bing (22.36); Missy Franklin (21.28); Rachel Bootsma (21.60); Farida Osman (21.17)	1:26.41	Stanford; Simone Manuel (21.68); Lia Neal (21.34); Janet Hu (21.59); Ally Howe (21.91)	1:26.52	Georgia; Madeline Locus (22.05); Chantal Van Landeghem (21.42); Olivia Smoliga (21.61); Lauren Harrington (21.85)	1:26.93
400 freestyle relay	Stanford; Lia Neal (46.84); Janet Hu (47.98); Lindsey Engel (47.93); Simone Manuel (45.79)	3:08.54; US, AR	California; Missy Franklin (46.66); Rachel Bootsma (47.39); Camille Cheng (48.21); Farida Osman (47.50)	3:09.76	Georgia; Madeline Locus (48.23); Olivia Smoliga (47.66); Lauren Harrington (48.35); Chantal Van Landeghem (47.84)	3:12.08
800 freestyle relay	California; Cierra Runge (1:44.56); Camille Cheng (1:43.69); Elizabeth Pelton (1:42.69); Missy Franklin (1:40.05)	6:50.99	Stanford; Lia Neal (1:42.89); Grace Carlson (1:46.00); Simone Manuel (1:41.61); Nicole Stafford (1:44.18)	6:54.68	Georgia; Jordan Mattern (1:44.85); Amber McDermott (1:45.73); Brittany MacLean (1:45.84); Hali Flickinger (1:43.97)	7:00.39
200 medley relay	California; Rachel Bootsma (23.39); Marina García Urzainqui (27.46); Noemie Thomas (23.21); Farida Osman (21.09)	1:35.15	Louisville; Tanja Kyllianinen (24.81); Andrea Cottrell (26.55); Kelsi Worrell (21.96); Andrea Kneppers (22.43)	3:27.58	Tennessee; Amanda Carner (25.12); Molly Hannis (26.42); Harper Bruens (22.98); Faith Johnson (21.77)	1:36.29
400 medley relay	Stanford; Ally Howe (52.00); Katie Olsen (58.02); Janet Hu (50.89); Simone Manuel (45.45)	3:26.41; US, AR	Virginia; Courtney Bartholomew (50.91); Laura Simon (57.52); Ellen Williamson (51.02); Ellen Thomas (47.69)	3:26.42	California; Rachel Bootsma (50.84); Marina García Urzainqui (59.28); Farida Osman (51.07); Missy Franklin (45.98)	3:27.17

Legend: US – U.S. Open record; AR – American record;

== Diving Results ==
Event	Gold		Silver		Bronze	
1 m diving	Samantha Pickens; Arizona	345.90	Kassidy Cook; Stanford	340.20	Yu Zhou; Minnesota	338.00
3 m diving	Yu Zhou; Minnesota	410.25	Pei Lin; Miami (OH)	409.70	Kassidy Cook; Stanford	393.25
Platform diving	Jessica Parratto; Indiana	367.00	Haley Ishimatsu; Minnesota	339.65	Cheyenne Cousineau; Miami (FL)	318.05

== See also ==
- List of college swimming and diving teams
