= Swimming at the 2010 Commonwealth Games – Women's 4 × 100 metre medley relay =

The Women's 4 × 100 metre medley relay event at the 2010 Commonwealth Games took place on 9 October 2010, at the SPM Swimming Pool Complex.

There were just eight teams, so all teams made the final and only one race was swum.

== Final ==
| Rank | Lane | Names | Time | Notes |
|---|---|---|---|---|
| 1st place, gold medalist(s) | 4 | Australia; Emily Seebohm (59.53); Leisel Jones (1:05.41); Jessicah Schipper (58.18); Alicia Coutts (53.87) | 3:56.99 | |
| 2nd place, silver medalist(s) | 5 | England; Gemma Spofforth (59.83); Kate Haywood (1:08.43); Ellen Gandy (57.41); Francesca Halsall (54.42) | 4:00.09 | |
| 3rd place, bronze medalist(s) | 3 | Canada; Julia Wilkinson (1:01.63); Annamay Pierse (1:08.13); Audrey Lacroix (59.69); Victoria Poon (54.51) | 4:03.96 | |
| 4 | 6 | Wales; Georgia Davies (1:00.92); Sara Lougher (1:10.85); Jemma Lowe (58.09); Jazmin Carlin (56.02) | 4:05.88 | |
| 5 | 2 | Scotland; Hannah Miley (1:04.15); Kathryn Johnstone (1:10.57); Louise Pate (1:00.24); Caitlin McClatchey (56.57) | 4:11.53 | |
| 6 | 1 | Northern Ireland; Melanie Nocher (1:03.49); Sycerika McMahon (1:13.78); Bethany Carson (1:03.22); Clare Dawson (57.98) | 4:18.47 | |
| 7 | 7 | Malaysia; Kah Chan (1:05.37); Yen Loh (1:13.25); Cai Khoo (1:06.79); Lai Chui (57.99) | 4:23.40 | |
| 8 | 8 | India; Jyotsna Pansare (1:09.36); Poorva Shetye (1:21.30); Pooja Alva (1:05.93); Talasha Prabhu (1:01.38) | 4:37.97 | |
