= Emma Reaney =

American swimmer (born 1992)

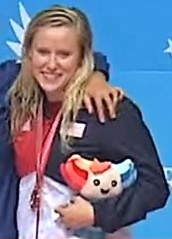
- Reaney receives bronze medal at the 2015 Summer Universiade in Gwangju

Personal information
- National team: United States
- Born: October 20, 1992 (age 34) Lawrence, Kansas, US
- Height: 5 ft 11 in (180 cm)

Sport
- Sport: Swimming
- Strokes: Breaststroke, individual medley
- College team: University of Notre Dame
Medal record
Women's swimming
Representing United States
World Championships (SC)
Silver medal – second place	2014 Doha	4×50 m medley
Universiade
Bronze medal – third place	2015 Gwangju	50 m breaststroke
Bronze medal – third place	2015 Gwangju	4×100 m medley
Representing Notre Dame Fighting Irish/Atlantic Coast Conference
NCAA Championships
Gold medal – first place	2014 Minneapolis	200 y breasttroke
Bronze medal – third place	2014 Minneapolis	100 y breaststroke
Bronze medal – third place	2015 Greensboro	100 y breaststroke
By race
Event	1st	2nd	3rd
100 y breaststroke	0	0	2
200 y breasttroke	1	0	0
Total	1	0	2
By year
Event	1st	2nd	3rd
2014 Minneapolis	1	0	1
2015 Greensboro	0	0	1
Total	1	0	2

Emma Reaney (born October 20, 1992) is a former competition breaststroke and individual medley swimmer and current swim coach. She is an eight-time All-American (all in individual events) and five-time All-American honorable mention (4 individual and 1 relay). She medaled for Team USA at the 2014 FINA World Swimming Championships (25 m) (silver, 200m medley relay) and the 2015 Summer Universiade (bronze, 50m breaststroke and 4 × 100 m medley). She has set American records in both the 200-yard breaststroke and the 4x50 meter medley relay. As of 2021, Reaney still held 4 Notre Dame swimming event records.

== Early life ==
Reaney was born to Mark and Ann Reaney in Lawrence, Kansas. Reaney competed for the Lawrence Aquahawks swim club when she was a young child. She attended Lawrence High School in Lawrence, Kansas. At age 15 she competed in the 200 meter individual medley at the 2008 United States Olympic Trials (finishing 73rd).

== College career ==
As a freshman, Reaney became the first swimmer to receive three Big East Women's Swimming and Diving Athlete of the Week honors in a single season. At the 2012 Big East Championships Reaney won the 100 yard breaststroke and 200 yard IM and was a member of the 400 yard medley relay and 400 yard freestyle relay champions. She earned three NCAA All-American honorable mentions (100 yard breaststroke, 11th; 200 yard breaststroke, 14th and 200 yard IM, 9th).

As a sophomore, Reaney again received three Big East Women's Swimming and Diving Athlete of the Week honors in a single season. On January 16, 2013, Reaney was named Counsilman Hunsaker CollegeSwimming.com National Division I Women's Swimmer of the Week when she broke Rebecca Soni's Rolfs Aquatic Center pool records in the 100 and 200 breaststroke that were set on October 19, 2007. At the 2013 Big East Championships Reaney won the 100 and 200 yard breaststrokes and 200 yard IM and was a member of the 200 yard medley relay, 400 yard medley relay and 800 yard freestyle relay champions. She was recognized as the 2013 Big East Championship Meet Most Outstanding Swimmer. She earned 2 All-American selections (100 yard breaststroke, 5th; 200 yard breaststroke, 5th) and an All-American honorable mention (200 yard IM, 9th; 400 yard medley, 13th). During the offseason, she had a breakout meet at the 2013 U.S. Open as the top American in the 100 and 200 breaststrokes and the winner of the 200 IM. Her 100- and 200-meter breast times of 1:07.56 and 2:26.65, respectively, placed Reaney on the 2013–2014 US National Team.

During her junior season, Reaney earned ACC Women's Swimmer of the Week recognition 5 times. At the 2014 ACC Women's Swimming and Diving Championship, Reaney won three gold medals (all in league record time). She won the 100 and 200 yard breaststrokes as well as the 200 individual medley, earning ACC Championship Most Valuable Swimmer recognition. Following the Championship, she earned Women's Division I Phillip Hunsaker CollegeSwimming.com Swimmer of the Week recognition and Speedo Performance of the Week recognition. She won the 200 yard breaststroke at the 2014 NCAA Division I Women's Swimming and Diving Championships, becoming Notre Dame's first national champion swimmer. She earned 2014 All American scrolls (200 yard breaststroke, 1st; 100 yard breaststroke, 3rd; 200 yard IM, 7th) Her 200-yard time of 2:04.06 broke her own American, NCAA, ACC, Notre Dame and U.S. Open records and surpassed Caitlin Leverenz' NCAA Championships record time of 2:04.76 (2012). She had first set these records at the 2014 ACC Championships with a 2:04.36 time where she also won ACC titles in the 100 yard breaststroke and the 200 yard IM. She surpassed Breeja Larson's American record of 2:04.48 (which had eclipsed two-time defending 200 meter breastroke Olympic gold medalist Rebecca Soni's 2009 American record of 2:04.75). She was the first person to hold an American record while a student at Notre Dame. Along with men's fencer Gerek Meinhardt and female fencer Lee Kiefer, Reaney was part of the 2nd Notre Dame trio to be named individual national champion in a single year and the 4th to be either individual national champion or national athlete of the year in a single year. Many of Reaney's records were broken in one fell swoop by Indiana University's Lilly King at the 2016 NCAA championships. However, Reaney's ACC record survived until 2021 when University of Virginia's Kate Douglass bested it, and her ACC Championship meet record survived until Virginia's Alexandra Walsh eclipsed it at the 2022 ACC Championships. Following the season, Reaney was named ACC Women's Swimmer of the Year. She also earned ACC Women's Swimming & Diving Scholar-Athlete of the Year recognition. Reaney was one of four swimmers on the Capital One Academic All-America Division I At-Large First Team along with Kim Jacob of the University of Alabama, Elizabeth Beisel of University of Florida, and Maya DiRado of Stanford University as well as diver Laura Ryan of the University of Georgia.

Prior to her senior year, head coach Brian Barnes, who resigned abruptly, was replaced by Tim Welsh. As a senior, Reaney won the 100 yard breaststroke at the 2015 ACC Championships. She earned 3 additional All-American recognitions (100 yard breaststroke, 3rd; 200 yard breaststroke, 4th and 200 yard IM, 4th). She was named to the Capital One Academic All-America At-Large Division I Second Team.

Entering the 2021–22 season, Reaney was the holder of the four oldest school swimming records (all set in 2014): 57.79, 100 yard breaststroke; 2:04.06, 200 yard breaststroke; 1:54.92, 200 yard individual medley; and 4:08.63, 400 yard individual medley. Reaney's 100 breaststroke time of 57.79 stood as the ACC record until Sophie Hansson posted 57.74 on February 22, 2019. Reaney's 2014 ACC Championships 100 yard breaststroke record time of 58.46 was surpassed by Andrea Cottrell's 2016 time of 58.26. Her 2014 ACC Championships 200 IM record time of 1:54.92 was surpassed in 2017 by Alexia Zevnik's time of 1:54.44.

== International competition ==
Reaney entered the 2008 United States Olympic trials and placed 73rd out of 106 in the 200 IM with a time of 2:20.19. She went into the 2012 United States Olympic trials seeded 42nd in the 200 Individual medley, but finished 9th in the prelims with a personal record of 2:14.79 and 13th in the semifinals in 2:15.51. She also competed in the 200 breaststroke. Reaney made the Team USA rosters for 2013–14 and 2014–15.

On July 10, 2015, she finished behind Mariya Liver and Fiona Doyle in a bronze medal tie with Martina Carraro in the 50 meter breaststroke at the World University games. In November 2015, Reaney shattered the top knuckle of her index finger with a 40 pounds (18.1 kg) dumbbell in a training accident. By the time of the 2016 United States Olympic trials, Reaney had endured a period with 5 coaches in 2 years. Reaney participated in 4 events (100- & 200-meter breaststroke, 100-meter butterfly and 200-meter individual medley) at the 2016 trials, but did not reach the finals of any. Her final career event before retiring was the semifinals of the Women's 200 Meter Long Course Breaststroke at the trials. She finished 9th, making her first alternate for the 8-person finals in the event.

== Professional career ==
After retiring from competitive swimming in 2016, Reaney initially spent time as an au pair in Australia. She began her coaching career at St. Francis College for the 2021 season as an assistant coach. She then was hired by New York University in August 2021 to serve as an assistant coach.
