= Elizabeth Pelton =

American swimmer (born 1993)

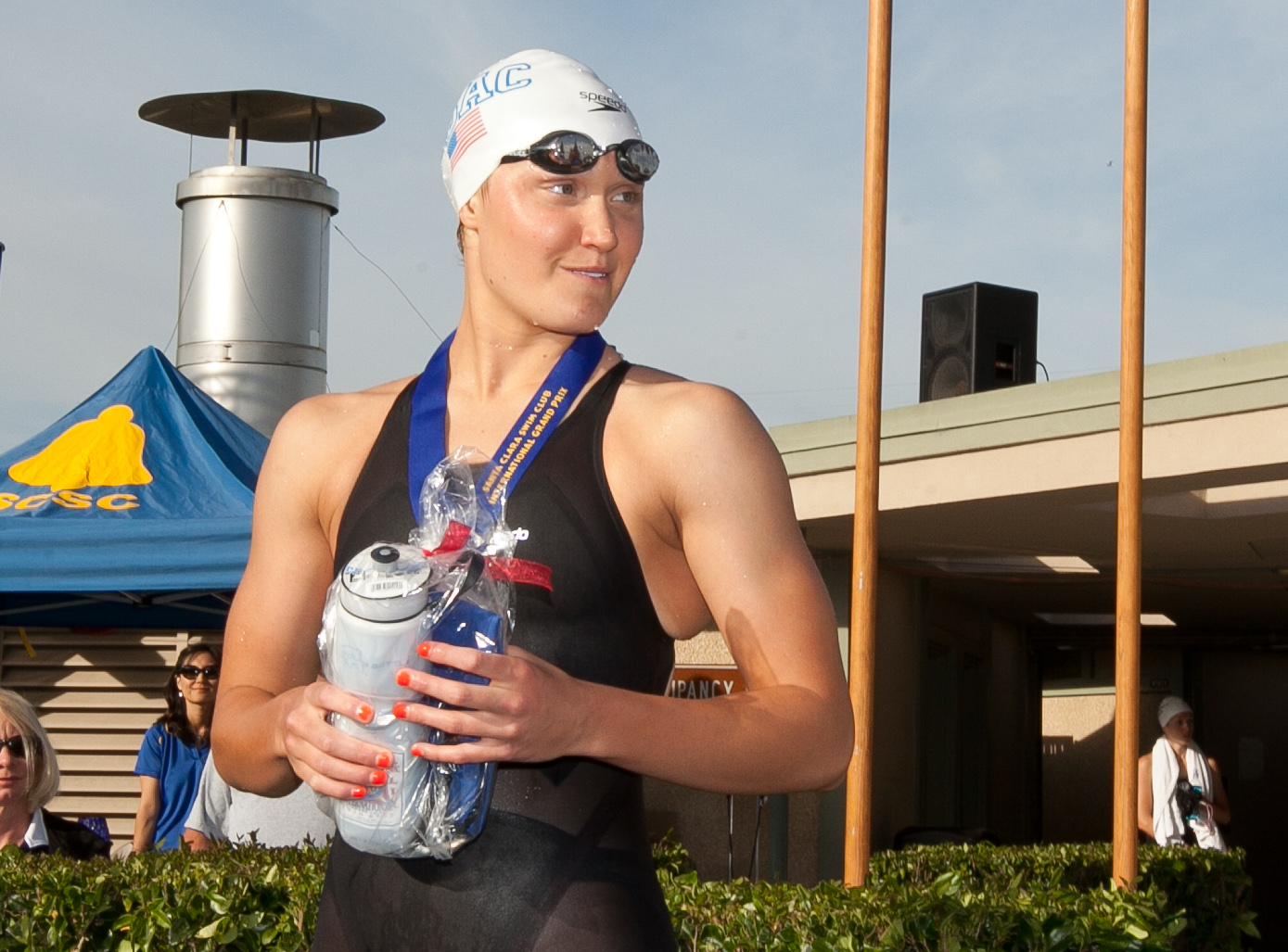
- Pelton in 2011

Personal information
- Full name: Elizabeth Anne Pelton
- Nickname: "Liz"
- National team: United States
- Born: November 26, 1993 (age 32) Fairfield, Connecticut, U.S.
- Height: 5 ft 10 in (178 cm)

Sport
- Sport: Swimming
- Strokes: Backstroke, medley
- Club: North Baltimore Aquatics Club; T2 Aquatics Swim Club; Wilton Y Wahoos
- College team: University of California, Berkeley
Medal record
Women's swimming
Representing the United States
World Championships (LC)
Gold medal – first place	2011 Shanghai	4×100 m medley
Gold medal – first place	2013 Barcelona	4×100 m freestyle
Gold medal – first place	2013 Barcelona	4×100 m medley
Pan American Games
Gold medal – first place	2011 Guadalajara	200 m backstroke
Gold medal – first place	2011 Guadalajara	4×100 m freestyle
Gold medal – first place	2011 Guadalajara	4×200 m freestyle
Gold medal – first place	2011 Guadalajara	4×100 m medley
Silver medal – second place	2011 Guadalajara	100 m backstroke
Pan Pacific Championships
Silver medal – second place	2010 Irvine	200 m backstroke
Summer Universiade
Silver medal – second place	2015 Gwangju	100 m backstroke

Elizabeth Anne Pelton (born November 26, 1993) is a former American competitive swimmer, multi FINA world champion, multi NCAA Champion, and 4x former American Record holder. Pelton also secured NCAA Swimmer of the Year, NCAA Swimmer of the Meet, Pac-12 Swimmer of the Year, Pac-12 Freshman of the Year and Pac-12 Swimmer of the Meet honors her freshman year of college.

== Personal ==
Pelton is an American swimmer and multiple FINA World Champion. She has been competing since 2009, aged 15. Pelton grew up in Fairfield, Connecticut and swam for the Wilton Wahoos before moving to swim at Badger Swim Club in Larchmont, New York. In 2006, Pelton moved to Baltimore to swim with North Baltimore Aquatic Club. Pelton trained at the T2 Aquatics Swim Club in 2012 in Naples, Florida.

After 2012, Pelton began her college career at the University of California Berkeley.

Pelton announced her retirement from swimming at the 2016 Swimming Olympic Trials in Omaha, Nebraska. Pelton is a student at UC Berkeley.

== High school ==
At the 2009 U.S. Nationals and World Championship Trials, Pelton placed second in the 100-meter backstroke, 200-meter backstroke, and 200-meter individual medley, earning berths on the U.S. national team for the 2009 World Aquatics Championships in Rome. Pelton opted not to compete in the 200-meter individual medley in Rome because of a scheduling conflict with the 100-meter backstroke and was replaced by Ariana Kukors for the event. Pelton also opted to swim the 50-meter backstroke at the World Championships.

At the 2009 FINA World Championships, Pelton placed sixth in the 200-meter backstroke (2:08.04), 13th in the 100-meter backstroke (1:00.51), and 22nd in the 50-meter backstroke (28.86). Additionally, Pelton swam the backstroke leg of the 4x100-meter medley relay preliminaries.

== College ==
Pelton attended the University of California, Berkeley, where she joined the California Golden Bears swimming team in 2012. In her first season at Cal, she set the American record in the 200-yard backstroke, then bested her own record again at 2013 Pac-12 Conference championships (1:48.39), then breaking the national, U.S. open record at the 2013 NCAAs with 1:47.84.

Pelton had an outstanding freshman season for the Bears, earning 2013 NCAA Swimmer of the Year, NCAA Swimmer of the Meet, Pac-12 Swimmer of the Year, Pac-12 Freshman of the Year and Pac-12 Swimmer of the Meet honors. In 2014, at the Pac-12 meet, earned conference titles in the 200 back (1:52.18) and on the 800 free relay; also third in the 200 IM (1:55.65) and sixth in the 200 free (1:45.12). At 2014 NCAA Championships, she was a member of Cal's NCAA champion 800 free relay at the 2014 meet; also was the NCAA runner-up in the 200 back (1:50.55), fourth in the 200 IM (1:54.80) and 12th in the 200 free (1:44.59). In 2015, her junior year, placed second in the 200 IM (1:53.80), fifth in the 200 free (1:43.44) and second in the 200 back (1:50.27). At the NCAA Championships meet, she helped the 800 free relay set an American record at the 2015 Pac-12 Championships with a time of 6:50.18, and was 2015 NCAA runner-up to Missy Franklin in the 200 IM (1:52.80); tied for fifth in the 100 back (51.67) and placed seventh in the 200 back (1:52.08). In 2016, her senior year, Pelton was Team Captain, helping the Bears place 3rd overall at the NCAA Championships in Atlanta, GA.

School record-holder in the 200 back (1:47.84); top 10 in Cal Berkeley history in: 200 free (3rd, 1:42.13), 200 IM (3rd, 1:52.80), 400 IM (6th, 4:09.89), 100 back (4th, 51.26) and 100 free (6th, 47.78)

== National success ==
At the 2014 Phillips 66 National Championships, placed third in the 100m back (1:00.76), fifth in the 200 back (2:11.99) and fifth in the 50m back (28.85), qualifying for the Pan Pacific team.

Finished second to Cal teammate Missy Franklin in both the 100 back (59.27) and 200 back (2:06.29) at the 2013 U.S. National Championships; also placed sixth in the 100m free in 54.65.

At the 2011 ConocoPhillips National Championships, won a silver in the 200m backstroke and a silver in the 800m freestyle relay.

== International career ==
Pelton earned a silver medal in the 100m back at the 2015 World University Games in South Korea (1:00.65), a bronze medal in the finals relay for the U.S. 400m medley relay and placed ninth in the 50m backstroke. She competed in two individual events at the 2014 Pan Pacific Championships in Australia, finishing in seventh place in the 100m back (1:01.37) and ninth in the 200m back (2:09.95).

Pelton captured gold medals as a member of the 400m medley relay and 400m free relay at the 2013 World Championships in Barcelona, where she also placed fourth in the 100m back (59.45) and fifth in the 200m back (2:08.98). She won a gold medal in the 400m medley relay at the 2011 World Championships, swimming the backstroke lead off leg. At the 2009 World Championships, placed sixth in the 200m back (2:08.04), 13th in the 100m back (1:00.51) and 22nd in the 50m back. Pelton was qualified to compete in the 200 IM but opted out due to a scheduling conflict with the 100m back. At the 2011 Pan American Games, Pelton won a silver in the 100m back and gold in the 200m back. Pelton was awarded a silver medal in the 200m back in the 2010 Pan Pacific Championships. She also was a member of the USA's 2009 and 2011 Duel in the Pool teams.

== Personal bests (long course) ==
As of June 28, 2013.

Event	Time	Date
50m backstroke	28.86	July 29, 2009
100m backstroke	59.27	June 28, 2013
200m backstroke	2:06.29	June 26, 2013

== See also ==
- List of World Aquatics Championships medalists in swimming (women)
