= 2014 Pan Pacific Swimming Championships – Women's 50 metre freestyle =

Women's 50 metre freestyle at the 2014 Pan Pacific Swimming Championships
- Venue: Gold Coast Aquatic Centre
- Dates: August 24, 2014 (heats & finals)
- Competitors: 34
- Winning time: 23.96

Medalists
gold medal	Cate Campbell	Australia
silver medal	Bronte Campbell	Australia
bronze medal	Chantal van Landeghem	Canada

The women's 50 metre freestyle competition at the 2014 Pan Pacific Swimming Championships took place on August 24 at the Gold Coast Aquatic Centre. The last champion was Jessica Hardy of US.

This race consisted of one length of the pool in freestyle.

== Records ==
Prior to this competition, the existing world and Pan Pacific records were as follows:

World record	Britta Steffen (GER)	23.73	Rome, Italy	August 2, 2009
Pan Pacific Championships record	Jessica Hardy (USA)	24.63	Irvine, United States	August 21, 2010

== Results ==
All times are in minutes and seconds.

KEY:	q	Fastest non-qualifiers	Q	Qualified	CR	Championships record	NR	National record	PB	Personal best	SB	Seasonal best

=== Heats ===
The first round was held on August 24, at 11:07.

Rank	Name	Nationality	Time	Notes
1	Cate Campbell	Australia	24.35	QA, CR
2	Bronte Campbell	Australia	24.67	QA
3	Melanie Schlanger	Australia	24.87	QA
4	Simone Manuel	United States	24.97	QA
5	Etiene Medeiros	Brazil	24.99	QA
6	Graciele Herrmann	Brazil	25.01	QA
7	Ivy Martin	United States	25.18	QA
8	Madeline Locus	United States	25.20	QA
9	Chantal van Landeghem	Canada	25.22	QB
10	Brittany Elmslie	Australia	25.23	QB
11	Abbey Weitzeil	United States	25.24	QB
12	Jessica Hardy	United States	25.37	QB
13	Alessandra Marchioro	Brazil	25.48	QB
14	Michelle Williams	Canada	25.54	QB
15	Katie McLaughlin	United States	25.60	QB
16	Misaki Yamaguchi	Japan	25.68	QB
16	Miki Uchida	Japan	25.68	
18	Victoria Poon	Canada	25.80	
19	Daynara de Paula	Brazil	25.85	
20	Sandrine Mainville	Canada	25.88	
20	Madeline Groves	Australia	25.88	
22	Bronte Barratt	Australia	26.00	
23	Laura Quilter	New Zealand	26.01	
24	Yayoi Matsumoto	Japan	26.03	
25	Carolina Bergamaschi	Brazil	26.15	
26	Rachel Bootsma	United States	26.42	
27	Yasuko Miyamoto	Japan	26.47	
28	Sze Hang Yu	Hong Kong	26.57	
29	Claire Donahue	United States	26.61	
30	Zhang Jiaqi	China	26.72	
31	Yin Fan	China	26.80	
32	Sayaka Akase	Japan	27.10	
33	Alanna Bowles	Australia	27.56	
34	Marce Loubser	South Africa	28.04	

=== B Final ===
The B final was held on August 24, at 20:24.

Rank	Name	Nationality	Time	Notes
9	Melanie Schlanger	Australia	25.23	
10	Madeline Locus	United States	25.24	
11	Alessandra Marchioro	Brazil	25.37	
12	Miki Uchida	Japan	25.56	
13	Victoria Poon	Canada	25.69	
14	Misaki Yamaguchi	Japan	25.70	
15	Laura Quilter	New Zealand	26.10	
16	Yayoi Matsumoto	Japan	26.35	

=== A Final ===
The A final was held on August 24, at 20:24.

Rank	Name	Nationality	Time	Notes
1st place, gold medalist(s)	Cate Campbell	Australia	23.96	CR
2nd place, silver medalist(s)	Bronte Campbell	Australia	24.56	
3rd place, bronze medalist(s)	Chantal van Landeghem	Canada	24.69	
4	Simone Manuel	United States	24.70	
5	Graciele Herrmann	Brazil	24.78	
6	Etiene Medeiros	Brazil	25.07	
7	Ivy Martin	United States	25.18	
8	Michelle Williams	Canada	25.64	
