= Lorrane Ferreira =

Brazilian swimmer (born 1993)

Personal information
- Full name: Lorrane Cristina Versiani Ferreira
- Born: March 17, 1993 (age 33) Belo Horizonte, Minas Gerais, Brazil
- Height: 1.83 m (6 ft 0 in)
- Weight: 62 kg (137 lb)

Sport
- Sport: Swimming
- Strokes: Freestyle
- Club: Esporte Clube Pinheiros
Medal record
Women's swimming
Representing Brazil
Pan American Games
Gold medal – first place	2023 Santiago	4×100 m mixed free
Silver medal – second place	2019 Lima	4×100 m mixed freestyle
Bronze medal – third place	2023 Santiago	4×100 m freestyle
South American Games
Gold medal – first place	2022 Asunción	50 m freestyle

Lorrane Cristina Versiani Ferreira (born March 17, 1993, in Belo Horizonte) is a Brazilian swimmer.

== International career ==
At the 2018 Pan Pacific Swimming Championships in Tokyo, Japan, she finished 12th in the Women's 50 metre freestyle, and 27th in the Women's 100 metre freestyle.

At the 2019 Pan American Games held in Lima, Peru, she won a silver medal in the Mixed 4 × 100 metre freestyle relay, by participating at heats. She also finished 4th in the Women's 50 metre freestyle.
