= 2014 FINA World Swimming Championships (25 m) =

2014 swimming competition in Qatar

Coordinates: 25°15′49″N 51°26′36″E

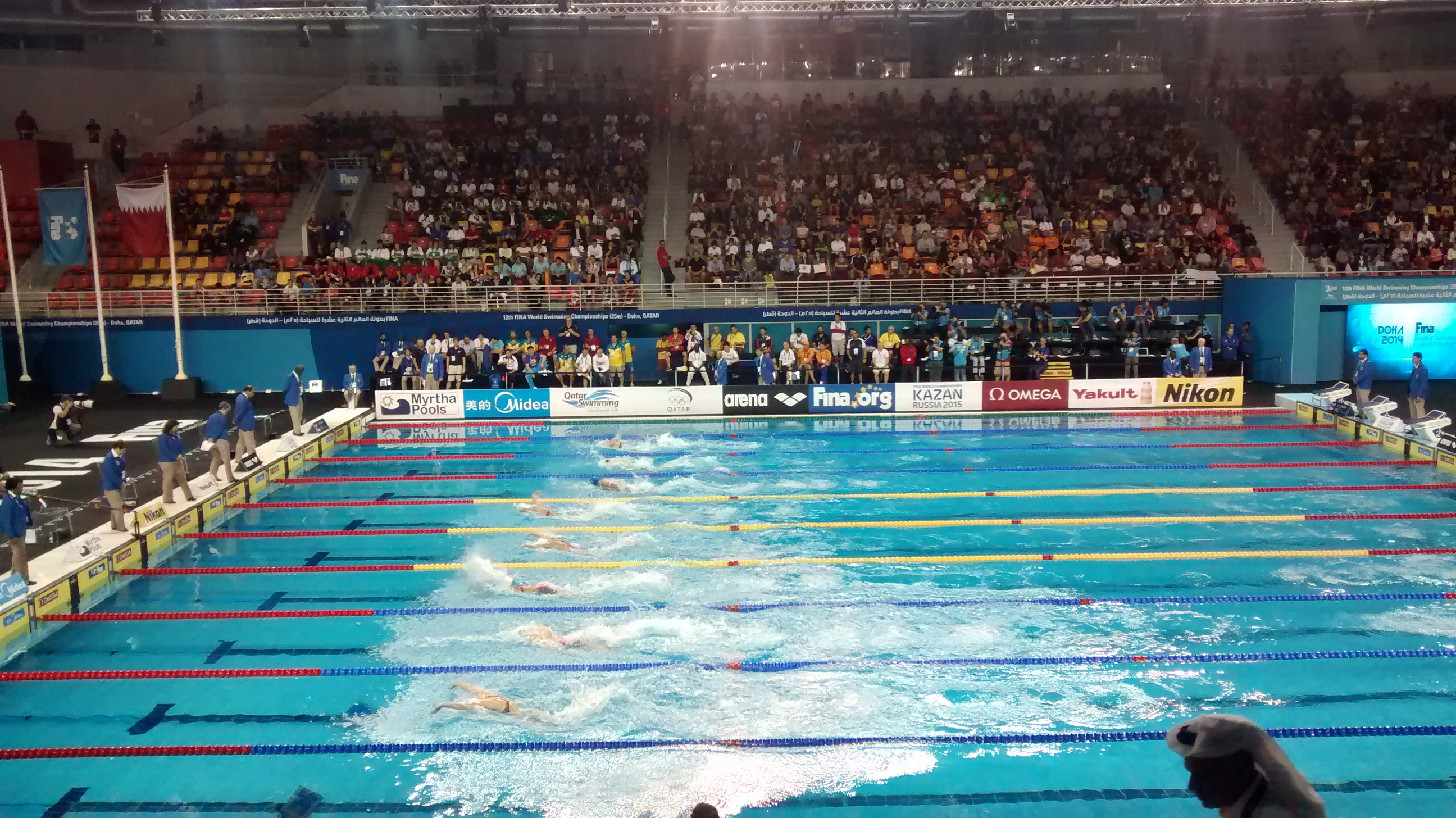
- Host city: Doha, Qatar
- Date: 3–7 December 2014
- Venue: Hamad Aquatic Centre
- Nations: 174
- Athletes: 968
- Events: 46

The 12th FINA World Swimming Championships (25m) were held in Doha, Qatar on 3–7 December 2014. The Hamad Aquatic Centre in the Aspire Zone hosted the event.

== Host selection ==
On 14 December 2010, FINA announced that Catania, Italy would host the 2014 Short Course Worlds.

In November 2011, the Italian Swimming Federation (FIN) withdrew their support of Catania as host for the event, due to the Italian regional government's missing deadlines related to financial guarantees for the event. FIN's withdrawal of support for Catania made it unlikely that the event would stay in Italy.

On 4 April 2012, the FINA Bureau announced that Doha, Qatar would host the event.

== Schedule ==
46 events are going to be held.

H	Heats	SF	Semifinals	(gold)	Finals

Morning session	09:30	Evening session	18:00

Men
Event	December									
Event	3		4		5		6		7	
50 m freestyle			H	SF		1st place, gold medalist(s)				
100 m freestyle							H	SF		1st place, gold medalist(s)
200 m freestyle	H	1st place, gold medalist(s)								
400 m freestyle					H	1st place, gold medalist(s)				
1500 m freestyle									1st place, gold medalist(s)	
50 m backstroke					H	SF		1st place, gold medalist(s)		
100 m backstroke	H	SF		1st place, gold medalist(s)						
200 m backstroke									H	1st place, gold medalist(s)
50 m breaststroke							H	SF		1st place, gold medalist(s)
100 m breaststroke	H	SF		1st place, gold medalist(s)						
200 m breaststroke					H	1st place, gold medalist(s)				
50 m butterfly					H	SF		1st place, gold medalist(s)		
100 m butterfly	H	SF		1st place, gold medalist(s)						
200 m butterfly									H	1st place, gold medalist(s)
100 m individual medley							H	SF		1st place, gold medalist(s)
200 m individual medley					H	1st place, gold medalist(s)				
400 m individual medley			H	1st place, gold medalist(s)						
4 × 50 m freestyle							H	1st place, gold medalist(s)		
4 × 100 m freestyle	H	1st place, gold medalist(s)								
4 × 200 m freestyle			H	1st place, gold medalist(s)						
4 × 50 m medlay relay			H	1st place, gold medalist(s)						
4 × 100 m medlay relay									H	1st place, gold medalist(s)
Total	2		6		4		3		7	

Women
Event	December									
Event	3		4		5		6		7	
50 m freestyle							H	SF		1st place, gold medalist(s)
100 m freestyle			H	SF		1st place, gold medalist(s)				
200 m freestyle									H	1st place, gold medalist(s)
400 m freestyle					H	1st place, gold medalist(s)				
800 m freestyle			1st place, gold medalist(s)							
50 m backstroke							H	SF		1st place, gold medalist(s)
100 m backstroke	H	SF		1st place, gold medalist(s)						
200 m backstroke					H	1st place, gold medalist(s)				
50 m breaststroke	H	SF		1st place, gold medalist(s)						
100 m breaststroke					H	SF		1st place, gold medalist(s)		
200 m breaststroke									H	1st place, gold medalist(s)
50 m butterfly			H	SF		1st place, gold medalist(s)				
100 m butterfly							H	SF		1st place, gold medalist(s)
200 m butterfly	H	1st place, gold medalist(s)								
100 m individual medley			H	SF		1st place, gold medalist(s)				
200 m individual medley							H	1st place, gold medalist(s)		
400 m individual medley	H	1st place, gold medalist(s)								
4 × 50 m freestyle									H	1st place, gold medalist(s)
4 × 100 m freestyle					H	1st place, gold medalist(s)				
4 × 200 m freestyle	H	1st place, gold medalist(s)								
4 × 50 m medlay relay					H	1st place, gold medalist(s)				
4 × 100 m medlay relay									H	1st place, gold medalist(s)
Total	3		3		7		2		7	

Mixed
Event	December						
Event	3	4		5	6		7
4 × 50 m freestyle relay					H	1st place, gold medalist(s)	
4 × 50 m medley relay		H	1st place, gold medalist(s)				
Total		1			1		

== Records broken ==
During the competition, a total of 23 world records were set, including 7 men's records and 15 women's records. A mixed relay (including men and women) world record was also broken. Hungarian swimmer Katinka Hosszú accounted for the most world records with 4.

Broken World records
Event	Date	Round	Name	Nationality	Time	Day
Women's 4 × 200 metre freestyle relay (record progression)	3 December	Final	Inge Dekker (1:54.73); Femke Heemskerk (1:51.22); Ranomi Kromowidjojo (1:54.17); Sharon van Rouwendaal (1:52.73)	Netherlands	7:32.85	1
Women's 400 metre individual medley (record progression)	3 December	Final	Mireia Belmonte	Spain	4:19.86	1
Women's 200 metre butterfly (record progression)	3 December	Final	Mireia Belmonte	Spain	1:59.61	1
Men's 4 × 50 metre medley relay (record progression)	4 December	Final	Guilherme Guido (23.42); Felipe França Silva (25.33); Nicholas Santos (21.68); César Cielo (20.08)	Brazil	1:30.51	2
Women's 4 × 100 metre freestyle relay (record progression)	5 December	Final	Inge Dekker (52.39); Femke Heemskerk (50.58); Maud van der Meer (52.55); Ranomi Kromowidjojo (51.01)	Netherlands	3:26.53	3
Men's 50 metre freestyle (record progression)	5 December	Final	Florent Manaudou	France	20:26	3
Women's 4 × 50 metre freestyle relay (record progression)	7 December	Heats	Esmee Vermeulen (25.09); Ranomi Kromowidjojo (23.01); Maud van der Meer (23.89); Inge Dekker (23.75)	Netherlands	1:35.74	5
Women's 4 × 50 metre freestyle relay (record progression)	7 December	Final	Inge Dekker (24.09); Femke Heemskerk (23.24); Maud van der Meer (24.03); Ranomi Kromowidjojo (22.88)	Netherlands	1:34.24	5

== Medal summary ==
Rank	Nation	Gold	Silver	Bronze	Total
1	Brazil	7	1	2	10
2	Hungary	6	3	2	11
3	Netherlands	5	1	6	12
4	South Africa	4	1	1	6
5	Spain	4	0	0	4
6	Japan	3	3	4	10
7	France	3	2	3	8
8	Sweden	3	1	0	4
9	United States	2	9	6	17
10	Denmark	2	1	3	6
11	Australia	1	5	4	10
12	Russia	1	4	3	8
13	Italy	1	2	3	6
14	Germany	1	1	2	4
15	Poland	1	1	1	3
16	Jamaica	1	1	0	2
16	Lithuania	1	1	0	2
18	Great Britain	0	7	1	8
19	China	0	2	1	3
20	Tunisia	0	1	0	1
21	Ukraine	0	0	2	2
22	Canada	0	0	1	1
22	Serbia	0	0	1	1
Totals (23 entries)		46	47	46	139

== Results ==
=== Men's events ===
Event	Gold		Silver		Bronze	
Freestyle
50 m freestyle	Florent Manaudou; France	20.26 WR	Marco Orsi; Italy	20.69	César Cielo; Brazil	20.88
100 m freestyle	César Cielo; Brazil	45.75	Florent Manaudou; France	45.81	Danila Izotov; Russia	46.09
200 m freestyle	Chad le Clos; South Africa	1:41.45	Danila Izotov; Russia	1:41.67	Ryan Lochte; United States	1:42.09
400 m freestyle	Péter Bernek; Hungary	3:34.32 CR	James Guy (United Kingdom) Great Britain	3:36.35	Velimir Stjepanović; Serbia	3:38.17 NR
1500 m freestyle	Gregorio Paltrinieri; Italy	14:16.10 CR, ER	Oussama Mellouli; Tunisia	14:18.79 AF	Ryan Cochrane; Canada	14:23.35 AM
Backstroke
50 m backstroke	Florent Manaudou; France	22.22 WR	Eugene Godsoe; United States	23.05	Stanislav Donets; Russia	23.10
100 m backstroke	Mitch Larkin; Australia	49.57	Radosław Kawęcki; Poland	50.11	Ryosuke Irie; Japan and Matt Grevers; United States	50.12
200 m backstroke	Radosław Kawęcki; Poland	1:47.38	Ryan Lochte; United States	1:48.20	Mitch Larkin; Australia	1:48.35
Breaststroke
50 m breaststroke	Felipe França Silva; Brazil	25.63 CR, AM	Adam Peaty (United Kingdom) Great Britain and Cameron van der Burgh; South Africa	25.87	not awarded	
100 m breaststroke	Felipe França Silva; Brazil	56.29 CR	Adam Peaty (United Kingdom) Great Britain	56.35	Giacomo Perez-Dortona; France	56.78
200 m breaststroke	Dániel Gyurta; Hungary	2:01.49	Marco Koch; Germany	2:01.91	Kirill Prigoda; Russia	2:02.38
Butterfly
50 m butterfly	Chad le Clos; South Africa	21.95 CR	Nicholas Santos; Brazil	22.08 AM	Andriy Hovorov; Ukraine	22.49
100 butterfly	Chad le Clos; South Africa	48.44 WR	Tom Shields; United States	48.99	Tommaso D'Orsogna; Australia	49.60
200 m butterfly	Chad le Clos; South Africa	1:48.61 CR	Daiya Seto; Japan	1:48.92 AS	Paweł Korzeniowski; Poland	1:50.21
Individual medley
100 m individual medley	Markus Deibler; Germany	50.66 WR	Vladimir Morozov; Russia	50.81	Ryan Lochte; United States	51.24
200 m individual medley	Kosuke Hagino; Japan	1:50.47 AS	Ryan Lochte; United States	1:51.31	Daiya Seto; Japan	1:51.79
400 m individual medley	Daiya Seto; Japan	3:56.33 AS	Kosuke Hagino; Japan	4:01.17	Dávid Verrasztó; Hungary	4:01.82
Relays
4 × 50 m freestyle relay	(Russia) Russia; Vladimir Morozov (21.01); Evgeny Sedov (20.37); Oleg Tikhobaev (20.59); Sergey Fesikov (20.63); Nikita Konovalov^{[a]} Yevgeny Korotyshkin^{[a]} Aleksandr Popkov^{[a]}	1:22.60 WR	(United States) United States; Josh Schneider (21.05); Tom Shields (20.99); Jimmy Feigen (20.79); Ryan Lochte (20.64); Matt Grevers^{[a]} Darian Townsend^{[a]}	1:23.47	(Italy) Italy; Luca Dotto (21.45); Marco Orsi (20.43); Filippo Magnini (21.35); Marco Belotti (21.33); Nicolangelo Di Fabio^{[a]}	1:24.56
4 × 100 m freestyle relay	(France) France; Clément Mignon (47.05); Fabien Gilot (46.13); Florent Manaudou (44.80); Mehdy Metella (45.80)	3:03.78 CR, ER	(Russia) Russia; Vladimir Morozov (45.51 CR); Sergey Fesikov (46.01); Danila Izotov (45.79); Mikhail Polischuk (46.87); Oleg Tikhobaev^{[a]} Nikita Konovalov^{[a]}	3:04.18	(United States) United States; Jimmy Feigen (47.41); Matt Grevers (46.13); Ryan Lochte (46.02); Tom Shields (46.02); Darian Townsend^{[a]}	3:05.58
4 × 200 m freestyle relay	(United States) United States; Conor Dwyer (1:43.20); Ryan Lochte (1:42.42); Matt McLean (1:43.20); Tyler Clary (1:42.86); Michael Klueh^{[a]} Michael Weiss^{[a]} Darian Townsend^{[a]}	6:51.68	(Italy) Italy; Andrea Mitchell D'Arrigo (1:42.77); Marco Belotti (1:43.98); Nicolangelo Di Fabio (1:42.98); Filippo Magnini (1:42.07)	6:51.80	(South Africa) South Africa; Myles Brown (1:43.25); Sebastien Rousseau (1:43.96); Chad le Clos (1:40.61); Leith Shankland (1:44.31); Calvyn Justus^{[a]}	6:51.96
4 × 50 m medley relay	(Brazil) Brazil; Guilherme Guido (23.42); Felipe França Silva (25.33); Nicholas Santos (21.68); César Cielo (20.08); Henrique Martins^{[a]} ~~João Luiz Gomes Júnior~~^{[a]}^{[b]} João de Lucca^{[a]}	1:30.51 WR	(France) France; Benjamin Stasiulis (23.41); Giacomo Perez-Dortona (25.74); Mehdy Metella (22.06); Florent Manaudou (20.04); Clément Mignon^{[a]}	1:31.25 ER	(United States) United States; Eugene Godsoe (23.11); Cody Miller (26.04); Tom Shields (21.99); Josh Schneider (20.69); Matt Grevers^{[a]} Brad Craig^{[a]}	1:31.83
4 × 100 m medley relay	(Brazil) Brazil; Guilherme Guido (50.11); Felipe França Silva (56.73); Marcos Macedo (49.63); César Cielo (44.67); ~~João Luiz Gomes Júnior~~^{[a]}^{[b]} Henrique Martins^{[a]}	3:21.14 SA	(United States) United States; Matt Grevers (49.79); Cody Miller (57.03); Tom Shields (48.80); Ryan Lochte (45.87); Eugene Godsoe^{[a]} Brad Craig^{[a]} Darian Townsend^{[a]} Jimmy Feigen^{[a]}	3:21.49	(France) France; Florent Manaudou (50.35); Giacomo Perez-Dortona (57.00); Mehdy Metella (49.07); Clément Mignon (45.84); Benjamin Stasiulis^{[a]}	3:22.26

^{a} Swimmers who participated in the heats only and received medals.
^{b} On December 4, 2014, João Luiz Gomes Júnior was tested positive to the substance Hydrochlorothiazide. All his results achieved on or after December 4, 2014 shall be annulled. The results of the Brazilian relays obtained were not cancelled.

=== Women's events ===
Event	Gold		Silver		Bronze	
Freestyle
50 m freestyle	Ranomi Kromowidjojo; Netherlands	23.32	Bronte Campbell; Australia	23.62	Dorothea Brandt; Germany	23.77
100 m freestyle	Femke Heemskerk; Netherlands	51.37 CR	Sarah Sjöström; Sweden	51.39	Ranomi Kromowidjojo; Netherlands	51.47
200 m freestyle	Sarah Sjöström; Sweden	1:50.78 WR	Katinka Hosszú; Hungary	1:51.18	Femke Heemskerk; Netherlands	1:51.69
400 m freestyle	Mireia Belmonte; Spain	3:55.76 CR	Sharon van Rouwendaal; Netherlands	3:57.76	Zhang Yufei; China	3:59.51 AS
800 m freestyle	Mireia Belmonte; Spain	8:03.41 CR	Jazz Carlin (United Kingdom) Great Britain	8:08.16	Sharon van Rouwendaal; Netherlands	8:08.17
Backstroke
50 m backstroke	Etiene Medeiros; Brazil	25.67 WR	Emily Seebohm; Australia	25.83 OC	Katinka Hosszú; Hungary	25.96
100 m backstroke	Katinka Hosszú; Hungary	55.03 WR	Emily Seebohm; Australia	55.31 OC	Daryna Zevina; Ukraine	55.54
200 m backstroke	Katinka Hosszú; Hungary	1:59.23 WR	Emily Seebohm; Australia	2:00.13 OC	Sayaka Akase; Japan	2:02.30
Breaststroke
50 m breaststroke	Rūta Meilutytė; Lithuania	28.84	Alia Atkinson; Jamaica	28.91	Moniek Nijhuis; Netherlands	29.64
100 m breaststroke	Alia Atkinson; Jamaica	1:02.36 WR	Rūta Meilutytė; Lithuania	1:02.46	Moniek Nijhuis; Netherlands	1:04.03
200 m breaststroke	Kanako Watanabe; Japan	2:16.92	Rie Kaneto; Japan	2:17.43	Rikke Møller Pedersen; Denmark	2:17.83
Butterfly
50 m butterfly	Sarah Sjöström; Sweden	24.58 CR	Jeanette Ottesen; Denmark	24.71	Inge Dekker; Netherlands	24.73
100 m butterfly	Sarah Sjöström; Sweden	54.61 WR	Lu Ying; China	55.25 AS	Jeanette Ottesen; Denmark	55.32
200 m butterfly	Mireia Belmonte; Spain	1:59.61 WR	Katinka Hosszú; Hungary	2:01.12	Franziska Hentke; Germany	2:03.89
Individual medley
100 m individual medley	Katinka Hosszú; Hungary	56.70 WR	Siobhan-Marie O'Connor (United Kingdom) Great Britain	57.83	Emily Seebohm; Australia	58.19
200 m individual medley	Katinka Hosszú; Hungary	2:01.86 WR	Siobhan-Marie O'Connor (United Kingdom) Great Britain	2:05.87	Melanie Margalis; United States	2:06.68
400 m individual medley	Mireia Belmonte; Spain	4:19.86 WR	Katinka Hosszú; Hungary	4:22.94	Hannah Miley (United Kingdom) Great Britain	4:24.74
Relays
4 × 50 m freestyle relay	(Netherlands) Netherlands; Inge Dekker (24.09); Femke Heemskerk (23.24); Maud van der Meer (24.03); Ranomi Kromowidjojo (22.88); Esmee Vermeulen^{[a]}	1:34.24 WR	(United States) United States; Madison Kennedy (24.06); Abbey Weitzeil (23.40); Natalie Coughlin (23.39); Amy Bilquist (23.76); Kathleen Baker^{[a]} Amanda Weir^{[a]}	1:34.61	(Denmark) Denmark; Jeanette Ottesen (23.73); Julie Levisen (24.30); Mie Nielsen (23.49); Pernille Blume (23.96); Sarah Bro^{[a]}	1:35.48
4 × 100 m freestyle relay	(Netherlands) Netherlands; Inge Dekker (52.39); Femke Heemskerk (50.58); Maud van der Meer (52.55); Ranomi Kromowidjojo (51.01); Esmee Vermeulen^{[a]} Rieneke Terink^{[a]}	3:26.53 WR	(United States) United States; Natalie Coughlin (52.25); Abbey Weitzeil (51.57); Madison Kennedy (51.82); Shannon Vreeland (52.06); Amy Bilquist^{[a]} Amanda Weir^{[a]}	3:27.70	(Italy) Italy; Erika Ferraioli (52.70); Silvia Di Pietro (52.30); Aglaia Pezzato (52.72); Federica Pellegrini (51.76); Alice Mizzau^{[a]}	3:29.48
4 × 200 m freestyle relay	(Netherlands) Netherlands; Inge Dekker (1:54.73); Femke Heemskerk (1:51.22); Ranomi Kromowidjojo (1:54.17); Sharon van Rouwendaal (1:52.73); Esmee Vermeulen^{[a]}	7:32.85 WR	(China) China; Qiu Yuhan (1:53.26); Cao Yue (1:54.48); Guo Junjun (1:55.14); Shen Duo (1:54.14)	7:37.02	(Australia) Australia; Leah Neale (1:54.15); Madison Wilson (1:54.37); Brianna Throssell (1:56.80); Kylie Palmer (1:53.27); Katie Goldman^{[a]}	7:38.59
4 × 50 m medley relay	(Denmark) Denmark; Mie Nielsen (26.39); Rikke Pedersen (29.56); Jeanette Ottesen (24.09); Pernille Blume (24.00)	1:44.04 WR	(United States) United States; Felicia Lee (26.37); Emma Reaney (29.42); Claire Donahue (25.33); Natalie Coughlin (23.80); Amanda Weir^{[a]}	1:44.92	(France) France; Mathilde Cini (26.61); Charlotte Bonnet (30.29); Mélanie Henique (25.20); Anna Santamans (23.79)	1:45.89
4 × 100 m medley relay	(Denmark) Denmark; Mie Nielsen (56.86); Rikke Pedersen (1:04.62); Jeanette Ottesen (54.99); Pernille Blume (52.39)	3:48.86 ER	(Australia) Australia; Madison Wilson (57.31); Sally Hunter (1:04.34); Emily Seebohm (57.26); Bronte Campbell (51.40); Katie Goldman^{[a]}	3:50.31	(Japan) Japan; Sayaka Akase (57.11); Kanako Watanabe (1:05.32); Rino Hosoda (56.89); Miki Uchida (51.18)	3:50.50

^{a} Swimmers who participated in the heats only and received medals.

=== Mixed events ===
Event	Gold		Silver		Bronze	
4 × 50 m freestyle relay	(United States) United States; Josh Schneider (20.94); Matt Grevers (20.75); Madison Kennedy (23.63); Abbey Weitzeil (23.25); Darian Townsend^{[a]} Amy Bilquist^{[a]} Natalie Coughlin^{[a]}	1:28.57 WR	(Russia) Russia; Evgeny Sedov (20.59); Vladimir Morozov (20.65); Veronika Popova (23.93); Rozaliya Nasretdinova (23.96); Oleg Tikhobaev^{[a]} Nikita Konovalov^{[a]} Margarita Nesterova^{[a]}	1:29.13 ER	(Brazil) Brazil; César Cielo (20.65); João de Lucca (21.03); Etiene Medeiros (23.58); Larissa Oliveira (23.91); Alan Vitória^{[a]} Henrique Martins^{[a]} Daiane Oliveira^{[a]} Alessandra Marchioro^{[a]}	1:29.17 SA
4 × 50 m medley relay	(Brazil) Brazil; Etiene Medeiros (25.83 AM); Felipe França Silva (25.45); Nicholas Santos (21.81); Larissa Oliveira (24.17); ~~João Luiz Gomes Júnior~~^{[a]}^{[b]} Henrique Martins^{[a]} Daiane Oliveira^{[a]}	1:37.26 SA	(United Kingdom) Great Britain; Chris Walker-Hebborn (23.42); Adam Peaty (25.89); Siobhan-Marie O'Connor (25.10); Fran Halsall (23.05)	1:37.46 ER	(Italy) Italy; Niccolo Bonacchi (23.58); Fabio Scozzoli (25.55); Silvia Di Pietro (25.22); Erika Ferraioli (23.55); Simone Sabbioni^{[a]}	1:37.90

^{a} Swimmers who participated in the heats only and received medals.
^{b} On December 4, 2014, João Luiz Gomes Júnior was tested positive to the substance Hydrochlorothiazide. All his results achieved on or after December 4, 2014 shall be annulled. The results of the Brazilian relays obtained were not cancelled.
