= Cate Campbell =

Australian competitive swimmer (born 1992)

Cate Campbell OAM
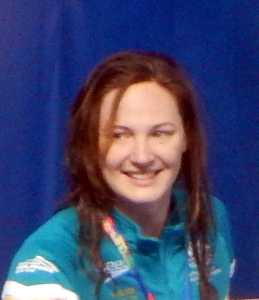
- Campbell at the 2015 World Aquatics Championships

Personal information
- Full name: Cate Natalie Campbell
- Born: 20 May 1992 (age 34) Blantyre, Malawi
- Height: 186 cm (6 ft 1 in)
- Weight: 74 kg (163 lb)

Sport
- Sport: Swimming
- Strokes: Freestyle
- Club: Commercial
- Coach: Simon Cusack
Medal record
Event	1st	2nd	3rd
Olympic Games	4	1	3
World Championships (LC)	4	5	3
Pan Pacific Championships	9	0	0
Commonwealth Games	6	2	0
Universiade	1	0	1
Total	24	8	7
Women's swimming
Representing Australia
Olympic Games
Gold medal – first place	2012 London	4×100 m freestyle
Gold medal – first place	2016 Rio de Janeiro	4×100 m freestyle
Gold medal – first place	2020 Tokyo	4×100 m freestyle
Gold medal – first place	2020 Tokyo	4×100 m medley
Silver medal – second place	2016 Rio de Janeiro	4×100 m medley
Bronze medal – third place	2008 Beijing	50 m freestyle
Bronze medal – third place	2008 Beijing	4×100 m freestyle
Bronze medal – third place	2020 Tokyo	100 m freestyle
World Championships (LC)
Gold medal – first place	2013 Barcelona	100 m freestyle
Gold medal – first place	2015 Kazan	4×100 m freestyle
Gold medal – first place	2019 Gwangju	4×100 m freestyle
Gold medal – first place	2019 Gwangju	4×100 m mixed medley
Silver medal – second place	2013 Barcelona	50 m freestyle
Silver medal – second place	2013 Barcelona	4×100 m freestyle
Silver medal – second place	2013 Barcelona	4×100 m medley
Silver medal – second place	2019 Gwangju	100 m freestyle
Silver medal – second place	2019 Gwangju	4×100 m medley
Bronze medal – third place	2009 Rome	50 m freestyle
Bronze medal – third place	2015 Kazan	100 m freestyle
Bronze medal – third place	2019 Gwangju	50 m freestyle
Pan Pacific Championships
Gold medal – first place	2014 Gold Coast	50 m freestyle
Gold medal – first place	2014 Gold Coast	100 m freestyle
Gold medal – first place	2014 Gold Coast	4×100 m freestyle
Gold medal – first place	2014 Gold Coast	4×100 m medley
Gold medal – first place	2018 Tokyo	50 m freestyle
Gold medal – first place	2018 Tokyo	100 m freestyle
Gold medal – first place	2018 Tokyo	4×100 m freestyle
Gold medal – first place	2018 Tokyo	4×100 m medley
Gold medal – first place	2018 Tokyo	4×100 m mixed medley
Commonwealth Games
Gold medal – first place	2014 Glasgow	100 m freestyle
Gold medal – first place	2014 Glasgow	4×100 m freestyle
Gold medal – first place	2014 Glasgow	4×100 m medley
Gold medal – first place	2018 Gold Coast	50 m freestyle
Gold medal – first place	2018 Gold Coast	50 m butterfly
Gold medal – first place	2018 Gold Coast	4×100 m freestyle
Silver medal – second place	2014 Glasgow	50 m freestyle
Silver medal – second place	2018 Gold Coast	100 m freestyle
Universiade
Gold medal – first place	2011 Shenzhen	4×100 m freestyle
Bronze medal – third place	2011 Shenzhen	50 m freestyle

Cate Natalie Campbell, OAM (born 20 May 1992) is an Australian former competitive swimmer. She is the current world record holder in the short course 100 m freestyle. She is also a former world record holder in the long course 100 m freestyle, breaking Britta Steffen's supersuit WR by 0.01.

Campbell has eight Olympic medals, four of which are gold, across four Olympics. Campbell was Australia's joint flagbearer at the Tokyo 2020 Olympics.

She was coached by Simon Cusack at the Commercial Swimming Club for over two decades, before moving to train with Damien Jones at the Rackley Swimming Club, then Vince Raleigh at Chandler in her fifth and final Olympic campaign bid.

Campbell is regarded as one of the greatest Australian swimmers and one of the best relay swimmers of all time, holding four of the fastest 100 m freestyle splits in history at the time of her retirement. In particular, she has been credited as the doyen of the Australian women's sprinting dynasty alongside her sister Bronte.

== Early life ==
Cate is the first of five children born to South African parents, Eric, an accountant, and Jenny, a nurse. She was born in Malawi. She has four younger siblings (three sisters and one brother): Bronte, Jessica, Hamish, and Abigail. Her brother Hamish has severe cerebral palsy and requires around-the-clock care.

Jenny used to be a swimmer and taught her three daughters to swim, in the pool at the family's home. Cate also recalls swimming near Hippopotami in Lake Malawi as a small child. Lake Malawi is the second deepest lake in Africa. It was in this lake that her father, Eric, would go sailing on weekends. Campbell and her siblings were homeschooled as children. Her mother also frequently read the Bible to her, while she was growing up. The Campbells lived in a big house, with no TV. They had many pets, including turkeys, guinea pigs, dogs, cats, and chickens. Campbell describes every morning like "an Easter egg hunt; the chickens would lay eggs all around the house."

During her schooling, Campbell states she could not sing or dance, but swimming was something she excelled at. She also stated she received top marks for public speaking at school. Aside from those, she claims she was an "average student".

The Campbells moved from Malawi to Australia in 2001 and Campbell took up competitive swimming soon after. She completed her secondary school studies at Kenmore State High School in Brisbane, Queensland. Her sister Bronte is also an Olympic swimmer and the pair competed in the same event at the 2012 Summer Olympics, and won the gold medal together at the 2016 Summer Olympics as members of the Australian women's 4 × 100 m freestyle team.

== Career ==
=== 2008 Olympics ===
Cate was the fastest qualifier into the 50 metre freestyle semi-finals, after recording a time of 24.20 seconds. This placed her in Lane 4 in the semi-finals against the world record holder Libby Trickett. In the second semi-final Cate placed second in a time of 24.42 seconds, placing her in Lane 5 for the final. In the final, she placed third in a time of 24.17. She also won bronze as part of Australia's women's 4 x 100 metre freestyle relay team.

=== 2009 World Championship ===
Despite doing a time trial of 53.40 seconds, with her 100-metre performance of 56.39 from 5 months earlier in March and having hip problems, she was scratched from the women's 4 × 100 metre freestyle. However, she still earned the right to swim the 50 metre freestyle from her runner-up swim at the world championships trials. In Rome she finished with a bronze, beating compatriot Libby Trickett and ending 0.02 of a second off the Commonwealth Record.

=== 2012 Olympics ===
In 2010, Cate and her sister Bronte caught glandular fever; they worked against post-viral fatigue as they trained to qualify for the 2012 Summer Olympics in London. Cate Campbell was a member of the Australian team that won the gold medal in the 4 × 100 metre freestyle relay at the Games. Before the individual 50 metre event, she contracted acute pancreatitis. In the women's 50 metre freestyle she and Bronte swam in the same heat, finishing third and second respectively, and qualifying for the semi-final in tenth and ninth place respectively.

=== 2013 ===
At the 2013 Australian Swimming Championships she won gold in both the 50 and 100 metre freestyle events, qualifying for the 2013 World Aquatics Championships. At the World Championships, she teamed up with her sister Bronte, Emma McKeon and Alicia Coutts in the 4 × 100 metre freestyle relay where they won the silver medal, finishing 0.12 of a second behind the American team. On the sixth day of competition, Campbell won the 100 metre freestyle world title with a time of 52.34 seconds. Campbell finished ahead of Sarah Sjöström of Sweden and defending Olympic champion, Ranomi Kromowidjojo.

=== 2015 ===
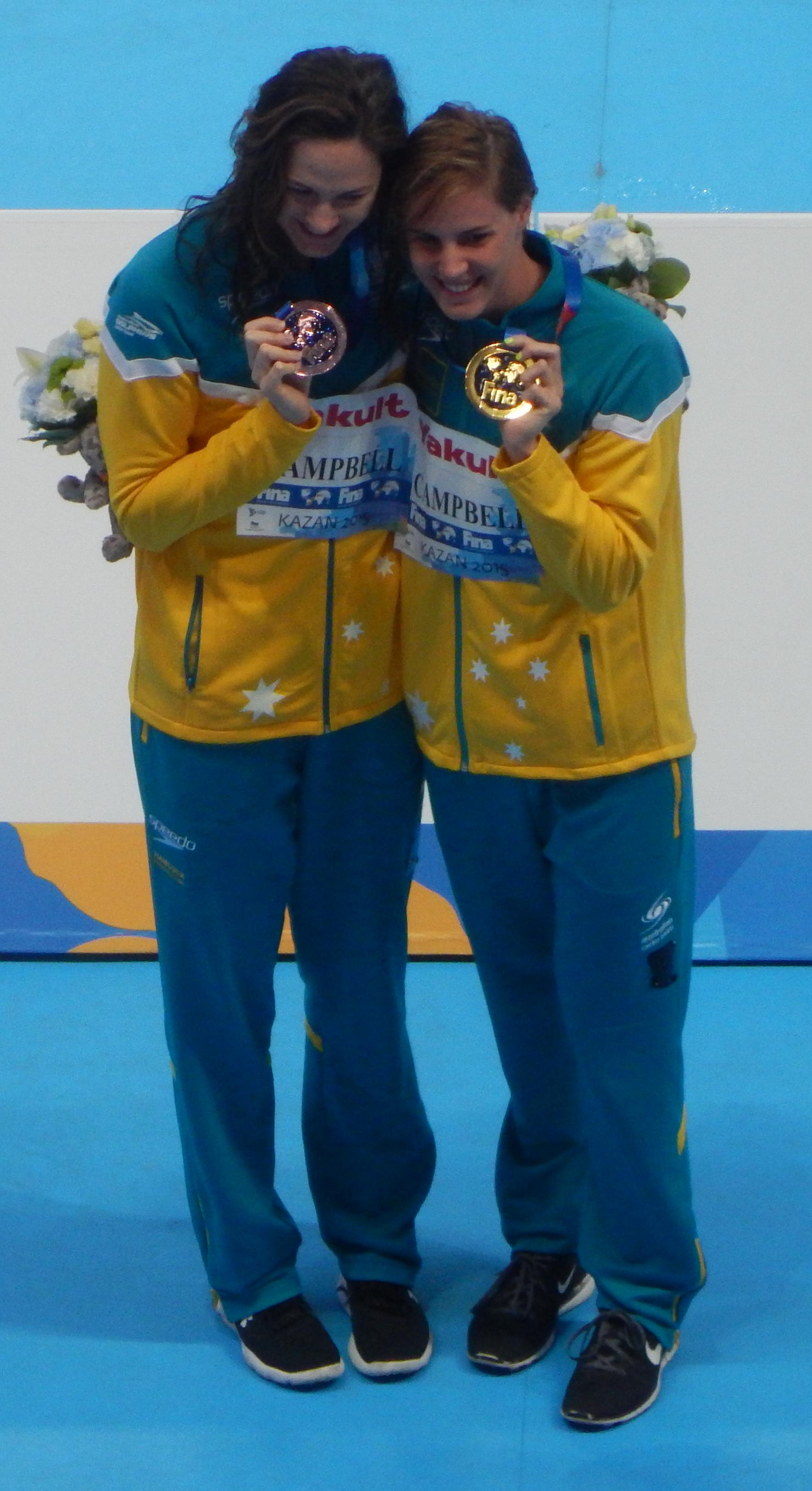
Cate Campbell (left) and her sister Bronte at the 2015 World Aquatics Championships

At the 2015 World Championships in Kazan, she won gold in the 4 × 100 metre freestyle relay, beating the Dutch and US teams by a comfortable lead. On the 100 metre freestyle event she finished third, behind Bronte Campbell and Sarah Sjöström. At the 2015 Australian Short Course Swimming Championships in Sydney, she broke the short course 100 metre freestyle world record in a time of 50.91, becoming the first woman to go under 51 seconds.

=== 2016 ===
At the 2016 Australian Swimming Championships she won the 100-metre freestyle to qualify for the 2016 Summer Olympics. She broke the Australian record in the 50 metre freestyle in the semifinals with a time of 23.93, which was the fastest time ever in a textile swimsuit. She went on to win the final and qualify for the Olympics in the 50 metre freestyle, improving her time to 23.84. In addition, Campbell also qualified for the Olympic team in both the 4 × 100 m freestyle (winning gold in a new world-record time) & 4 × 100 m medley relays. At the 2016 Australian Grand Prix meet, she broke the long course 100 metre freestyle world record in a time of 52.06. This was 0.01 seconds faster than the previous world record set by Britta Steffen during the super suit era.

==== 2016 Summer Olympics ====
At the 2016 Summer Olympics Campbell won a gold medal as a member of the Australian women's 4 × 100 m freestyle team. The team, which included Campbell's sister Bronte, set a world record time of 3:30.65. This was followed by a silver medal as a member of the women's 4 × 100 m medley team. In the Olympic final of the 100 m freestyle, Campbell was the favourite, however after leading at the first turn, she faded and finished 6th in 53.24, despite breaking the Olympic record in the heats and semifinals with times of 52.78 and 52.71, respectively. She narrowly missed a medal in the 50 m freestyle final, finishing 5th.

=== 2017 ===
After the Rio Olympics, Campbell took 2017 off from swimming competitively in order to recover from disappointment. She used most of the year to do "normal things" other people her age might do, taking her first real break from training since the age of 9. At the 2017 Australian Short Course Swimming Championships she broke the 100 metre freestyle world record in a time of 50.25, improving the previous mark by 0.33 seconds.

=== 2018 ===
Campbell returned to competition for the Gold Coast Commonwealth Games, winning gold and breaking the world record in the women's 4 × 100m freestyle relay, alongside sister Bronte, Emma McKeon and Shayna Jack. She then won gold for the women's 50m freestyle, with a time of 23.78, breaking a Commonwealth record. She also won gold for the women's 50m butterfly, despite having no prior experience in the stroke. She stated she opted for the event to "shake things up" and "to try something new and different". Campbell claimed the silver medal for the 100m freestyle with a time of 52.69, touching behind her sister Bronte, who had a time of 52.27.

=== 2021 ===
Campbell qualified for her 4th Olympics, Tokyo 2020, becoming the third Australian swimmer to do so, after Leisel Jones and Emily Seebohm. On 7 July 2021, she was announced as one of Australia's flagbearers for the Opening Ceremony, alongside basketball player, Patty Mills, and becoming the first Australian female swimmer to do so. Alongside Emma McKeon, Meg Harris, and sister Bronte, Campbell won gold in the women's 4 × 100 m freestyle relay, again breaking Australia's previous record. This also marked the 3rd time Campbell has won gold in the same event. She then went on to win the bronze medal in the 100m freestyle, behind Emma McKeon (gold) and Hong Kong's Siobhan Haughey (silver).

On day 9 of the Olympics, Campbell finished 7th in the 50m freestyle final. Half an hour later, she and the Australian team won gold in the women's medley relay, alongside Kaylee McKeown, Chelsea Hodges and Emma McKeon.

=== 2024 ===
Campbell took an 18 month break following the Tokyo Olympics in 2021 before announcing her tilt at a fifth and final Olympics, hoping to become the first Australian swimmer to do so. At the 2024 Australian Swimming Trials, Campbell placed 9th in the 100m freestyle heats, failing to progress to the final by 0.01. With her hopes to make a fifth Olympic team hinging on a top two finish in the 50 freestyle, Campbell placed seventh. After the race, Campbell was embraced by her sister Bronte and the other finalists. After receiving a standing ovation, she confirmed her retirement in a special post-race interview and bid an emotional farewell to the Chandler crowd - the same pool where Campbell begun her competitive career. Campbell's competitors paid homage to her for setting the standards in sprint freestyle nationally and internationally, as well as for being an inspiration in and out of the pool.

== Personal life ==
In 2015, Campbell opened up about her struggles with body image. She confessed that pressure from TV and magazine models made her want to be skinny, however it reached the point where she was getting sick. She read a chapter in Michael Phelps' book Beneath the Surface, where the line "skinny swimmers aren't good swimmers" stuck out in her head. Her mother encouraged her to see a dietitian, and now believes "the sum of your worth is so much more than what you look like".

On Campbell's Twitter profile, she identifies as an atheist, but she previously identified as Christian in 2010 and 2011, stating that she needed to rely on God for her "strength and love". At the time her family was attending a local Baptist church in Brisbane.

Since 2011, Campbell has been studying a degree in Mass Communication at Queensland University of Technology. She has stated that she wants to pursue a career that combines her interest in the media industry with her love of sport, when she retires. She is a member of the QUT Elite Athlete program.

Until December 2016, Campbell lived with her sister Bronte. As of 2017, they are no longer housemates. She subsequently bought a house in Morningside, Queensland.

Campbell enjoys hiking, listening to music, newspaper crosswords, and brewing Kombucha. She also owns a kayak.

She is a supporter of Nexus Care, a not-for-profit organisation, that aims to improve the lives of those living in poverty in the northern suburbs of Brisbane.

In November 2018, Campbell revealed she had been diagnosed with a stage one melanoma that developed in a mole she had had her whole life and had to get it removed. She urged her fans to get regular skin checks, stating "an hour out of your day once or twice a year is all it takes". She has since been praised for raising awareness of skin cancer.

== Results in major championships ==
Meet	50 free	100 free	50 fly	4×100 free	4×200 free	4×100 medley	4×100 Mixed free	4×100 Mixed medley
OG 2008	3rd place, bronze medalist(s)	10th		3rd place, bronze medalist(s)				
WC 2009	3rd place, bronze medalist(s)							
OG 2012	13th	DNS		1st place, gold medalist(s)				
WC 2013	2nd place, silver medalist(s)	1st place, gold medalist(s)		2nd place, silver medalist(s)		2nd place, silver medalist(s)		
CG 2014	2nd place, silver medalist(s)	1st place, gold medalist(s)		1st place, gold medalist(s)		1st place, gold medalist(s)		
PP 2014	1st place, gold medalist(s)	1st place, gold medalist(s)		1st place, gold medalist(s)		1st place, gold medalist(s)		
WC 2015	4th	3rd place, bronze medalist(s)		1st place, gold medalist(s)				
OG 2016	5th	6th		1st place, gold medalist(s)		2nd place, silver medalist(s)		
CG 2018	1st place, gold medalist(s)	2nd place, silver medalist(s)	1st place, gold medalist(s)	1st place, gold medalist(s)				
PP 2018	1st place, gold medalist(s)	1st place, gold medalist(s)		1st place, gold medalist(s)		1st place, gold medalist(s)		1st place, gold medalist(s)
WC 2019	3rd place, bronze medalist(s)	2nd place, silver medalist(s)		1st place, gold medalist(s)		2nd place, silver medalist(s)		1st place, gold medalist(s)
OG 2021	7th	3rd place, bronze medalist(s)		1st place, gold medalist(s)		1st place, gold medalist(s)		

== Personal bests ==
Long course
Event	Time	Date	Location
50 m freestyle	23.78 CR	2018-04-07	Southport, Australia
100 m freestyle	52.03 CR	2018-08-10	Tokyo, Japan
50 m butterfly	25.47 OC	2018-03-01	Gold Coast, Australia

Short course
Event	Time	Date	Location
50 m freestyle	23.19 CR	2017-10-27	Adelaide, Australia
100 m freestyle	50.25 Former WR	2017-10-26	Adelaide, Australia

Notes: WR = world record, CR = Commonwealth record, OC = Oceanian record, NR = national record

== World records ==
=== Long course metres ===
No.	Event	Time	Meet	Location	Date	Status	Ref
1	4x100 m mixed freestyle relay^{[a]}	3:23.29	BHP Billiton Aquatic Super Series	Perth, Australia	1 February 2014	Former	
2	4x100 m freestyle relay^{[b]}	3:30.98	2014 Commonwealth Games	Glasgow, Scotland	24 July 2014	Former	
3	100 m freestyle	52.06	Australia Grand Prix	Brisbane, Australia	2 July 2016	Former	
4	4x100 m freestyle relay (2)^{[c]}	3:30.65	2016 Summer Olympics	Rio de Janeiro, Brazil	6 August 2016	Former	
5	4x100 m freestyle relay (3)^{[d]}	3:30.05	2018 Commonwealth Games	Gold Coast, Queensland	5 April 2018	Former	
6	4x100 m freestyle relay (4)^{[e]}	3:29.69	2020 Summer Olympics	Tokyo, Japan	25 July 2021	Former	

^{a} split 52.83 (2nd leg); with Tomaso D'Orsogna (1st leg), James Magnussen (3rd leg), Bronte Campbell (4th leg)
^{b} split 52.16 (4th leg); with Bronte Campbell (1st leg), Melanie Schlanger (2nd leg), Emma McKeon (3rd leg)
^{c} split 51.97 (4th leg); with Emma McKeon (1st leg), Brittany Elmslie (2nd leg), Bronte Campbell (3rd leg)
^{d} split 51.00 (4th leg); with Shayna Jack (1st leg), Bronte Campbell (2nd leg), Emma McKeon (3rd leg)
^{e} split 52.24 (4th leg); with Bronte Campbell (1st leg), Meg Harris (2nd leg), Emma McKeon (3rd leg)

=== Short course metres ===
No.	Event	Time		Meet	Location	Date	Status	Ref
1	4x50 m mixed medley relay^{[a]}	1:39.08	h	2013 FINA World Cup	Singapore	5 November 2013	Former	
2	4x50 m mixed medley relay (2)^{[b]}	1:38.02		2013 FINA World Cup	Singapore	5 November 2013	Former	
3	4x50 m mixed medley relay (3)^{[c]}	1:37.84		2013 FINA World Cup	Tokyo, Japan	9 November 2013	Former	
4	4x50 m mixed freestyle relay^{[d]}	1:31.13	h	2013 FINA World Cup	Tokyo, Japan	10 November 2013	Former	
5	4x50 m mixed freestyle relay (2)^{[e]}	1:29.61		2013 FINA World Cup	Tokyo, Japan	10 November 2013	Former	
6	100 m freestyle	50.91	†	Australian Short Course Championships	Sydney, Australia	28 November 2015	Former	
7	100 m freestyle (2)	50.25		Australian Short Course Championships	Adelaide, Australia	26 October 2017	Former	

Legend: OC – Oceanian record; NR – Australian record; e – equalled existing record;
Records not set in finals: h – heat; sf – semifinal; r – relay 1st leg; rh – relay heat 1st leg; b – B final; † – en route to final mark; so – swim-off; tt – time trial

^{a} split 23.63 (4th leg); with Robert Hurley (1st leg), Christian Sprenger (2nd leg), Alicia Coutts (3rd leg)
^{b} split 23.23 (4th leg); with Robert Hurley (1st leg), Christian Sprenger (2nd leg), Alicia Coutts (3rd leg)
^{c} split 23.28 (4th leg); with Robert Hurley (1st leg), Christian Sprenger (2nd leg), Alicia Coutts (3rd leg)
^{d} split 23.50 (4th leg); with Tomaso D'Orsogna (1st leg), Regan Leong (2nd leg), Bronte Campbell (3rd leg)
^{e} split 23.10 (3rd leg); with Tomaso D'Orsogna (1st leg), Travis Mahoney (2nd leg), Bronte Campbell (4th leg)

== Olympic records ==
=== Long course metres ===
No.	Event	Time		Meet	Location	Date	Status	Notes	Ref
1	4x100 m freestyle relay^{[a]}	3:33.15		2012 Summer Olympics	London, United Kingdom	28 July 2012	Former		
2	4x100 m freestyle relay^{[b]}	3:32.39	h	2016 Summer Olympics	Rio de Janeiro, Brazil	6 August 2016	Former		
3	4x100 m freestyle relay^{[c]}	3:30.65		2016 Summer Olympics	Rio de Janeiro, Brazil	6 August 2016	Former	Former WR, OC, NR	
4	100 m freestyle	52.78	h	2016 Summer Olympics	Rio de Janeiro, Brazil	10 August 2016	Former		
5	100 m freestyle	52.71	sf	2016 Summer Olympics	Rio de Janeiro, Brazil	10 August 2016	Former		
6	4x100 m freestyle relay^{[d]}	3:29.69		2020 Summer Olympics	Tokyo, Japan	25 July 2021	Former	Former WR, OC, NR	
7	4x100 m medley relay^{[e]}	3:51.60		2020 Summer Olympics	Tokyo, Japan	1 August 2021	Former	OC, NR	

Legend: WR – World record; OC – Oceanian record; NR – Australian record; e – equalled existing record;
Records not set in finals: h – heat; sf – semifinal; r – relay 1st leg; rh – relay heat 1st leg; b – B final; † – en route to final mark; so – swim-off; tt – time trial

^{a} split 53.19 (2nd leg); with Alicia Coutts (1st leg), Brittany Elmslie (3rd leg), Melanie Schlanger (4th leg)
^{b} split 51.80 (4th leg); with Madison Wilson (1st leg ), Brittany Elmslie (2nd leg), Bronte Campbell (3rd leg)
^{c} split 51.97 (4th leg); with Emma McKeon (1st leg), Brittany Elmslie (2nd leg), Bronte Campbell (3rd leg)
^{d} split 52.24 (4th leg); with Bronte Campbell (1st leg), Meg Harris (2nd leg), Emma McKeon (3rd leg)
^{e} split 52.11 (4th leg); with Kaylee McKeown (1st leg), Chelsea Hodges (2nd leg), Emma McKeon (3rd leg)

== See also ==
- List of Olympic medalists in swimming (women)
- List of World Aquatics Championships medalists in swimming (women)
- List of Commonwealth Games medallists in swimming (women)
- World record progression 100 metres freestyle
- World record progression 4 × 100 metres freestyle relay

Records
Preceded by Britta Steffen	Women's 100-metre freestyle world record-holder (long course); 2 July 2016 – 23 July 2017	Succeeded by Sarah Sjöström
Preceded by Libby Trickett; Sarah Sjöström	Women's 100-metre freestyle world record-holder (short course); 28 November 2015 – 3 August 2017; 26 October 2017 – 19 October 2025	Succeeded by Sarah Sjöström; Kate Douglass
Preceded by Florent Manaudou, Jérémy Stravius, Mélanie Henique, Anna Santamans	Mixed 4 × 50 metres freestyle relay world record-holder 10 November 2013 – 14 December 2013; With: Regan Leong (10 to 10 November), Tommaso D'Orsogna, Travis Mahoney, Bronte Campbell	Succeeded by Sergey Fesikov, Vladimir Morozov, Rozaliya Nasretdinova, Veronika Popova
Awards
Preceded by Ye Shiwen	Pacific Rim Swimmer of the Year; 2013, 2014	Succeeded by Emily Seebohm
Olympic Games
Preceded by Anna Meares	Flagbearer for Australia (with Patty Mills); Tokyo 2020	Succeeded by Eddie Ockenden (with Jessica Fox)
