= Felicia Lee =

American swimmer (born 1992)

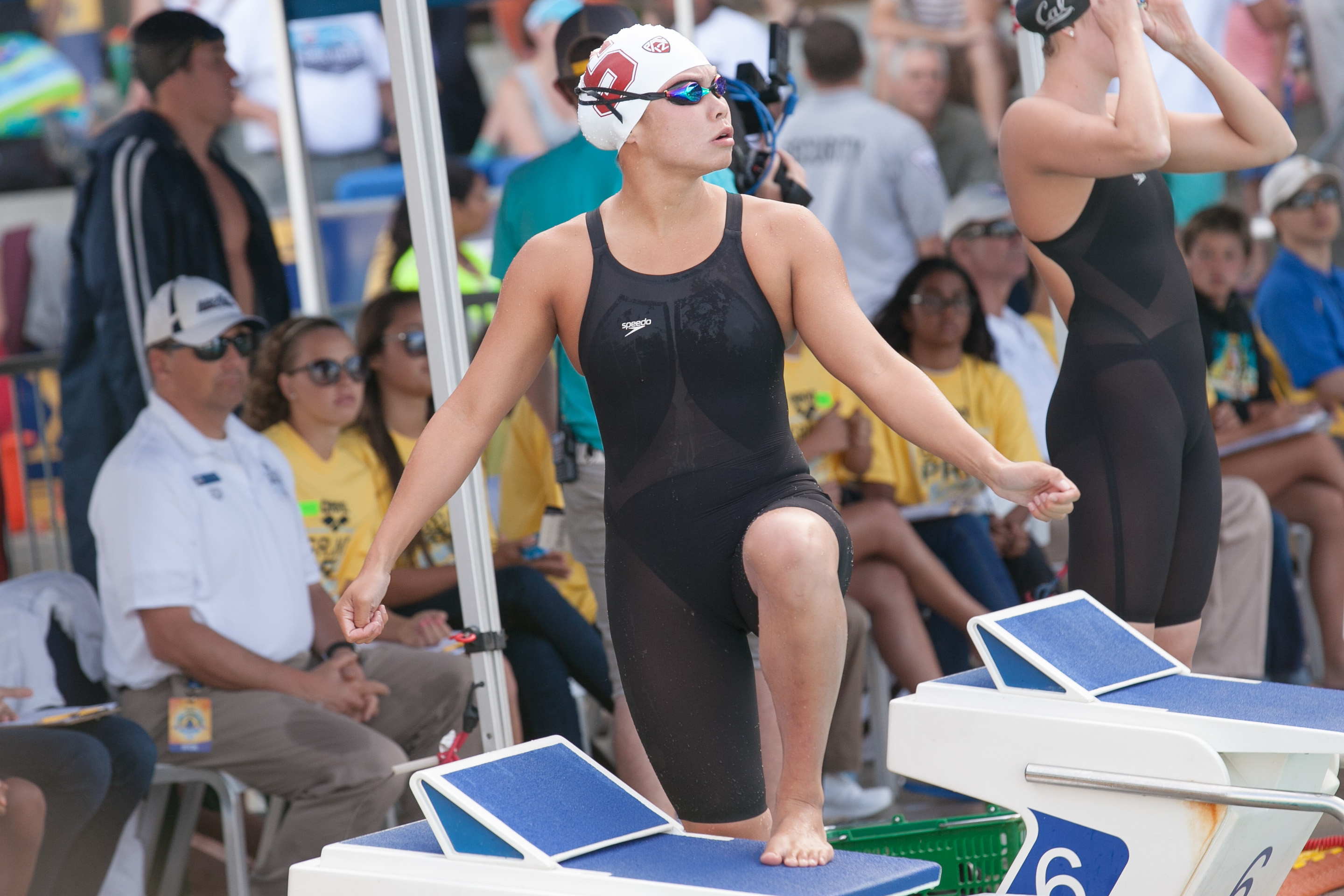
- Felicia Lee and Lia Neal at the Golden Goggles

Personal information
- Nicknames: "Flee", "The Hammer"
- National team: United States
- Born: May 19, 1992 (age 34) New York City, New York, U.S.
- Height: 5 ft 8 in (173 cm)
- Weight: 130 lb (59 kg)

Sport
- Sport: Swimming
- Strokes: Butterfly, freestyle
- Club: North Baltimore Aquatic Club
- College team: Stanford University
Medal record
Women's swimming
Representing the United States
World Championships (SC)
Silver medal – second place	2014 Doha	4×50 m medley
Universiade
Silver medal – second place	Shenzhen 2011	4×100 m medley
Silver medal – second place	Shenzhen 2011	4×100 m freestyle

Felicia Lee (born May 19, 1992) is an American competition swimmer. She is currently on the U.S. National Team, and was a member of the American silver medal team in the 4x50-meter medley relay at the 2014 FINA World Swimming Championships. She previously competed for Stanford University as a collegiate swimmer, and was recognized as the top college female swimmer in the United States in 2014.

== Early years ==
Lee was born in New York City, and grew up in Wayne, New Jersey. She is the daughter of Kin and Francesca Lee and has one older brother, Emmerson; who attended the University of Michigan, and one younger sister, Cassandra. Prior to starting the eighth grade, Lee moved to Towson, Maryland to train with the North Baltimore Aquatic Club with coach Paul Yetter. After Yetter's departure, Lee trained with Bob Bowman, who also coaches Michael Phelps and Allison Schmitt. Lee graduated from Towson High School.

Lee is currently the holder of 5 National Age-Group Records. They include: Age 13-14 100-yard butterfly, Age 13-14 4x100-yard medley relay, Age 13-14 4x200 freestyle relay, Age 13-14 4x100 freestyle relay, and Age 17-18 100-meter butterfly. Lee is also a two-time Spring National Champion in the 100-meter butterfly, winning in 2006 and 2007. Lee has been recognized by Sports Illustrated twice for her accomplishments in the pool. The first was June 2005, where Lee was featured in the "Faces in the Crowd" segment. The second feature was in the "Future Olympic Stars" segment on July 2, 2007.

At the 2009 USA Nationals and World Championship Trials, Lee placed sixth in the 100-meter butterfly and tenth in the 200-meter butterfly. The sixth-place finish earned Lee a spot on the U.S. National Team for the first time. At the 2010 USA Nationals and Pan Pacific Trials, Lee garnered a fifth-place showing, placing her on the 2011 World University Games team. Lee's performance in the 100-meter butterfly at the nationals was ranked 16th in the world in 2010.

== College career ==
Lee accepted an athletic scholarship to attend Stanford University in Palo Alto, California, where she swam for the Stanford Cardinal swimming and diving team in National Collegiate Athletic Association (NCAA) and Pac-12 Conference competition from 2011 to 2014. Following her senior season, she received the Honda Sports Award for Swimming and Diving, recognizing her as the outstanding college female swimmer of 2013–14.

She majored in human biology.

== International career ==
Lee was part of the 2006-2007 National Junior Team, 2007 Japan International Grand Prix, and competed at the 2009 FINA World Cup circuit. As part of the 2006-2007 National Junior Team, Lee competed at the Junior Pan Pacific Championships in Maui, Hawaii, where she won gold in the 100 m fly and silver as part of the 4 × 100 m medley relay. Lee was the youngest member of both the National Junior Team and the National Team competing at the Japan International Grand Prix.

In 2011, Lee competed at the World University Games in Shenzhen, China. She qualified to swim the 50 fly and 100 fly, and was a member on both the 4x100 free relay and the 4x100 medley relay. Lee advanced to the finals of both the 50 and 100 fly, but did not medal. Lee took silver as part of both second-place finishing relays at WUGs.

== See also ==
- List of Stanford University people
- List of United States records in swimming
