= Kyla Leibel =

Canadian swimmer (born 2001)

Personal information
- Full name: Kyla Anne Leibel
- Born: October 9, 2001 (age 25) Medicine Hat, Alberta, Canada
- Home town: Red Deer, Alberta, Canada
- Height: 180 cm (5 ft 11 in)

Sport
- Country: Canada
- Sport: Swimming
- Club: Red Deer Catalina Swim Club
- Coach: Lucien Zucchi
Medal record
Women's swimming
Representing Canada
Pan American Games
Silver medal – second place	2019 Lima	4x100 metre medley
Bronze medal – third place	2019 Lima	4x100 metre freestyle

Kyla Anne Leibel (born October 9, 2001) is a Canadian butterfly and freestyle swimmer.

Leibel competed at the 2018 Youth Olympics and at the 2018 Pan Pacific Swimming Championships which was the first competition where she represented Canada at a senior level. She also competed at the 2019 Pan American Games where she won a silver medal in the mixed 4x100 metre medley event and a bronze medal in the women's 4x100 metre freestyle event.
