= 2010 Pan Pacific Swimming Championships – Women's 50 metre freestyle =

Women's 50 metre freestyle at the 2010 Pan Pacific Swimming Championships
- Venue: William Woollett Jr. Aquatics Center
- Dates: August 21, 2010 (heats & finals)
- Competitors: 31 from 7 nations
- Winning time: 24.63

Medalists
| gold medal | Jessica Hardy | United States |
| silver medal | Amanda Weir | United States |
| bronze medal | Victoria Poon | Canada |

The women's 50 metre freestyle competition at the 2010 Pan Pacific Swimming Championships took place on August 21 at the William Woollett Jr. Aquatics Center. The last champion was Kara Lynn Joyce of US.

This race consisted of one length of the pool in freestyle.

== Records ==
Prior to this competition, the existing world and Pan Pacific records were as follows:

| World record | Britta Steffen (GER) | 23.73 | Rome, Italy | August 2, 2009 |
| Pan Pacific Championships record | Amy Van Dyken (USA) | 25.03 | Atlanta, United States | August 10, 1995 |

== Results ==
All times are in minutes and seconds.

| KEY: | q | Fastest non-qualifiers | Q | Qualified | CR | Championships record | NR | National record | PB | Personal best | SB | Seasonal best |

=== Heats ===
The first round was held on August 21, at 10:30.

| Rank | Heat | Lane | Name | Nationality | Time | Notes |
|---|---|---|---|---|---|---|
| 1 | 4 | 5 | Jessica Hardy | United States | 24.75 | QA, CR |
| 2 | 4 | 3 | Amanda Weir | United States | 24.97 | QA |
| 3 | 5 | 4 | Kara Lynn Joyce | United States | 25.00 | QA |
| 4 | 5 | 3 | Madison Kennedy | United States | 25.07 | QA |
| 5 | 5 | 6 | Victoria Poon | Canada | 25.06 | QA |
| 6 | 5 | 5 | Yolane Kukla | Australia | 25.18 | QA |
| 7 | 3 | 6 | Dana Vollmer | United States | 25.20 | QA |
| 8 | 4 | 4 | Marieke Guehrer | Australia | 25.25 | QA |
| 9 | 3 | 5 | Alice Mills | Australia | 25.32 | QB |
| 10 | 5 | 2 | Hayley Palmer | New Zealand | 25.48 | QB |
| 11 | 3 | 4 | Flávia Delaroli | Brazil | 25.52 | QB |
| 12 | 5 | 7 | Sophie Edington | Australia | 25.57 | QB |
| 13 | 3 | 2 | Christine Magnuson | United States | 25.69 | QB |
| 14 | 3 | 1 | Tomoko Hagiwara | Japan | 25.74 | QB |
| 15 | 4 | 7 | Yayoi Matsumoto | Japan | 25.76 | QB |
| 16 | 3 | 7 | Hannah Wilson | Hong Kong | 25.82 | QB |
| 17 | 4 | 6 | Sally Foster | Australia | 25.85 | |
| 18 | 5 | 1 | Haruka Ueda | Japan | 25.90 | |
| 19 | 4 | 8 | Kelly Stubbins | Australia | 25.94 | |
| 20 | 4 | 2 | Julyana Kury | Brazil | 25.95 | |
| 21 | 5 | 8 | Hanae Ito | Japan | 25.96 | |
| 22 | 3 | 3 | Tatiana Lemos | Brazil | 26.14 | |
| 22 | 4 | 1 | Hannah Riordan | Canada | 26.14 | |
| 24 | 2 | 3 | Mary Mohler | United States | 26.21 | |
| 25 | 2 | 4 | Amaka Gessler | New Zealand | 26.39 | |
| 26 | 3 | 8 | Tash Hind | New Zealand | 26.46 | |
| 27 | 2 | 2 | Penny Marshall | New Zealand | 26.47 | |
| 28 | 2 | 7 | Alexandra Gabor | Canada | 26.50 | |
| 29 | 2 | 6 | Felicity Galvez | Australia | 26.59 | |
| 30 | 1 | 4 | Rachel Bootsma | United States | 26.64 | |
| 31 | 1 | 5 | Emily Thomas | New Zealand | 26.95 | |
| - | 1 | 3 | Stephanie Rice | Australia | DNS | |
| - | 2 | 5 | Meagen Nay | Australia | DNS | |

=== B Final ===
The B final was held on August 21, at 18:51.

| Rank | Lane | Name | Nationality | Time | Notes |
|---|---|---|---|---|---|
| 9 | 4 | Kara Lynn Joyce | United States | 25.26 | |
| 10 | 5 | Alice Mills | Australia | 25.33 | |
| 11 | 3 | Yayoi Matsumoto | Japan | 25.62 | |
| 12 | 1 | Hannah Riordan | Canada | 25.68 | |
| 13 | 6 | Hannah Wilson | Hong Kong | 25.79 | |
| 14 | 7 | Hanae Ito | Japan | 25.91 | |
| 15 | 2 | Julyana Kury | Brazil | 26.03 | |
| 16 | 8 | Tatiana Lemos | Brazil | 26.04 | |

=== A Final ===
The A final was held on August 21, at 18:51.

| Rank | Lane | Name | Nationality | Time | Notes |
|---|---|---|---|---|---|
| 1st place, gold medalist(s) | 4 | Jessica Hardy | United States | 24.63 | CR |
| 2nd place, silver medalist(s) | 5 | Amanda Weir | United States | 24.70 | |
| 3rd place, bronze medalist(s) | 3 | Victoria Poon | Canada | 24.76 | |
| 4 | 6 | Yolane Kukla | Australia | 24.95 | |
| 5 | 2 | Marieke Guehrer | Australia | 24.99 | |
| 6 | 7 | Hayley Palmer | New Zealand | 25.35 | |
| 7 | 1 | Flávia Delaroli | Brazil | 25.36 | |
| 8 | 8 | Tomoko Hagiwara | Japan | 25.49 | |
