= 2010 Pan Pacific Swimming Championships – Women's 4 × 100 metre medley relay =

Women's 4 × 100 metre medley relay at the 2010 Pan Pacific Swimming Championships
- Venue: William Woollett Jr. Aquatics Center
- Dates: August 21, 2010 (heats & finals)
- Winning time: 3:55.23

Medalists
gold medal	Natalie Coughlin, Rebecca Soni, Dana Vollmer and Jessica Hardy	United States
silver medal	Emily Seebohm, Leisel Jones, Alicia Coutts and Yolane Kukla	Australia
bronze medal	Aya Terakawa, Satomi Suzuki, Yuka Kato and Haruka Ueda	Japan

The women's 4 × 100 metre medley relay competition at the 2010 Pan Pacific Swimming Championships took place on August 21 at the William Woollett Jr. Aquatics Center. The last champion was the United States.

== Records ==
Prior to this competition, the existing world and Pan Pacific records were as follows:

World record	China (CHN); Zhao Jing (58.98); Chen Huijia (1:04.12); Jiao Liuyang (56.28); Li Zhesi (52.81)	3:52.19	Rome, Italy	August 1, 2009
Pan Pacific Championships record	United States (USA); Natalie Coughlin (1:00.12); Jessica Hardy (1:06.53); Rachel Komisarz (57.88); Amanda Weir (53.85)	3:58.38	Victoria, Canada	August 20, 2006

== Results ==
All times are in minutes and seconds.

KEY:	q	Fastest non-qualifiers	Q	Qualified	CR	Championships record	NR	National record	PB	Personal best	SB	Seasonal best

=== Heats ===
Heats weren't performed, as only four teams had entered.

=== Final ===
The final was held on August 21, at 20:15.

Rank	Lane	Name	Nationality	Time	Notes
1st place, gold medalist(s)	5	Natalie Coughlin (59.85); Rebecca Soni (1:05.35); Dana Vollmer (56.91); Jessica Hardy (53.12)	United States	3:55.23	CR
2nd place, silver medalist(s)	4	Emily Seebohm (59.34 CR); Leisel Jones (1:05.38); Alicia Coutts (57.86); Yolane Kukla (54.38)	Australia	3:56.96	
3rd place, bronze medalist(s)	3	Aya Terakawa (59.41); Satomi Suzuki (1:06.54); Yuka Kato (57.96); Haruka Ueda (53.84)	Japan	3:57.75	
4	2	Julia Wilkinson (1:00.60); Annamay Pierse (1:07.70); Katerine Savard (1:00.12); Victoria Poon (54.66)	Canada	4:03.08	
-	6	- - - -	Brazil	DNS	
