= 2010 Pan Pacific Swimming Championships – Women's 4 × 100 metre freestyle relay =

Women's 4 × 100 metre freestyle relay at the 2010 Pan Pacific Swimming Championships
- Venue: William Woollett Jr. Aquatics Center
- Dates: August 20, 2010 (heats & finals)
- Winning time: 3:35.11

Medalists
gold medal	Natalie Coughlin, Jessica Hardy, Amanda Weir and Dana Vollmer	United States
silver medal	Yolane Kukla, Emily Seebohm, Alicia Coutts and Felicity Galvez	Australia
bronze medal	Victoria Poon, Julia Wilkinson, Erica Morningstar and Genevieve Saumur	Canada

The women's 4 × 100 metre freestyle relay competition at the 2010 Pan Pacific Swimming Championships took place on August 20 at the William Woollett Jr. Aquatics Center. The last champion was the United States.

This race consisted of eight lengths of the pool. Each of the four swimmers completed two lengths of the pool. The first swimmer had to touch the wall before the second could leave the starting block.

== Records ==
Prior to this competition, the existing world and Pan Pacific records were as follows:

World record	Netherlands (NED); Inge Dekker (53.61); Ranomi Kromowidjojo (52.30); Femke Heemskerk (53.03); Marleen Veldhuis (52.78)	3:31.72	Rome, Italy	July 26, 2009
Pan Pacific Championships record	United States (USA); Amanda Weir (53.76); Natalie Coughlin (53.21); Kara Lynn Joyce (54.54); Lacey Nymeyer (54.29)	3:35.80	Victoria, Canada	August 19, 2006

== Results ==
All times are in minutes and seconds.

KEY:	q	Fastest non-qualifiers	Q	Qualified	CR	Championships record	NR	National record	PB	Personal best	SB	Seasonal best

=== Heats ===
Heats weren't performed, as only five teams had entered.

=== Final ===
The final was held on August 20, at 20:06.

Rank	Lane	Name	Nationality	Time	Notes
1st place, gold medalist(s)	5	Natalie Coughlin (54.25); Jessica Hardy (53.43); Amanda Weir (53.85); Dana Vollmer (53.58)	United States	3:35.11	CR
2nd place, silver medalist(s)	4	Yolane Kukla (55.51); Emily Seebohm (53.86); Alicia Coutts (54.34); Felicity Galvez (54.35)	Australia	3:38.06	
3rd place, bronze medalist(s)	2	Victoria Poon (54.46); Julia Wilkinson (54.60); Erica Morningstar (54.73); Genevieve Saumur (54.35)	Canada	3:38.14	
4	3	Haruka Ueda (54.70); Yayoi Matsumoto (54.44); Tomoko Hagiwara (54.94); Hanae Ito (54.78)	Japan	3:38.86	
5	6	Hayley Palmer (56.28); Tash Hind (54.97); Amaka Gessler (55.30); Penny Marshall (55.60)	New Zealand	3:42.15	
