= 2010 FINA World Swimming Championships (25 m) – Women's 4 × 100 metre freestyle relay =

Women's 4 × 100 m Free Relay at the 2010 Short Course Worlds
- Dates: 18 December 2010
- Nations: 17
- Teams: 17
- Winning time: 3:28.54

Medalists
gold medal	Netherlands
silver medal	USA
bronze medal	China

The Women's 4 × 100 Freestyle Relay at the 10th FINA World Swimming Championships (25m) was swum on 18 December 2010 in Dubai, United Arab Emirates. 17 nations had teams swims the preliminary heats, from which the top-8 advanced to the evenings final to swim again.

== Records ==
At the start of the event, the existing World (WR) and Championship records (CR) were as follows.

Type	Nation	Swimmers	Time	Location	Date
WR	Netherlands	Hinkelien Schreuder (52.88); Inge Dekker (52.24); Ranomi Kromowidjojo (52.12); Marleen Veldhuis (50.98)	3:28.22	Amsterdam	19 December 2008
CR	Netherlands	Hinkelien Schreuder (53.62); Femke Heemskerk (52.61); Inge Dekker (51.76); Marleen Veldhuis (51.43)	3:29.42	Manchester 2008	12 April 2008

The following records were established during the competition:

Date	Round	Name	Nation	Time	WR	CR
18 December 2010	Final	Femke Heemskerk (52.33); Inge Dekker (52.47); Hinkelien Schreuder (52.32); Ranomi Kromowidjojo (51.42)	Netherlands	3:28.54		CR

== Results ==
=== Heats ===
Rank	Heat	Lane	Nation	Swimmers	Time	Notes
1	3	4	USA	Kara Lynn Joyce (53.50); Katie Hoff (52.70); Amanda Weir (53.21); Jessica Hardy (52.49)	3:31.90	Q
2	1	4	Australia	Emma McKeon (53.13); Kelly Stubbins (53.51); Kylie Palmer (53.37); Kotuku Ngawati (54.15)	3:34.16	Q
3	3	5	Canada	Victoria Poon (53.55); Geneviève Saumur (53.33); Sinead Russell (54.00); Amanda Reason (53.56)	3:34.44	Q
4	3	3	Netherlands	Inge Dekker (53.23); Hinkelien Schreuder (55.14); Femke Heemskerk (52.77); Ranomi Kromowidjojo (53.43)	3:34.57	Q
5	1	6	China	Pang Jiaying (53.88); Wang Junyao (54.03); Wang Shijia (53.94); Zhu Qianwei (53.24)	3:35.09	Q
6	2	4	Sweden	Ida Varga (54.16); Petra Granlund (53.02); Michelle Coleman (54.33); Gabriella Fagundez (53.90)	3:35.41	Q
7	2	5	Brazil	Tatiana Lemos (54.19); Flávia Delaroli (54.86); Julyana Kury (54.16); Michelle Lenhardt (54.25)	3:37.46	Q
8	1	5	Russia	Veronika Popova (54.16); Margarita Nesterova (53.89); Victoria Malyutina (54.90); Elena Sokolova (54.85)	3:37.80	Q
9	3	7	Norway	Ingvild Snildal (55.11); Cecilie Waage Johanessen (54.34); Monica Waage Johanessen (55.96); Henriette Brekke (55.04)	3:40.45	
10	1	3	Venezuela	Ximena Vilar (57.77); Andreina Pinto (57.42); Eliana Barrios (58.05); Jeserik Pinto (57.41)	3:50.65	
11	2	3	Chinese Taipei	Cheng Wan-Jung (57.54); Chen Ting (56.96); Ting Sheng-Yo (57.34); Chen I-Chuan (58.98)	3:50.82	
12	2	2	Malta	Nicola Muscat (58.28); Talisa Pace (58.68); Melinda Sue Micallef (59.73); Davina Mangion (1:00.67)	3:57.36	
13	2	7	Peru	Andrea Cedron (59.43); Oriele Alejandra Espinoza (59.43); Massie Milagros Carrillo (59.71); Daniela Kaori Miyahara (59.20)	3:57.77	
14	3	6	Macau	Ma Cheok Mei (58.67); Lei On Kei (1:00.85); Tan Chi Yan (1:02.18); Lou Wai Sam (1:00.15)	4:01.85	
15	2	6	Kenya	Sylvia Brunlehner (1:01.81); Sonia Cege (1:06.03); Soraya Oruya (1:05.07); Anham Salyani (1:07.43)	4:20.34	
–	1	2	Nigeria		DNS	
–	3	2	Hungary		DNS	

=== Final ===
Rank	Lane	Nation	Name	Time	Notes
1st place, gold medalist(s)	6	Netherlands	Frederike Heemskerk (52.33); Inge Dekker (52.47); Hinkelien Schreuder (52.32); Ranomi Kromowidjojo (51.42)	3:28.54	CR
2nd place, silver medalist(s)	4	United States	Natalie Coughlin (51.88); Katie Hoff (52.79); Jessica Hardy (53.03); Dana Vollmer (51.64)	3:29.34	
3rd place, bronze medalist(s)	2	China	Tang Yi (52.27); Zhu Qianwei (52.60); Pang Jiaying (52.94); Li Zhesi (52.00)	3:29.81	
4	5	Australia	Emma McKeon (52.63); Felicity Galvez (52.71); Kotuku Ngawati (52.54); Marieke Guehrer (53.04)	3:30.92	
5	7	Sweden	Therese Alshammar (53.23); Sarah Sjöström (52.69); Ida Varga (53.31); Petra Granlund (52.74)	3.31.97	
6	3	Canada	Victoria Poon (53.27); Geneviève Saumur (53.22); Sinead Russell (53.72); Amanda Reason (53.71)	3:33.92	
7	8	Russia	Margarita Nesterova (54.00); Veronika Popova (53.03); Svetlana Fedulova (54.30); Elena Sokolova (54.25)	3:35.58	
8	1	Brazil	Tatiana Lemos (54.12); Flávia Delaroli (53.81); Michelle Lenhardt (54.26); Julyana Kury (53.76)	3:35.95	
