= Swimming at the 2005 World Aquatics Championships =

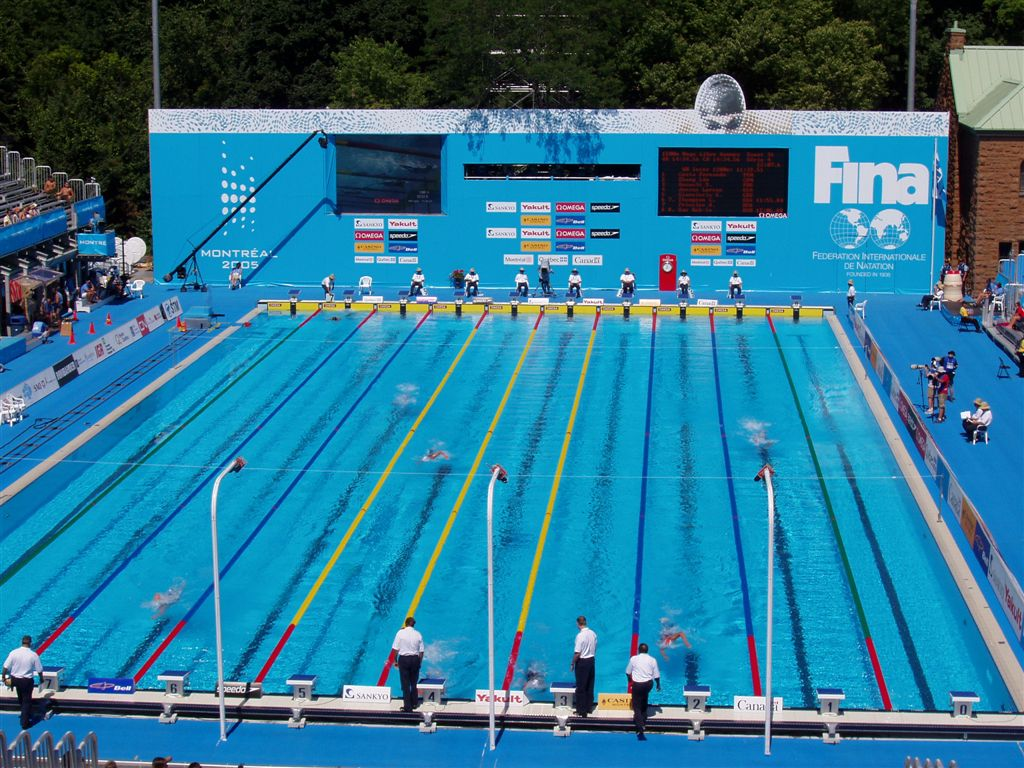
Swimming competition pool from 2005 Worlds.

The Swimming competition at the 11th FINA World Aquatics Championships consisted of 40 long course events, swum July 24–31, 2005 at pools in Parc Jean-Drapeau in Montreal, Quebec, Canada. Swimming's 40 events were split evenly between males and females (20 each) and were:

- freestyle (free): 50, 100, 200, 400, 800 and 1500;
- backstroke (back): 50, 100 and 200;
- breaststroke (breast): 50, 100 and 200;
- butterfly (fly): 50, 100 and 200;
- Individual Medley (IM): 200 and 400; and
- relay: 4 × 100 and 4 × 200 freestyle, and 4 × 100 medley.

== Event schedule ==
| date | Morning session Preliminary heats (9:30 a.m.) | Evening session Finals & semifinals (6:00 p.m.) |
|---|---|---|
| Sunday; July 24 2005 | women's 100 fly men's 400 free women's 200 I.M. men's 50 fly women's 400 free men's 100 breast Swim-off: men's 50 fly women's 4 × 100 free relay men's 4 × 100 free relay | women's 100 fly (semifinals) men's 400 free (final) women's 200 I.M. (semifinals) men's 50 fly (semifinals) women's 400 free (final) men's 100 breast (semifinals) women's 4 × 100 free relay (final) men's 4 × 100 free relay (final) |
| Monday; July 25 2005 | women's 100 back men's 200 free women's 100 breast men's 100 back women's 1500 free | men's 50 fly (final) women's 100 breast (semifinals) men's 100 breast (final) women's 100 fly (final) men's 200 free (semifinals) women's 100 back (semifinals) men's 100 back (semifinals) women's 200 IM (final) |
| Tuesday; July 26 2005 | men's 50 breast men's 200 fly women's 200 free men's 800 free | women's 1500 free (final) men's 50 breast (semifinals) women's 100 back (final) men's 200 fly (semifinals) women's 100 breast (final) men's 100 back (final) women's 200 free (semifinals) men's 200 free (final) |
| Wednesday; July 27 2005 | women's 50 back men's 100 free women's 200 fly men's 200 I.M. | men's 100 free (semifinals) women's 50 back (semifinals) men's 50 breast (finals) women's 200 free (final) men's 200 fly (final) women's 200 fly (semifinals) men's 200 I.M. (semifinals) men's 800 free (final) |
| Thursday; July 28 2005 | women's 100 free men's 200 back women's 200 breast men's 200 breast women's 4 × 200 free relay | women's 100 free (semifinals) men's 200 breast (semifinals) women's 50 back (final) men's 100 free (final) women's 200 fly (final) men's 200 back (semifinals) women's 200 breast (semifinals) men's 200 I.M. (final) women's 4 × 200 free relay (final) |
| Friday; July 29 2005 | women's 50 fly men's 50 free women's 800 free Swim-off: women's 50 fly men's 100 fly women's 200 back Swim-off: men's 50 free men's 4 × 200 free relay | women's 100 free (final) men's 200 back (final) women's 200 back (semifinals) men's 50 free (semifinals) women's 200 breast (final) men's 100 fly (semifinals) women's 50 fly (semifinals) men's 200 breast (final) men's 4 × 200 free relay (final) |
| Saturday; July 30 2005 | women's 50 free men's 50 back women's 50 breast men's 1500 free women's 4 × 100 medley relay | women's 50 fly (final) men's 50 free (final) women's 200 back (final) men's 100 fly (final) women's 50 breast (semifinals) women's 50 free (semifinals) men's 50 back (semifinals) women's 800 free (final) women's 4 × 100 medley relay (final) |
| Sunday; July 31 2005 | men's 400 I.M. women's 400 I.M. men's 4 × 100 medley relay | men's 50 back (final) women's 50 breast (final) men's 400 I.M. (final) women's 50 free (final) men's 1500 free (final) women's 400 I.M. (final) men's 4 × 100 medley relay (final) |

== Results ==
=== Men ===
| Event | Gold | | Silver | | Bronze | |
|---|---|---|---|---|---|---|
| 50 m freestyle | Roland Schoeman; South Africa | 21.69 CR, AF | Duje Draganja; Croatia | 21.89 | Bartosz Kizierowski; Poland | 21.94 |
| 100 m freestyle | Filippo Magnini; Italy | 48.12 CR, NR | Roland Schoeman; South Africa | 48.28 | Ryk Neethling; South Africa | 48.34 |
| 200 m freestyle | Michael Phelps (United States) USA | 1:45.20 AM | Grant Hackett (Australia) AUS | 1:46.14 | Ryk Neethling; South Africa | 1:46.63 |
| 400 m freestyle | Grant Hackett; Australia | 3:42.91 | Yuri Prilukov; Russia | 3:44.44 NR | Oussama Mellouli; Tunisia | 3:46.08 |
| 800 m freestyle | Grant Hackett; Australia | 7:38.65 WR | Larsen Jensen (United States) USA | 7:45.63 AM | Yuri Prilukov; Russia | 7:46.64 ER |
| 1500 m freestyle | Grant Hackett; Australia | 14:42.58 | Larsen Jensen (United States) USA | 14:47.58 | David Davies (United Kingdom) Great Britain | 14:48.11 |
| 50 m backstroke | Aristeidis Grigoriadis; Greece | 24.95 | Matt Welsh; Australia | 24.99 OC | Liam Tancock (United Kingdom) Great Britain | 25.02 |
| 100 m backstroke | Aaron Peirsol (United States) USA | 53.62 | Randall Bal (United States) USA | 54.02 | László Cseh; Hungary | 54.27 |
| 200 m backstroke | Aaron Peirsol (United States) USA | 1:54.66 WR | Markus Rogan; Austria | 1:56.63 | Ryan Lochte (United States) USA | 1:57.00 |
| 50 m breaststroke | Mark Warnecke; Germany | 27.63 | Mark Gangloff (United States) USA | 27.71 | Kosuke Kitajima; Japan | 27.78 |
| 100 m breaststroke | Brendan Hansen (United States) USA | 59.37 CR | Kosuke Kitajima; Japan | 59.53 | Hugues Duboscq; France | 1:00.20 |
| 200 m breaststroke | Brendan Hansen (United States) USA | 2:09.85 | Mike Brown; Canada | 2:11.22 | Genki Imamura; Japan | 2:11.54 |
| 50 m butterfly | Roland Schoeman; South Africa | 22.96 WR | Ian Crocker (United States) USA | 23.12 | Sergiy Breus; Ukraine | 23.38 |
| 100 m butterfly | Ian Crocker (United States) USA | 50.40 WR | Michael Phelps (United States) USA | 51.65 | Andriy Serdinov; Ukraine | 52.08 |
| 200 m butterfly | Paweł Korzeniowski; Poland | 1:55.02 NR | Takeshi Matsuda; Japan | 1:55.62 | Wu Peng; China | 1:56.50 |
| 200 m I.M. | Michael Phelps (United States) USA | 1:56.68 | László Cseh; Hungary | 1:57.61 ER | Ryan Lochte (United States) USA | 1:57.79 |
| 400 m I.M. | László Cseh; Hungary | 4:09.63 ER | Luca Marin; Italy | 4:11.67 | Oussama Mellouli; Tunisia | 4:13.47 AF |
| 4 × 100 m freestyle relay | USA; Michael Phelps (49.17); Neil Walker (47.70); Nate Dusing (48.97); Jason Lezak (47.93) | 3:13.77 CR, AM | Canada; Yannick Lupien (49.88); Rick Say (48.85); Mike Mintenko (49.52); Brent Hayden (48.19) | 3:16.44 | Australia; Michael Klim (49.75); Andrew Mewing (49.04); Leith Brodie (49.82); Patrick Murphy (48.95) | 3:17.56 |
| 4 × 200 m freestyle relay | USA; Michael Phelps (1:45.51); Ryan Lochte (1:48.22); Peter Vanderkaay (1:46.52); Klete Keller (1:46.33) | 7:06.58 AM | Canada; Brent Hayden (1:47.10); Colin Russell (1:48.60); Rick Say (1:46.84); Andrew Hurd (1:47.19) | 7:09.73 NR | Australia; Nicholas Sprenger (1:47.94); Patrick Murphy (1:49.04); Andrew Mewing (1:48.77); Grant Hackett (1:44.84) | 7:10.59 |
| 4 × 100 m medley relay | USA; Aaron Peirsol (54.26); Brendan Hansen (59.33); Ian Crocker (50.39); Jason Lezak (47.87) | 3:31.85 | Russia; Arkady Vyatchanin (54.75); Dmitry Komornikov (59.64); Igor Marchenko (52.16); Andrey Kapralov (48.53) | 3:35.08 | Japan; Tomomi Morita (54.85); Kosuke Kitajima (59.19); Ryo Takayasu (52.48); Daisuke Hosokawa (48.88) | 3:35.40 |

Legend: WR – World record; CR – Championship record

=== Women ===
| Event | Gold | | Silver | | Bronze | |
|---|---|---|---|---|---|---|
| 50 m freestyle | Libby Lenton; Australia | 24.59 | Marleen Veldhuis; Netherlands | 24.83 | Zhu Yingwen; China | 24.91 |
| 100 m freestyle | Jodie Henry; Australia | 54.18 | Malia Metella; France; Natalie Coughlin (United States) USA | 54.74 | none | |
| 200 m freestyle | Solenne Figuès; France | 1:58.60 | Federica Pellegrini; Italy | 1:58.73 | Josefin Lillhage; Sweden; Yang Yu; China | 1:59.08 |
| 400 m freestyle | Laure Manaudou; France | 4:06.44 | Ai Shibata; Japan | 4:06.74 | Caitlin McClatchey (United Kingdom) Great Britain | 4:07.25 |
| 800 m freestyle | Kate Ziegler (United States) USA | 8:25.31 | Brittany Reimer; Canada | 8:27.59 | Ai Shibata; Japan | 8:27.86 |
| 1500 m freestyle | Kate Ziegler (United States) USA | 16:00.41 | Flavia Rigamonti; Switzerland | 16:04.34 | Brittany Reimer; Canada | 16:07.73 |
| 50 m backstroke | Giaan Rooney; Australia | 28.63 | Gao Chang; China | 28.69 | Antje Buschschulte; Germany | 28.72 |
| 100 m backstroke | Kirsty Coventry; Zimbabwe | 1:00.24 | Antje Buschschulte; Germany | 1:00.84 | Natalie Coughlin (United States) USA | 1:00.88 |
| 200 m backstroke | Kirsty Coventry; Zimbabwe | 2:08.52 AF | Margaret Hoelzer (United States) USA | 2:09.94 | Reiko Nakamura; Japan | 2:10.41 |
| 50 m breaststroke | Jade Edmistone; Australia | 30.45 WR | Jessica Hardy (United States) USA | 30.85 | Brooke Hanson; Australia | 30.89 |
| 100 m breaststroke | Leisel Jones; Australia | 1:06.25 OC | Jessica Hardy (United States) USA | 1:06.62 | Tara Kirk (United States) USA | 1:07.43 |
| 200 m breaststroke | Leisel Jones; Australia | 2:21.72 WR | Anne Poleska; Germany | 2:25.84 | Mirna Jukić; Austria | 2:27.11 |
| 50 m butterfly | Danni Miatke; Australia | 26.11 | Anna-Karin Kammerling; Sweden | 26.36 | Therese Alshammar; Sweden | 26.39 |
| 100 m butterfly | Jessicah Schipper; Australia | 57.23 CR, OC | Libby Lenton; Australia | 57.37 | Otylia Jędrzejczak; Poland | 58.57 |
| 200 m butterfly | Otylia Jędrzejczak; Poland | 2:05.61 WR | Jessicah Schipper; Australia | 2:05.65 OC | Yuko Nakanishi; Japan | 2:09.40 |
| 200 m I.M. | Katie Hoff (United States) USA | 2:10.41 CR, AM | Kirsty Coventry; Zimbabwe | 2:11.13 | Lara Carroll; Australia | 2:13.32 |
| 400 m I.M. | Katie Hoff (United States) USA | 4:36.07 CR | Kirsty Coventry; Zimbabwe | 4:39.72 | Kaitlin Sandeno (United States) USA | 4:40.85 |
| 4 × 100 m freestyle relay | Australia; Jodie Henry (54.45); Alice Mills (53.96); Shayne Reese (55.37); Libby Lenton (53.54) | 3:37.32 CR | Germany; Petra Dallmann (55.01); Antje Buschschulte (54.37); Annika Liebs (54.66); Daniela Gotz (54.20) | 3:38.24 | USA; Natalie Coughlin (54.31); Kara Lynn Joyce (55.22); Lacey Nymeyer (54.88); Amanda Weir (53.90) | 3:38.31 |
| 4 × 200 m freestyle relay | USA; Natalie Coughlin (1:58.82); Katie Hoff (1:58.50); Whitney Myers (1:58.81); Kaitlin Sandeno (1:57.57) | 7:53.70 CR | Australia; Libby Lenton (1:57.06) OC; Shayne Reese (2:00.00); Bronte Barratt (1:58.58); Linda Mackenzie (1:58.42) | 7:54.06 OC | China; Zhu Yingwen (1:58.91); Pang Jiaying (1:59.90); Zhou Yafei (1:59.44); Yang Yu (1:59.04) | 7:57.29 |
| 4 × 100 m medley relay | Australia; Sophie Edington (1:01.48); Leisel Jones (1:05.73); Jessicah Schipper (57.13); Libby Lenton (53.13) | 3:57.47 CR | USA; Natalie Coughlin (1:00.00); Jessica Hardy (1:07.70); Rachel Komisarz (57.80); Amanda Weir (54.42) | 3:59.92 | Germany; Antje Buschschulte (1:00.72); Sarah Poewe (1:08.51); Annika Mehlhorn (58.75); Daniela Gotz (54.53) | 4:02.51 |

=== Medal standings ===
* Host nation (Canada)

| Rank | Nation | Gold | Silver | Bronze | Total |
|---|---|---|---|---|---|
| 1 | United States (USA) | 15 | 11 | 6 | 32 |
| 2 | Australia (AUS) | 13 | 5 | 4 | 22 |
| 3 | Zimbabwe (ZIM) | 2 | 2 | 0 | 4 |
| 4 | South Africa (RSA) | 2 | 1 | 2 | 5 |
| 5 | France (FRA) | 2 | 1 | 1 | 4 |
| 6 | Poland (POL) | 2 | 0 | 2 | 4 |
| 7 | Germany (GER) | 1 | 3 | 2 | 6 |
| 8 | Italy (ITA) | 1 | 2 | 0 | 3 |
| 9 | Hungary (HUN) | 1 | 1 | 1 | 3 |
| 10 | Greece (GRE) | 1 | 0 | 0 | 1 |
| 11 | Canada (CAN)* | 0 | 4 | 1 | 5 |
| 12 | Japan (JPN) | 0 | 3 | 6 | 9 |
| 13 | Russia (RUS) | 0 | 2 | 1 | 3 |
| 14 | China (CHN) | 0 | 1 | 4 | 5 |
| 15 | Sweden (SWE) | 0 | 1 | 2 | 3 |
| 16 | Austria (AUT) | 0 | 1 | 1 | 2 |
| 17 | Croatia (CRO) | 0 | 1 | 0 | 1 |
| 17 | Netherlands (NED) | 0 | 1 | 0 | 1 |
| 17 | Switzerland (SUI) | 0 | 1 | 0 | 1 |
| 20 | Great Britain (GBR) | 0 | 0 | 3 | 3 |
| 21 | Tunisia (TUN) | 0 | 0 | 2 | 2 |
| 21 | Ukraine (UKR) | 0 | 0 | 2 | 2 |
| Totals (22 entries) | | 40 | 41 | 40 | 121 |

== Records ==
The following world and championship records were set during the competition.

=== World records ===
| Date | Round | Event | Time | Name | Nation |
|---|---|---|---|---|---|
| July 24 | Semifinal 1 | Men's 50 metre butterfly | 23.01 | Roland Schoeman | South Africa |
| July 25 | Final | Men's 50 metre butterfly | 22.96 | Roland Schoeman | South Africa |
| July 25 | Semifinal 1 | Women's 100 metre breaststroke | 1:06.20 | Jessica Hardy | United States |
| July 27 | Final | Men's 800 metre freestyle | 7:38.65 | Grant Hackett | Australia |
| July 28 | Final | Women's 200 metre butterfly | 2:05.61 | Otylia Jędrzejczak | Poland |
| July 29 | Final | Men's 200 metre backstroke | 1:54.66 | Aaron Peirsol | United States |
| July 29 | Final | Women's 200 metre breaststroke | 2:21.72 | Leisel Jones | Australia |
| July 30 | Final | Men's 100 metre butterfly | 50.40 | Ian Crocker | United States |
| July 31 | Final | Women's 50 metre breaststroke | 30.45 | Jade Edmistone | Australia |

=== Championship records ===
| Date | Round | Event | Time | Name | Nation |
|---|---|---|---|---|---|
| July 24 | Heat 6 | Women's 100 metre butterfly | 57.91 | Jessicah Schipper | Australia |
| July 24 | Heat 12 | Men's 100 metre breaststroke | 59.71 | Kosuke Kitajima | Japan |
| July 24 | Semifinal 2 | Women's 100 metre butterfly | 57.75 | Jessicah Schipper | Australia |
| July 24 | Final | Women's 4 × 100 metre freestyle relay | 3:37.32 | Jodie Henry (54.45); Alice Mills (53.96); Shayne Reese (55.37); Libby Lenton (54.56) | Australia |
| July 24 | Final | Men's 4 × 100 metre freestyle relay | 3:13.77 | Michael Phelps (49.17); Neil Walker (47.70); Nate Dusing (48.97); Jason Lezak (47.93) | United States |
| July 25 | Final | Men's 100 metre breaststroke | 59.37 | Brendan Hansen | United States |
| July 25 | Final | Women's 100 metre butterfly | 57.23 | Jessicah Schipper | Australia |
| July 25 | Final | Women's 200 metre individual medley | 2:10.41 | Katie Hoff | United States |
| July 27 | Semifinal 2 | Women's 50 metre backstroke | 28.31 | Gao Chang | China |
| July 28 | Final | Men's 100 metre freestyle | 48.12 | Filippo Magnini | Italy |
| July 28 | Final | Women's 4 × 200 metre freestyle relay | 7:53.70 | Natalie Coughlin (1:58.82); Katie Hoff (1:58.50); Whitney Myers (1:58.81); Kaitlin Sandeno (1:57.57) | United States |
| July 30 | Final | Men's 50 metre freestyle | 21.69 | Roland Schoeman | South Africa |
| July 30 | Semifinal 2 | Women's 50 metre breaststroke | 30.61 | Jade Edmistone | Australia |
| July 30 | Final | Women's 4 × 100 metre medley relay | 3:57.47 | Sophie Edington (1:01.48); Leisel Jones (1:05.73); Jessicah Schipper (57.13); Libby Lenton (53.13) | Australia |
| July 31 | Final | Women's 400 metre individual medley | 4:36.07 | Katie Hoff | United States |

== See also ==
- List of World Championships records in swimming
- Swimming at the 2003 World Aquatics Championships (previous Worlds)
- Swimming at the 2004 Summer Olympics (previous year)
- Swimming at the 2007 World Aquatics Championships (subsequent Worlds)
