= Dana Vollmer =

American swimmer (born 1987)

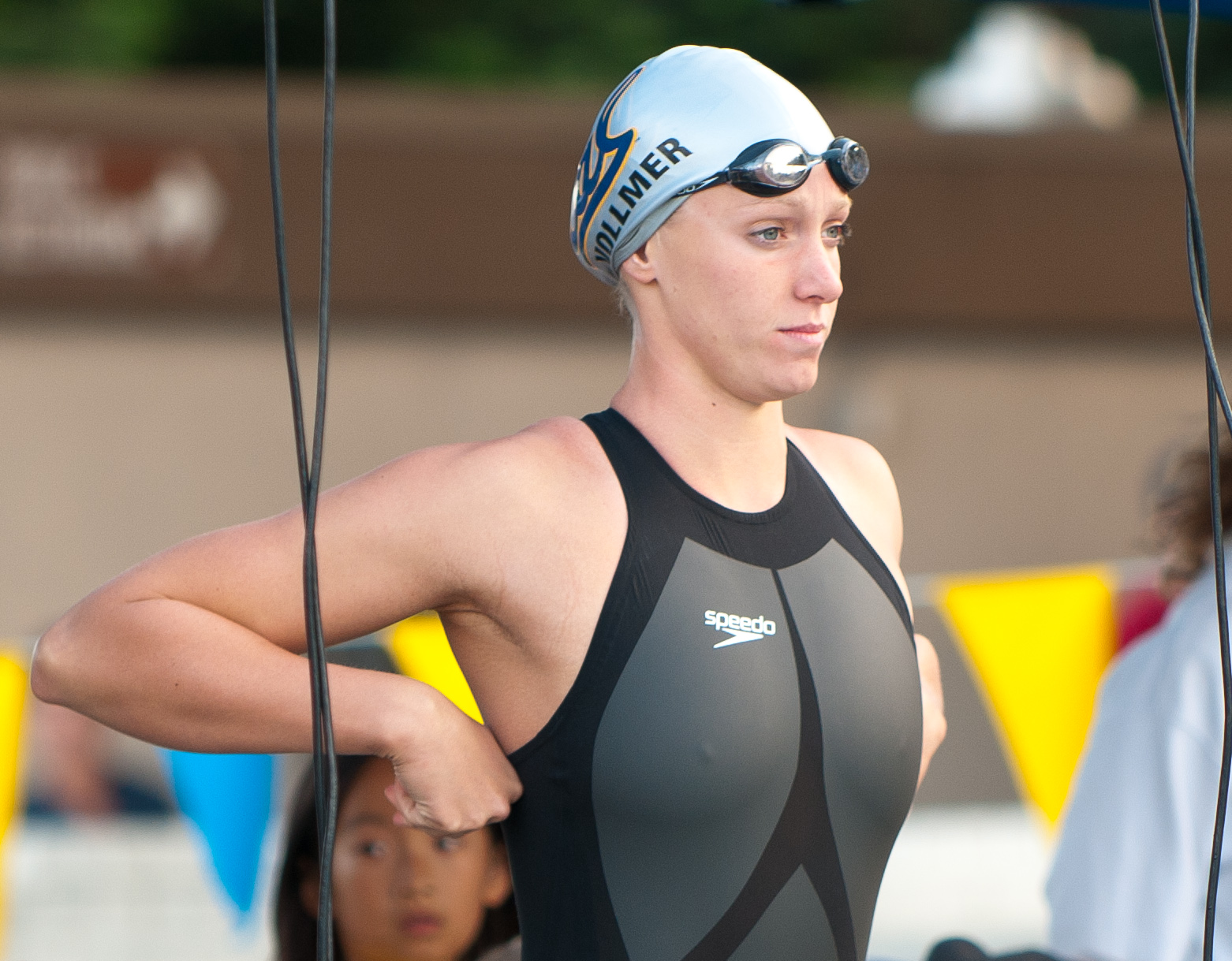
- Vollmer in 2009

Personal information
- Full name: Dana Whitney Vollmer
- National team: United States
- Born: November 13, 1987 (age 38) Syracuse, New York, U.S.
- Height: 6 ft 1 in (185 cm)
- Weight: 150 lb (68 kg)
- Website: www.danavollmer.com

Sport
- Sport: Swimming
- Strokes: Butterfly, freestyle
- Club: California Aquatics
- College team: University of California, Berkeley; University of Florida
Medal record
Women's swimming
Representing United States
Event	1st	2nd	3rd
Olympic Games	5	1	1
World Championships (LC)	4	4	2
World Championships (SC)	2	2	2
Goodwill Games	0	0	1
Pan Pacific Championships	5	1	0
Pan American Games	3	0	0
Universiade	1	1	0
Total	20	9	6
Olympic Games
Gold medal – first place	2004 Athens	4×200 m freestyle
Gold medal – first place	2012 London	100 m butterfly
Gold medal – first place	2012 London	4×200 m freestyle
Gold medal – first place	2012 London	4×100 m medley
Gold medal – first place	2016 Rio de Janeiro	4×100 m medley
Silver medal – second place	2016 Rio de Janeiro	4×100 m freestyle
Bronze medal – third place	2016 Rio de Janeiro	100 m butterfly
World Championships (LC)
Gold medal – first place	2007 Melbourne	4×200 m freestyle
Gold medal – first place	2011 Shanghai	100 m butterfly
Gold medal – first place	2011 Shanghai	4×100 m medley
Gold medal – first place	2013 Barcelona	4×100 m medley
Silver medal – second place	2007 Melbourne	4×100 m freestyle
Silver medal – second place	2007 Melbourne	4×100 m medley
Silver medal – second place	2009 Rome	4×200 m freestyle
Silver medal – second place	2011 Shanghai	4×100 m freestyle
Bronze medal – third place	2009 Rome	200 m freestyle
Bronze medal – third place	2013 Barcelona	100 m butterfly
World Championships (SC)
Gold medal – first place	2004 Indianapolis	4×100 m freestyle
Gold medal – first place	2004 Indianapolis	4×200 m freestyle
Silver medal – second place	2010 Dubai	4×100 m freestyle
Silver medal – second place	2010 Dubai	4×100 m medley
Bronze medal – third place	2004 Indianapolis	200 m freestyle
Bronze medal – third place	2010 Dubai	100 m butterfly
Pan Pacific Championships
Gold medal – first place	2006 Victoria	4×200 m freestyle
Gold medal – first place	2010 Irvine	100 m butterfly
Gold medal – first place	2010 Irvine	4×100 m freestyle
Gold medal – first place	2010 Irvine	4×200 m freestyle
Gold medal – first place	2010 Irvine	4×100 m medley
Silver medal – second place	2010 Irvine	100 m freestyle
Pan American Games
Gold medal – first place	2003 Sto Domingo	200 m freestyle
Gold medal – first place	2003 Sto Domingo	4×200 m freestyle
Gold medal – first place	2003 Sto Domingo	4×100 m medley
Universiade
Gold medal – first place	2005 Izmir	4×100 m freestyle
Silver medal – second place	2005 Izmir	50 m butterfly
Goodwill Games
Bronze medal – third place	2001 Brisbane	4×100 m medley

Dana Whitney Vollmer (born November 13, 1987) is a former American competition swimmer, five-time Olympic gold medalist, and former world record-holder. At the 2004 Summer Olympics, she won a gold medal as a member of the winning United States team in the 4×200-meter freestyle relay that set the world record in the event. Eight years later at the 2012 Summer Olympics, Vollmer set the world record on her way to the gold medal in the 100-meter butterfly, and also won golds in the 4×100-meter medley relay and 4×200-meter freestyle relay. She won three medals including a gold at the 2016 Summer Olympics in Rio de Janeiro.

Vollmer won a total of thirty two medals in major international competitions, including nineteen gold medals, eight silver, and five bronze, spanning the Olympics, the World Championships, the Pan American Games, the Pan Pacific Championships, and the Goodwill Games, making her one of the most decorated female Olympians in swimming.

== Early years ==
Vollmer was born in Syracuse, New York, and raised in the Dallas-Fort Worth Metroplex region in Granbury, Texas. As an age group swimmer, Vollmer swam for coach Ron Forrest at the Fort Worth Area Swim Team (FAST).

In 2003, Vollmer underwent heart surgery to correct a condition called supraventricular tachycardia, which produces a quickened pulse rate of about 240 beats per minute. After that surgery, an electrocardiogram indicated to her cardiologists that she might have Long QT syndrome. Further testing ruled out the condition. Her physicians recommended that she always have a defibrillator at the poolside whenever she swims in case of a heart emergency.

== College career ==
Vollmer first enrolled in the University of Florida, and swam for the Florida Gators swimming and diving team under coach Gregg Troy in 2006. As a freshman, she earned four honorable mention All-American honors. After her first year, she transferred to the University of California, Berkeley, where she finished her NCAA career competing for the California Golden Bears swimming and diving team under coach Teri McKeever from 2007 to 2009. Vollmer was the Golden Bears' most valuable swimmer for three consecutive years, the Pac-10 Swimmer of the Year in 2009, and the 2008–09 recipient of the Honda Sports Award for Swimming and Diving, recognizing her as the outstanding college female swimmer of the year. She earned 20 All-American honors as a Golden Bear swimmer, won individual NCAA championships in the 100-yard butterfly in 2007 and 100-yard and 200-yard freestyles in 2009, and led the Golden Bears to their first NCAA team championship in 2009.

== Swimming career ==
=== Early career ===
At the age of 12, Vollmer was the youngest swimmer to compete at the 2000 U.S. Olympic Trials, but did not qualify for the U.S. Olympic team. She was also the youngest swimming competitor a year later at the 2001 Goodwill Games.

=== 2004 Summer Olympics ===
At the 2004 Summer Olympics in Athens, Greece, Vollmer won a gold medal as a member of the winning U.S. team in 4×200-meter freestyle relay, together with Natalie Coughlin, Carly Piper and Kaitlin Sandeno. In addition to winning the gold medal, the U.S. relay team broke the previous world record in the event that had stood for 17 years.

=== 2005–2008 ===
At the 2007 World Aquatics Championships, Vollmer won a gold medal in the 4×200-meter freestyle relay. She also won the silver medal in the 4×100-meter freestyle relay and 4×100-meter medley relay.

Vollmer just missed making the 2008 Olympic team, placing seventh at the 2008 US Olympic Trials in the 200-meter freestyle with 1:58.67, 0.51 seconds behind the 6th-place finisher, 5th in the 100-meter butterfly with 58.64, and 9th in the 100-meter freestyle with 54.84, 0.03 seconds behind 8th place qualifier Amanda Weir.

=== 2009–2011 ===
On February 25, 2009, Vollmer set her first individual American record, breaking Natalie Coughlin's 200-yard freestyle record with a time of 1:41.53.

At the 2009 World Championships in Rome, Italy, Vollmer won two medals, a silver and a bronze. In the 200-meter freestyle, Vollmer set an American record in the semi-final with a time of 1:55.29. In the final of the 200-meter freestyle, Vollmer placed third, and her American record was broken by Allison Schmitt. In the 4×200-meter freestyle relay, Vollmer swam the leadoff leg in 1:55.29. The American team finished in second place behind China with a time of 7:42.56.

At the 2011 World Aquatics Championships in Shanghai, Vollmer won a total of three medals, two gold medals and one silver. In her first event, the 4×100-meter freestyle relay, Vollmer won a silver medal with Natalie Coughlin, Jessica Hardy, and Missy Franklin. After setting the national record in the semi-finals of the 100-meter butterfly (56.47), Vollmer won the gold medal in the final with a time of 56.87. In the 4×100-meter medley relay, Vollmer the gold medal along with Natalie Coughlin, Rebecca Soni, and Missy Franklin with a time of 3:52.36, better than three seconds ahead of second-place finisher China. Swimming the butterfly leg, Vollmer had a split of 55.74. The final time of 3:52.36 for the medley relay was the second-fastest mark of all time, just behind the Chinese-held world record of 3:52.19.

=== 2012 Summer Olympics ===
2012 Olympics
Gold medal – first place	2012 London	100 m butterfly
Gold medal – first place	2012 London	4×200 m freestyle
Gold medal – first place	2012 London	4×100 m medley

At the 2012 United States Olympic Trials, the U.S. qualifying meet for the Olympics, Vollmer qualified for the U.S. Olympic team for the second time by finishing first in the 100-meter butterfly and third in the 200-meter freestyle. In the final race of the 100-meter butterfly, Vollmer won in a time of 56.50 seconds, better than one second ahead of second-place Claire Donahue. In the semi-final, Vollmer had broken her own American record of 56.47 with her time of 56.42. Vollmer also competed in the 100-meter freestyle, but just missed a spot on the 4×100-meter freestyle relay by finishing seventh (54.61).

At the 2012 Summer Olympics in London, she again broke her American record and set an Olympic record with a time of 56.25 seconds in her 100-meter butterfly qualifying heat. In the 100-meter butterfly final, she won the gold medal and set a new world record with her time of 55.98. Vollmer also competed in the 4×200-meter freestyle relay. She swam the second leg with a time of 1:56.02, as the U.S. team won gold with a time of 7:42.92. In her final event, the 4×100-meter medley relay, Vollmer won another gold with Missy Franklin, Rebecca Soni and Allison Schmitt. Swimming the butterfly leg, Vollmer recorded a split time of 55.48, as the U.S. team set a new world record with a time of 3:52.05, bettering the previous record of 3:52.19 set by China in 2009.

=== 2016 Summer Olympics ===
2016 Olympics
Gold medal – first place	4×100 m medley relay	3:53.13
Silver medal – second place	4×100 m freestyle relay	3:31.89 (AR)
Bronze medal – third place	100 m butterfly	56.63

At the 2016 United States Olympic Trials, the U.S. qualifying meet for the Rio Olympics, Vollmer qualified for the U.S. Olympic team for the third time by finishing second in the 100-meter butterfly. In the final race of the 100-meter butterfly, she swam a time of 57.21 seconds, finishing behind Kelsi Worrell. Vollmer also qualified for the 4x100 meter freestyle relay by touching sixth in the individual 100 meter freestyle.

At the 2016 Summer Olympics in Rio, she won a bronze medal in the 100-meter butterfly with a time of 56.63. Vollmer also competed in the 4×100-meter freestyle relay the same night, in which she swam the third leg with a split of 53.18. The U.S. team of her, Simone Manuel, Abbey Weitzeil, and Katie Ledecky won silver with an American record time of 3:31.89. She also swam in the 4 x 100-meter medley relay, helping the US team win the gold medal. Her gold in the medley relay was the 1,000th gold medal for the US at the summer Olympics.

=== 2017 ===
On 13 April 2017 Vollmer competed in the Women's 50 Free of the 2017 Arena Pro Swim Series Indy while six months pregnant. She participated in preparation for the 2020 Tokyo Olympics; time and placing was not important to her. She finished 55th in 27.59". She announced by wearing a green TYR techsuit that her second child would be a boy. On July 4, 2017 Vollmer gave birth to their second child Ryker Alexander Grant .

=== 2019 ===
On July 30, 2019, Vollmer announced her retirement from competitive swimming, stating that her last swim would be the 100 meter butterfly at the 2019 Phillips 66 National Swimming Championships in Stanford, California.

== Life outside swimming ==
Vollmer is an ambassador for the American Heart Association's "Go Red for Women" program.

She is married to Andy Grant, a former swimmer for Stanford University. The couple announced they were expecting their first child on October 10, 2014, and she gave birth on March 6, 2015 to baby boy Arlen Jackson Grant. Andy and Dana announced on January 13, 2017, that they are expecting a second child due July 2017. On July 4, 2017, she gave birth to their second son, Ryker Alexander Grant.

== Personal best times ==
=== Long course ===
Event	Time	Venue	Date	Notes
50 m butterfly	25.80	Charlotte	May 12, 2012	
100 m butterfly	55.98	London	July 29, 2012	Former WR, AM, NR
200 m butterfly	2:09.86	Indianapolis	March 31, 2012	
50 m freestyle	25.09	Indianapolis	March 4, 2011	
100 m freestyle	53.30	Rome	July 31, 2009	
200 m freestyle	1:55.29	Rome	July 28, 2009	

=== Short course ===
Event	Time	Venue	Date	Notes
50 m butterfly	25.83	Dubai	December 16, 2010	
100 m butterfly	55.59	Berlin	October 30, 2010	Former NR
100 m freestyle	52.58	Dubai	December 16, 2010	

== See also ==
- List of multiple Olympic gold medalists
- List of Olympic medalists in swimming (women)
- List of Pan American Games records in swimming
- List of United States records in swimming
- List of University of California, Berkeley alumni
- List of World Aquatics Championships medalists in swimming (women)
- List of world records in swimming
- World record progression 100 metres butterfly
- World record progression 4 × 100 metres medley relay
- World record progression 4 × 200 metres freestyle relay

Records
Preceded by Sarah Sjöström	Women's 100-meter butterfly world record-holder (long course); July 29, 2012 – August 2, 2015	Succeeded by Sarah Sjöström
