= Jessica Hardy =

American swimmer (born 1987)

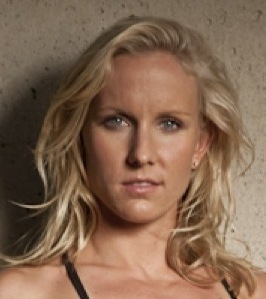

Personal information
- Full name: Jessica Adele Hardy Meichtry
- National team: United States
- Born: March 12, 1987 (age 39) Orange, California, U.S.
- Height: 6 ft 0 in (183 cm)
- Spouse: Dominik Meichtry
- Children: 2
- Website: JessicaHardy.net

Sport
- Sport: Swimming
- Strokes: breaststroke, freestyle
- Club: Irvine Novaquatics; Golden West Swim Club; Trojan Swim Club (TSC)
- College team: University of California at Berkeley
- Coach: Dave Salo (Novaquatics, Trojan SC); Teri McKeever (U. Cal Berkeley); Mark Schubert (Golden West)
Medal record
Representing the United States
Event	1st	2nd	3rd
Olympic Games	1	0	1
World Championships (LC)	3	5	2
World Championships (SC)	4	3	2
Pan Pacific Championships	6	1	0
Total	14	9	5
Olympic Games
Gold medal – first place	2012 London	4×100 m medley
Bronze medal – third place	2012 London	4×100 m freestyle
World Championships (LC)
Gold medal – first place	2007 Melbourne	50 m breaststroke
Gold medal – first place	2011 Shanghai	50 m breaststroke
Gold medal – first place	2013 Barcelona	4×100 m medley
Silver medal – second place	2005 Montreal	50 m breaststroke
Silver medal – second place	2005 Montreal	100 m breaststroke
Silver medal – second place	2005 Montreal	4×100 m medley
Silver medal – second place	2007 Melbourne	4×100 m medley
Silver medal – second place	2011 Shanghai	4×100 m freestyle
Bronze medal – third place	2013 Barcelona	50 m breaststroke
Bronze medal – third place	2013 Barcelona	100 m breaststroke
World Championships (SC)
Gold medal – first place	2008 Manchester	50 m breaststroke
Gold medal – first place	2008 Manchester	100 m breaststroke
Gold medal – first place	2008 Manchester	4×100 m medley
Gold medal – first place	2012 Istanbul	4×100 m freestyle
Silver medal – second place	2006 Shanghai	4×100 m medley
Silver medal – second place	2010 Dubai	4×100 m freestyle
Silver medal – second place	2010 Dubai	4×100 m medley
Bronze medal – third place	2006 Shanghai	50 m breaststroke
Bronze medal – third place	2012 Istanbul	4×100 m medley
Pan Pacific Championships
Gold medal – first place	2006 Victoria	4×100 m medley
Gold medal – first place	2010 Irvine	50 m freestyle
Gold medal – first place	2010 Irvine	50 m breaststroke
Gold medal – first place	2010 Irvine	4×100 m freestyle
Gold medal – first place	2010 Irvine	4×100 m medley
Gold medal – first place	2014 Gold Coast	100 m breaststroke
Silver medal – second place	2014 Gold Coast	4×100 m medley

Jessica Adele Hardy Meichtry (born March 12, 1987) is an American competitive swimmer who specializes in breaststroke and freestyle events. Hardy earned a bronze medal in the 4×100-meter freestyle and a gold medal in the 4×100-meter medley relays at the 2012 Summer Olympics.

She has won a total of twenty-eight medals in major international competition, fourteen gold, nine silver, and five bronze spanning the Olympics, World and the Pan Pacific Championships.

From 2008 to 2009, Hardy served a 12 month suspension from swimming competition due to an anti-doping rule violation at the 2008 Olympic Trials. She returned to competition in 2009, setting new long course world records in the 50-meter breaststroke and 100-meter breaststroke at the 2009 U.S. Open Swimming Championships.

== Early life ==
Hardy was born in Orange, California, on March 12, 1987, the daughter of George Hardy and Denise Robinson. Her mother swam in college for Indiana State University for one week and is currently a psychotherapist. Jessica is a 2005 graduate of Wilson Classical High School in Long Beach and was Swimming World's Female High School Swimmer of the Year in 2004 and 2005. In High School she participated in several sports. Hardy swam for the Seal Beach Swim Club, but at 16 transferred to the larger and more competitive Irvine Novaquatics program in April 2003, where she was managed and trained by Hall of Fame Head Coach Dave Salo. She remained with the Novaquatics through her high school years.

=== Wilson High swimmer ===
Representing Wilson Classical High at the Southern Section Division I Championships, in May 2005, Hardy became the first High School student to go under the minute for the 100-yard breaststroke event with a time of 59.20. At Wilson, she swam for Coach Maggie Twinem. Twinem coached the girls swimming team at Wilson Classical High's strong program for 29 years, leading the program to two CIF Southern Section team championships, which included Jessica's 2005 championship. Wilson High's women's team also won consecutive Moore League titles under Coach Twinem from 2001-2005, during Hardy's tenure as a member of the team.

Hardy held a fourth place world ranking in the 100-meter breaststroke event in 2005. Swimming for Wilson High School in 2005, she swam the breaststroke leg of a 200-meter medley relay that won the CIF Division I title with a time of 1:43.84. At the same CIF championship, Hardy also won the 200-meter individual medley with a time of 2:01.68, and swam last as part of a 4x100 freestyle relay team that placed second at the championship with a 3:32.39. Her efforts at the championship helped her Wilson Classical swim team win the CIF team championship for Division I for the first time since 1995.

== Collegiate era ==
Hardy attended the University of California, Berkeley, where she competed for coach Teri McKeever's California Golden Bears swim team for two years. She was a four-time NCAA Champion, and met her husband Dominik Meichtry, a Swiss swimmer and 3-time Olympian, at Berkeley. She gave up her eligibility and turned professional in 2007, to train with the Trojan Swim Club part of the University of Southern California (USC) with Trojan Club coach Dave Salo, her former High School coach at the Novaquatics. Salo started as a USC and Trojan Swim Club Coach in 2006. In 2016, she announced that she would now be training with former University of Southern California Women's swim coach Mark Schubert, at the Golden West Swim Club in Huntington Beach, CA. Schubert received International Swimming Hall of Fame Honors in 1997.

She married Dominik Meichtry on October 5, 2013. In September 2017, the couple announced that they were expecting their first child, to be born in the spring of 2018, and the couple later had a second child.

=== Arizona State University ===
Enrolling in 2014, primarily as an online student, she completed her Bachelors of Science degree from Arizona State University in 2016, with a focus on Communications. Her online status accommodated her demanding training program.

In 2015, she released an autobiography, titled Swimming Toward the Gold Lining: How Jessica Hardy Turned Her Wounds Into Wisdom. The book "covers her journey from trials to triumph, from wounds to wisdom, and from setbacks to comebacks. You know her name, but you won’t know her true story until you’ve read [the] book."

== 2005–08 ==
At the 2005 World Aquatics Championships, a long course meet, Hardy competed in two individual breaststroke events and in the 4×100-meter medley relay. She won silver in all of those events. Hardy broke Leisel Jones' world record in the semifinals of the 100-meter breaststroke on July 25 before ultimately finishing second in the finals two days later. In the 4×100-meter medley relay, on July 30, Hardy won a silver medal with Natalie Coughlin, Rachel Komisarz, and Amanda Weir. On July 31, Hardy placed second in the 50-meter breaststroke, finishing behind Jade Edmistone of Australia.

At the 2006 Short Course World Championships in Shanghai, Hardy competed in two individual breaststroke events and swam in the heats of the 4×100-meter medley relay. At the conclusion of the meet, she won a silver and bronze medal. In the 50-meter breaststroke on April 6, Hardy won a bronze medal, finishing behind Jade Edmistone and Brooke Hanson of Australia. Hardy then competed in the heats of the 4×100-meter medley relay (with Mary Mohler, Elaine Breeden, and Amanda Weir) on April 7, and won a silver medal after the United States placed second in the finals. On April 8, Hardy finished in fourth place in the 100-meter breaststroke.

At the 2007 World Aquatics Championships, a long course meet, Hardy competed in two individual breaststroke events and in the 4×100-meter medley relay. She won a gold and silver medal at this competition. In her first event, the 100-meter breaststroke, on March 27, Hardy placed fourth. Hardy then swam in the heats of the 4×100-meter medley relay (with Leila Vaziri, Dana Vollmer, and Amanda Weir) on March 31, and won a silver medal after the United States placed second in the finals. On April 1, Hardy won the gold in the 50-meter breaststroke.

At the 2008 Short Course World Championships in Manchester, England, Hardy won a total of three gold medals. In her first event, the 50-meter breaststroke, on April 10, Hardy won gold with a world record time of 29.58. In the 4×100-meter medley, on April 11, Hardy teamed with Margaret Hoelzer, Rachel Komisarz, and Kara Denby to win gold in a world record time of 3:51.36. Going into the final of the 100-meter breaststroke, Hardy was the clear favorite for gold. She topped the heats with a time of 1:05.31 and broke the championship record in the semifinals with a time of 1:04.63 both on April 11. In the final of the 100-meter breaststroke, on April 12, Hardy won gold with a time of 1:04.22, and broke her own championship record.

== 2008 Olympic trial drug test ban ==
At the 2008 U.S. Olympic Team Trials, Hardy qualified for the USA Olympic Team. A few weeks later, on July 23, 2008, Hardy was notified that the second of her three tests from the Trials came back as positive for low levels of clenbuterol; this notification subsequently leaked to the media. Her attorney confirmed on July 24, 2008, that Hardy's "A" and "B" samples from a test administered on July 4 were positive for clenbuterol.

Hardy claimed innocence and said she had never even heard of clenbuterol. Media coverage of the issue noted that tainted supplements have played a part in some previous instances of bans, and this was the case this time as well. A tainted supplement occurred with American swimmer Kicker Vencill, who won a lawsuit against a company that provided him with tainted supplements that resulted in a positive test and two-year ban from the sport. Under both American and international regulations, a lack of knowledge of the source of the substance ingested is not considered to be a defense against a positive result.

On August 1, 2008, following Hardy's hearing before the United States Anti-Doping Agency (USADA), USADA released a statement stating, "The U.S. Anti-Doping Agency (USADA) announced today that U.S. swimmer, Jessica Hardy, of Long Beach, CA, tested positive for the prohibited substance clenbuterol at the U.S. Olympic Trials on July 4, 2008, and has agreed to withdraw from the 2008 United States Olympic Team in the best interests of the team." On August 1, 2008, Hardy officially, and voluntarily, left the 2008 U.S. Olympic Team. In May 2009, it was announced that Hardy would be banned from the sport for one year for the positive test.

On May 21, 2010, the Court of Arbitration for Sport (CAS) agreed with the 2009 decision of the American Arbitration Association and dismissed the appeal by WADA (the World Anti-Doping Agency) to increase the suspension from one to two years. However, CAS did not entertain Hardy's request to have the International Olympic Committee join this arbitration nor her request to make a recommendation on her eligibility for the 2012 London Olympic Games. In April 2012, it was announced that Hardy would be eligible for the 2012 Olympics.

== 2009 comeback ==
Hardy returned from her suspension on August 5, at the U.S. Open National Championships. On August 6, she broke Yuliya Yefimova's world record in the 50-meter breaststroke (long course) with a time of 29.95 to become the first woman under 30 seconds in the event. On August 7, Hardy lowered the world record for the 100-meter breaststroke with a time of 1:04.45. En route to this world record, she also lowered her own world record in the 50-meter breaststroke with a time of 29.80.

At the World Cup on October 17, Hardy broke her own 50-meter breaststroke (short course) record set in April 2008 with a time of 29.45. On November 7, Hardy again bettered her own world record in the 50-meter breaststroke (short course) with a time of 29.36. On November 12, Hardy broke her own world record for the third time with a 28.96, the first woman to go sub 29 in the 50-meter short course breaststroke. On November 15, Hardy bettered her record for the fourth time with a time of 28.80, 0.16 seconds faster than her previous record. Hardy was the overall winner in the female division for the 2009 FINA Swimming World Cup. She received $100,000 in prize money for her efforts.

== 2010 ==
=== 2010 National Championships ===
At the 2010 National Championships, Hardy made the American team that competed at the 2010 Pan Pacific Swimming Championships after finishing second in the 100-meter freestyle. On August 5, despite being the world record holder in the 100-meter breaststroke, Hardy finished in seventh place with a time of 1:09.24. At the first 50, Hardy came in first in 30.92, but faded badly at the end. Hardy did not blame her poor performances on her physical condition but rather her mental state. On her final chance of making the team, on August 7, Hardy finished in second place in the 100-meter freestyle in 54.14, a personal best for her. After the competition, Hardy said, "I've been struggling so much with the pressure I put on myself, especially in the 100 [meter] breaststroke."

=== 2010 Pan Pacific Swimming Championships ===
Going into the 2010 Pan Pacific Swimming Championships, Hardy said her only goal was to have fun. Hardy competed in two individual freestyle events (the 50-meter and 100-meter freestyle), the 50-meter butterfly, the 50-meter breaststroke, and in the 4×100-meter medley and freestyle relays. She went on to win four gold medals. On the first day of competition, on August 18, Hardy competed in the 50-meter butterfly and finished in sixth place. On the second day of competition, on August 19, Hardy didn't qualify to swim in the 100 m freestyle A final and had to compete in the B final. In the 100-meter freestyle B final, she finished first with a time of 54.16. On the third day of competition, on August 20, Hardy won gold in the 50-meter breaststroke and the 4×100-meter freestyle relay. In the 50-meter breaststroke, Hardy won gold in a time of 30.03. Less than an hour later, Hardy competed in the 4×100-meter freestyle relay with Natalie Coughlin, Amanda Weir and Dana Vollmer. As the second leg of the relay, Hardy had a 53.43 split, the fastest in the field. The next day, on August 21, Hardy competed in both the 50-meter freestyle and the 4×100-meter medley relay. In the 50-meter freestyle, Hardy won gold in a championship record time of 24.63, just ahead of Amanda Weir who recorded a time of 24.70. Hardy then competed in the 4×100-meter medley relay with Natalie Coughlin, Dana Vollmer and Rebecca Soni. As the freestyle leg, Hardy recorded a time of 53.12 and the American team went on to win the gold medal in a time of 3:55.23.

== 2011 World Championships ==
Hardy won the 50-meter breaststroke at the 2011 World Championships in Shanghai, China. She swam the race in 30.19 seconds, beating defending champion and training partner Yuliya Efimova by 0.3 seconds. It was her first win in the event since 2007. After qualifying from the 50-meter freestyle heats with the joint fastest time, she finished eighth in the final. She also won a silver medal with the 4x100-meter freestyle relay.

== 2012 Summer Olympics ==
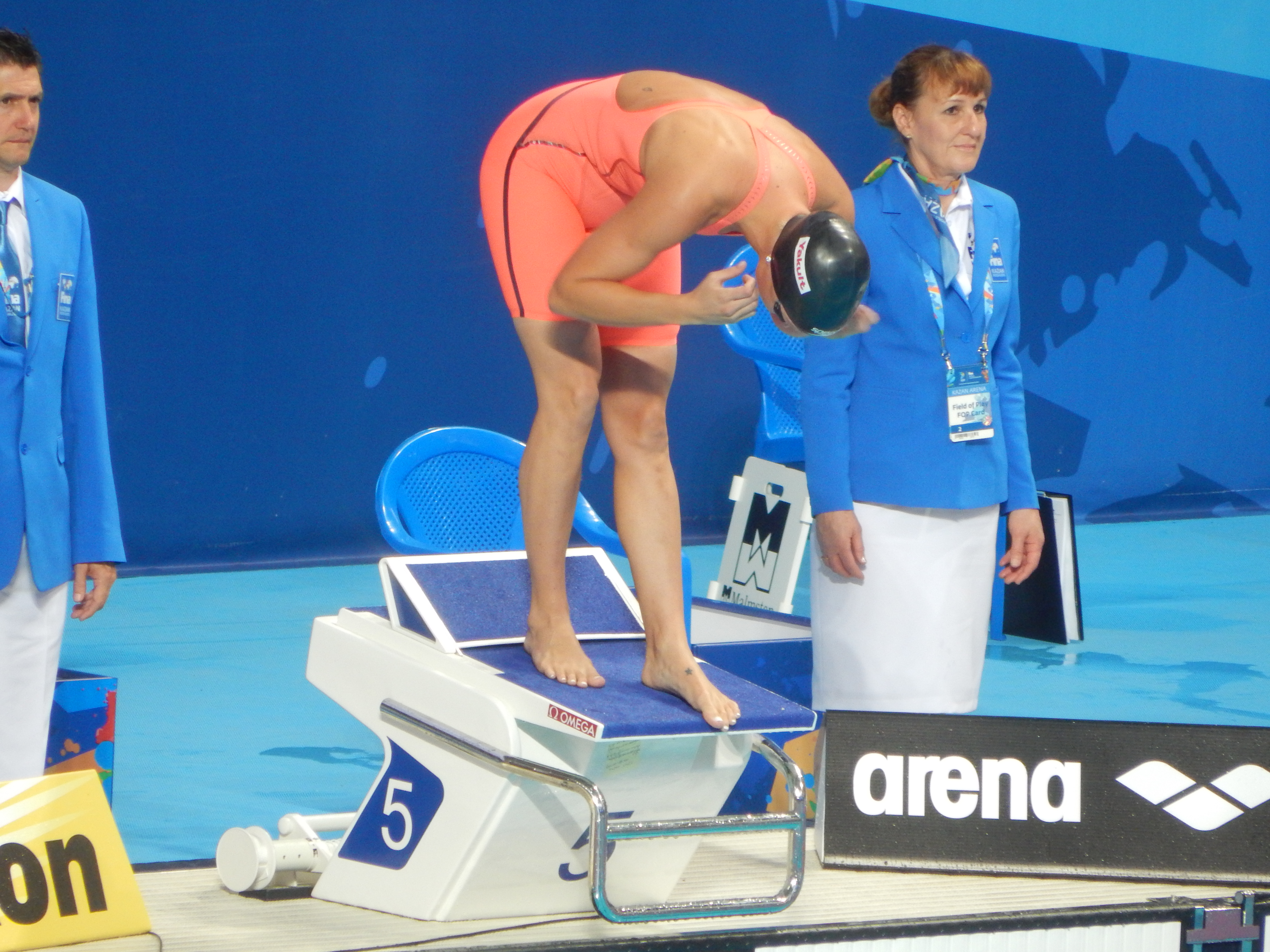
Kazan 2015

At the 2012 United States Olympic Trials in Omaha, Nebraska, Hardy won the 50-meter freestyle with a time of 24.50 seconds, and also won the 100-meter freestyle in 53.96 seconds, thus qualifying to compete in those two events, as well as the 4×100-meter freestyle and the 4×100-meter medley relays, at the 2012 Olympics. She also competed in the 100-meter breaststroke, and placed third in the final behind Olympic newcomer Breeja Larson and veteran Rebecca Soni.

At the 2012 Summer Olympics in London, Hardy won her first Olympic medal, a bronze, in the 4×100-meter freestyle with Missy Franklin, Lia Neal and Allison Schmitt, when the U.S. team finished third behind the teams from Australia and the Netherlands. Swimming the second leg, Hardy had a split of 53.53 seconds and the team finished with a combined time of 3:34.24, an American record.

She earned another gold medal by swimming for the winning U.S. team in preliminary heat two of the 4×100-meter medley relay, although she did not swim in the event final. Her 4x100 medley relay team swam in preliminary Heat 2 and finished fourth with a combined time of 3:58.88 qualifying the American team to advance to the finals, where she did not compete. In her two individual events, she finished seventh in the 50-meter freestyle and eighth in the 100-meter freestyle.

== 2013–2015 ==
Hardy won a gold and two bronze medals at the long course 2013 World Championships in Barcelona, Spain. Her first bronze medal was in the 100 breaststroke, with her best time coming from the heats with a 1:05.18. Her second bronze medal was in the 50 breaststroke, tying her American Record time of 29.80 seconds. The gold medal was in the 4x100-meter medley relay, swimming with Missy Franklin, Dana Vollmer, and Megan Romano.

Hardy won gold in the 100 breaststroke at the 2014 Pan Pacific Championships, as well as a silver in the 4x100-meter medley relay with Missy Franklin, Kendyl Stewart, and Simone Manuel. She was voted team captain of the 2014 Pan Pacific USA team, along with Caitlin Leverenz, Matt Grevers, and Anthony Ervin.

Despite competing with a SLAP shoulder tear, fractured ribs, and a micro-fracture in her left knee, Hardy was able to compete in the final of the 50 breaststroke, finishing fifth. She also placed 4th in the 4x100 medley relay, and 10th in the individual 100 breaststroke. She was again voted team captain of the 2015 World Championships team along with Elizabeth Beisel, Cammile Adams, Matt Grevers, Anthony Ervin, and David Plummer.

At the 2016 Olympic trials, in a preliminary heat of the 100-meter breaststroke, she placed fourth with a time of 1:06.73, qualifying her for the finals. In the finals, however, she did not finish in the top two places required to make the American team. She retired from competitive swimming in 2016.

== Post-swimming pursuits ==
She has a long history of philanthropic work with organizations such as the USA Swimming Foundation, the Jessie Rees Foundation, the Special Olympics, Surf Aid International, the Long Beach Water Department, and volunteering as an athlete representative on the Olympic Internal Operations Committee, the USA Swimming Steering Committee, and the USA Swimming Athletes’ Executive Committee.

Jessica retired from competitive swimming in 2016, after participating in the 2016 Olympic trials. From 2018-2019, she was a student at the School of Professional Studies at Columbia University focusing on Sports Essentials. From 2025-2027, she studied for a Master of Arts in Executive Coaching and Consulting, at Irving California's Concordia University, a degree which provides leadership training and a study of organizational development. Jessica provided "mindset coaching", helping individuals in business and sports achieve their potential through a positive mindset. Since 2016 she has served as a speaker, and swim coach, and as noted, has been active in various philanthropies. In her swim coaching she has offered feedback on swimming technique after clients submitted videos of themselves swimming. She has worked in the field of Sports Marketing, where she served with BSN Sports, a provider of sports equipment and clothing.

In October 2025, she began serving as an Adjunct Professor at the Sports Management Program at California State University Long Beach.

== Personal bests ==
As of June 30, 2018.

Event	Time	Venue	Date	Note(s)
50 m breaststroke (long course)	29.80	Federal Way, Washington	August 7, 2009	
=	29.80	Barcelona, Spain	August 4, 2013	
100 m breaststroke (long course)	1:04.45	Federal Way, Washington	August 7, 2009	
50 m freestyle (long course)	24.48	Omaha	July 5, 2008	
100 m freestyle (long course)	53.86	London	August 1, 2012	
50 m breaststroke (short course)	28.80	Berlin, Germany	November 15, 2009	
100 m breaststroke (short course)	1:03.30	Berlin, Germany	November 14, 2009	
50 m freestyle (short course)	23.96	Stockholm, Sweden	November 10, 2009	
100 m freestyle (short course)	53.46	Atlanta, Georgia	December 16, 2011	

== Bibliography ==
- Hardy, Jessica (June 1, 2015). Swimming Toward the Gold Lining: Swimming Toward the Gold Lining: How Jessica Hardy Turned Her Wounds into Wisdom. Tampa, FL: Soul Writers. ISBN 978-0692557594. OCLC 954170117.

== See also ==
- California Golden Bears
- List of Olympic medalists in swimming (women)
- List of United States records in swimming
- List of University of California, Berkeley alumni
- List of World Aquatics Championships medalists in swimming (women)
- List of world records in swimming
- World record progression 50 metres breaststroke
- World record progression 100 metres breaststroke
- World record progression 4 × 100 metres medley relay

Records
Preceded by Leisel Jones; Rebecca Soni	Women's 100-meter breaststroke world record holder (long course); July 25, 2005 – February 3, 2006; August 7, 2009 – July 29, 2013	Succeeded by Leisel Jones; Rūta Meilutytė
Preceded by Jade Edmistone	Women's 50-meter breaststroke world record holder (short course); April 10, 2008 – October 26, 2016	Succeeded by Alia Atkinson
Preceded by Yuliya Yefimova	Women's 50-meter breaststroke world record holder (long course); August 6, 2009 – August 3, 2013	Succeeded by Rūta Meilutytė
Sporting positions
Preceded by Marieke Guehrer	Female World Cup Overall Winner; 2009	Succeeded by Therese Alshammar
