= 2010 Pan Pacific Swimming Championships – Women's 50 metre breaststroke =

Women's 50 metre breaststroke at the 2010 Pan Pacific Swimming Championships
- Venue: William Woollett Jr. Aquatics Center
- Dates: August 20, 2010 (heats & finals)
- Competitors: 25 from 7 nations
- Winning time: 30.03

Medalists
gold medal	Jessica Hardy	United States
silver medal	Leiston Pickett	Australia
bronze medal	Leisel Jones	Australia

The women's 50 metre breaststroke competition at the 2010 Pan Pacific Swimming Championships took place on August 20 at the William Woollett Jr. Aquatics Center. It was the first appearance of this event in the Pan Pacific Swimming Championships.

== Records ==
Prior to this competition, the existing world record was as follows:

World record	Jessica Hardy (USA)	29.80	Federal Way, United States	August 7, 2009

== Results ==
All times are in minutes and seconds.

KEY:	q	Fastest non-qualifiers	Q	Qualified	CR	Championships record	NR	National record	PB	Personal best	SB	Seasonal best

=== Heats ===
The first round was held on August 20, at 11:42.

Rank	Heat	Lane	Name	Nationality	Time	Notes
1	3	5	Jessica Hardy	United States	30.39	QA
2	3	4	Leisel Jones	Australia	30.61	QA
3	4	5	Leiston Pickett	Australia	30.80	QA
4	3	7	Ann Chandler	United States	30.90	QA
5	2	4	Rebecca Soni	United States	31.02	QA
6	4	4	Sarah Katsoulis	Australia	31.05	QA
7	4	6	Chelsey Salli	Canada	31.27	QA
8	4	3	Samantha Marshall	Australia	31.66	QA
9	2	6	Ashley McGregor	Canada	31.90	QB
9	3	3	Satomi Suzuki	Japan	31.90	QB
11	2	2	Tianna Rissling	Canada	32.00	QB
12	3	6	Mina Matsushima	Japan	32.05	QB
13	1	3	Ariana Kukors	United States	32.07	QB
13	4	2	Micah Lawrence	United States	32.07	QB
15	4	7	Fumie Kawanabe	Japan	32.09	QB
16	2	1	Jillian Tyler	Canada	32.16	QB
17	4	1	Tessa Wallace	Australia	32.22	
18	2	3	Tatiane Sakemi	Brazil	32.23	
19	3	2	Jeong Darae	South Korea	32.59	
20	2	5	Ana Carvalho	Brazil	32.65	
21	4	8	Rie Kaneto	Japan	32.75	
22	3	1	Carolina Mussi	Brazil	33.12	
23	1	4	Sarra Lajnef	Tunisia	33.50	
24	1	5	Juliana Marin	Brazil	33.83	
25	3	8	Natália Favoreto	Brazil	33.91	
-	2	7	Erica Morningstar	Canada	DNS	

=== B Final ===
The B final was held on August 20, at 19:41.

Rank	Lane	Name	Nationality	Time	Notes
9	4	Rebecca Soni	United States	30.68	
10	5	Sarah Katsoulis	Australia	31.33	
11	8	Samantha Marshall	Australia	31.71	
12	6	Fumie Kawanabe	Japan	31.81	
13	3	Tianna Rissling	Canada	31.94	
14	7	Jeong Darae	South Korea	32.40	
15	2	Tatiane Sakemi	Brazil	32.55	
16	1	Ana Carvalho	Brazil	32.96	

=== A Final ===
The A final was held on August 20, at 19:41.

Rank	Lane	Name	Nationality	Time	Notes
1st place, gold medalist(s)	4	Jessica Hardy	United States	30.03	
2nd place, silver medalist(s)	3	Leiston Pickett	Australia	30.75	
3rd place, bronze medalist(s)	5	Leisel Jones	Australia	30.78	
4	6	Ann Chandler	United States	31.20	
5	1	Satomi Suzuki	Japan	31.49	
6	2	Chelsey Salli	Canada	31.55	
7	8	Mina Matsushima	Japan	32.00	
8	7	Ashley McGregor	Canada	32.01	
