= Leiston Pickett =

Australian swimmer

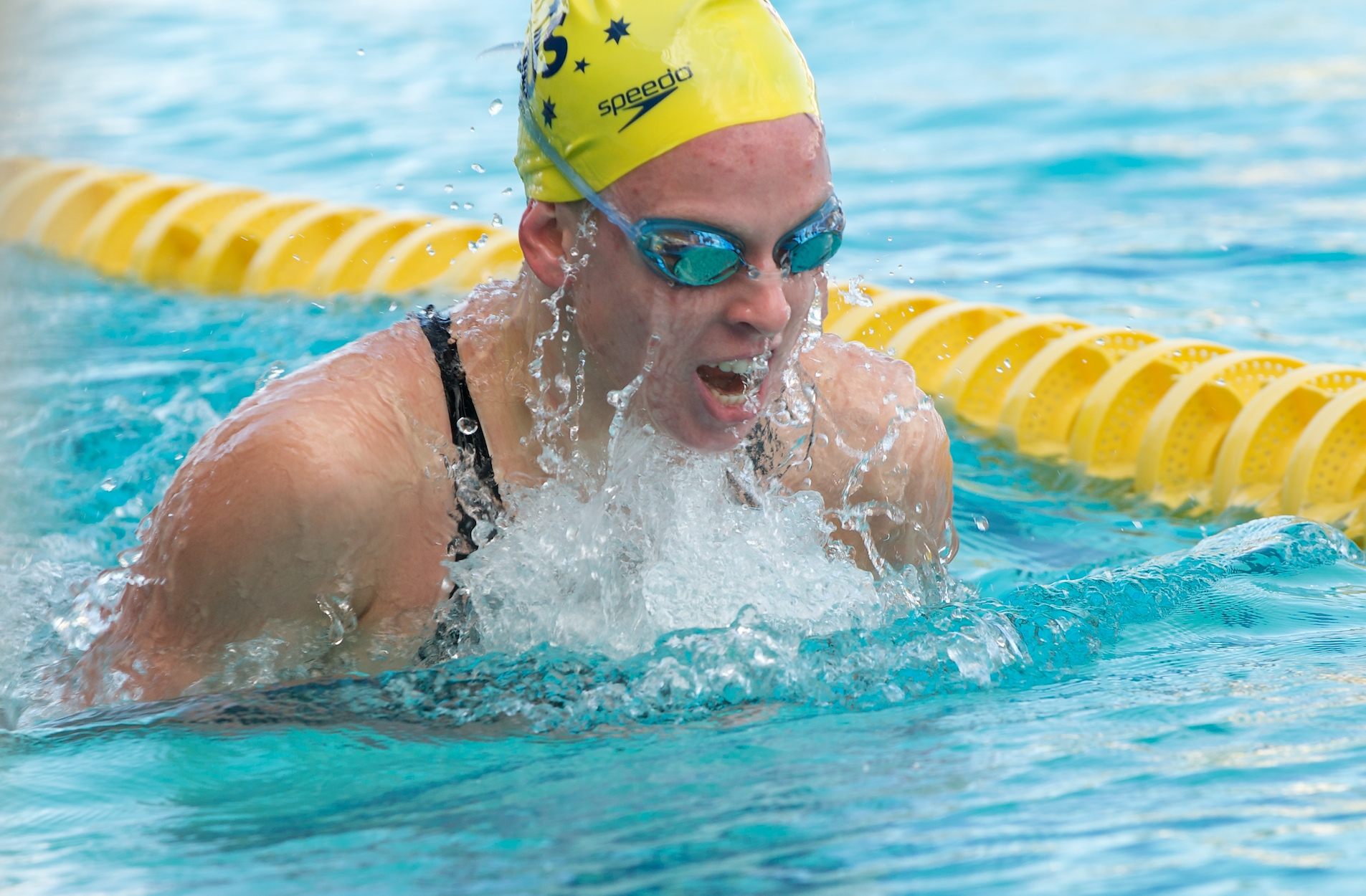

Personal information
- Full name: Leiston Jane Pickett
- Nickname: "Lei"
- National team: Australia
- Born: 8 February 1992 (age 34) Gold Coast, Queensland
- Height: 180 cm (5 ft 11 in)
- Weight: 61 kg (134 lb)

Sport
- Sport: Swimming
- Strokes: Breaststroke
- Club: Southport Olympic
- Coach: Glenn Baker
Medal record
Women's swimming
Representing Australia
World Championships (SC)
Silver medal – second place	2010 Dubai	50 m breaststroke
Pan Pacific Championships
Silver medal – second place	2010 Irvine	50 m breaststroke
Commonwealth Games
Gold medal – first place	2010 Delhi	50 m breaststroke
Gold medal – first place	2014 Glasgow	50 m breaststroke
Bronze medal – third place	2018 Gold Coast	50 m breaststroke

Leiston Jane Pickett (born 8 February 1992) is an Australian Commonwealth Games gold medalist swimmer. A participant in the 2010 Commonwealth Games, Pickett won the 50-metre breaststroke ahead of fellow Australian Leisel Jones.

She attended A.B. Paterson College and graduated in 2009.

In 2010, as well as the Commonwealth gold, she won silver at the short course world championships in the 50 m breaststroke, and in the Pan-Pacific Championships.

She competed at the 2012 Summer Olympics in the 100 m breastroke. She qualified by winning the Australian title in that event, the first time Leisel Jones had not won the title in 12 years. At the Olympics, she did not reach the final, having finished 6th in her heat.

In 2014, she was part of Australian team that won silver in the 4 x 100 m medley relay at the short course world championships. She also retained her Commonwealth 50 m breaststroke gold.

In 2018, on home soil, she won bronze in the 50 m breaststroke at the 2018 Commonwealth Games.
