= Swimming at the 2003 Pan American Games – Women's 4 × 100 metre medley relay =

The Women's 4x100m Medley Relay event at the 2003 Pan American Games took place on August 16, 2003 (Day 15 of the Games).

== Medalists ==
| Gold | Diana MacManus; Staciana Stitts; Dana Vollmer; Amanda Weir; United States |
| Silver | Joanne Malar-Morreale; Kathleen Stoody; Audrey Lacroix; Elizabeth Collins; Canada |
| Bronze | Danielle de Alba; Adriana Marmolejo; Atenas López; Alejandra Galan; Mexico |

== Records ==
| World Record | United States | 3:58.30 | 2000-09-23 | Sydney, Australia |
| Pan Am Record | United States | 4:06.08 | 1999-08-06 | Winnipeg, Canada |

== Results ==
| Place | Nation | Swimmers | Heats | | Final |
| Place | Nation | Swimmers | Time | Rank | Time |
|---|---|---|---|---|---|
| 1 | United States | ♦ Diana MacManus ♦ Staciana Stitts ♦ Dana Vollmer ♦ Amanda Weir | 4:09.80 | 1 | 4:05.92 GR |
| 2 | Canada | ♦ Joanne Malar-Morreale ♦ Kathleen Stoody ♦ Audrey Lacroix ♦ Elizabeth Collins | 4:18.36 | 2 | 4:13.72 |
| 3 | Mexico | ♦ Danielle de Alba ♦ Adriana Marmolejo ♦ Atenas López ♦ Alejandra Galan | 4:32.19 | 5 | 4:18.04 |
| 4 | Brazil | ♦ Paula Baracho ♦ Patrícia Comini ♦ Ivi Monteiro ♦ Flávia Delaroli | 4:25.30 | 3 | 4:18.29 |
| 5 | Peru | ♦ ♦ ♦ ♦ | 4:33.30 | 6 | 4:29.74 |
| 6 | Trinidad and Tobago | ♦ ♦ ♦ ♦ | 4:34.24 | 7 | 4:31.47 |
| 7 | Dominican Republic | ♦ ♦ ♦ ♦ | 4:39.92 | 8 | 4:40.05 |
| 8 | Jamaica | ♦ ♦ ♦ ♦ | 4:30.39 | 4 | DQ |
| — | Puerto Rico | ♦ ♦ ♦ ♦ | DQ | — | |
