= Swimming at the 2012 Summer Olympics – Women's 4 × 100 metre freestyle relay =

Women's 4 × 100 metre freestyle relay at the Games of the XXX Olympiad
- Venue: London Aquatics Centre
- Dates: 28 July 2012
- Competitors: 84 from 16 nations
- Teams: 16
- Winning time: 3:33.15 OR

Medalists
1st place, gold medalist(s)		Alicia Coutts, Cate Campbell, Brittany Elmslie, Melanie Schlanger, Emily Seebohm*, Yolane Kukla*, Lisbeth Trickett*	Australia
2nd place, silver medalist(s)		Inge Dekker, Marleen Veldhuis, Femke Heemskerk, Ranomi Kromowidjojo, Hinkelien Schreuder*	Netherlands
3rd place, bronze medalist(s)		Missy Franklin, Jessica Hardy, Lia Neal, Allison Schmitt, Amanda Weir*, Natalie Coughlin*; *Indicates the swimmer only competed in the preliminary heats.	United States

The women's 4 × 100 metre freestyle relay event at the 2012 Summer Olympics took place on 28 July at the London Aquatics Centre in London, United Kingdom.

The Australian women's team fought off an early lead by their American rivals and overhauled the field down the stretch to recapture the Olympic freestyle relay title they last held in 2004. The foursome of Alicia Coutts (53.90), Cate Campbell (53.19), Brittany Elmslie (53.41), and Melanie Schlanger (52.65) put together a blazing fast finish with a new Olympic record in 3:33.15.

The Netherlands nearly pulled a worst-to-first effort, building from an eighth-place turn by Inge Dekker (54.67), fifth by Marleen Veldhuis (53.80), and third by Femke Heemskerk (53.39), until they handed Ranomi Kromowidjojo the anchor duties on the final exchange. She delivered a fastest freestyle split in the field with an anchor of 51.93 to race against the Americans for the silver in 3:33.79, but finished just 0.64 seconds off the pace posted by the Australians. Meanwhile, the U.S. team got off an early lead from Missy Franklin (53.52) and Jessica Hardy (53.53), but slipped through the final stretches from Lia Neal (53.65) and Allison Schmitt (53.54) to settle for the bronze in an American record of 3:34.24. Building a new milestone, Neal became the first ever African-American female to swim in an Olympic final, while Natalie Coughlin, who competed earlier in the relay prelims, picked up her twelfth career medal to share a three-way tie with Dara Torres and Jenny Thompson as the most decorated female Olympic swimmers of all time.

China (3:36.75), Great Britain (3:37.02), Denmark (3:37.45), and Japan (3:37.96) also vied for an Olympic medal to round out the championship finale, while Sweden was disqualified from the race because of an early relay takeoff by anchor Gabriella Fagundez.

== Records ==
Prior to this competition, the existing world and Olympic records were as follows.

World record	Netherlands (NED); Inge Dekker (53.61); Ranomi Kromowidjojo (52.30); Femke Heemskerk (53.03); Marleen Veldhuis (52.78)	3:31.72	Rome, Italy	26 July 2009
Olympic record	Netherlands; Inge Dekker (54.37); Ranomi Kromowidjojo (53.39); Femke Heemskerk (53.42); Marleen Veldhuis (52.58)	3:33.76	Beijing, China	10 August 2008

The following records were established during the competition:

Date	Event	Name	Nation	Time	Record
July 28	Final	Alicia Coutts (53.90); Cate Campbell (53.19); Brittany Elmslie (53.41); Melanie Schlanger (52.65)	Australia	3:33.15	OR

== Results ==
=== Heats ===
Rank	Heat	Lane	Nation	Swimmers	Time	Notes
1	2	3	Australia	Emily Seebohm (54.24); Brittany Elmslie (53.41); Yolane Kukla (54.61); Lisbeth Trickett (54.08)	3:36.34	Q
2	1	4	United States	Lia Neal (54.15); Amanda Weir (54.37); Natalie Coughlin (53.93); Allison Schmitt (54.08)	3:36.53	Q
3	2	4	Netherlands	Marleen Veldhuis (54.73); Inge Dekker (53.79); Hinkelien Schreuder (55.62); Femke Heemskerk (53.62)	3:37.76	Q
4	1	6	China	Tang Yi (53.86); Qiu Yuhan (54.85); Wang Haibing (54.14); Wang Shijia (55.06)	3:37.91	Q
5	1	5	Japan	Haruka Ueda (54.22); Yayoi Matsumoto (54.23); Miki Uchida (54.47); Hanae Ito (55.14)	3:38.06	Q, NR
6	2	2	Denmark	Pernille Blume (54.44); Mie Nielsen (54.49); Lotte Friis (55.97); Jeanette Ottesen Gray (53.19)	3:38.09	Q, NR
7	1	2	Great Britain	Amy Smith (54.29); Jess Lloyd (54.53); Caitlin McClatchey (54.64); Rebecca Turner (54.75)	3:38.21	Q
7	1	3	Sweden	Sarah Sjöström (54.31); Michelle Coleman (54.14); Ida Marko-Varga (54.57); Gabriella Fagundez (55.19)	3:38.21	Q
9	2	5	Germany	Britta Steffen (54.43); Silke Lippok (55.30); Lisa Vitting (54.77); Daniela Schreiber (54.66)	3:39.16	
10	1	7	Russia	Veronika Popova (54.30); Nataliya Lovtsova (55.00); Viktoriya Andreyeva (55.27); Margarita Nesterova (55.02)	3:39.59	
11	2	6	Canada	Victoria Poon (54.67); Julia Wilkinson (54.38); Samantha Cheverton (54.93); Heather MacLean (55.62)	3:39.60	
12	2	7	Italy	Alice Mizzau (55.17); Federica Pellegrini (54.28); Laura Letrari (55.74); Erika Ferraioli (54.55)	3:39.74	NR
13	1	8	Belarus	Aliaksandra Herasimenia (53.85); Sviatlana Khakhlova (54.96); Aksana Dziamidava (55.94); Yuliya Khitraya (55.92)	3:40.67	NR
14	2	1	New Zealand	Natasha Hind (55.93); Penelope Marshall (55.82); Amaka Gessler (55.77); Hayley Palmer (55.03)	3:42.55	
15	1	1	Hungary	Ágnes Mutina (56.05); Evelyn Verrasztó (55.80); Éva Risztov (57.81); Eszter Dara (55.13)	3:44.79	
16	2	8	Greece	Theodora Drakou (55.42); Nery Mantey Niangkouara (55.52); Theodora Giareni (57.26); Kristel Vourna (57.35)	3:45.55	

=== Final ===
Rank	Lane	Nation	Swimmers	Time	Time Behind	Notes
1st place, gold medalist(s)	4	Australia	Alicia Coutts (53.90); Cate Campbell (53.19); Brittany Elmslie (53.41); Melanie Schlanger (52.65)	3:33.15		OR
2nd place, silver medalist(s)	3	Netherlands	Inge Dekker (54.67); Marleen Veldhuis (53.80); Femke Heemskerk (53.39); Ranomi Kromowidjojo (51.93)	3:33.79	0.64	
3rd place, bronze medalist(s)	5	United States	Missy Franklin (53.52); Jessica Hardy (53.53); Lia Neal (53.65); Allison Schmitt (53.54)	3:34.24	1.09	AM
4	6	China	Tang Yi (53.58); Qiu Yuhan (54.49); Wang Haibing (54.03); Pang Jiaying (54.65)	3:36.75	3.60	
5	8	Great Britain	Amy Smith (54.27); Francesca Halsall (53.29); Jess Lloyd (54.65); Caitlin McClatchey (54.81)	3:37.02	3.87	
6	7	Denmark	Pernille Blume (54.52); Mie Nielsen (54.04); Lotte Friis (55.65); Jeanette Ottesen Gray (53.24)	3:37.45	4.30	NR
7	2	Japan	Haruka Ueda (54.34); Yayoi Matsumoto (54.52); Miki Uchida (54.43); Hanae Ito (54.67)	3:37.96	4.81	NR
	1	Sweden	Michelle Coleman (54.57); Sarah Sjöström (53.91); Ida Marko-Varga (55.01); Gabriella Fagundez	DSQ		
