= Yolane Kukla =

Australian swimmer

Yolane Kukla OAM
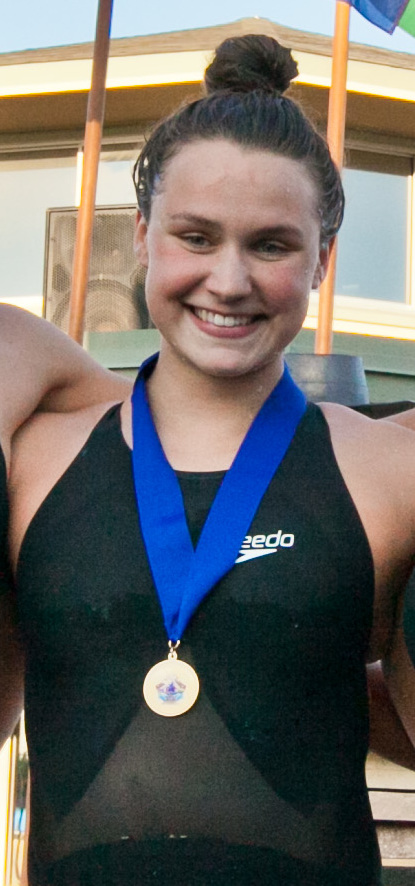

Personal information
- Full name: Yolane Nicole Kukla
- Nickname: "Yo"
- National team: Australia
- Born: 29 September 1995 (age 30) Brisbane, Queensland
- Height: 1.68 m (5 ft 6 in)
- Weight: 61 kg (134 lb)

Sport
- Sport: Swimming
- Strokes: Butterfly, freestyle
- Club: St Peters Western SC
Medal record
Women's swimming
Representing Australia
Olympic Games
Gold medal – first place	2012 London	4×100 m freestyle
Pan Pacific Championships
Silver medal – second place	2010 Irvine	4×100 m freestyle
Silver medal – second place	2010 Irvine	4×100 m medley
Commonwealth Games
Gold medal – first place	2010 Delhi	50 m freestyle

Yolane Nicole Kukla (born 29 September 1995) is an Australian butterfly and freestyle swimmer.

== Career ==
At the 2010 Telstra Australian Swimming Championships in Sydney at just 14, Kukla earned selection for the Commonwealth Games team for Delhi, where she won the gold medal in the 50-metre freestyle, and Australian team for the Pan Pacific Championships. She made her senior Australian team debut at the 2010 Pan Pacific Swimming Championships where she collected two relay silver medals and finished 4th in the 50- and 100-metre freestyle and the 100-metre butterfly, along with winning the B final in the 50-metre butterfly equaling the existing championship record. At the 2010 Commonwealth Games she was dropped from the relays, and finished 4th in the 50- and 100-metre butterfly, she won the gold medal in the 50-metre freestyle in a time of 24.86 seconds.

Kukla swam in the heats of the 4×100-metre freestyle relay at the 2012 London Olympics helping qualify the team for the final where the team won the gold medal. The team included Libby Trickett, Emily Seebohm, Alicia Coutts, Cate Campbell, Melanie Schlanger and Brittany Elmslie.

== See also ==
- List of Olympic medalists in swimming (women)
