= Swimming at the 2005 World Aquatics Championships – Women's 100 metre breaststroke =

Women's 100 metre breaststroke at the 2005 FINA World Aquatics Championships
- Dates: 25 July (prelims, semifinals); 26 July (final)
- Competitors: 53 from 40 nations
- Winning time: 1 minutes 6.25 seconds

Medalists
gold medal	Leisel Jones	Australia
silver medal	Jessica Hardy	United States
bronze medal	Tara Kirk	United States

The Women's 100 Breaststroke event at the 11th FINA World Aquatics Championships swam 25+26 July 2005 in Montreal, Canada. Preliminary and semifinal heats were swum on 25 July, with the prelims in the morning session and the semis in the evening. The final went the next evening.

At the start of the event, the existing world (WR) and championship (CR) records were:

- WR: 1:06.37, Leisel Jones (Australia) swum 21 July 2003 in Barcelona, Spain
- CR: 1:06.37, Leisel Jones (Australia) swum 21 July 2003 in Barcelona, Spain

== Results ==
=== Prelims ===
Rank	Heat + lane	Swimmer	Nation	Time	Notes
1	H6 L4	Leisel Jones	Australia	1:07.26	q
2	H6 L5	Jessica Hardy	United States	1:07.34	q
3	H5 L4	Tara Kirk	United States	1:07.80	q
4	H7 L6	Sarah Poewe	Germany	1:08.64	q
5	H6 L3	Beata Kaminska	Poland	1:08.69	q
6	H7 L7	Suzaan van Biljon	South Africa	1:08.70	q
7	H5 L5	Kate Haywood	Great Britain	1:08.76	q
7	H6 L6	Chiara Boggiatto	Italy	1:08.76	q
9	H7 L2	Ekaterina Kormatcheva	Russia	1:08.81	q
10	H6 L2	Katarzyna Dulian	Poland	1:08.89	q
11	H7 L5	Brooke Hanson	Australia	1:09.34	q
12	H5 L2	Mirna Jukić	Austria	1:09.80	q
12	H5 L8	Eeva Saarinen	Finland	1:09.80	q
14	H7 L4	LUO Xuejuan	China	1:09.83	q
15	H5 L6	Elena Bogomazova	Russia	1:09.84	q
16	H5 L3	Sayaka Nakmura	Japan	1:09.93	q
17	H5 L7	Christin Petelski	Canada	1:09.94	
18	H6 L1	Nanka Tamura	Japan	1:09.96	
19	H4 L5	Josefin Wede	Sweden	1:10.12	
20	H5 L1	Madelon Baans	Netherlands	1:10.13	
21	H7 L3	Kirsty Balfour	Great Britain	1:10.32	
22	H7 L1	Diana Gomes	Portugal	1:10.56	
23	H4 L7	Seul-Ki Jung	South Korea	1:10.71	
24	H4 L2	Su Yeon Back	South Korea	1:10.72	
25	H4 L4	Kathleen Stoody	Canada	1:11.01	
26	H4 L8	Annabelle Carey	New Zealand	1:11.05	
27	H6 L7	Angeliki Exarchou	Greece	1:11.56	
28	H4 L3	Marina Kuč	Serbia and Montenegro	1:11.78	
29	H4 L1	Rebecca Ejdervik	Sweden	1:11.85	
30	H6 L8	Chenfei Ma	China	1:11.87	
31	4H L6	Kelly Bentley	New Zealand	1:12.28	
32	H7 L8	Ina Kapishina	Belarus	1:12.35	
33	H3 L4	Yi Ting Siow	Malaysia	1:12.44	
34	H3 L3	Joscelin Yeo	Singapore	1:12.74	
35	H2 L5	Louise Jansen	Denmark	1:12.80	
36	H3 L7	Alia Atkinson	Jamaica	1:13.21	
37	H3 L5	Tamara Sambrailo	Slovenia	1:13.49	
38	H3 L8	Nicolette Teo	Singapore	1:13.65	
39	H3 L2	Yu-Chia Tong	Chinese Taipei	1:14.08	
40	H2 L4	Valeria Silva	Peru	1:15.38	
41	H2 L6	Dannielle Van Zijl	Namibia	1:15.93	
42	H3 L1	Ting-Wei Lin	Chinese Taipei	1:15.98	
43	H2 L1	Alexis Jordan	Barbados	1:18.09	
44	H2 L2	Sin Ian Lei	Macau	1:19.58	
45	H2 L8	Mayumi Raheem	Sri Lanka	1:21.06	
46	H2 L7	Nataliya Filina	Azerbaijan	1:21.19	
47	H1 L6	Katerine Moreno	Bolivia	1:21.43	
48	H1 L4	Samantha Fajardo	Ecuador	1:22.59	
49	H1 L3	Blessing Forcados	Nigeria	1:23.57	
50	H1 L5	Melissa Ashby	Grenada	1:24.09	
51	H2 L3	Phan Thi Hanh	Vietnam	1:24.64	
52	H1 L2	Sameera Al Bitar	Bahrain	1:29.45	
--	--	Smiljana Marinović	Croatia	DNS	

=== Semifinals ===
Rank	Heat + lane	Swimmer	Nation	Time	Notes
1	S1 L4	Jessica Hardy	USA	1:06.20	q, WR
2	S2 L4	Leisel Jones	Australia	1:06.93	q
3	S2 L5	Tara Kirk	USA	1:07.20	q
4	S1 L5	Sarah Poewe	Germany	1:07.80	q
5	S1 L1	LUO Xuejuan	China	1:08.01	q
6	S2 L7	Brooke Hanson	Australia	1:08.33	q
7	S1 L6	Chiara Boggiatto	Italy	1:08.48	q
8	S1 L3	Suzaan van Biljon	South Africa	1:08.50	q
9	S2 L3	Beata Kaminska	Poland	1:08.54	
10	S2 L6	Kate Haywood	Great Britain	1:08.65	
11	S1 L7	Mirna Jukić	Austria	1:08.90	
12	S1 L2	Katarzyna Dulian	Poland	1:08.99	
13	S2 L2	Ekaterina Kormatcheva	Russia	1:09.17	
14	S2 L1	Eeva Saarinen	Finland	1:09.83	
15	S1 L8	Sayaka Nakamura	Japan	1:10.04	
--	S2 L8	Elena Bogomazova	Russia	DQ	

=== Final ===
Place	Swimmer	Nation	Time	Notes
1	Leisel Jones	Australia	1:06.25	
2	Jessica Hardy	USA	1:06.62	
3	Tara Kirk	USA	1:07.43	
4	LUO Xuejuan	China	1:07.60	
5	Brooke Hanson	Australia	1:08.07	
6	Suzaan van Biljon	South Africa	1:08.38	
7	Sarah Poewe	Germany	1:08.47	
8	Chiara Boggiatto	Italy	1:08.98	
