= Swimming at the 2005 World Aquatics Championships – Women's 50 metre breaststroke =

Women's 50m Breaststroke at the 2005 FINA World Aquatics Championships
- Dates: 30 July (prelims, semifinals); 31 July (final)
- Competitors: 52 from 41 nations
- Winning time: 30.45 seconds

Medalists
gold medal	Jade Edmistone	Australia
silver medal	Jessica Hardy	United States
bronze medal	Brooke Hanson	Australia

The Women's 50 Breaststroke event at the 11th FINA World Aquatics Championships swam 30 – 31 July 2005 in Montreal, Quebec, Canada. Preliminary and Semifinal heats were swum on 30 July with the heats being held in the morning session and the semifinals being held in the evening session. The final was held on 31 July.

At the start of the event, the existing World (WR) and Championships (CR) records were:

- WR: 30.57, Zoë Baker (Great Britain) swum 30 July 2002 in Manchester, UK
- CR: 30.64, LUO Xuejuan (China) swum 26 July 2003 in Barcelona, Spain

== Results ==
=== Preliminary heats ===
Rank	Heat + Lane	Swimmer	Nation	Time	Notes
1	H7 L4	Jade Edmistone	Australia	30.79	q
2	H6 L4	Brooke Hanson	Australia	30.99	q
3	H6 L3	Jessica Hardy	United States	31.13	q
4	H7 L5	Zoë Baker	New Zealand	31.30	q
5	H6 L5	Kate Haywood	Great Britain	31.66	q
6	H5 L5	Tara Kirk	United States	31.71	q
7	H7 L3	Janne Schaefer	Germany	32.00	q
8	H5 L4	LUO Xuejuan	China	32.08	q
9	H7 L6	Ekaterina Kormatcheva	Russia	32.14	q
10	H5 L3	Beata Kaminska	Poland	32.15	q
11	H6 L8	Suzaan van Biljon	South Africa	32.19	q
12	H7 L7	Eeva Saarinen	Finland	32.28	q
13	H5 L6	Elena Bogomazova	Russia	32.35	q
14	H7 L2	Rebecca Ejdervik	Sweden	32.43	q
15	H6 L6	Moniek Nijhuis	Netherlands	32.62	q
16	H5 L2	Mirna Jukić	Austria	32.71	q
17	H5 L7	Ina Kapishina	Belarus	32.79	
18	H4 L4	Diana Gomes	Portugal	33.00	
18	H6 L2	Sayaka Nakamura	Japan	33.00	
20	H4 L8	Su Yeon Back	South Korea	33.01	
20	H5 L8	Petra Chocová	Czech Republic	33.01	
22	H6 L1	Katarzyna Dulian	Poland	33.03	
23	H5 L1	Annabelle Carey	New Zealand	33.04	
24	H4 L3	Alia Atkinson	Jamaica	33.26	
25	H7 L8	Chenfei Ma	China	33.29	
26	H4 L7	Seul-Ki Jung	South Korea	33.38	
27	H7 L1	Angeliki Exarchou	Greece	33.59	
28	H3 L4	Kathleen Stoody	Canada	33.74	
29	H3 L5	Marina Kuč	Serbia and Montenegro	33.76	
29	H4 L6	Yu-Chia Tong	Chinese Taipei	33.76	
31	H4 L1	Louise Jansen	Denmark	33.86	
32	H3 L3	Megumi Taneda	Japan	33.97	
33	H4 L2	Tamara Sambrailo	Slovenia	33.98	
34	H3 L6	Valeria Silva	Peru	34.14	
35	H3 L2	Nicolette Teo	Singapore	34.42	
36	H3 L7	Ting-Wei Lin	Chinese Taipei	34.56	
37	H3 L1	Dannielle Van Zijl	Namibia	35.36	
38	H3 L8	Qiyu Sandy Mo	Singapore	35.75	
39	H2 L5	Alexis Jordan	Barbados	35.87	
40	H2 L2	Samantha Fajardo	Ecuador	36.15	
41	H2 L7	Ellen Hight	Zambia	37.03	
42	H2 L6	Mayumi Raheem	Sri Lanka	37.04	
43	H2 L3	Sin Ian Lei	Macau	37.14	
44	H2 L1	Katerine Moreno	Bolivia	38.15	
45	H2 L4	Blessing Forcados	Nigeria	38.75	
46	H1 L6	Sana Wahid	Pakistan	40.18	
47	H2 L8	Natasaha Ratter	Uganda	41.69	
48	H1 L3	Pamela Girimbabazi Rugabira	Rwanda	46.38	
--	--	Ayele Sika Ornella Pamela Dossavi	Togo	DNS	
--	--	Eliane Droubry Dohi	Ivory Coast	DNS	
--	--	Christin Petelski	Canada	DNS	
--	--	Rebeca Gusmão	Brazil	DNS	

=== Semifinals ===
Rank	Heat + Lane	Swimmer	Nation	Time	Notes
1	S2 L4	Jade Edmistone	Australia	30.61	q, CR
2	S2 L5	Jessica Hardy	(United States) USA	31.10	q
3	S1 L4	Brooke Hanson	Australia	31.15	q
4	S1 L3	Tara Kirk	(United States) USA	31.26	q
5	S2 L3	Kate Haywood	(United Kingdom) Great Britain	31.41	q
6	S1 L6	LUO Xuejuan	China	31.45	q
7	S1 L5	Zoë Baker	New Zealand	31.58	q
8	S2 L6	Janne Schaefer	Germany	31.76	q
9	S2 L2	Ekaterina Kormatcheva	Russia	31.99	
10	S1 L2	Beata Kaminska	Poland	32.12	
11	S2 L1	Elena Bogomazova	Russia	32.35	
12	S1 L1	Rebecca Ejdervik	Sweden	32.36	
13	S2 L8	Moniek Nijhuis	Netherlands	32.61	
14	S1 L8	Mirna Jukić	Austria	32.67	
14	S2 L7	Suzaan van Biljon	South Africa	32.67	
16	S1 L7	Eeva Saarinen	Finland	32.73	

=== Final ===
Place	Swimmer	National	Time	Notes
1st place, gold medalist(s)	Jade Edmistone	Australia	30.45	WR
2nd place, silver medalist(s)	Jessica Hardy	(United States) USA	30.85	
3rd place, bronze medalist(s)	Brooke Hanson	Australia	30.89	
4	Tara Kirk	(United States) USA	31.38	
5	Zoë Baker	New Zealand	31.43	
6	Kate Haywood	(United Kingdom) Great Britain	31.49	
7	LUO Xuejuan	China	31.50	
8	Janne Schaefer	Germany	32.45	
