= Swimming at the 2003 Pan American Games – Women's 200 metre breaststroke =

The Women's 200m Breaststroke event at the 2003 Pan American Games took place on August 13, 2003 (Day 12 of the Games).

== Medalists ==
Gold	Alexi Spann; United States
Silver	Lisa Blackburn; Canada
Bronze	Kathleen Stoody; Canada

== Records ==
World Record	Qi Hui (CHN); Amanda Beard (USA)	2:22.99	2001-04-13; 2003-07-25	Hangzhou, PR China; Barcelona, Spain
Pan Am Record	Dorsey Tierney (USA)	2:28.69	1991-08-13	Havana, Cuba

== Results ==
Place	Swimmer	Heats		Final
Place	Swimmer	Time	Rank	Time
1	Alexi Spann (USA)	2:30.94	1	2:29.76
2	Lisa Blackburn (CAN)	2:33.60	3	2:31.52
3	Kathleen Stoody (CAN)	2:34.19	4	2:31.93
4	Melissa Klein (USA)	2:33.07	2	2:33.63
5	Agustina de Giovanni (ARG)	2:35.72	5	2:33.92
6	Imaday Núñez (CUB)	2:36.80	7	2:34.10
7	Adriana Marmolejo (MEX)	2:36.55	6	2:34.20
8	Joanna Maranhão (BRA)	2:40.36	8	2:38.12
9	Shannon Duval (TRI)	2:43.83	10	2:41.56
10	Patrícia Comini (BRA)	2:42.25	9	2:41.75
11	Margoth Escalante (ESA)	2:47.09	12	2:44.87
12	Alia Atkinson (JAM)	2:48.70	14	2:45.49
13	Katerine Moreno (BOL)	2:48.15	13	2:45.68
14	Maria Zenoni (DOM)	2:46.95	11	2:46.48
15	Jamie Shufflebarger (ISV)	2:53.39	15	2:51.53
