= 2006 Pan Pacific Swimming Championships – Women's 4 × 100 metre medley relay =

Women's 4 × 100 metre medley relay at the 2006 Pan Pacific Swimming Championships
- Venue: Saanich Commonwealth Place
- Dates: August 20, 2006 (heats & finals)
- Winning time: 3:58.38

Medalists
| gold medal | Natalie Coughlin, Jessica Hardy, Rachel Komisarz and Amanda Weir | United States |
| silver medal | Hanae Ito, Asami Kitagawa, Yuko Nakanishi and Maki Mita | Japan |
| bronze medal | Fran Adcock, Sarah Katsoulis, Jessicah Schipper and Melanie Schlanger | Australia |

The women's 4 × 100 metre medley relay competition at the 2006 Pan Pacific Swimming Championships took place on August 20 at the Saanich Commonwealth Place. The last champion was Australia.

== Records ==
Prior to this competition, the existing world and Pan Pacific records were as follows:

| World record | Australia (AUS); Sophie Edington (1:01.06); Leisel Jones (1:05.51); Jessicah Schipper (56.86); Libby Lenton (52.87) | 3:56.30 | Melbourne, Australia | March 21, 2006 |
| Pan Pacific Championships record | Australia (AUS); Dyana Calub (1:01.98); Leisel Jones (1:07.51); Petria Thomas (56.94); Jodie Henry (54.07) | 4:00.50 | Yokohama, Japan | August 29, 2002 |

== Results ==
All times are in minutes and seconds.

| KEY: | q | Fastest non-qualifiers | Q | Qualified | CR | Championships record | NR | National record | PB | Personal best | SB | Seasonal best |

=== Heats ===
Heats weren't performed, as only seven teams had entered.

=== Final ===
The final was held on August 20, at 20:27.

| Rank | Lane | Name | Nationality | Time | Notes |
|---|---|---|---|---|---|
| 1st place, gold medalist(s) | 5 | Natalie Coughlin (1:00.12); Jessica Hardy (1:06.53); Rachel Komisarz (57.88); Amanda Weir (53.85) | United States | 3:58.38 | CR |
| 2nd place, silver medalist(s) | 2 | Hanae Ito (1:00.63); Asami Kitagawa (1:08.54); Yuko Nakanishi (58.21); Maki Mita (55.09) | Japan | 4:02.47 | |
| 3rd place, bronze medalist(s) | 4 | Fran Adcock (1:02.85); Sarah Katsoulis (1:08.53); Jessicah Schipper (57.76); Melanie Schlanger (54.68) | Australia | 4:03.82 | |
| 4 | 3 | Kelly Stefanyshyn (1:02.48); Jillian Tyler (1:09.21); MacKenzie Downing (58.91); Erica Morningstar (54.99) | Canada | 4:05.59 | |
| 5 | 6 | Hannah McLean (1:01.93); Annabelle Carey (1:11.47); Liz Coster (1:00.25); Alison Fitch (55.63) | New Zealand | 4:09.28 | |
| 6 | 7 | Lee Nam-Eun (1:02.98); Jung Seul-Ki (1:10.63); Shin Hae-In (59.42); Lee Keo-Ra (56.29) | South Korea | 4:09.32 | |
| 7 | 1 | Tsai Hiu Wai (1:02.99); Suen Ka Yi (1:14.09); Sze Hang Yu (1:02.42); Hannah Wilson (56.80) | Hong Kong | 4:16.30 | |
