= Melanie Schlanger =

Australian swimmer (born 1986)

Melanie Wright (Melanie Schlanger)
Personal information
- Full name: Melanie Renée Wright
- Nicknames: "Mel", "Schlangs"
- National team: Australia
- Born: 31 August 1986 (age 40) Nambour, Queensland
- Height: 1.76 m (5 ft 9 in)
- Weight: 65 kg (143 lb)
- Website: MelanieSchlanger.com.au

Sport
- Sport: Swimming
- Strokes: Freestyle
- Club: Maroochydore SC, Commercial SC, Southport SC
- Coach: Brian Stehr, Chris Mooney, Stephan Widmer, Glenn Baker
Medal record
Women's swimming
Representing Australia
| Event | 1st | 2nd | 3rd |
|---|---|---|---|
| Olympic Games | 2 | 2 | 1 |
| World Championships (LC) | 2 | 0 | 1 |
| Pan Pacific Championships | 1 | 1 | 3 |
| Commonwealth Games | 1 | 0 | 0 |
| Total | 6 | 3 | 5 |
Olympic Games
| Gold medal – first place | 2008 Beijing | 4×200 m freestyle |
| Gold medal – first place | 2012 London | 4×100 m freestyle |
| Silver medal – second place | 2012 London | 4×200 m freestyle |
| Silver medal – second place | 2012 London | 4×100 m medley |
| Bronze medal – third place | 2008 Beijing | 4×100 m freestyle |
World Championships (LC)
| Gold medal – first place | 2007 Melbourne | 4×100 m freestyle |
| Gold medal – first place | 2015 Kazan | 4×100 m freestyle |
| Bronze medal – third place | 2015 Kazan | 4×100 m medley |
Pan Pacific Championships
| Gold medal – first place | 2014 Gold Coast | 4×100 m freestyle |
| Silver medal – second place | 2014 Gold Coast | 4×200 m freestyle |
| Bronze medal – third place | 2006 Victoria | 100 m freestyle |
| Bronze medal – third place | 2006 Victoria | 4×100 m freestyle |
| Bronze medal – third place | 2006 Victoria | 4×100 m medley |
Commonwealth Games
| Gold medal – first place | 2014 Glasgow | 4×100 m freestyle |

Melanie Renée Schlanger, OAM (born 31 August 1986), also known by her married name Melanie Wright, is an Australian freestyle swimmer. Melanie first represented Australia at the 2006 Pan Pacific Swimming Championships and her career spanned ten years, ending after the 2015 World Championships. She represented Australia at the 2008 Beijing and 2012 London Olympics winning five Olympic medals (including 2 gold).

== Early life ==
Melanie was born and raised on the Sunshine Coast in Queensland. A participant in a large range of sports, Melanie only began swimming at the age of 14. She completed her secondary school studies at Immanuel Lutheran College.

She is the youngest of two siblings, Nikki and Adam, and daughter to Paul and Linda.

== Sporting career ==
Melanie had her first taste of success as a member of the Australian 4×100-metre freestyle relay team that won gold at the 2007 World Championships. The same year, Melanie also broke a world record with Australia's short course 4 x 100 freestyle relay.

Swimming at the 2008 Summer Olympics, she swam the third leg in both the heats and the final of the 4×100-metre freestyle relay as Australia claimed the bronze medal. She swam in the heats of the 4×200-metre freestyle relay and collected a gold when the first-choice quartet won the final in a world record time.

In 2012 at the London Games, Melanie anchored the 4×100-metre freestyle relay team to overcome a late surge by the Netherlands to win the gold medal for Australia, the only gold medal for the Australian swimming team at the 2012 Summer Olympics. She also won two silver medals in the Women's 4 × 200 metre freestyle relay and Women's 4 × 100 metre medley relay.

In 2014, she broke a world record as a part of the Gold Medal-winning Women's 4 × 100 metre freestyle relay. The world record surpassed the previous record set in the "super suit" era of swimming.

Following the 2015 World Championships, now swimming as Melanie Wright, she suffered a recurrence of a rib stress fracture that plagued the later part of her career. At the same time, Wright gained entry into the medical program at Bond University and retired from the sport to become a doctor.

Melanie is a brand ambassador for Speedo, Bodyscience, Brisbane Lions, Qld Games Foundation and the Deniliquin Ute Muster. Melanie now works as a doctor on the Sunshine Coast.

== Personal bests ==
Long course
| Event | Time | Date | Location |
|---|---|---|---|
| 50 m freestyle | 24.39 | 2014-07-26 | Glasgow, Scotland |
| 100 m freestyle | 53.38 | 2012-08-01 | London, England |
| 100 m freestyle (Relay Split) | 52.47 | 2012-08-08 | London, England |
| 200 m freestyle | 1.56.73 | 2012-03-17 | Adelaide, Australia |
| 200 m freestyle (Relay Split) | 1:55.58 | 2012-08-06 | London, England |

== Personal life ==
Melanie wed fellow Olympic swimmer Chris Wright in September 2014 in Brisbane, Australia. Their bridal party included fellow Olympians Leisel Jones, Alice Tait (Mills), Christian Sprenger and Gregor Tait.

The Wrights have two children, a boy and a girl, and continued studying while raising her children.

== Academic qualifications ==
2016 – 2020: Doctor of Medicine including Bachelor of Medical Studies – Bond University

2013 – 2015: Master of Business Administration (MBA) – Bond University

2005 – 2009: Bachelor of Science, Majoring in Biomedicine – University of Queensland

2012 – 2012: Diploma of Business – QLD TAFE

2012 – 2012: Certificate III & IV in Fitness – Fitnance

== See also ==
- List of Olympic medalists in swimming (women)
- List of World Aquatics Championships medalists in swimming (women)
- List of Commonwealth Games medallists in swimming (women)
- World record progression 4 × 100 metres freestyle relay
