= Wang Shijia =

Chinese swimmer

Personal information
- Nationality: China
- Born: August 25, 1993 (age 32) Liaoning, China
- Height: 1.73 m (5 ft 8 in)
- Weight: 62 kg (137 lb)

Sport
- Sport: Swimming
- Strokes: Freestyle
Medal record
Women's swimming
Representing China
Summer Universiade
Silver medal – second place	2015 Gwangju	4×200 m freestyle

Wang Shijia is a Chinese swimmer. She competed at the 2012 Summer Olympics in the Women's 4 x 100 metre freestyle relay and Women's 200 metre freestyle for China.

== See also ==
- China at the 2012 Summer Olympics - Swimming
