= Kathleen Stoody =

Canadian swimmer

Personal information
- Full name: Kathleen Erin Phelan Stoody
- Nationality: Canadian
- Born: March 10, 1982 (age 44) North Vancouver, British Columbia

Sport
- Sport: Swimming
- Strokes: breaststroke
- College team: Simon Fraser Red Leafs
Medal record
Pan American Games
| Silver medal – second place | 2003 Santo Domingo | 4×100 m medley |
| Bronze medal – third place | 2003 Santo Domingo | 100 m breaststroke |
| Bronze medal – third place | 2003 Santo Domingo | 200 m breaststroke |
- Updated on 17 January 2014

Kathleen Erin Phelan Stoody (born March 10, 1982, in North Vancouver, British Columbia) is a breaststroke swimmer from Canada, who won two medals (silver and bronze) at the 2003 Pan American Games in Santo Domingo, Dominican Republic.
