= 2010 Pan Pacific Swimming Championships =

Swimming competition

- Host city: Irvine, California, United States
- Date: August 18–22, 2010
- Venue: William Woollett Jr. Aquatics Center
- Nations: 22
- Events: 42

The eleventh edition of the Pan Pacific Swimming Championships, also known as the 2010 Mutual of Omaha Pan Pacific Swimming Championships, a long course (50 m) event, was held in Irvine, California, United States, from August 18–22.

== Medal table ==
* Host nation (United States)

Rank	Nation	Gold	Silver	Bronze	Total
1	United States (USA)*	28	18	10	56
2	Australia (AUS)	6	15	11	32
3	Japan (JPN)	3	5	5	13
4	Canada (CAN)	2	2	7	11
5	Brazil (BRA)	2	2	4	8
6	South Korea (KOR)	1	1	0	2
7	China (CHN)	0	0	2	2
7	South Africa (RSA)	0	0	2	2
9	Chile (CHI)	0	0	1	1
9	New Zealand (NZL)	0	0	1	1
Totals (10 entries)		42	43	43	128

By agreement of the charter nations, medals from the 50 m backstroke, breaststroke, and butterfly events would not count towards the official medals standings. These events are not typically swum at the Pan Pacific Championships, but were added to the schedule because the meet served as a qualifying meet for several other large international competitions.

== Events ==
The swimming program for 2010 had a total number of 42 events (21 each for men and women). The following events were contested:

- Freestyle: 50 m, 100 m, 200 m, 400 m, 800 m, 1500 m
- Backstroke: 50 m, 100 m, 200 m
- Breaststroke: 50 m, 100 m, 200 m
- Butterfly: 50, 100 m, 200 m
- Individual medley: 200 m, 400 m
- Relay: 4×100 m free, 4×200 m free; 4×100 m medley
- Marathon: 10 km

The 50 m butterfly, 50 m backstroke, and 50 m breaststroke events did not count toward the team scores.

== Qualifying criteria ==
Unlike the World Championships and Olympic Games, nations can enter as many people as they like in the preliminaries of each event (in most international meets, only two swimmers from each nation are permitted). However, only two swimmers per nation can qualify for the semi-finals and finals. Prior to FINA's creation of semi-finals in the late 1990s, a total of 3 swimmers per country could qualify for the final and consolation heats of an event, with no more than 2 swimmers per country in a final or consolation.

For relays, each country may enter up to one team in each relay event to swim in the final heat and count toward the team score. Countries may also enter a “B” relay that will swim in a preceding heat. These “B” relays may not score points and are not eligible for medals. An NOC may enter up to 1 swimmer per sex (2 total), if they have no swimmers meeting any qualifying B standard.

== Results ==
=== Men's events ===
Event	Gold		Silver		Bronze	
50 m freestyle	Nathan Adrian (USA)	21.55 CR	César Cielo (BRA)	21.57	Brent Hayden (CAN)	21.89
100 m freestyle	Nathan Adrian (USA)	48.15 CR	Brent Hayden (CAN)	48.19	César Cielo (BRA)	48.48
200 m freestyle	Ryan Lochte (USA)	1:45.30	Park Tae-Hwan (KOR)	1:46.27	Peter Vanderkaay (USA)	1:46.65
400 m freestyle	Park Tae-Hwan (KOR)	3:44.73	Ryan Cochrane (CAN)	3:46.78	Zhang Lin (CHN)	3:46.91
800 m freestyle	Ryan Cochrane (CAN)	7:48.71	Chad La Tourette (USA)	7:51.62	Takeshi Matsuda (JPN)	7:51.87
1500 m freestyle	Ryan Cochrane (CAN)	14:49.47	Chad La Tourette (USA)	14:54.48	Zhang Lin (CHN)	14:58.90
50 m backstroke*	Junya Koga (JPN)	24.86	Ashley Delaney (AUS)	24.98	Nick Thoman (USA)	25.02
100 m backstroke	Aaron Peirsol (USA)	53.31 CR	Junya Koga (JPN)	53.63	Ashley Delaney (AUS)	53.67
200 m backstroke	Ryan Lochte (USA)	1:54.12 CR	Tyler Clary (USA)	1:54.90	Ryosuke Irie (JPN)	1:55.21
50 m breaststroke*	Felipe Silva (BRA)	27.26	Mark Gangloff (USA)	27.52	Scott Dickens (CAN)	27.63
100 m breaststroke	Kosuke Kitajima (JPN)	59.35	Christian Sprenger (AUS)	1:00.18	Mark Gangloff (USA)	1:00.24
200 m breaststroke	Kosuke Kitajima (JPN)	2.08.36 CR	Brenton Rickard (AUS)	2.09.97	Eric Shanteau (USA)	2.10.13
50 m butterfly*	César Cielo (BRA)	23.03 CR	Nicholas Santos (BRA)	23.33	Roland Schoeman (RSA)	23.39
100 m butterfly	Michael Phelps (USA)	50.86 CR	Tyler McGill (USA)	51.85	Takuro Fujii (JPN)	52.12
200 m butterfly	Michael Phelps (USA)	1:54.11	Nick D'Arcy (AUS)	1:54.73	Takeshi Matsuda (JPN)	1:54.81
200 m individual medley	Ryan Lochte (USA)	1:54.43 CR	Tyler Clary (USA)	1:57.61	Thiago Pereira (BRA)	1:57.83
400 m individual medley	Ryan Lochte (USA)	4:07.59 CR	Tyler Clary (USA)	4:09.55	Thiago Pereira (BRA)	4:12.09
4×100 m freestyle relay	United States; Michael Phelps (48.13) CR; Ryan Lochte (47.98); Jason Lezak (48.12); Nathan Adrian (47.51)	3:11.74 CR	Australia; Eamon Sullivan (49.19); Kyle Richardson (48.48); Cameron Prosser (48.38); James Magnussen (48.25)	3:14.30	South Africa; Lyndon Ferns (49.19); Gideon Louw (48.40); Roland Schoeman (49.95); Graeme Moore (48.39)	3:15.93
4×200 m freestyle relay	United States; Michael Phelps (1:45.62); Peter Vanderkaay (1:46.46); Ricky Berens (1:46.49); Ryan Lochte (1:45.27)	7:03.84 CR	Japan; Takeshi Matsuda (1:47.08); Yuki Kobori (1:47.90); Yoshihiro Okumura (1:48.17); Sho Uchida (1:47.86)	7:11.01	Australia; Thomas Fraser-Holmes (1:47.70); Nicholas Ffrost (1:47.71); Kenrick Monk (1:46.82); Leith Brodie (1:48.82)	7:11.05
4×100 m medley relay	United States; Aaron Peirsol (53.91); Mark Gangloff (1:00.45); Michael Phelps (50.58); Nathan Adrian (47.54)	3:32.48	Japan; Junya Koga (53.87); Kosuke Kitajima (59.18); Masayuki Kishida (52.07); Takuro Fujii (48.78)	3:33.90	Australia; Ashley Delaney (53.97); Christian Sprenger (1:01.21); Geoff Huegill (51.45); Kyle Richardson (48.92)	3:35.55
10 km open water	Chip Peterson (USA)	1:56:00.02	Fran Crippen (USA)	1:56.02.74	Richard Weinberger (CAN)	1:56:02.98

=== Women's events ===
Event	Gold		Silver		Bronze	
50 m freestyle	Jessica Hardy (USA)	24.63 CR	Amanda Weir (USA)	24.70	Victoria Poon (CAN)	24.76
100 m freestyle	Natalie Coughlin (USA)	53.67 CR	Emily Seebohm (AUS); Dana Vollmer (USA)	53.96	Not awarded	
200 m freestyle	Allison Schmitt (USA)	1:56.10 CR	Morgan Scroggy (USA)	1:57.13	Blair Evans (AUS)	1:57.27
400 m freestyle	Chloe Sutton (USA)	4:05.19	Katie Goldman (AUS)	4:05.84	Blair Evans (AUS)	4:06.36
800 m freestyle	Kate Ziegler (USA)	8:21.59	Chloe Sutton (USA)	8:24.51	Katie Goldman (AUS)	8:26.38
1500 m freestyle	Melissa Gorman (AUS)	16:01.53	Kate Ziegler (USA)	16:03.26	Kristel Köbrich (CHI)	16:06.57
50 m backstroke*	Sophie Edington (AUS)	27.83	Aya Terakawa (JPN)	28.04	Emily Thomas (NZL); Fabiola Molina (BRA); Rachel Bootsma (USA)	28.44
100 m backstroke	Emily Seebohm (AUS)	59.45 CR	Aya Terakawa (JPN)	59.59	Natalie Coughlin (USA)	59.70
200 m backstroke	Elizabeth Beisel (USA)	2:07.83	Elizabeth Pelton (USA)	2:08.10	Belinda Hocking (AUS)	2:08.60
50 m breaststroke*	Jessica Hardy (USA)	30.03	Leiston Pickett (AUS)	30.75	Leisel Jones (AUS)	30.78
100 m breaststroke	Rebecca Soni (USA)	1:04.93 CR	Leisel Jones (AUS)	1:05.66	Sarah Katsoulis (AUS)	1:07.04
200 m breaststroke	Rebecca Soni (USA)	2:20.69 CR	Leisel Jones (AUS)	2:23.23	Annamay Pierse (CAN)	2:23.65
50 m butterfly*	Marieke Guehrer (AUS)	25.99 =CR	Emily Seebohm (AUS)	26.08	Christine Magnuson (USA)	26.33
100 m butterfly	Dana Vollmer (USA)	57.56	Christine Magnuson (USA)	57.95	Alicia Coutts (AUS)	57.99
200 m butterfly	Jessicah Schipper (AUS)	2:06.90	Teresa Crippen (USA)	2:06.93	Kathleen Hersey (USA)	2:07.27
200 m individual medley	Emily Seebohm (AUS)	2:09.93 CR	Ariana Kukors (USA)	2:10.25	Caitlin Leverenz (USA)	2:11.21
400 m individual medley	Elizabeth Beisel (USA)	4:34.69	Samantha Hamill (AUS)	4:37.84	Caitlin Leverenz (USA)	4:38.03
4×100 m freestyle relay	United States; Natalie Coughlin (54.25); Jessica Hardy (53.43); Amanda Weir (53.85); Dana Vollmer (53.58)	3:35.11 CR	Australia; Yolane Kukla (55.51); Emily Seebohm (53.86); Alicia Coutts (54.34); Felicity Galvez (54.35)	3:38.06	Canada; Victoria Poon (54.46); Julia Wilkinson (54.60); Erica Morningstar (54.73); Genevieve Saumur(54.35)	3:38.14; NR
4×200 m freestyle relay	United States; Dana Vollmer (1:58.05); Morgan Scroggy (1:57.89); Katie Hoff (1:58.70); Allison Schmitt (1:56.57)	7:51.21 CR	Australia; Blair Evans (1:58.31); Kylie Palmer (1:58.01); Katie Goldman (1:58.19); Meagen Nay (1:58.13)	7:52.64	Canada; Geneviève Saumur (1:58.52); Julia Wilkinson (1:58.20); Barbara Jardin (1:58.46); Samantha Cheverton (1:59.14)	7:54.32
4×100 m medley relay	United States; Natalie Coughlin (59.85); Rebecca Soni (1:05.35); Dana Vollmer (56.91); Jessica Hardy (53.12)	3:55.23 CR	Australia; Emily Seebohm (59.34) CR; Leisel Jones (1:05.38); Alicia Coutts (57.86); Yolane Kukla (54.38)	3:56.96	Japan; Aya Terakawa (59.41); Satomi Suzuki (1:06.54); Yuka Kato (57.96); Haruka Ueda (53.84)	3:57.75
10 km open water	Christine Jennings (USA)	2:00:33.83	Eva Fabian (USA)	2:00:35.76	Melissa Gorman (AUS)	2:00:56.57

== Participating nations ==
- Argentina
- Australia
- Brazil
- Canada
- Cayman Islands
- Chile
- China
- Chinese Taipei
- Ecuador
- Hong Kong
- Japan
- New Zealand
- Papua New Guinea
- Peru
- Philippines
- Singapore
- South Korea
- South Africa
- Trinidad and Tobago
- Tunisia
- United States
- Zimbabwe

== See also ==
- All-time Pan Pacific Championships medal table
- List of Championships Records
