= Amanda Weir =

American swimmer (born 1986)

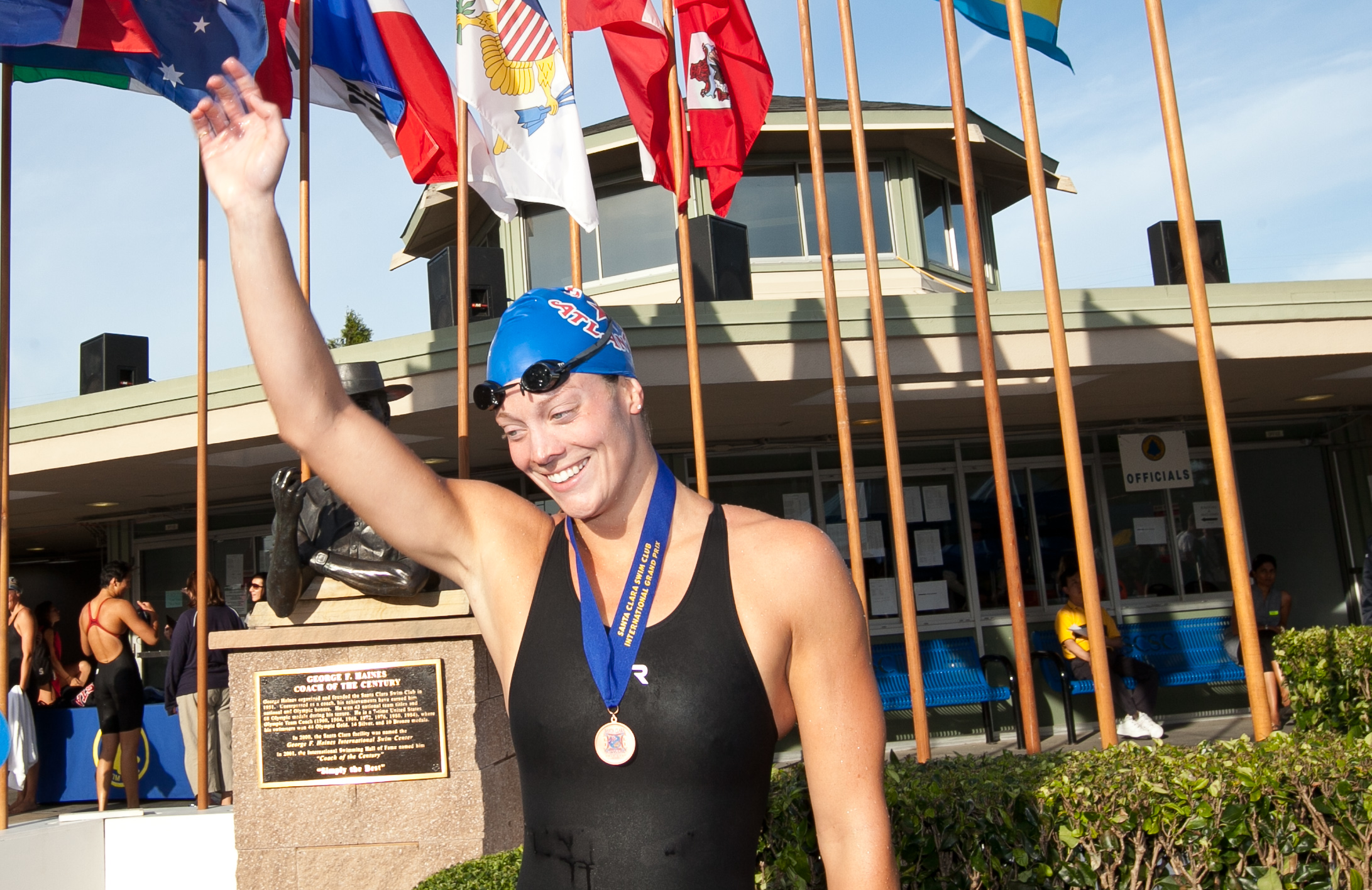
- Weir in 2011

Personal information
- Full name: Amanda Jo Weir
- National team: United States
- Born: March 11, 1986 (age 40) Davenport, Iowa, U.S.
- Height: 6 ft 1 in (185 cm)
- Weight: 165 lb (75 kg)

Sport
- Sport: Swimming
- Strokes: Freestyle
- College team: University of Georgia; University of Southern California
Medal record
Women's swimming
Representing the United States
Event	1st	2nd	3rd
Olympic Games	0	3	1
World Championships (LC)	2	4	1
World Championships (SC)	2	7	1
Pan Pacific Championships	3	2	0
Pan American Games	3	1	0
Total	10	17	3
Olympic Games
Silver medal – second place	2004 Athens	4×100 m freestyle
Silver medal – second place	2004 Athens	4×100 m medley
Silver medal – second place	2016 Rio de Janeiro	4×100 m freestyle
Bronze medal – third place	2012 London	4×100 m freestyle
World Championships (LC)
Gold medal – first place	2007 Melbourne	4×200 m freestyle
Gold medal – first place	2011 Shanghai	4×100 m medley
Silver medal – second place	2005 Montreal	4×100 m medley
Silver medal – second place	2007 Melbourne	4×100 m freestyle
Silver medal – second place	2007 Melbourne	4×100 m medley
Silver medal – second place	2011 Shanghai	4×100 m freestyle
Bronze medal – third place	2005 Montreal	4×100 m freestyle
World Championships (SC)
Gold medal – first place	2016 Windsor	4x100 m freestyle
Gold medal – first place	2016 Windsor	4x100 m medley
Gold medal – first place	2004 Indianapolis	4×100 m freestyle
Silver medal – second place	2006 Shanghai	4×100 m medley
Silver medal – second place	2004 Indianapolis	4×100 m medley
Silver medal – second place	2010 Dubai	4×100 m freestyle
Silver medal – second place	2010 Dubai	4×100 m medley
Silver medal – second place	2014 Doha	4×50 m freestyle
Silver medal – second place	2014 Doha	4×100 m freestyle
Silver medal – second place	2014 Doha	4×50 m medley
Bronze medal – third place	2006 Shanghai	4×200 m freestyle
Pan Pacific Championships
Gold medal – first place	2006 Victoria	4×100 m freestyle
Gold medal – first place	2006 Victoria	4×100 m medley
Gold medal – first place	2010 Irvine	4×100 m freestyle
Silver medal – second place	2006 Victoria	100 m freestyle
Silver medal – second place	2010 Irvine	50 m freestyle
Pan American Games
Gold medal – first place	2003 Santo Domingo	4×100 m freestyle
Gold medal – first place	2003 Santo Domingo	4×100 m medley
Gold medal – first place	2015 Toronto	4×200 m freestyle
Silver medal – second place	2015 Toronto	4×100 m freestyle

Amanda Jo Weir (born March 11, 1986) is an American competition swimmer, Olympic silver medalist, world champion, and former world record-holder. She was a member of the 2004 and 2012 United States Olympic teams, winning two silver medals at the 2004 Games and a bronze medal in the 4×100-meter freestyle relay at the 2012 Summer Olympics and a silver medal in the 4×100-meter freestyle relay at the 2016 Summer Olympics.

== Career ==
Born in Davenport, Iowa, Weir started swimming while the family lived in Apple Valley, Minnesota.

Weir holds many of the sprint freestyle age-group records for USA Swimming, setting her first record at age 12 in the 50-yard freestyle in 23.17 seconds. She attended Brookwood High School in Snellville, Georgia, and led the Brookwood swim team to four consecutive Georgia Class 5A state championships.

At the 2004 Summer Olympics, Weir swam the third leg for the U.S. team in the women's 4×100-meter freestyle relay. Leading after her leg of the relay, the U.S. team finished second to the Australians, setting an American record with their finishing time. Weir also earned a silver medal by swimming in the preliminary heats of the 4×100-meter medley relay and helping her team qualify for the final.

Weir enrolled as a freshman at the University of Georgia in 2004, where her team dominated the 2005 NCAA championships; Weir anchored four of the unprecedented five winning Georgia relay teams. She was recognized as the Atlanta Amateur Athlete of the Year for 2005. Weir left the University of Georgia after her first year and transferred to the University of Southern California in 2006. After a single semester at USC, Weir decided to end her college swimming career to begin swimming professionally.

At the 2006 ConocoPhillips USA Swimming National Championship, Weir broke the American record in the 100-meter freestyle with a time of 53.58.

At the 2012 United States Olympic Trials in Omaha, Nebraska, Weir made the U.S. Olympic team for the second time by finishing fifth in the 100-meter freestyle with a time of 54.41, which qualified her to swim in the 4×100-meter freestyle as a member of the U.S. relay team. At the 2012 Summer Olympics in London, she earned a bronze medal as a member of the U.S. team in the women's 4×100-meter freestyle relay.

In 2016, she won a silver medal at the Olympic Games in the 4×100-meter freestyle relay.

== Relation to Burl Ives ==
Amanda Weir is the great niece of Burl Ives.

== See also ==
- List of Olympic medalists in swimming (women)
- List of Pan American Games records in swimming
- List of United States records in swimming
- List of University of Georgia people
- List of University of Southern California people
- List of World Aquatics Championships medalists in swimming (women)
- World record progression 4 × 100 metres medley relay
