= Victoria Poon =

Canadian swimmer (born 1984)

Personal information
- Full name: Cheuk Yuen Victoria Poon
- National team: Canada
- Born: October 12, 1984 (age 41) Hong Kong
- Height: 1.84 m (6 ft 0 in)
- Weight: 73 kg (161 lb)

Sport
- Sport: Swimming
- Strokes: Freestyle
- Club: Piscines du Parc Olympique
Medal record
Women's swimming
Representing Canada
World Championships (LC)
Bronze medal – third place	2015 Kazan	4×100 m mixed freestyle
Pan Pacific Championships
Silver medal – second place	2006 Victoria	4x100 m free relay
Commonwealth Games
Bronze medal – third place	2006 Melbourne	4x100 m freestyle relay
Bronze medal – third place	2014 Glasgow	4×100 m freestyle relay

Cheuk Yuen Victoria Poon (Chinese name 潘卓源) (born October 12, 1984) is a Canadian competitive swimmer who specialises in freestyle events. She was born in Hong Kong. She moved to Canada when she was 11 years old. She lives in the LaSalle borough of Montreal, Quebec. She is the former national record holder in the women's 50m freestyle, with a time of 24.75s.

== Career ==
Poon's long time swim club has been the Club de natation Calac de LaSalle.

In 2005, Poon set the Canadian national record for women's 50-metre freestyle, at 25.52 seconds.

Poon competed at the 2006 Commonwealth Games, and won a bronze with the Canadian team in the women's 4x100-metre freestyle relay.

In the April 2008 Canadian Olympic Trials, Poon lowered her Canadian record for women's 50-metre freestyle to 25.47 seconds, which she has set in 2005. At the 2008 Canadian Summer Open Nationals, she finished 3rd in the women's 50m freestyle event, behind Jennifer Carroll (2nd) and Jen Beckberger (1st).

Poon competed at the 2008 Summer Olympics and finished 30th in the women's 50-metre freestyle event.

In 2009, Poon set the women's 50-metre freestyle Canadian record at 24.75 seconds. On 19 June 2009, Poon set a new Canadian record for the women's 50m butterfly, of 26.71s, at the Canada Cup of swimming; besting the record set Shona Kitson in 2000 of 27.17s. At that time, Poon was coached by Benoît Lebrun, of the Club de natation des piscines du Parc olympique (CNPPO; literally, Olympic Park Swimming Pools Swim Club).

At the 2010 Canada Cup of Swimming, short course, Poon won gold for the women's 100-metre freestyle, and 50-metre butterfly. At the time, she was also the Canadian national record holder for those two events.

At the 2010 World Swimming Championships, short course, Poon set and then bettered the Canadian national record for women's 100-metre freestyle. She set a new record on 16 December 2010 of 52.76 seconds in the semi-finals. On December 17, 2010, in the finals, she reset it to 52.51 seconds, and managed to finish fifth. In the 50m freestyle, she lowered her own Canadian record to 29.14s. She ended with a 7th-place ranking.

In the March 2011 Canadian World Championship Trials, Poon finished second, behind Julia Wilkinson, in the women's 100m freestyle race.

Poon competed at the 2012 Summer Olympics and finished 16th in the women's 50-metre freestyle event.

== Personal bests ==
Event	Data	Date	Meet	Notes
50m freestyle (short course)	29.14s	December 2010	2010 World Swimming Championships, short course	Canadian Record
50m freestyle	25.52s	2005		Canadian Record
50m freestyle	25.47s	April 2008	Canadian Olympic Trials	Canadian Record
50m freestyle	24.75s	2009		Canadian Record
50m butterfly	26.71s	June 19, 2009	2009 Canada Cup of Swimming	Canadian Record
100m freestyle (short course)	52.76s	December 16, 2010	2010 World Swimming Championships, short course	Canadian Record
100m freestyle (short course)	52.51s	December 17, 2010	2010 World Swimming Championships, short course	Canadian Record

== See also ==
- List of World Aquatics Championships medalists in swimming (women)
- List of Commonwealth Games medallists in swimming (women)
- World record progression 4 × 100 metres medley relay
