= Swimming at the 2010 Commonwealth Games =

- Venue: Dr. S.P. Mukherjee Swimming Stadium, Talkatora Gardens
- Location: Delhi, India
- Dates: 4 to 13 October 2010
- Competitors: 458 from 42 nations

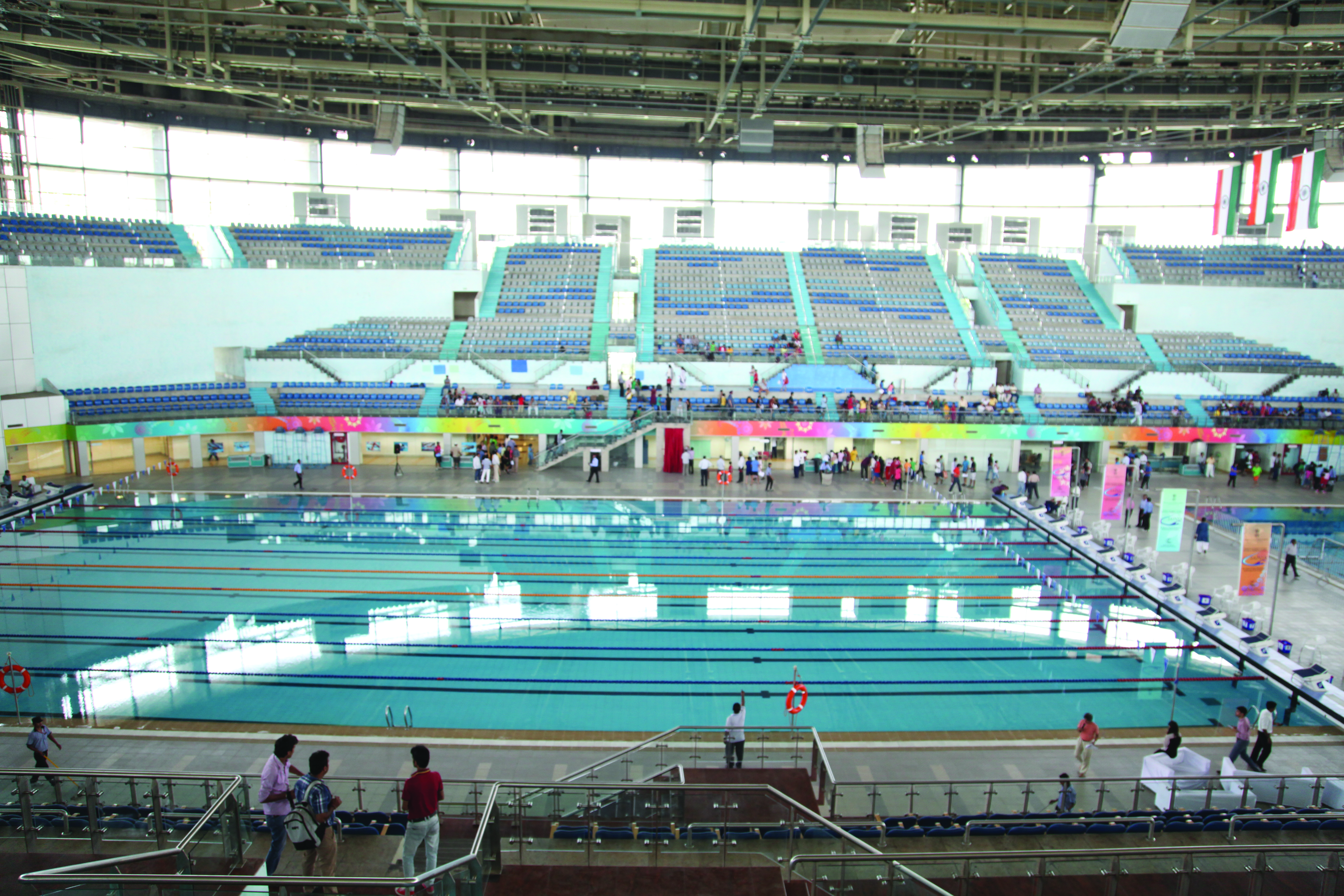
The Dr. S.P. Mukherjee Swimming Stadium

Swimming at the 2010 Commonwealth Games was the 19th appearances of Swimming at the Commonwealth Games. Competition was held in Delhi, India, from 4 to 13 October 2010 and featured contests in 44 disciplines.

The swimming events took place at the Dr. S.P. Mukherjee Swimming Stadium in Talkatora Gardens.

Australia topped the medal table by virtue of winning 22 gold medals.

== Medal table ==
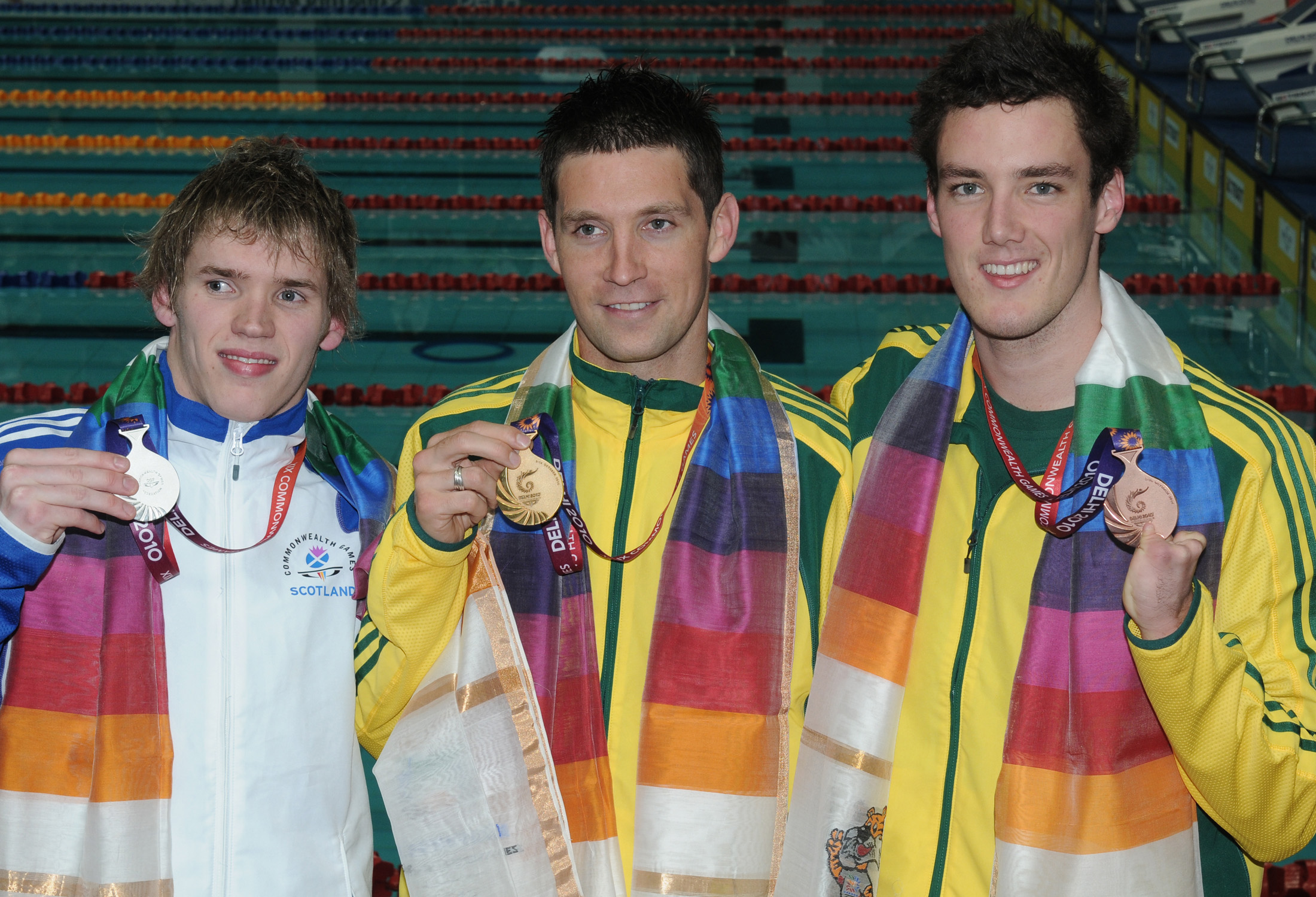
XIX Commonwealth Games-2010 Delhi Winners of (Men`s) 100m Swimming Freestyle, Ben Austin of Australia (Gold), Sean Fraser of Scotland (Silver) and B. Cochrane of Australia (Bronze)

Rank	Nation	Gold	Silver	Bronze	Total
1	Australia	22	16	16	54
2	England	7	16	11	34
3	South Africa	7	4	5	16
4	Canada	5	1	4	10
5	Scotland	2	3	1	6
6	Kenya	1	0	0	1
7	New Zealand	0	4	2	6
8	Wales	0	1	3	4
9	Papua New Guinea	0	1	0	1
10	India*	0	0	1	1
Totals (10 entries)		44	46	43	133

== Medallists ==
=== Men ===
Event	Gold		Silver		Bronze	
50 m freestyle	Brent Hayden; Canada	22.01 CR	Roland Schoeman; South Africa	22.14	Gideon Louw; South Africa	22.22
50 m freestyle S9	Matthew Cowdrey; Australia	25.33; WR	Simon Miller; England	26.70	Prasanta Karmakar; India	27.48
100 m freestyle	Brent Hayden; Canada	47.98; GR	Simon Burnett; England	48.54	Eamon Sullivan; Australia	48.69
100 m freestyle S8	Ben Austin; Australia	1:00.44	Sean Fraser; Scotland	1:00.77	Blake Cochrane; Australia	1:00.95
100 m freestyle S10	Benoît Huot; Canada	53.70; GR	Andrew Pasterfield; Australia	55.04	Rob Welbourn; England	55.10
200 m freestyle	Robert Renwick; Scotland	1:47.88	Kenrick Monk; Australia	1:47.90	Thomas Fraser-Holmes; Australia	1:48.22
400 m freestyle	Ryan Cochrane; Canada	3:48.48	Ryan Napoleon; Australia	3:48.59	David Carry; Scotland	3:50.06
1500 m freestyle	Ryan Cochrane; Canada	15:01.49	Heerden Herman; South Africa	15:03.70	Daniel Fogg; England	15:13.50
50 m backstroke	Liam Tancock; England	24.62; GR	Hayden Stoeckel; Australia	25.08	Ashley Delaney; Australia	25.21
100 m backstroke	Liam Tancock; England	53.59; GR	Daniel Bell; New Zealand	54.43	Ashley Delaney; Australia	54.51
200 m backstroke	James Goddard; England	1:55.58; GR	Gareth Kean; New Zealand	1:57.37	Ashley Delaney; Australia	1:58.18
50 m breaststroke	Cameron van der Burgh; South Africa	27.18; GR	Glenn Snyders; New Zealand; Brenton Rickard; Australia	27.67		
100 m breaststroke	Cameron van der Burgh; South Africa	1:00.10	Christian Sprenger; Australia	1:00.29	Brenton Rickard; Australia	1:00.46
200 m breaststroke	Brenton Rickard; Australia	2:10.89; GR	Michael Jamieson; Scotland	2:10.97	Christian Sprenger; Australia	2:11.44
50 m butterfly	Jason Dunford; Kenya	23.35	Geoff Huegill; Australia	23.37	Roland Schoeman; South Africa	23.44
100 m butterfly	Geoff Huegill; Australia	51.69; GR	Ryan Pini; Papua New Guinea; Antony James; England	52.50		
200 m butterfly	Chad le Clos; South Africa	1:56.48; GR	Michael Rock; England	1:57.15	Stefan Hirniak; Canada	1:57.26
200 m individual medley	James Goddard; England	1:58.10; GR	Joseph Roebuck; England	1:59.86	Leith Brodie; Australia	2:00.00
400 m individual medley	Chad le Clos; South Africa	4:13.25; GR	Joseph Roebuck; England	4:15.84	Riaan Schoeman; South Africa	4:16.86
4 × 100 m freestyle relay	Australia; Kyle Richardson; Eamon Sullivan; Tommaso D'Orsogna; James Magnussen; Cameron Prosser*	3:13.92; GR	England; Adam Brown; Simon Burnett; Ross Davenport; Grant Turner	3:15.05	South Africa; Gideon Louw; Graeme Moore; Roland Schoeman; Darian Townsend	3:15.21
4 × 200 m freestyle relay	Australia; Thomas Fraser-Holmes; Nicholas Ffrost; Ryan Napoleon; Kenrick Monk; Leith Brodie*	7:10.29; GR	Scotland; Andrew Hunter; David Carry; Jak Scott; Robert Renwick; Lewis Smith*; Cameron Brodie*	7:14.02	South Africa; Jean Basson; Darian Townsend; Jan Venter; Chad le Clos; Sebastien Rousseau*; Heerden Herman*	7:14.18
4 × 100 m medley relay	Australia; Ashley Delaney; Brenton Rickard; Geoff Huegill; Eamon Sullivan; Christian Sprenger*; Kyle Richardson*	3:33.15; GR	South Africa; Charl Crous; Cameron van der Burgh; Chad le Clos; Gideon Louw; Sebastien Rousseau*; Jean Basson*	3:36.12	England; Liam Tancock; Daniel Sliwinski; Antony James; Simon Burnett; Christopher Walker-Hebborn*; Adam Brown*	3:36.31

Legend

- WR: World record, (EAD events: World record)
- GR: Games record
- *: Swam only in the heats

=== Women ===
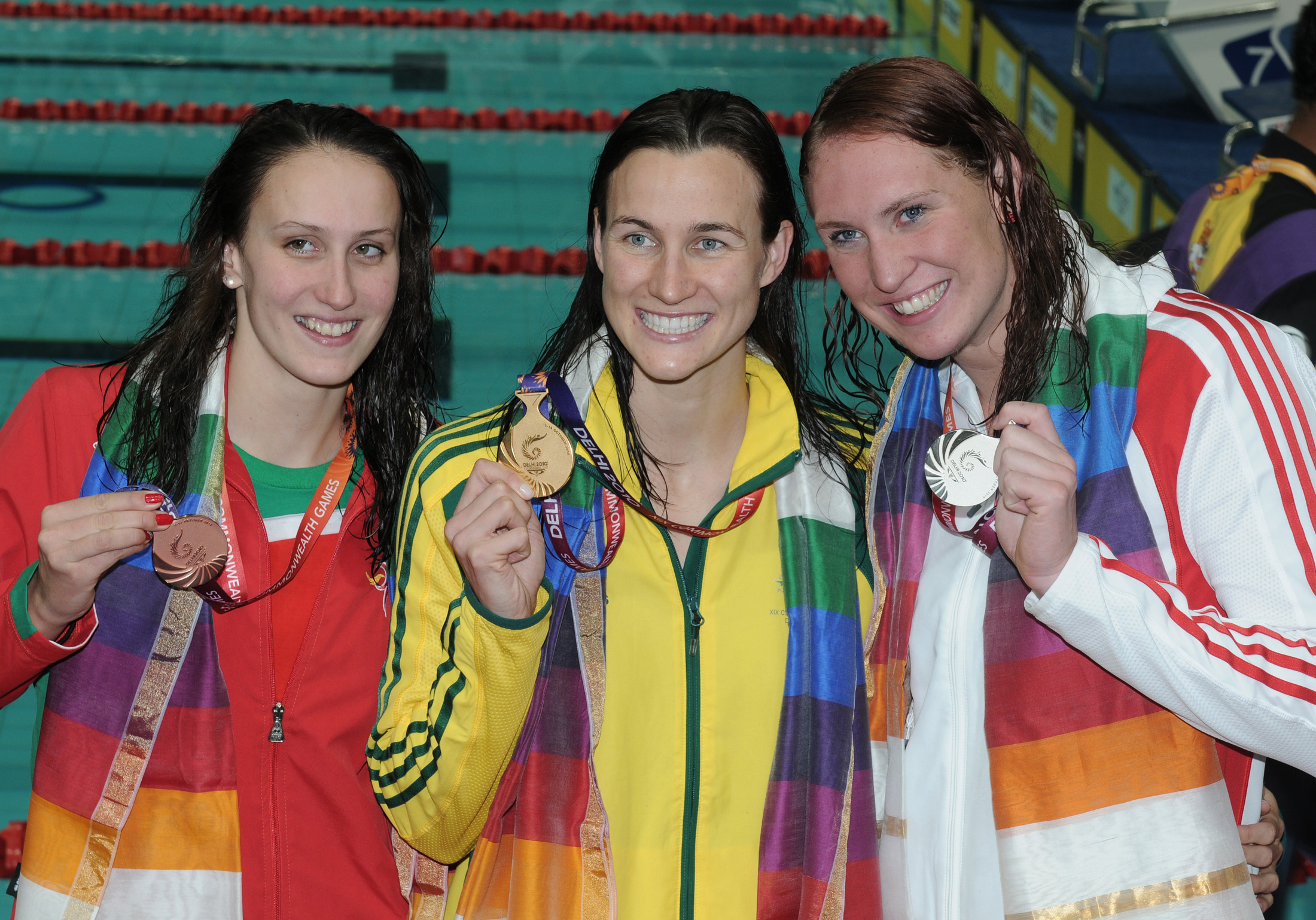
XIX Commonwealth Games-2010 Delhi Winners of (Women`s) 50m Swimming Backstroke, Edington of Australia (Gold), Gemma Spofforth of England (Silver) and Emily Seebohm of Australia (Bronze)

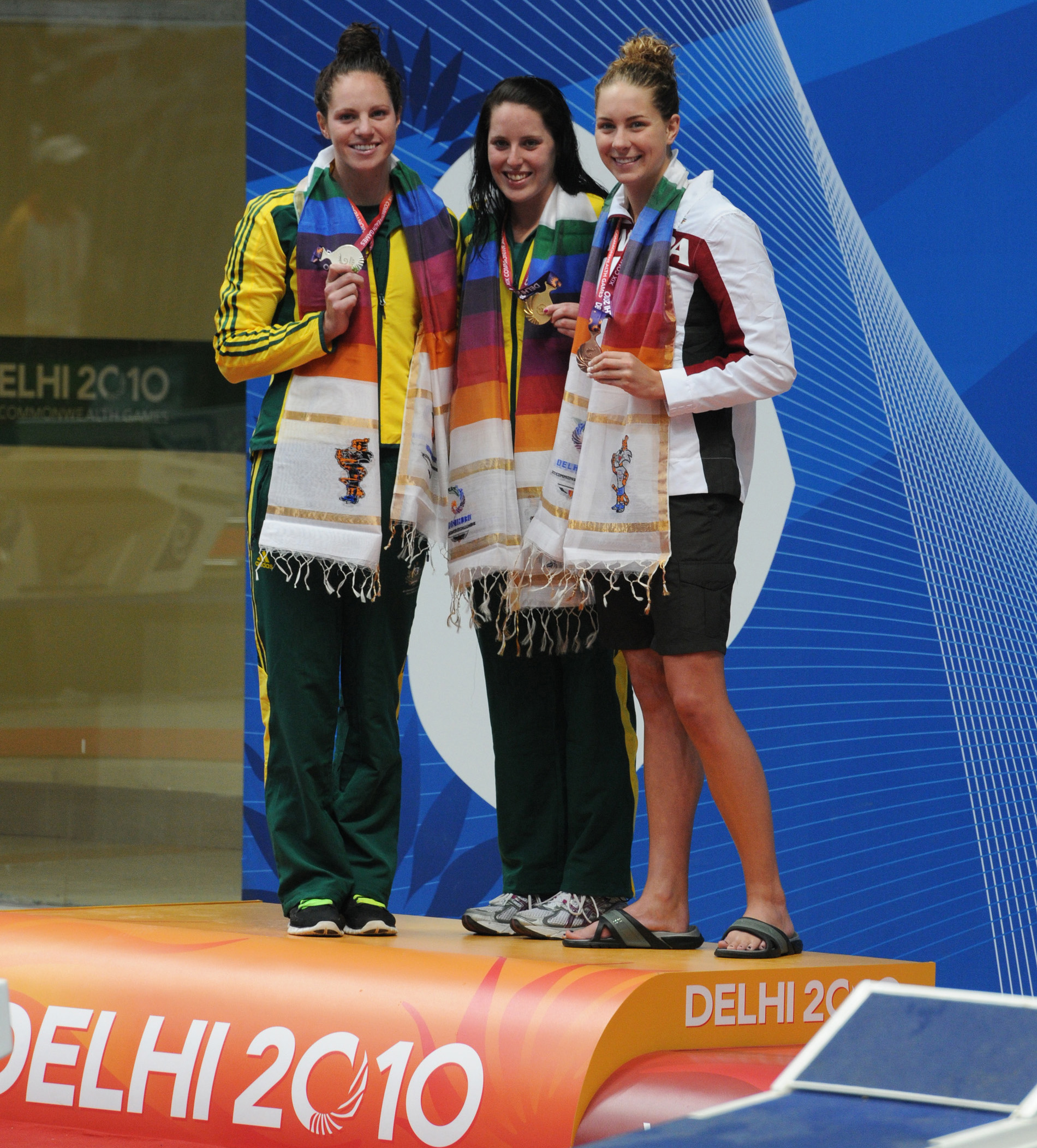
XIX Commonwealth Games-2010 Delhi Winners of Women’s 200m Individual Medley, Alicia Coutts from Australia (Gold), Emily Seebohm from Australia (Silver) and J. Wilkinson from Canada (Bronze)

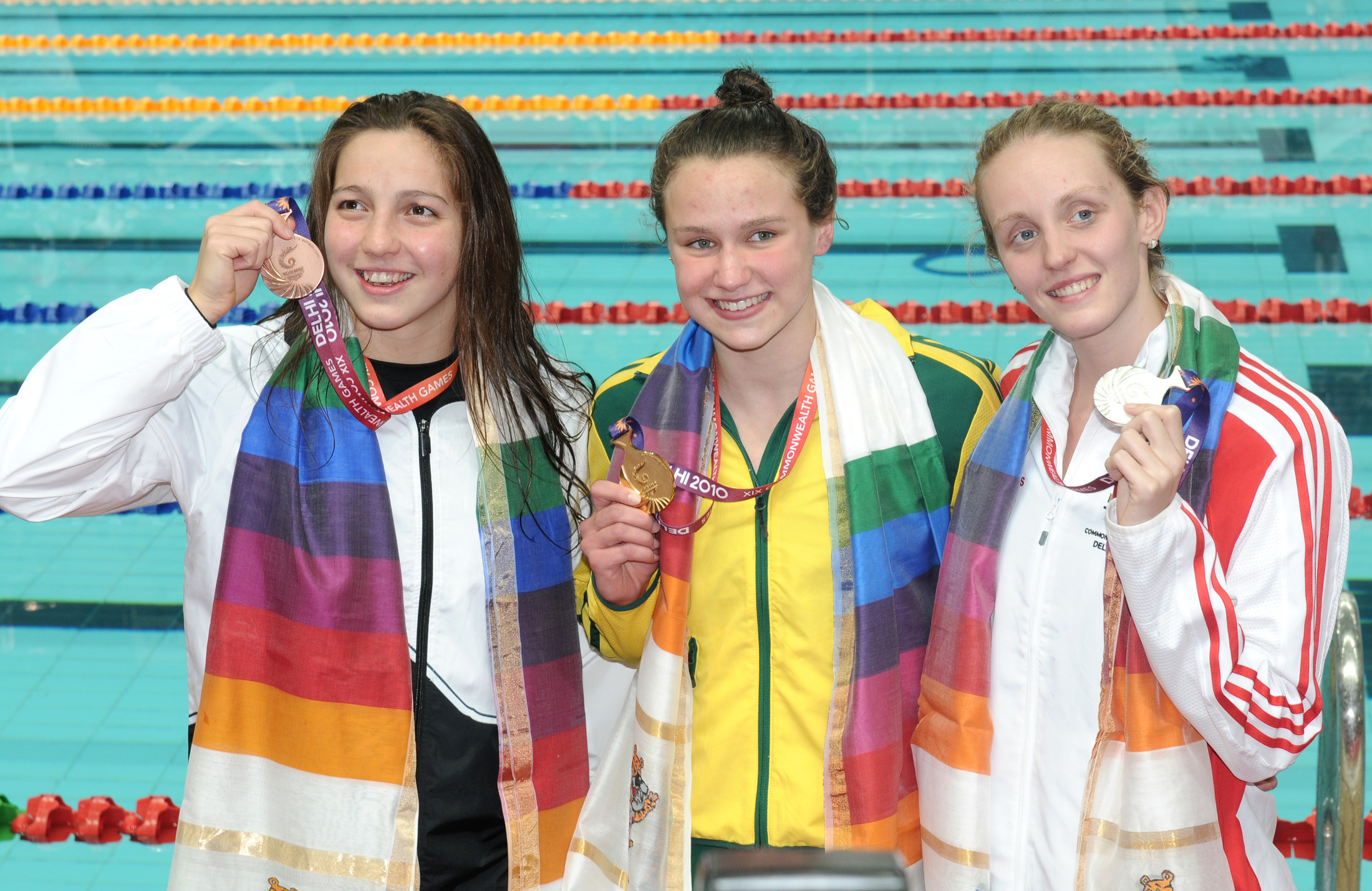
XIX Commonwealth Games-2010 Delhi Winners of (Women`s) 50m Swimming Butterfly, Yolane Kukla of Australia (Gold), Fran Halsall of England (Silver) and Hayley Palmer of New Zealand (Bronze)

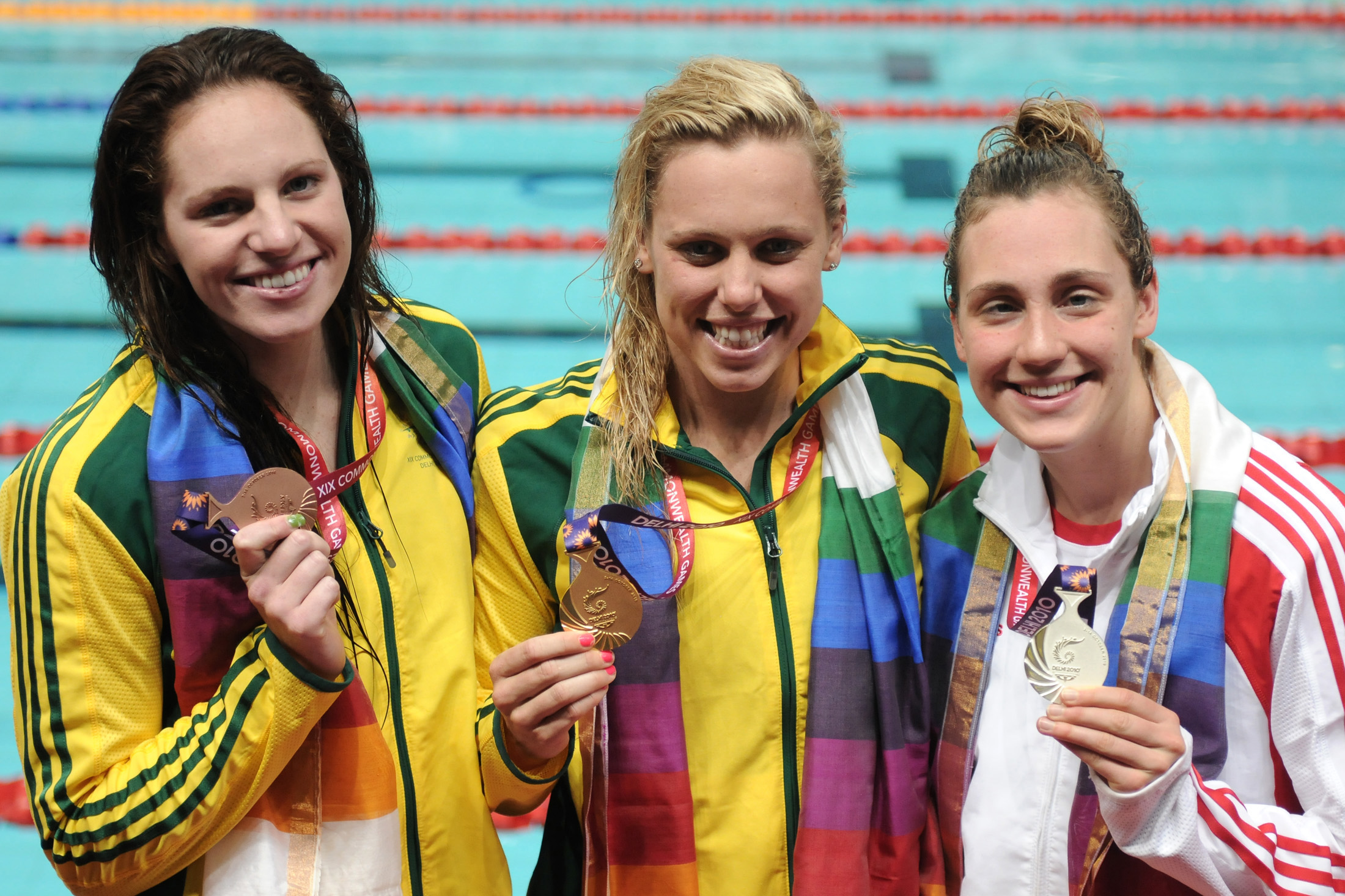
XIX Commonwealth Games-2010 Delhi Winners of (Women `s) 200m Swimming Backstroke, Nay Maegen of South Africa (Gold), E. Simmonds of England (Silver) and Emily Seebohm of Australia (Bronze)

Event	Gold		Silver		Bronze	
50 m freestyle	Yolane Kukla; Australia	24.86	Francesca Halsall; England	24.98	Hayley Palmer; New Zealand	25.01
50 m freestyle S9	Natalie du Toit; South Africa	29.17; GR	Annabelle Williams; Australia	29.42	Stephanie Millward; England	29.69
100 m freestyle	Alicia Coutts; Australia	54.09	Emily Seebohm; Australia	54.30	Francesca Halsall; England	54.57
100 m freestyle S9	Natalie du Toit; South Africa	1:02.36; GR	Stephanie Millward; England	1:03.69	Ellie Cole; Australia	1:05.20
200 m freestyle	Kylie Palmer; Australia	1:57.50	Jazmin Carlin; Wales	1:58.29	Rebecca Adlington; England	1:58.47
400 m freestyle	Rebecca Adlington; England	4:05.68; GR	Kylie Palmer; Australia	4:07.85	Jazmin Carlin; Wales	4.08.22
800 m freestyle	Rebecca Adlington; England	8:24.69	Wendy Trott; South Africa	8:26.96	Melissa Gorman; Australia	8:32.37
50 m backstroke	Sophie Edington; Australia	28.00; GR	Gemma Spofforth; England	28.03	Georgia Davies; Wales; Emily Seebohm; Australia	28.33
100 m backstroke	Emily Seebohm; Australia	59.79	Gemma Spofforth; England	1:00.02	Julia Wilkinson; Canada	1:00.74
200 m backstroke	Meagen Nay; Australia	2:07.56; GR	Elizabeth Simmonds; England	2:07.90	Emily Seebohm; Australia	2:08.28
50 m breaststroke	Leiston Pickett; Australia	30.84	Leisel Jones; Australia	31.10	Kate Haywood; England	31.17
100 m breaststroke	Leisel Jones; Australia	1:05.84	Samantha Marshall; Australia	1:07.97	Kate Haywood; England	1:08.29
200 m breaststroke	Leisel Jones; Australia	2:25.38	Tessa Wallace; Australia	2:25.60	Sarah Katsoulis; Australia	2:25.92
50 m butterfly	Francesca Halsall; England	26.24	Marieke Guehrer; Australia	26.27	Emily Seebohm; Australia	26.29
100 m butterfly	Alicia Coutts; Australia	57.53	Ellen Gandy; England	58.06	Jemma Lowe; Wales	58.42
100 m butterfly S9	Natalie du Toit; South Africa	1:07.32	Stephanie Millward; England	1:13.11	Ellie Cole; Australia	1:14.04
200 m butterfly	Jessicah Schipper; Australia	2:07.04	Audrey Lacroix; Canada	2:07.31	Ellen Gandy; England	2:07.75
200 m individual medley	Alicia Coutts; Australia	2:09.70; GR	Emily Seebohm; Australia	2:10.83	Julia Wilkinson; Canada	2:12.09
400 m individual medley	Hannah Miley; Scotland	4:38.83; GR	Samantha Hamill; Australia	4:39.45	Keri-Anne Payne; England	4:41.07
4 × 100 m freestyle relay	Australia; Alicia Coutts; Marieke Guehrer; Felicity Galvez; Emily Seebohm	3:36.36; GR	England; Amy Smith; Francesca Halsall; Emma Saunders; Jessica Sylvester	3.40.03	New Zealand; Hayley Palmer; Penelope Marshall; Amaka Gessler; Natasha Hind	3.42.12
4 × 200 m freestyle relay	Australia; Kylie Palmer; Blair Evans; Bronte Barratt; Meagen Nay	7:53.71; GR	New Zealand; Lauren Boyle; Penelope Marshall; Amaka Gessler; Natasha Hind	7:57.46	England; Joanne Jackson; Rebecca Adlington; Emma Saunders; Sasha Matthews	7:58.61
4 × 100 m medley relay	Australia; Emily Seebohm; Leisel Jones; Jessicah Schipper; Alicia Coutts	3:56.99	England; Gemma Spofforth; Kate Haywood; Ellen Gandy; Francesca Halsall	4:00.09	Canada; Julia Wilkinson; Annamay Pierse; Audrey Lacroix; Victoria Poon	4:03.96

Legend

- WR: World record, (EAD events: World record)
- GR: Games record

== Participating nations ==
- Antigua and Barbuda (1)
- Australia (52)
- Bangladesh (4)
- Barbados (1)
- Bermuda (3)
- Canada (27)
- Cayman Islands (3)
- Cyprus (7)
- England (42)
- Ghana (3)
- Gibraltar (4)
- Grenada (2)
- Guernsey (5)
- Guyana (1)
- India (48)
- Jamaica (3)
- Jersey (1)
- Kenya (12)
- Lesotho (2)
- Malaysia (14)
- Malawi (5)
- Maldives (6)
- Mozambique (3)
- Mauritius (4)
- Northern Ireland (10)
- New Zealand (12)
- Papua New Guinea (6)
- Rwanda (1)
- Saint Lucia (2)
- Samoa (2)
- Scotland (20)
- Seychelles (5)
- Singapore (9)
- South Africa (14)
- Sri Lanka (8)
- Swaziland (2)
- Tanzania (4)
- Tonga (1)
- Trinidad and Tobago (7)
- Uganda (4)
- Wales (16)
- Zambia (5)

== See also ==
- List of Commonwealth Games records in swimming
