= Swimming at the 2011 World Aquatics Championships – Women's 4 × 100 metre freestyle relay =

Women's 4×100 metre freestyle relay at the 2011 World Aquatics Championships
- Dates: July 24, 2011 (heats and final)
- Competitors: 61 from 14 nations
- Winning time: 3:33.96

Medalists
gold medal	Inge Dekker; Ranomi Kromowidjojo; Marleen Veldhuis; Femke Heemskerk; Maud Van der Meer (heats only)	Netherlands
silver medal	Natalie Coughlin; Missy Franklin; Jessica Hardy; Dana Vollmer	United States
bronze medal	Britta Steffen; Silke Lippok; Lisa Vitting; Daniela Schreiber	Germany

The women's 4×100 metre freestyle relay competition of the swimming events at the 2011 World Aquatics Championships took place July 24. The heats and final took place July 24.

== Records ==
Prior to the competition, the existing world and championship records were as follows.

	Name	Nation	Time	Location	Date
World record Championship record	Inge Dekker (53.61); Ranomi Kromowidjojo (52.30); Femke Heemskerk (53.03); Marleen Veldhuis (52.78)	Netherlands	3:31.72	Rome	July 26, 2009

== Results ==
=== Heats ===
14 teams participated in 2 heats, qualified teams are listed:

Rank	Heat	Lane	Nation	Swimmers	Time	Notes
1	2	4	United States	Amanda Weir (54.35); Missy Franklin (53.57); Kara Lynn Joyce (54.10); Jessica Hardy (53.62)	3:35.64	Q
2	1	2	Netherlands	Marleen Veldhuis (54.41); Ranomi Kromowidjojo (53.66); Maud Van der Meer (54.70); Femke Heemskerk (52.99)	3:35.76	Q
3	2	5	China	Li Zhesi (54.47); Wang Shijia (54.60); Pang Jiaying (54.47); Tang Yi (53.60)	3:37.14	Q
4	1	5	Germany	Britta Steffen (54.86); Silke Lippok (54.23); Lisa Vitting (54.66); Daniela Schreiber (53.53)	3:37.28	Q
5	1	4	Australia	Kelly Stubbins (54.96); Merindah Dingjan (54.36); Yolane Kukla (55.06); Marieke Guehrer (53.97)	3:38.35	Q
6	1	3	Canada	Victoria Poon (54.79); Erica Morningstar (55.24); Chantal van Landeghem (54.33); Geneviève Saumur (54.44)	3:38.80	Q
7	2	3	Japan	Yayoi Matsumoto (54.82); Haruka Ueda (54.13); Hanae Ito (54.75); Natsuki Hasegawa (55.58)	3:39.28	Q
8	1	7	Denmark	Pernille Blume (54.82); Mie Nielsen (55.35); Lotte Friis (55.99); Jeanette Ottesen (53.32)	3:39.48	Q, NR
9	2	6	Great Britain	Amy Smith (54.98); Francesca Halsall (53.35); Caitlin McClatchey (55.82); Rebecca Turner (55.59)	3:39.74	
10	1	6	Sweden	Ida Marko-Varga (55.45); Gabriella Fagundez (54.31); Michelle Coleman (54.56); Petra Granlund (56.13)	3:40.45	
11	2	2	Russia	Veronika Popova (54.95); Margarita Nesterova (55.12); Natalya Lovtsova (55.83); Elena Sokolova (54.83)	3:40.73	
12	2	7	Belarus	Aleksandra Gerasimenya (54.14); Sviatlana Khakhlova (55.55); Yana Parakhouskaya (57.38); Yulia Khitraya (56.34)	3:43.41	
13	2	8	Brazil	Tatiana Lemos (55.68); Daynara de Paula (56.38); Flávia Delaroli (56.73); Michelle Lenhardt (55.83)	3:44.62	
14	2	1	New Zealand	Natasha Hind (55.49); Amaka Gessler (55.00); Sophia Batchelor (58.82); Penelope May Marshall (55.68)	3:44.99	

=== Final ===
The final was held at 19:10.

Rank	Lane	Nation	Swimmers	Time	Notes
1st place, gold medalist(s)	5	Netherlands	Inge Dekker (54.91); Ranomi Kromowidjojo (53.26); Marleen Veldhuis (53.33); Femke Heemskerk (52.46)	3:33.96	
2nd place, silver medalist(s)	4	United States	Natalie Coughlin (54.09); Missy Franklin (52.99); Jessica Hardy (54.12); Dana Vollmer (53.27)	3:34.47	
3rd place, bronze medalist(s)	6	Germany	Britta Steffen (54.51); Silke Lippok (54.17); Lisa Vitting (53.85); Daniela Schreiber (53.12)	3:36.05	
4	3	China	Li Zhesi (54.35); Wang Shijia (54.53); Pang Jiaying (54.36); Tang Yi (53.12)	3:36.36	
5	2	Australia	Bronte Barratt (54.81); Marieke Guehrer (54.37); Merindah Dingjan (54.14); Alicia Coutts (53.43)	3:36.75	
6	7	Canada	Victoria Poon (54.74); Geneviève Saumur (55.47); Chantal van Landeghem (53.76); Julia Wilkinson (54.45)	3:38.42	
7	1	Japan	Haruka Ueda (54.98); Yayoi Matsumoto (54.00); Hanae Ito (54.94); Natsuki Hasegawa (55.63)	3:39.55	
8	8	Denmark	Pernille Blume (54.63); Mie Nielsen (55.23); Jeanette Ottesen (53.76); Lotte Friis (56.12)	3:39.74	
