= Swimming at the 2010 Commonwealth Games – Women's 4 × 100 metre freestyle relay =

Commonwealth Games

The Women's 4 × 100 metre freestyle relay event at the 2010 Commonwealth Games took place on 8 October 2010, at the SPM Swimming Pool Complex.

A final was held only, containing eight countries.

== Final ==
Rank	Lane	Names	Time	Notes
1	4	Australia; Alicia Coutts (54.17); Marieke Guehrer (54.08); Felicity Galvez (53.98); Emily Seebohm (54.13)	3:36.36	CGR
2	5	England; Amy Smith (55.26); Francesca Halsall (53.98); Emma Saunders (55.51); Jessica Sylvester (55.28)	3:40.03	
3	6	New Zealand; Hayley Palmer (55.11); Penelope Marshall (55.76); Amaka Gessler (55.79); Natasha Hind (55.46)	3:42.12	NR
4	2	Northern Ireland; Sycerika McMahon (57.46); Clare Dawson (58.26); Bethany Carson (57.06); Melanie Nocher (56.70)	3:49.48	
5	7	Scotland; Caitlin McClatchey (56.88); Sara Hamilton (57.53); Megan Gilchrist (58.66); Lucy Ellis (56.72)	3:49.79	
6	1	Malaysia; Kah Chan (58.47); Lai Chui (57.27); Chii Leung (58.70); Cai Khoo (1:00.39)	3:54.83	
7	8	India; Talasha Prabhu (59.96); Sneha Thirugnanasambandam (1:02.31); Surabhi Tipre (1:00.75); Jyotsna Pansare (59.53)	4:02.55	
8	3	Canada; Victoria Poon (55.34); Geneviève Saumur; Erica Morningstar; Julia Wilkinson		DSQ
