= Swimming at the 2010 Commonwealth Games – Women's 100 metre freestyle =

The Women's 100 metre freestyle event at the 2010 Commonwealth Games took place on 5 and 6 October 2010, at the SPM Swimming Pool Complex.

Six heats were held, with most containing the maximum number of swimmers (eight). The heat in which a swimmer competed did not formally matter for advancement, as the swimmers with the top sixteen times advanced to the semifinals and the top eight times from the semi-finals qualified for the finals.

== Heats ==
The Heats started on 9:00 local time.

=== Heat 1 ===
Rank	Lane	Name	Nationality	Time	Notes
1	4	Monica Bernardo	Mozambique	01:02.89	
2	5	Kathryn Millin	Swaziland	01:03.45	
3	3	Jessica Stagno	Mozambique	01:05.46	

=== Heat 2 ===
Rank	Lane	Name	Nationality	Time	Notes
1	4	Jade Howard	Zambia	01:01.05	
2	6	Mercedes Milner	Zambia	01:05.86	
3	3	Ajaykumar Hanika	Kenya	01:07.32	
4	7	Olivia Nakingi	Uganda	01:09.57	
5	2	Anham Salyani	Kenya	01:09.89	
6	1	Aminath Shahid	Maldives	01:13.62	
–	5	Magdalena Moshi	Tanzania		DNS

=== Heat 3 ===
Rank	Lane	Name	Nationality	Time	Notes
1	6	Shannon Austin	Seychelles	01:00.27	
2	4	Talasha Prabhu	India	01:00.41	
3	3	Cherelle Thompson	Trinidad and Tobago	01:00.46	
4	5	Jyotsna Pansare	India	01:01.42	
5	1	Judith Meauri	Papua New Guinea	01:02.50	
6	2	Olivia de Maroussem	Mauritius	01:03.10	
7	7	Elaine Reyes	Gibraltar	01:03.18	
8	8	Madhawee Kaluarachchilage	Sri Lanka	01:04.84	

=== Heat 4 ===
Rank	Lane	Name	Nationality	Time	Notes
1	5	Alicia Coutts	Australia	55.06	Q
2	4	Yolane Kukla	Australia	55.92	Q
3	6	Caitlin McClatchey	Scotland	56.45	Q
4	3	Erica Morningstar	Canada	56.51	Q
5	7	Georgia Holderness	Wales	57.51	Q
6	2	Clare Dawson	Northern Ireland	58.81	
7	1	Chii Leung	Malaysia	59.01	
8	8	Anna-Liza Mopio-Jane	Papua New Guinea	59.15	

=== Heat 5 ===
Rank	Lane	Name	Nationality	Time	Notes
1	4	Emily Seebohm	Australia	55.30	Q
2	5	Amy Smith	England	55.50	Q
3	6	Geneviève Saumur	Canada	56.00	Q
4	3	Natasha Hind	New Zealand	56.26	Q
5	2	Penelope Marshall	New Zealand	56.44	Q
6	7	Anna Stylianou	Cyprus	57.61	Q
7	1	Kah Chan	Malaysia	58.36	
8	8	Sian Morgan	Wales	58.63	

=== Heat 6 ===
Rank	Lane	Name	Nationality	Time	Notes
1	3	Hayley Palmer	New Zealand	55.09	Q
2	4	Francesca Halsall	England	55.58	Q
3	5	Victoria Poon	Canada	55.61	Q
4	2	Emma Saunders	England	56.13	Q
5	7	Sara Hamilton	Scotland	57.62	Q
6	6	Lucy Ellis	Scotland	57.64	
7	1	Lai Chui	Malaysia	57.84	
8	8	Bethany Carson	Northern Ireland	58.98	

== Semifinals ==
=== Semifinal 1 ===
Rank	Lane	Name	Nationality	Time	Notes
1	3	Victoria Poon	Canada	54.80	Q
2	4	Hayley Palmer	New Zealand	55.15	Q
3	5	Amy Smith	England	55.18	Q
4	2	Natasha Hind	New Zealand	55.24	Q
5	6	Geneviève Saumur	Canada	55.86	
6	7	Caitlin McClatchey	Scotland	56.36	
7	1	Georgia Holderness	Wales	57.19	
8	8	Sara Hamilton	Scotland	58.12	

=== Semifinal 2 ===
Rank	Lane	Name	Nationality	Time	Notes
1	4	Alicia Coutts	Australia	54.62	Q
2	3	Francesca Halsall	England	55.10	Q
3	5	Emily Seebohm	Australia	55.39	Q
4	2	Emma Saunders	England	55.85	Q
5	6	Yolane Kukla	Australia	55.96	
6	7	Penelope Marshall	New Zealand	56.26	
7	1	Erica Morningstar	Canada	56.44	
8	8	Anna Stylianou	Cyprus	57.06	

== Final ==
Rank	Lane	Name	Nationality	Time	Notes
1st place, gold medalist(s)	4	Alicia Coutts	Australia	54.09	
2nd place, silver medalist(s)	1	Emily Seebohm	Australia	54.30	
3rd place, bronze medalist(s)	3	Francesca Halsall	England	54.57	
4	6	Hayley Palmer	New Zealand	54.68	
5	2	Amy Smith	England	54.91	
6	5	Victoria Poon	Canada	55.04	
7	7	Natasha Hind	New Zealand	55.44	
8	8	Emma Saunders	England	56.17	

== See also ==
- 2010 Commonwealth Games
- Swimming at the 2010 Commonwealth Games
