= New Zealand at the 2011 World Aquatics Championships =

Sporting event delegation

Flag of New Zealand

New Zealand competed at the 2011 World Aquatics Championships in Shanghai, China between July 16 and 31, 2011.

== Open water swimming ==
Men

Athlete	Event	Final	
Athlete	Event	Time	Position
Kane Radford	Men's 5km	56:45.7	27

Women

Athlete	Event	Final	
Athlete	Event	Time	Position
Cara Baker	Women's 5km	1:00:47.3	9
Cara Baker	Women's 10km	2:02:34.0	22

== Swimming ==
New Zealand qualified 12 swimmers.

Men

Athlete	Event	Heats		Semifinals		Final	
Athlete	Event	Time	Rank	Time	Rank	Time	Rank
Matthew Stanley	Men's 200m Freestyle	1:48.93	23	did not advance			
Dylan Dunlop-Barrett	Men's 400m Freestyle	3:56.04	30			did not advance	
Dylan Dunlop-Barrett	Men's 800m Freestyle	8:13.06	34			did not advance	
Gareth Kean	Men's 100m Backstroke	53.89	7 Q	53.69	8 Q	53.50	8
Gareth Kean	Men's 200m Backstroke	2:00.74	24	did not advance			
Daniel Bell	Men's 50m Backstroke	25.91	22	did not advance			
Daniel Bell	Men's 100m Backstroke	54.75	23	did not advance			
Daniel Bell	Men's 50m Butterfly	24.43	30	did not advance			
Glenn Snyders	Men's 50m Breaststroke	27.52	6 Q	27.64	9	did not advance	
Glenn Snyders	Men's 100m Breaststroke	59.94	2 Q	1:00.59	13	did not advance	
Glenn Snyders	Men's 200m Breaststroke	2:12.38	10 Q	2:11.68	10	did not advance	

Women

Athlete	Event	Heats		Semifinals		Final	
Athlete	Event	Time	Rank	Time	Rank	Time	Rank
Natasha Hind	Women's 100m Freestyle	55.72	28	did not advance			
Lauren Boyle	Women's 200m Freestyle	1:57.72	8 Q	1:58.09	12	did not advance	
Lauren Boyle	Women's 400m Freestyle	4:05.86	3 Q			4:06.11	6
Lauren Boyle	Women's 800m Freestyle	8:28.50	7 Q			8:32.72	8
Sophia Batchelor	Women's 50m Backstroke	29.90	41	did not advance			
Sophia Batchelor	Women's 100m Butterfly	1:01.92	39	did not advance			
Sophia Batchelor	Women's 200m Backstroke	2:17.06	32	did not advance			
Melissa Ingram	Women's 100m Backstroke	1:01.48	17	did not advance			
Melissa Ingram	Women's 200m Backstroke	2:10.59	14 Q	2:10.77	15	did not advance	
Hayley Palmer	Women's 50m Butterfly	DNS		did not advance			
Natasha Hind; Amaka Gessler; Sophia Batchelor; Penelope May Marshall	Women's 4 × 100 m Freestyle Relay	3:44.99	14			did not advance	
Lauren Boyle; Amaka Gessler; Penelope May Marshall; Natasha Hind	Women's 4 × 200 m Freestyle Relay	7:57.15	8 Q			7:56.55	8

== Synchronised swimming ==
New Zealand has qualified 2 athletes in synchronised swimming.

Women

Athlete	Event	Preliminary		Final	
Athlete	Event	Points	Rank	Points	Rank
Kirstin Anderson	Solo Technical Routine	68.800	29	did not advance	
Kirstin Anderson	Solo Free Routine	69.530	25	did not advance	
Caitlin Anderson; Kirstin Anderson	Duet Technical Routine	67.600	38	did not advance	
Caitlin Anderson; Kirstin Anderson	Duet Free Routine	72.630	34	did not advance	

== Water polo ==
=== Women ===
Team Roster

- Carina Harache
- Emily Laura Cox – Captain
- Kelly Fiona Mason
- Danielle Marie Lewis
- Amy Bettina Logan
- Alexandra Rose Boyd
- Ashley Elizabeth Smallfield
- Lauren Jane Sieprath
- Johanna Helena Theelen
- Casie Lauren Bowry
- Kirsten Patricia Hudson
- Alexandra Jasmine Myles
- Brook Ali Millar

==== Group B ====
Team	Pld	W	D	L	GF	GA	GD	Pts
Canada	3	3	0	0	43	17	+26	6
Australia	3	2	0	1	46	16	+30	4
New Zealand	3	1	0	2	27	29	−2	2
Uzbekistan	3	0	0	3	14	68	−54	0

July 17, 2011; 13:30	Report	New Zealand	19–6	Uzbekistan	Shanghai Oriental Sports Center, Shanghai; Attendance: 450; Referees: Pinker (RSA); Borrell (ESP)
July 17, 2011; 13:30	Report	Score by quarters: 4–2, 5–1, 6–1, 4–2			Shanghai Oriental Sports Center, Shanghai; Attendance: 450; Referees: Pinker (RSA); Borrell (ESP)
July 17, 2011; 13:30	Report	Hudson 6	Goals	Halikova 3	Shanghai Oriental Sports Center, Shanghai; Attendance: 450; Referees: Pinker (RSA); Borrell (ESP)

July 19, 2011; 10:50	Report	Australia	12–4	New Zealand	Shanghai Oriental Sports Center, Shanghai; Attendance: 450; Referees: Ni (CHN), Pinker (RSA)
July 19, 2011; 10:50	Report	Score by quarters: 3–0, 2–0, 4–2, 3–2			Shanghai Oriental Sports Center, Shanghai; Attendance: 450; Referees: Ni (CHN), Pinker (RSA)
July 19, 2011; 10:50	Report	Ralph 3	Goals	Mason 2	Shanghai Oriental Sports Center, Shanghai; Attendance: 450; Referees: Ni (CHN), Pinker (RSA)

July 21, 2011; 19:40	Report	New Zealand	4–11	Canada	Shanghai Oriental Sports Center, Shanghai; Attendance: 500; Referees: Naumov (RUS), Alexandrescu (ROU)
July 21, 2011; 19:40	Report	Score by quarters: 2–3, 1–4, 1–2, 0–2			Shanghai Oriental Sports Center, Shanghai; Attendance: 500; Referees: Naumov (RUS), Alexandrescu (ROU)
July 21, 2011; 19:40	Report	four players 1	Goals	Csikos 4	Shanghai Oriental Sports Center, Shanghai; Attendance: 500; Referees: Naumov (RUS), Alexandrescu (ROU)

==== Playoff round ====
July 23, 2011; 12:10	Report	Netherlands	14–6	New Zealand	Shanghai Oriental Sports Center, Shanghai; Attendance: 350; Referees: Balfanbayev (KAZ), Cabral (BRA)
July 23, 2011; 12:10	Report	Score by quarters: 6–2, 2–0, 3–3, 3–1			Shanghai Oriental Sports Center, Shanghai; Attendance: 350; Referees: Balfanbayev (KAZ), Cabral (BRA)
July 23, 2011; 12:10	Report	Cabout, van Belkum 3	Goals	Mason, Shieprath 2	Shanghai Oriental Sports Center, Shanghai; Attendance: 350; Referees: Balfanbayev (KAZ), Cabral (BRA)

==== Classification 9–12 ====
July 25, 2011; 11:20	Report	New Zealand	10–11	Cuba	Shanghai Oriental Sports Center, Shanghai; Attendance: 300; Referees: Ni (CHN), Pinker (RSA)
July 25, 2011; 11:20	Report	Score by quarters: 2–3, 4–3, 3–2, 1–3			Shanghai Oriental Sports Center, Shanghai; Attendance: 300; Referees: Ni (CHN), Pinker (RSA)
July 25, 2011; 11:20	Report	Bowry 3	Goals	Gutierrez More 5	Shanghai Oriental Sports Center, Shanghai; Attendance: 300; Referees: Ni (CHN), Pinker (RSA)

==== Eleventh place game ====
July 27, 2011; 09:30	Report	New Zealand	7–15	Spain	Shanghai Oriental Sports Center, Shanghai; Attendance: 250; Referees: Deslieres (CAN), Cabral (BRA)
July 27, 2011; 09:30	Report	Score by quarters: 2–3, 1–6, 2–4, 2–2			Shanghai Oriental Sports Center, Shanghai; Attendance: 250; Referees: Deslieres (CAN), Cabral (BRA)
July 27, 2011; 09:30	Report	Mason, Sieprath 2	Goals	Gil Sorli 7	Shanghai Oriental Sports Center, Shanghai; Attendance: 250; Referees: Deslieres (CAN), Cabral (BRA)
