= Swimming at the 2010 Commonwealth Games – Women's 50 metre freestyle =

Women's 50 metre freestyle at the 2010 Commonwealth Games
- Venue: SPM Swimming Pool Complex
- Dates: 7 October (heats, semifinals); 8 October (final)
- Competitors: 47 from 26 nations
- Winning time: 24.86

Medalists
gold medal	Yolane Kukla	Australia
silver medal	Francesca Halsall	England
bronze medal	Hayley Palmer	New Zealand

The Women's 50 metre freestyle event at the 2010 Commonwealth Games took place on October 7 and 8 2010, at the SPM Swimming Pool Complex.

Six heats were held, with most containing the maximum number of swimmers (eight). The top sixteen advanced to the semifinals and the top eight from there qualified for the finals.

== Heats summary ==
Rank	Heat	Lane	Name	Nationality	Time	Notes
1	4	4	Francesca Halsall	England	25.05	Q
2	6	4	Yolane Kukla	Australia	25.47	Q
3	6	5	Marieke Guehrer	Australia	25.55	Q
4	4	5	Hayley Palmer	New Zealand	25.58	Q
5	5	4	Victoria Poon	Canada	25.60	Q
6	6	3	Amy Smith	England	25.67	Q
7	5	5	Alice Mills	Australia	25.73	Q
8	6	6	Lai Chui	Malaysia	26.38	Q
9	5	3	Amaka Gessler	New Zealand	26.40	Q
10	6	2	Lucy Ellis	Scotland	26.63	Q
11	4	6	Cherelle Thompson	Trinidad and Tobago	26.65	Q
12	5	6	Jessica Sylvester	England	26.74	Q
13	4	3	Sara Hamilton	Scotland	26.80	Q
14	4	2	Georgia Holderness	Wales	27.01	Q
15	5	2	Chii Leung	Malaysia	27.15	Q
16	6	7	Anna-Liza Mopio-Jane	Papua New Guinea	27.30	Q
17	5	7	Kah Chan	Malaysia	27.35	
18	4	7	Talasha Prabhu	India	27.68	
19	6	1	Sian Morgan	Wales	27.72	
20	3	7	Jade Howard	Zambia	27.97	
21	1	1	Sneha Thirugnanasambandam	India	28.14	
22	5	1	Sylvia Brunlehner	Kenya	28.16	
23	5	8	Shannon Austin	Seychelles	28.38	
24	1	2	Monica Bernardo	Mozambique	28.51	
25	4	8	Kathryn Millin	Swaziland	28.52	
26	4	1	Olivia De Maroussem	Mauritius	28.54	
27	6	8	Siona Huxley	Saint Lucia	28.97	
28	3	4	Judith Meauri	Papua New Guinea	28.98	
29	3	6	Elaine Reyes	Gibraltar	29.46	
30	2	4	Don Kaluarachchilage	Sri Lanka	29.55	
31	3	1	Mercedes Milner	Zambia	29.70	
32	2	5	W Lihini Tashia	Sri Lanka	29.96	
33	3	5	Mariam Foum	Tanzania	30.42	
34	2	8	Kristie Millar	Malawi	30.45	
35	2	6	Doli Akhter	Bangladesh	30.46	
36	2	2	Rachel Fortunato	Gibraltar	30.52	
36	3	2	Jamila Lunkuse	Uganda	30.52	
38	3	8	Magdalena Moshi	Tanzania	30.58	
39	3	3	Ajaykumar Hanika	Kenya	30.62	
40	2	5	Aishath Abdulla	Maldives	31.17	
41	2	1	Zahra Pinto	Malawi	31.21	
42	2	7	Olivia Nakiingi	Uganda	31.39	
43	1	4	Anham Salyani	Kenya	31.77	
44	1	3	Ammara Pinto	Malawi	32.24	
45	1	7	Karin O'Reilly Clashing	Antigua and Barbuda	32.50	
46	1	5	Aminath Shahid	Maldives	33.22	
47	1	6	Alphonsine Agahozo	Rwanda	33.81	

== Semifinals ==
=== Semifinal 1 ===
Rank	Lane	Name	Nationality	Time	Notes
1	4	Yolane Kukla	Australia	25.02	Q
2	5	Hayley Palmer	New Zealand	25.11	Q
3	3	Amy Smith	England	25.49	Q
4	6	Lai Chui	Malaysia	26.03	Q
5	7	Jessica Sylvester	England	26.31	
6	1	Georgia Holderness	Wales	26.62	
7	2	Lucy Ellis	Scotland	26.77	
8	8	Anna-Liza Mopio-Jane	Papua New Guinea	26.92	

=== Semifinal 2 ===
Rank	Lane	Name	Nationality	Time	Notes
1	4	Francesca Halsall	England	25.18	Q
2	3	Victoria Poon	Canada	25.26	Q
3	5	Marieke Guehrer	Australia	25.35	Q
4	6	Alice Mills	Australia	25.63	Q
5	2	Amaka Gessler	New Zealand	26.31	
6	7	Cherelle Thompson	Trinidad and Tobago	26.70	
7	1	Sara Hamilton	Scotland	26.83	
8	8	Chii Leung	Malaysia	27.13	

== Final ==
Rank	Lane	Name	Nationality	Time	Notes
1st place, gold medalist(s)	4	Yolane Kukla	Australia	24.86	
2nd place, silver medalist(s)	3	Francesca Halsall	England	24.98	
3rd place, bronze medalist(s)	5	Hayley Palmer	New Zealand	25.01	
4	6	Victoria Poon	Canada	25.13	
5	2	Marieke Guehrer	Australia	25.26	
6	1	Alice Mills	Australia	25.50	
7	7	Amy Smith	England	25.74	
8	8	Lai Chui	Malaysia	26.05	
