= New Zealand at the 2010 Commonwealth Games =

- CG code: NZL
- CGA: New Zealand Olympic Committee
- Website: www.olympic.org.nz

in Delhi, India
- Competitors: 191
- Flag bearers: Opening: Irene van Dyk; Closing: Joelle King
- Medals Ranked 11th: Gold 6 Silver 22 Bronze 8 Total 36

Commonwealth Games appearances (overview)
- 1930; 1934; 1938; 1950; 1954; 1958; 1962; 1966; 1970; 1974; 1978; 1982; 1986; 1990; 1994; 1998; 2002; 2006; 2010; 2014; 2018; 2022; 2026; 2030

New Zealand competed in the 2010 Commonwealth Games held in Delhi, India, from 3 to 14 October 2010.

== Medal tables ==
Medal	Name	Sport	Event	Date
Gold	Alison Shanks	Cycling – track	Women's individual pursuit	8 October
Gold	Valerie Adams	Athletics	Women's shot put	9 October
Gold	New Zealand Sevens men: DJ Forbes; Kurt Baker; Hosea Gear; Tomasi Cama; Liam Messam; Tim Mikkelson; Ben Smith; Lote Raikabula; Ben Souness; Toby Arnold; Sherwin Stowers; Zac Guildford	Rugby sevens	Men's tournament	12 October
Gold	Jaclyn Hawkes; Joelle King	Squash	Women's doubles	13 October
Gold	Mike Collings; John Snowden	Shooting	Full-bore rifle	13 October
Gold	Silver Ferns: Liana Leota; Leana de Bruin; Temepara George; Katrina Grant; Joline Henry; Laura Langman; Grace Rasmussen; Anna Scarlett; Maria Tutaia; Irene Van Dyk; Casey Williams; Daneka Wipiiti	Netball	Tournament	14 October
Silver	Jesse Sergent	Cycling – track	Men's individual pursuit	5 October
Silver	Lauren Ellis	Cycling – track	Women's 25 km points race	6 October
Silver	Gareth Kean	Swimming	Men's 200 m backstroke	6 October
Silver	Lauren Boyle; Penelope Marshall; Amaka Gessler; Natasha Hind	Swimming	Women's 4 × 200 m freestyle relay	6 October
Silver	Jess Hamill	Athletics	Women's shot put F32-34/52/53	6 October
Silver	Jo Kiesanowski	Cycling – track	Women's Scratch Race	7 October
Silver	Sam Bewley; Westley Gough; Marc Ryan; Jesse Sergent	Cycling – track	Men's team pursuit	7 October
Silver	Eddie Dawkins; Ethan Mitchell; Sam Webster	Cycling – track	Men's team sprint	8 October
Silver	Glenn Snyders	Swimming	Men's 50 m breaststroke	8 October
Silver	Daniel Bell	Swimming	Men's 100 m backstroke	8 October
Silver	Nikki Hamblin	Athletics	Women's 1500 m	8 October
Silver	Brent Newdick	Athletics	Men's decathlon	8 October
Silver	Richard Patterson	Weightlifting	Men's 85 kg	8 October
Silver	Alan Earle; Greg Yelavich	Shooting	Men's pairs 25 m centrefire pistol	9 October
Silver	Hayden Roulston	Cycling – road	Men's road race	10 October
Silver	Stanislav Chalaev	Weightlifting	Men's −105 kg	10 October
Silver	Nikki Hamblin	Athletics	Women's 800 m	11 October
Silver	Stuart Farquhar	Athletics	Men's javelin throw	12 October
Silver	Linda Villumsen	Cycling – road	Women's time trial	13 October
Silver	Black Sticks Women: Kayla Sharland; Emily Naylor; Krystal Forgesson; Katie Glynn; Stacey Carr; Ella Gunson; Beth Jurgeleit; Clarissa Eshuis; Lucy Talbot; Samantha Harrison; Gemma Flynn; Anna Thorpe; Natasha Fitzsimons; Charlotte Harrison; Stacey Michelsen; Anita Punt	Hockey	Women's tournament	13 October
Silver	Joelle King; Martin Knight	Squash	Mixed doubles	13 October
Silver	Val Smith	Lawn bowls	Women's singles	13 October
Bronze	Eddie Dawkins	Cycling – track	Men's 1000 m time trial	5 October
Bronze	Simon van Velthooven	Cycling – track	Men's keirin	6 October
Bronze	Sam Webster	Cycling – track	Men's sprint	7 October
Bronze	Hayley Palmer	Swimming	Women's 50 m freestyle	8 October
Bronze	Hayley Palmer; Penelope Marshall; Amaka Gessler; Natasha Hind	Swimming	Women's 4 × 100 m freestyle relay	8 October
Bronze	Andrea Miller	Athletics	Women's 100 m hurdles	11 October
Bronze	Nick Willis	Athletics	Men's 1500 m	12 October
Bronze	Black Sticks Men: Phil Burrows; Simon Child; Dean Couzins; Steve Edwards; Nick Haig; Andrew Hayward; Blair Hilton; Hugo Inglis; Stephen Jenness; Shea McAleese; Arun Panchia; Kyle Pontifex; Bradley Shaw; Hayden Shaw; Blair Tarrant; Nick Wilson	Hockey	Men's tournament	14 October

Medals by sport
Sport	Gold medal	Silver medal	Bronze medal	Total
Cycling	1	7	3	11
Athletics	1	5	2	8
Shooting	1	1	0	2
Squash	1	1	0	2
Netball	1	0	0	1
Rugby sevens	1	0	0	1
Swimming	0	4	2	6
Weightlifting	0	2	0	2
Hockey	0	1	1	2
Lawn bowls	0	1	0	1
Total	6	22	8	36

Medals by date
Date	Gold medal	Silver medal	Bronze medal	Total
5 October	0	1	1	2
6 October	0	4	1	5
7 October	0	2	1	3
8 October	1	6	2	9
9 October	1	1	0	2
10 October	0	2	0	2
11 October	0	1	1	2
12 October	1	1	1	2
13 October	2	4	0	6
14 October	1	0	1	2
Total	6	22	8	36

== Archery ==
New Zealand sent a team of three men and three women. They competed in the compound bow individual and team events.

=== Men ===
Event	Archer(s)	Qualification		Round of 64	Round of 32	Round of 16	Quarter Final	Semi Final	Final	Rank
Event	Archer(s)	Score	Seed	Opposition Result	Opposition Result	Opposition Result	Opposition Result	Opposition Result	Opposition Result	Rank
Compound Individual	Steve Clifton	702	3	Bye	(Norfolk Island) Snell (NFK); W 4–0	(Namibia) Grobler (NAM); L 2–4	Did Not Advance			-
Compound Individual	Shaun Teasdale	699	6	Bye	(Bangladesh) Mamun (BAN); W 4–0	(Canada) Schleppe (CAN); W 4–0	(Namibia) Grobler (NAM); W 6–0	(England) Busby (ENG); L 2–6	(South Africa) Cilliers (RSA); L 3–7	4
Compound Individual	Tony Waddick	694	15	Bye	(India) Srither (IND); W 4–3	(England) Busby (ENG); L 0–4	Did Not Advance			-
Compound Team	Steve Clifton; Shaun Teasdale; Tony Waddick	2095	3			(Cyprus) Cyprus; W 230–221	(India) India; L 225–226	Did Not Advance		-

=== Women ===
Event	Archer(s)	Qualification		Round of 32	Round of 16	Quarter Final	Semi Final	Final	Rank
Event	Archer(s)	Score	Seed	Opposition Result	Opposition Result	Opposition Result	Opposition Result	Opposition Result	Rank
Compound Individual	Stephanie Croskery	679	12	(India) Chanu (IND); W 4–0	(Scotland) McGowan (SCO); L 2–4	Did Not Advance			-
Compound Individual	Mandy McGregor	671	19	(England) Brown (ENG); L 0–4	Did Not Advance				-
Compound Individual	Anne Mitchell	655	29	(England) Simpson (ENG); W 4–0	(Australia) McCall (AUS); L 0–4	Did Not Advance			-
Compound Team	Stephanie Croskery; Mandy McGregor; Anne Mitchell	2005	7			(England) England; L 221–227	Did Not Advance		-

== Athletics ==
New Zealand sent a team of 12 track and field athletes.

=== Men ===
Track

Event	Athlete(s)	Heats		Round 2		Semi Finals		Final	
Event	Athlete(s)	Result	Rank	Result	Rank	Result	Rank	Result	Rank
1,500 m	Adrian Blincoe	3:41:54	5					3:44.47	10
1,500 m	Nick Willis	3:42:47	4					3:42:38	Bronze medal
5,000 m	Adrian Blincoe							14:03.1	11

Field – Throws

Event	Athlete(s)	Qualifying		Final	
Event	Athlete(s)	Result	Rank	Result	Rank
Javelin Throw	Stuart Farquhar			78.15	Silver medal

Combined

Event	Athlete(s)	100m	Long Jump	Shot Put	High Jump	400m	110m Hurdles	Discus	Pole Vault	Javelin	1,500m	Final	
Event	Athlete(s)	100m	Long Jump	Shot Put	High Jump	400m	110m Hurdles	Discus	Pole Vault	Javelin	1,500m	Result	Rank
Decathlon	Brent Newdick	11.07; 845 pts	7.42; 915 pts	13.98; 727 pts	1.96; 767 pts	49.86; 821 pts	14.79; 875 pts	45.50; 736 pts	4.80; 849 pts	56.94; 692 pts	4:41.33; 672 pts	7899 pts	Silver medal

=== Women ===
Track

Event	Athlete(s)	Heats		Round 2		Semi Finals		Final	
Event	Athlete(s)	Result	Rank	Result	Rank	Result	Rank	Result	Rank
200 m	Monique Williams	23.61	1			23.63	2	23.71	6
800 m	Nikki Hamblin	2:02.82	3					2:00:05	Silver medal
1,500 m	Nikki Hamblin	4:09.80	3					4:05.97	Silver medal
100 m Hurdles	Andrea Miller	13.35	3					13.25	Bronze medal

Field – Throws

Event	Athlete(s)	Qualifying		Final	
Event	Athlete(s)	Result	Rank	Result	Rank
Discus Throw	Beatrice Faumuina			57.79	5
Shot Put	Valerie Adams			20.47	Gold medal
Shot Put F32-34/52/53	Jess Hamill			979 pts	Silver medal

Field – Jumps

Event	Athlete(s)	Qualifying		Final	
Event	Athlete(s)	Result	Rank	Result	Rank
High Jump	Elizabeth Lamb			1.78	=6

Combined

Event	Athlete(s)	100 m Hurdles	High Jump	Shot Put	200 m	Long Jump	Javelin Throw	800 m	Final	
Event	Athlete(s)	100 m Hurdles	High Jump	Shot Put	200 m	Long Jump	Javelin Throw	800 m	Result	Rank
Heptathlon	Rebecca Wardell	14.18; 953 pts	1.69; 842 pts	14.64; 837 pts	DNF	DNS	DNS	DNS	DNF; 2632 pts	11

== Cycling ==
=== Track ===
Men

Round not applicable
Qualified for next round
Does not qualify

Event	Cyclist(s)	Qualifying		Round 1	Repechage	Round 2	Semi Final	Final	Rank
Event	Cyclist(s)	Time	Rank	Opposition Result	Opposition Result	Opposition Result	Opposition Result	Opposition Result	Rank
Individual Pursuit	Sam Bewley	4:19.612	4 Q					Tue 5 October	4
Individual Pursuit	Jesse Sergent	4:16.751	2 Q					4:17.893	Silver medal
Individual Pursuit	Peter Latham	4:25.534	5						5
Team Pursuit	Sam Bewley; Westley Gough; Peter Latham; Jesse Sergent	4:03.443	2 Q					Overtaken	Silver medal
1000 m Time Trial	Eddie Dawkins							57.345	Bronze medal
1000 m Time Trial	Marc Ryan							55.795	7
1000 m Time Trial	Myron Simpson							56.738	4
Keirin	Simon Van Velthooven			2nd in Heat 3 Q		1st in Heat 1 Q		3rd	Bronze medal
Individual Sprint	Eddie Dawkins		Q	(Trinidad and Tobago) Njisane; W 2–0		(Australia) Sunderland; L 0–2	–	1st–4th Place; 4th	4
Individual Sprint	Sam Webster		Q	(Canada) Smith; W 2–0		(Australia) Perkins; L 0–2	–	1st–4th Place; 3rd	Bronze medal
40 km Points Race	Shane Archbold	7 pts	3 Q						
40 km Points Race	Aaron Gate	6 pts	8 Q					24 pts	5
40 km Points Race	Peter Latham	25 pts	3 Q					8 pts	9

Women

Event	Cyclist(s)	Qualifying		Round 1	Repechage	Round 2	Semi Final	Final	Rank
Event	Cyclist(s)	Time	Rank	Opposition Result	Opposition Result	Opposition Result	Opposition Result	Opposition Result	Rank
Individual Pursuit	Alison Shanks	3:32.114	1 Q					3:30.875	Gold medal
Individual Pursuit	Jaime Neilsen		4 Q					3:39.923	4
25 km Points Race	Rushlee Buchanan							9 pts	7
25 km Points Race	Lauren Ellis							40 pts	Silver medal
25 km Points Race	Joanne Kiesanowski							14 pts	6
Scratch Race	Rushlee Buchanan							7th	7
Scratch Race	Joanne Kiesanowski							2nd	Silver medal
Scratch Race	Gemma Dudley							15th	15

==== Men's Track ====
- Shane Archbold
- Sam Bewley
- Eddie Dawkins
- Westley Gough
- Peter Latham
- Ethan Mitchell
- Marc Ryan
- Jesse Sergent
- Myron Simpson
- Simon Van Velthooven
- Sam Webster

==== Men's Road ====
- Jack Bauer
- Greg Henderson
- Gordon McCauley
- Hayden Roulston

==== Women's Track ====
- Kaytee Boyd
- Rushlee Buchanan
- Gemma Dudley
- Lauren Ellis
- Joanne Kiesanowski
- Jaime Nielsen
- Alison Shanks

==== Women's Road ====
- Catherine Cheatley
- Melissa Holt
- Linda Villumsen

== Diving ==
- Gabrielle Armstrong-Scott: 1m Springboard | 10m Platform

== Gymnastics ==
=== Artistic ===
Men

Event	Gymnast(s)	Qualification		Final	
Event	Gymnast(s)	Points	Rank	Points	Rank
Team Competition	Team New Zealand			243.8000	4
Individual All-Round	Misha Koudinov			83.000	6
Floor	Misha Koudinov			13.225	6
Floor	Patrick Peng			11.900	8
Parallel Bars	Mark Holyoake			13.825	4
Rings	Misha Koudinov			13.975	6
Vault	Patrick Peng			15.000	5

==== Men's Artistic ====
- Misha Koudinov
- Matthew Palmer
- Patrick Peng
- Mark Holyoake
- Brandon Field

==== Women's Artistic ====
- Holly Moon
- Lani Hohepa
- Jordan Rae
- Briana Mitchell

==== Rhythmic ====
- Keziah Oliver
- Kimberley Robson
- Mereana Rademekers

== Hockey ==
=== Men ===
New Zealand Squad:
Phil Burrows, Simon Child, Dean Couzins, Steve Edwards, Nick Haig, Andrew Hayward, Blair Hilton, Hugo Inglis, Stephen Jenness, Shea McAleese, Arun Panchia, Kyle Pontifex, Bradley Shaw, Hayden Shaw, Blair Tarrant, Nick Wilson.

Pool B

Team	Pts	Pld	W	D	L	GF	GA	GD
England	10	4	3	1	0	12	5	+7
New Zealand	7	4	2	1	1	15	9	+6
South Africa	6	4	2	0	2	12	10	+2
Canada	5	4	1	2	1	5	6	−1
Trinidad and Tobago	0	4	0	0	4	4	18	−14

5 October 2010
14:00

New Zealand	7–1	Trinidad and Tobago
Hayward 11' 47'; Inglis 20'; Hilton 30' 49'; Shaw 38'; Haig 65'	Report	Legerton 19'

Umpires:
Tim Pullman (AUS)
Haider Rasool (PAK)

6 October 2010
18:30

New Zealand	4–2	South Africa
Shaw 8'; Burrows 9'; Jenness 16'; Wilson 31'	Report	Norris-Jones 15'; Reid-Ross 64'

Umpires:
Tim Pullman (AUS)
Martin Madden (SCO)

8 October 2010
15:30

South Africa	5–3	Trinidad and Tobago
Carr 5' 50'; Louw 17'; Reid-Ross 38'; Paton 70'	Report	Browne 10'; Legerton 31' 52'

Umpires:
John Hrytsak (CAN)
Satinder Kumar (IND)

10 October 2010
14:00

New Zealand	1–1	Canada
Shaw 68'	Report	Singh 19'

Umpires:
Andrew Kennedy (ENG)
Haider Rasool (PAK)

Semi-final

12 October 2010
11:00

Australia	6–2	New Zealand
Orchard 25' 70'; Turner 28' 67'; Wilson 31'; Abbott 43'	Report	Hilton 51'; Burrows 60'

Umpires:
Martin Madden (SCO)
Satinder Kumar (IND)

Bronze medal match

14 October 2010
09:00

New Zealand	3–3 (a.e.t.)	England
Couzins 8'; Haig 15'; Shaw 37'	Report	S. Mantell 25' 57' 61'
Penalties
Couzins (penalty shoot-out scored); Burrows (penalty shoot-out scored); Shaw (penalty shoot-out scored); Hayward (penalty shoot-out scored); McAleese (penalty shoot-out scored)	5–3	(penalty shoot-out scored) Smith; (penalty shoot-out scored) R. Mantell; (penalty shoot-out missed) Dixon; (penalty shoot-out scored) Jackson

Umpires:
Richmond Attipoe (GHA)
Satinder Kumar (IND)

=== Women ===
Black Sticks Squad:
Kayla Sharland, Emily Naylor, Krystal Forgesson, Katie Glynn, Stacey Carr, Ella Gunson, Beth Jurgeleit, Clarissa Eshuis, Lucy Talbot, Samantha Harrison, Gemma Flynn, Anna Thorpe, Natasha Fitzsimons, Charlotte Harrison, Stacey Michelsen, Anita Punt.

Pool B

Team	Pts	Pld	W	D	L	GF	GA	GD
New Zealand	12	4	4	0	0	17	1	+16
England	9	4	3	0	1	12	6	+6
Canada	3	4	1	0	3	6	11	−5
Malaysia	3	4	1	0	3	5	12	−7
Wales	3	4	1	0	3	4	12	−8

4 October 2010
10:30

New Zealand	5–1	Wales
Glynn 18'; Flynn 37'; Thorpe 51' 59'; Eshuis 68'	Report	Welsford 33'

Umpires:
Irene Presenqui (ARG)
Elena Eskina (RUS)

5 October 2010
16:00

New Zealand	5–0	Malaysia
Punt 33'; Sharland 35+'; Thorpe 42'; C. Harrison 45'; S. Harrison 60'	Report

Umpires:
Michelle Joubert (RSA)
Dino Willox (WAL)

8 October 2010
13:30

England	1–4	New Zealand
Ball 14'	Report	S. Harrison 25'; Glynn 35' 51' 54'

Umpires:
Michelle Joubert (RSA)
Irene Presenqui (ARG)

9 October 2010
16:30

New Zealand	3–1	Canada
Forgesson 36'; Michelsen 47'; Eshuis 69'	Report	Pendleton 41'

Umpires:
Frances Block (ENG)
Dino Willox (WAL)

Semi-final

11 October 2010
17:30

New Zealand	1–0	South Africa
Eshuis 53'	Report

Umpires:
Irene Presenqui (ARG)
Elena Eskina (RUS)

Gold medal match

13 October 2010
13:00

Australia	2–2 (a.e.t.)	New Zealand
Arrold 9'; Nelson 59'	Report	Harrison 48'; Eshuis 70'
Penalties
Nelson (penalty shoot-out scored); Rivers (penalty shoot-out scored); Blyth (penalty shoot-out missed); Eastham (penalty shoot-out scored); Arrold (penalty shoot-out scored)	4–2	(penalty shoot-out missed) Glynn; (penalty shoot-out missed) Forgesson; (penalty shoot-out scored) Michelsen; (penalty shoot-out scored) Sharland

Umpires:
Chieko Soma (JPN)
Frances Block (ENG)

== Netball ==
The Silver Ferns consist of 12 netball players.

Women

Liana Leota, Leana de Bruin, Temepara George, Katrina Grant, Joline Henry, Laura Langman, Grace Rasmussen, Anna Scarlett, Maria Tutaia, Irene Van Dyk, Casey Williams, Daneka Wipiiti

Pool B

Nation	Pld	W	D	L
New Zealand	5	5	0	0
England	3	2	0	1
South Africa	1	0	0	1
Cook Islands	1	0	0	1
Barbados	1	0	0	1
Papua New Guinea	1	0	0	1

4 October 2010; 11:30	New Zealand	102–21	Papua New Guinea	Thyagaraj Sports Complex

5 October 2010; 15:00	New Zealand	87–24	Cook Islands	Thyagaraj Sports Complex

7 October 2010; 09:30	New Zealand	47–41	England	Thyagaraj Sports Complex

8 October 2010; 11:30	New Zealand	70–29	South Africa	Thyagaraj Sports Complex

10 October 2010; 14:00	New Zealand	97–22	Barbados	Thyagaraj Sports Complex

== Rugby Sevens ==
Summary

Competitor(s)	Event	Rank
New Zealand	Men's Team	Gold medal

=== Group A ===
Team	Pld	W	D	L	PF	PA	PD	Pts
New Zealand	3	3	0	0	141	7	+134	9
Scotland	3	2	0	1	45	63	−18	7
Canada	3	1	0	2	71	62	9	5
Guyana	3	0	0	3	0	125	−125	3

Group Results

11 October 2010
9:44

New Zealand	43–7	Canada

Delhi University, New Delhi

11 October 2010
12:50

New Zealand	52–0	Guyana

Delhi University, New Delhi

11 October 2010
17:32

New Zealand	46–0	Scotland

Delhi University, New Delhi

Quarter Final

12 October 2010
11:00

New Zealand	31–10	Wales

Delhi University

Semi-final

12 October 2010
14:28

New Zealand	33–12	England

Delhi University

Gold Medal Match

12 October 2010
16:20

New Zealand	24–17	Australia

Delhi University Stadium, Delhi University

----

== Swimming ==
Men

Round not applicable
Qualified for next round
Does not qualify

Event	Swimmer(s)	Heats		Semi Finals		Final	
Event	Swimmer(s)	Result	Rank	Result	Rank	Result	Rank
50 m Backstroke	Daniel Bell	25.90	6 Q	25.44	5 Q	25.27	4
50 m Backstroke	Gareth Kean	25.80	3 Q	25.87	7 Q	25.89	8
100 m Backstroke	Daniel Bell	55.03	2 Q	54.38	3 Q		
100 m Backstroke	Gareth Kean	55.85	8 Q	55.26	6 Q		
200 m Backstroke	Daniel Bell	2:02.34	12			DNQ	
200 m Backstroke	Gareth Kean	2:00.86	8 Q			1:57.37	Silver medal
50 m Breaststroke	Glenn Snyders	28.15	1 Q	27.86	1= Q	27.67	Silver medal
100 m Breaststroke	Glenn Snyders	1:01.30	2 Q	1:00.55	3 Q	1:01.39	6
200 m Breaststroke	Glenn Snyders					2:14:42	8
50 m Butterfly	Daniel Bell	24.81	9 Q				
50 m Butterfly	Moss Burmester	25.13	11 Q	24.99	11	DNQ	
100 m Butterfly	Moss Burmester	54.69	9 Q	54.43	10		
200 m Butterfly	Moss Burmester	1:58.93	10			DNQ	

Women

Event	Swimmer(s)	Heats		Semi Finals		Final	
Event	Swimmer(s)	Result	Rank	Result	Rank	Result	Rank
50 m Backstroke	Emily Thomas	29.17	6 Q	28.85	7 Q		
100 m Backstroke	Emily Thomas	1:01.77	10 Q	1:01.58	11		
100 m Backstroke	Melissa Ingram	1:01.51	5 Q	1:00.92	5 Q	1:01.14	7
200 m Backstroke	Melissa Ingram						
200 m Backstroke	Penelope Marshall						
100 m Breaststroke	Natalie Wiegersma						
50 m Butterfly	Hayley Palmer	27.16	7 Q	27.14	8=	DNQ	
100 m Butterfly	Natalie Wiegersma	1:01.17	13 Q	1:00.08	11	DNQ	
50 m Freestyle	Amaka Gessler	26.40	9 Q	26.31	10=	DNQ	
50 m Freestyle	Hayley Palmer	25.58	4 Q	25.11	2 Q	25.01	Bronze medal
100 m Freestyle	Natasha Hind	56.26	10 Q	55.24	6 Q	55.44	7
100 m Freestyle	Penelope Marshall	56.44	11 Q	56.26	11	DNQ	
100 m Freestyle	Hayley Palmer	55.09	2 Q	55.15	4 Q	54.68	4
200 m Freestyle	Lauren Boyle	1:59.33	3 Q			1:58.96	7
200 m Freestyle	Natasha Hind	2:00.35	9			DNQ	
200 m Freestyle	Penelope Marshall	2:01.35	11			DNQ	
400 m Freestyle	Lauren Boyle						
4 × 100 m Freestyle Relay	Hayley Palmer; Penelope Marshall; Amaka Gessler; Natasha Hind					Hayley Palmer; Penelope Marshall; Amaka Gessler; Natasha Hind	Bronze medal
4 × 200 m Freestyle Relay	Lauren Boyle; Penelope Marshall; Amaka Gessler; Natasha Hind					Lauren Boyle; Penelope Marshall; Amaka Gessler; Natasha Hind; 7:57.46	Silver medal
200 m Individual Medley	Natalie Wiegersma						
400 m Individual Medley	Natalie Wiegersma	2:15.45	5 Q			2:12.12	4

== Weightlifting ==
Men

Event	Athlete	Weights Lifted		Total Lifted	Rank
Event	Athlete	Snatch	Clean & Jerk	Total Lifted	Rank
85 kg	Richard Patterson	150 kg	181 kg	331 kg	Silver medal

== See also ==
- 2010 Commonwealth Games
