= Lisa Vitting =

German swimmer (born 1991)

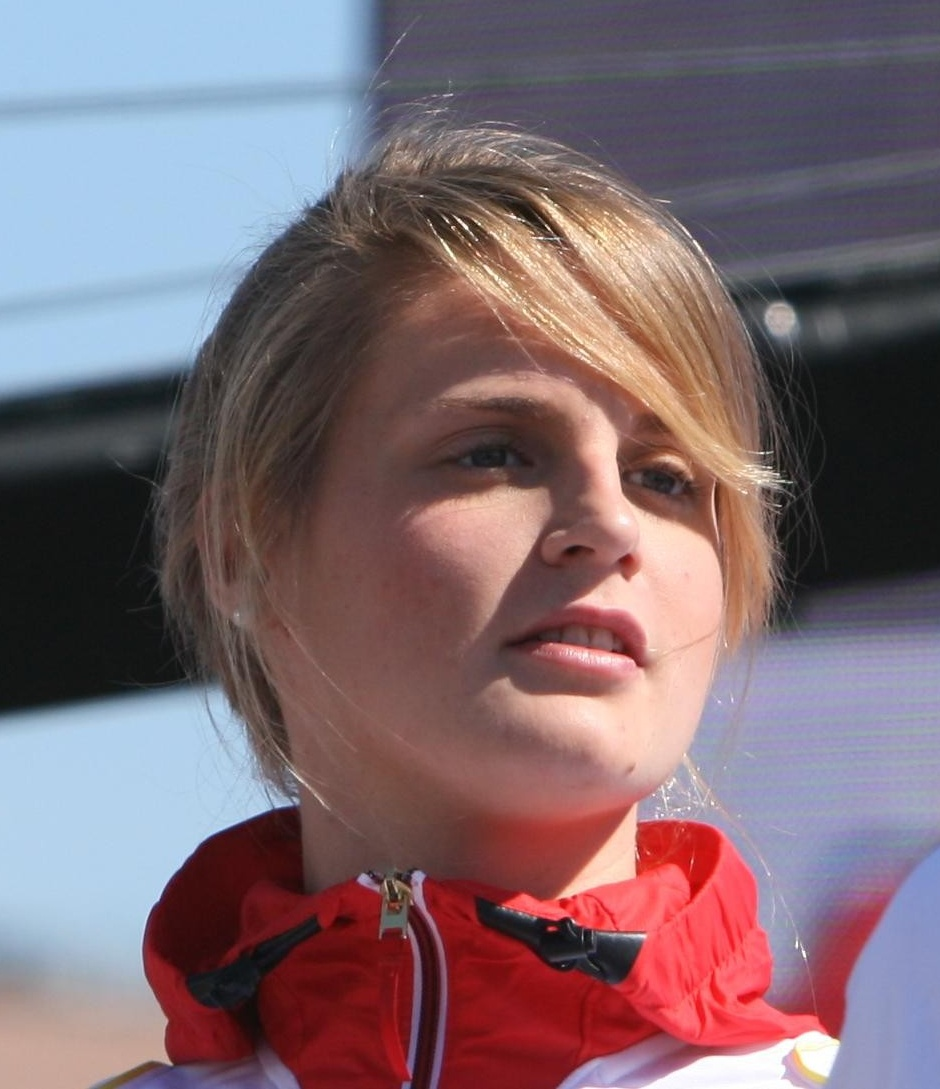
- Vitting in 2012

Personal information
- Nationality: Germany
- Born: 9 July 1991 (age 35) Moers, Germany
- Height: 1.85 m (6 ft 1 in)
- Weight: 74 kg (163 lb)

Sport
- Sport: Swimming
- Strokes: Freestyle
- Club: SG Essen
Medal record
World Championships (LC)
Bronze medal – third place	2011 Shanghai	4×100 m freestyle
European Championships (LC)
Gold medal – first place	2010 Budapest	4×100 m freestyle
Gold medal – first place	2012 Debrecen	4×100 m freestyle
European Championships (SC)
Silver medal – second place	2010 Eindhoven	4×50 m freestyle
Silver medal – second place	2010 Eindhoven	4×50 m medley
Bronze medal – third place	2008 Rijeka	4×50 m freestyle
Bronze medal – third place	2009 Istanbul	4×50 m freestyle
Youth World Championships
Silver medal – second place	2008 Monterrey	4×100 m freestyle
European Junior Championships
Gold medal – first place	2007 Antwerp	4×100 m freestyle
Silver medal – second place	2006 Palma de Mallorca	4×100 m freestyle
Silver medal – second place	2007 Antwerp	100 m freestyle

Lisa Vitting (born 9 July 1991) is a German swimmer.

Vitting was born in Moers, Germany.

She competed at the 2012 Summer Olympics in the 4 × 100 m freestyle relay and finished in ninth place.

She won two European titles in this event in 2010 and 2012 and a bronze medal at the world championships in Shanghai in 2011.
