= Wiegersma =

Wiegersma is a surname. Notable people with the surname include:

- Jelger Wiegersma (born 1981), Dutch Magic: The Gathering player
- Natalie Wiegersma (born 1990), New Zealand swimmer
