= Mark Holyoake =

New Zealand gymnast

- Born: 1 March 1983 (age 43) Wellington, New Zealand

Gymnastics career
- Discipline: Men's artistic gymnastics
- Country represented: New Zealand
- Retired: 2010

Mark Holyoake (born 1 March 1983) is a New Zealand gymnast from Wellington. He was placed 25th at the 2005 World Artistic Gymnastics Championships and 11th at the 2006 Commonwealth Games. He was part of the New Zealand team that placed 4th at the 2010 Commonwealth Games and, also, he placed 4th on the parallel bars at the same event. In 2010, he retired and is now owner and head coach at Carbon Method Crossfit.

== Pommel horse world record ==
In 2009, Holyoake broke the record for the Most Rotations on a Pommel Horse in 60 seconds with 65.

== Education ==
Holyoake obtained a BSc Sport and Exercise Science degree from Auckland University.

== See also ==
- New Zealand at the 2010 Commonwealth Games
- Les Mills International
