= Heerden Herman =

South African swimmer (born 1990)

Personal information
- Born: 20 December 1990 (age 35) Pretoria, South Africa

Sport
- Sport: Swimming
Medal record
Representing South Africa
Commonwealth Games
Gold medal – first place	2010 Delhi	1500m freestyle
Bronze medal – third place	2010 Delhi	4x200m freestyle relay
World Junior Championships
Gold medal – first place	2008 Monterrey	800m freestyle

Heerden Herman (born 20 December 1990) is a South African former Olympic freestyle swimmer. He trained at the Maties Swimming Club in Stellenbosch with Pierre de Roubaix. The first time the swimming fraternity took note of him was at the Western Province Championships in December 2005, when, as a 14-year-old, he broke the 800-meter freestyle open record.

In 2008, Heerden participated in the FINA World Junior Swimming Championships in Monterrey, Mexico, where he won the gold in the 800-meter freestyle. At the 2010 Commonwealth Games in India, he won the silver medal in the 1500-meter freestyle, and as a member of the 4X200-meter freestyle relay team, they took the bronze.

At the Western Province Championships in December 2010, Heerden swam a time of 14:57.88 in the 1500 meter freestyle, breaking Ryk Neethling’s record and setting a new SA National Open record. With this swim he became the first South African, and the second swimmer from the African continent to finish the 1500m freestyle in less than 15 minutes. He ended the season being ranked number six in the world for the 1500-meter freestyle and under the top 20 in the world for both the 400m and 800m freestyle events.

Heerden was one of only a handful of swimmers to qualify for more than one event for the 2012 London Olympics – the 400 and 1500 meter freestyle events. Due to long-term illness, he did not perform to his best at the Olympics and decided to retire. Heerden completed his university studies at Stellenbosch University with distinction at the end of 2013 and was awarded the Rhodes Scholarship to study at Oxford University from 2014.

== See also ==
- List of Commonwealth Games medallists in swimming (men)
