= Alicia Coutts =

Australian swimmer (born 1987)

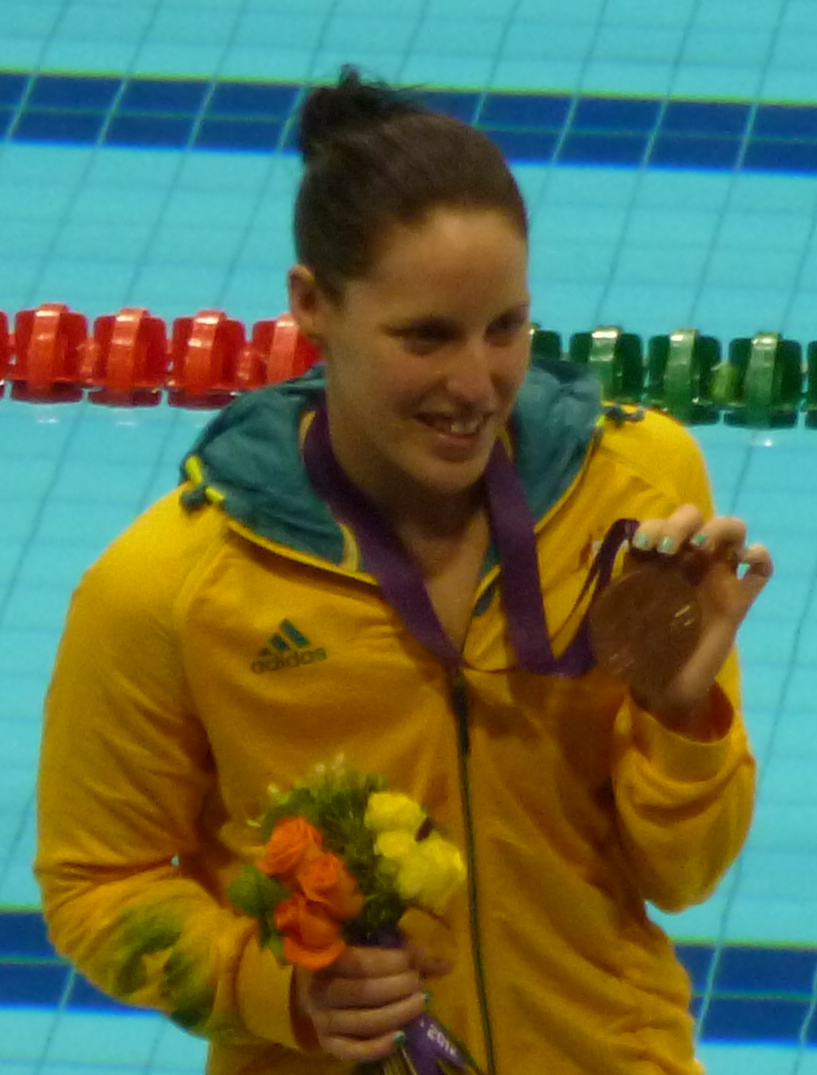
- Coutts at the 2012 Summer Olympics

Personal information
- Full name: Alicia Jayne Coutts
- Nicknames: "Couttsy", "Leshy"
- National team: Australia
- Born: 14 September 1987 (age 39) Brisbane, Queensland
- Height: 1.76 m (5 ft 9 in)
- Weight: 70 kg (154 lb)

Sport
- Sport: Swimming
- Strokes: Butterfly, freestyle, medley
- Club: Redlands Swim Club
- Coach: John Fowlie
Medal record
Event	1st	2nd	3rd
Olympic Games	1	3	1
World Championships (LC)	0	7	1
Pan Pacific Championships	2	3	1
Commonwealth Games	8	1	0
Total	11	14	3
Women's swimming
Representing Australia
Olympic Games
Gold medal – first place	2012 London	4×100 m freestyle
Silver medal – second place	2012 London	200 m medley
Silver medal – second place	2012 London	4×200 m freestyle
Silver medal – second place	2012 London	4×100 m medley
Bronze medal – third place	2012 London	100 m butterfly
World Championships (LC)
Silver medal – second place	2011 Shanghai	100 m butterfly
Silver medal – second place	2011 Shanghai	200 m medley
Silver medal – second place	2013 Barcelona	100 m butterfly
Silver medal – second place	2013 Barcelona	200 m medley
Silver medal – second place	2013 Barcelona	4×100 m freestyle
Silver medal – second place	2013 Barcelona	4×200 m freestyle
Silver medal – second place	2013 Barcelona	4×100 m medley
Bronze medal – third place	2011 Shanghai	4×100 m medley
Pan Pacific Championships
Gold medal – first place	2014 Gold Coast	100 m butterfly
Gold medal – first place	2014 Gold Coast	4×100 m medley
Silver medal – second place	2010 Irvine	4×100 m freestyle
Silver medal – second place	2010 Irvine	4×100 m medley
Silver medal – second place	2014 Gold Coast	200 m medley
Bronze medal – third place	2010 Irvine	100 m butterfly
Commonwealth Games
Gold medal – first place	2010 Delhi	100 m freestyle
Gold medal – first place	2010 Delhi	100 m butterfly
Gold medal – first place	2010 Delhi	200 m medley
Gold medal – first place	2010 Delhi	4×100 m freestyle
Gold medal – first place	2010 Delhi	4×100 m medley
Gold medal – first place	2014 Glasgow	4×100 m freestyle
Gold medal – first place	2014 Glasgow	4×200 m freestyle
Gold medal – first place	2014 Glasgow	4×100 m medley
Silver medal – second place	2014 Glasgow	200 m medley

Alicia Jayne Coutts, OAM (born 14 September 1987) is an Australian competitive medley, butterfly and freestyle swimmer. She represented Australia at the 2008 Summer Olympics, 2012 Summer Olympics and the 2010 Commonwealth Games (New Delhi). She was a Swimming Australia National Training Centre scholarship holder and was coached by John Fowlie. Her haul of five medals at the 2012 Summer Olympics matches fellow Australians Ian Thorpe and Shane Gould in one single Olympics, and trails only Emma McKeon’s seven.

== Early years ==
Coutts was born in Brisbane, Queensland. She attended St Matthews Primary School and Chisholm Catholic College.

== Career ==
=== 2008 Olympics ===
Coutts competed at the 2008 Summer Olympics where she ended up fifth in the 200-metre individual medley.

=== 2010 Commonwealth Games and Pan Pacs ===
At the Pan Pacs, she took two relay silver medals and bronze in the 100 m butterfly.

At the 2010 Commonwealth Games, she won the 100-metre butterfly, 100-metre freestyle, 200-metre individual medley, as well as contributing to the 4×100-metre freestyle relay and 4×100-metre medley relay, bringing her total haul to 5 gold medals. She carried the Australian flag at the Commonwealth Games closing ceremony. She was named the Telstra Australian Swimmer of the Year for 2010.

At the 2011 Australian Championships which doubled as the World Championship Trials, seeking to pick up her first national title. On night two, she doubled up, taking the 100-metre butterfly by a clear margin, as well as the 200-metre individual medley, beating Olympic champion Stephanie Rice by approximately an arm's length. She took 6th place in the 200-metre freestyle. On night six, she took gold in the 100-metre freestyle, winning by a clear margin over Yolane Kukla. In June, she took 3 gold at the Barcelona leg of the Mare Nostrum Series, downing the meet record of the 100-metre butterfly as well as the 200-metre individual medley in a personal best time.

=== 2011 World championships and Olympic Trials ===
At the 2011 World Championships on night two, Coutts took silver medals in the 100-metre butterfly and 200-metre individual medley. She swam the butterfly leg of the 4×100-metre medley relay, capturing a bronze medal.

At the 2012 Olympic Trials, she won the 100-metre butterfly holding off Jessicah Schipper down the stretch and stopping Libby Trickett's attempt to defend her Olympic title in that event. She took silver in the 200-metre medley, booking another individual spot. She later placed in the top 6 in the 100-metre freestyle, gaining a spot on the 4×100-metre freestyle relay. On the final night she collected silver in the 4×100-metre medley relay.

=== 2012 Olympics ===
On night one, she collected gold in the 4×100-metre freestyle relay with Cate Campbell, Brittany Elmslie and Melanie Schlanger setting a new Olympic record in the process. On night two, she collected a bronze in the 100-metre butterfly, she became the 8th fastest of all time. Night 4 she got a silver in the 200-metre individual medley becoming the 5th fastest of all time. On night 5, she anchored the 4×200-metre freestyle relay team to silver, recording a 200-metre split time of 1:56.12, 1.6 seconds quicker than her official personal best. On the final night, she collected a silver in the 4×100-metre medley relay, bringing her medal total to 5 in a single Olympic Games.

At the 2013 Australian Championships (which doubled as the qualifiers for 2013 World Aquatics Championships), Coutts won gold the 50 and 100-metre butterfly and the 200-metre individual medley, silver in the 50-metre backstroke and bronze in the 50-metre breastroke and 100-metre freestyle.

=== 2013 World Championships ===
At the World Championships, she collected silver medals in the 100-metre butterfly, 200-metre medley, 4x100-metre freestyle relay, 4×200-metre freestyle relay, 4×100-metre medley relay.

=== 2016 Olympics ===
At the 2016 Summer Olympics, Coutts finished fifth in the final of the 200 m individual medley. In October 2016, she announced her retirement.

== Career best times ==
Coutts holds one Olympic record in the 4×100-metre freestyle relay, the Commonwealth records in the short-course 100-metre butterfly, 100-metre and 200-metre individual medley, and two Commonwealth Games records and is the fastest Australian in textile in the 200-metre individual medley and 100-metre butterfly.

Long Course
Event	Time	Meet
50 m freestyle	24.95	2013 Australian Championships
100 m freestyle	53.78	2011 World Championships
200 m freestyle	1:57.72	2011 Australian Championships
100 m butterfly	56.85	2012 Olympics
200 m individual medley	2:08:15	2012 Olympics

Short Course
Event	Time	-	Meet
100 m freestyle	53.42		2013 Australian SC Championships
200 m freestyle	1:57.72		2010 Australian SC Championships
100 m butterfly	55.30	CR	2013 FINA Swimming World Cup
100 m individual medley	57.53	CR	2013 FINA Swimming World Cup
200 m individual medley	2:05.63	CR	2013 FINA Swimming World Cup

== Recognition ==
In 2012, she won the Australian Institute of Sport Athlete of the Year Award with sailor Tom Slingsby.

== See also ==
- List of Olympic medalists in swimming (women)
- List of World Aquatics Championships medalists in swimming (women)
- List of Commonwealth Games medallists in swimming (women)
- List of Australian records in swimming
- List of Commonwealth records in swimming

Awards
Preceded by Jessicah Schipper	Pacific Rim Swimmer of the Year; 2010	Succeeded by Ye Shiwen
Preceded by Anna Meares	Australian Athlete of the Year; 2012 (with Tom Slingsby)	Succeeded by Caroline Buchanan and Kim Crow
