= Fran Halsall =

British swimmer (born 1990)

Francesca Halsall
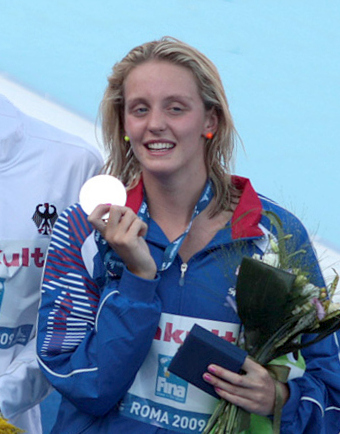
- Halsall with 100 m freestyle silver medal at 2009 world championships

Personal information
- Full name: Francesca Jean Halsall
- Nickname: "Fran"
- National team: Great Britain
- Born: 12 April 1990 (age 36) Southport, England
- Height: 1.71 m (5 ft 7 in)
- Weight: 59 kg (130 lb)
- Website: Francesca Halsall (archived)
- Spouse: Jon Wilkin (m. 2018)

Sport
- Sport: Swimming
- Strokes: Freestyle, butterfly
- Club: Loughborough University
- Coach: James Gibson
Medal record
Event	1st	2nd	3rd
World Championships (LC)	2	1	1
World Championships (SC)	0	3	3
European Championships	10	3	4
Commonwealth Games	3	7	1
Total	15	14	9
Women's swimming
Representing Great Britain
World Championships (LC)
Gold medal – first place	2015 Kazan	4×100 m mixed medley
Silver medal – second place	2009 Rome	100 m freestyle
Bronze medal – third place	2013 Barcelona	50 m freestyle
World Championships (SC)
Silver medal – second place	2008 Manchester	100 m freestyle
Silver medal – second place	2012 Istanbul	50 m freestyle
Silver medal – second place	2014 Doha	4×50 m medley
Bronze medal – third place	2008 Manchester	50 m freestyle
Bronze medal – third place	2008 Manchester	4×100 m freestyle
Bronze medal – third place	2008 Manchester	4×100 m medley
European Championships (LC)
Gold medal – first place	2006 Budapest	4×100 m medley
Gold medal – first place	2008 Eindhoven	4×100 m medley
Gold medal – first place	2010 Budapest	100 m freestyle
Gold medal – first place	2010 Budapest	4×100 m medley
Gold medal – first place	2014 Berlin	50 m freestyle
Gold medal – first place	2014 Berlin	50 m backstroke
Gold medal – first place	2014 Berlin	4×100 m mixed medley
Gold medal – first place	2016 London	50 m backstroke
Gold medal – first place	2016 London	4×100 m medley
Gold medal – first place	2016 London	4×100 m mixed medley
Silver medal – second place	2010 Budapest	100 m butterfly
Silver medal – second place	2010 Budapest	4×100 m freestyle
Silver medal – second place	2016 London	50 m freestyle
Bronze medal – third place	2010 Budapest	50 m freestyle
Bronze medal – third place	2014 Berlin	50 m butterfly
Bronze medal – third place	2014 Berlin	4×100 m medley
Bronze medal – third place	2016 London	50 m butterfly
Representing England
Commonwealth Games
Gold medal – first place	2010 Delhi	50 m butterfly
Gold medal – first place	2014 Glasgow	50 m butterfly
Gold medal – first place	2014 Glasgow	50 m freestyle
Silver medal – second place	2006 Melbourne	4×100 m freestyle
Silver medal – second place	2006 Melbourne	4×100 m medley
Silver medal – second place	2010 Delhi	50 m freestyle
Silver medal – second place	2010 Delhi	4×100 m freestyle
Silver medal – second place	2010 Delhi	4×100 m medley
Silver medal – second place	2014 Glasgow	4×100 m freestyle
Silver medal – second place	2014 Glasgow	4×100 m medley
Bronze medal – third place	2010 Delhi	100 m freestyle

Francesca Jean Halsall (born 12 April 1990) is a retired English competitive swimmer who has represented Great Britain at the Olympics, FINA world championships, and European championships, and England at the Commonwealth Games. She competed primarily in freestyle and butterfly events.

Halsall was the youngest member of the Team England swim squad at the 2006 Commonwealth Games in Melbourne, where she won silver medals in the 4×100-metre freestyle and 4×100-metre medley relays.

She was a member of the European Aquatics Championships 4×100-metre medley relay team that took gold in August 2006 and successfully defended their title in August 2008 in Eindhoven. Halsall won five medals at the 2010 European Championships in Budapest, 2 Golds, 2 Silvers and a Bronze and was a member of the 4x100-metre medley relay team that successfully defended their title for a second time. In winning five medals, she became the most successful British swimmer ever at a single championships.

At the 2010 Commonwealth Games in New Delhi, India, Halsall won a gold medal, with a national record of 26.19 seconds, in the 50-metre butterfly, beating the favoured Australians. In the 100-metre freestyle Halsall was expected to win easily but a bout of illness (Delhi Belly) left her pale and weak and she had to be content with the bronze medal. Just 20 minutes later and despite being almost unable to stand up she returned for the 100-metre butterfly semi finals but failed to make the final. Later in the Games Halsall recovered enough to win 3 more silver medals in the women's 50-metre freestyle and as part of the 4x100-metre freestyle and 4x100-metre medley relay teams.

== Personal life ==
Halsall was born in Southport and attended St Mary's College, Crosby.

In July 2017, Halsall was made an Honorary Doctor of Science (HonDSc) by Edge Hill University.

Halsall is married to rugby league star Jon Wilkin.

== Swimming career ==
=== 2008 FINA Short Course World Championships ===
Halsall won four medals at 2008 World Short Course Championships in Manchester, including 4×100 m freestyle bronze on her 18th birthday. She won the silver medal in the 100 m freestyle behind Marleen Veldhuis of the Netherlands.

=== 2008 Summer Olympics ===
Halsall represented Great Britain at the 2008 Summer Olympics in the 100 m butterfly, 50 m freestyle, 100 m freestyle, 4×100 m freestyle, 4×200 m freestyle and 4×100 m medley

In the 100 m freestyle final, she placed 8th, at 54.29. She swam a British record of 53.81 which helped the British quartet set a new national record of 3:38.18 in the 4×100 m freestyle.

=== 2009 FINA Long Course World Championships ===
Halsall competed in 4 events at the 2009 world championships in Rome. She set a championship record for the 100m freestyle in the lead-off leg during the heats, and in the finals swam the lead leg, with Great Britain placing 7th. Halsall placed 5th in the 50m freestyle in a national record of 24.11. In the 100m, she out-touched Lisbeth Trickett of Australia to take silver in a national record of 52.87, with Germany's Britta Steffen winning in a new world record of 52.07. Halsall anchored the 4x100 metre medley relay to 5th place.

=== 2012 Summer Olympics ===
At the 2012 Summer Olympics in London, Halsall competed in five events. Halsall reached the semi-finals of 100m butterfly, posting a time of 58.52, well off her season's best of 57.56 set in March. Halsall made the finals of the 100m freestyle and 50m freestyle, finishing 6th and 5th respectively. In the 4×100 m freestyle relay Halsall swam the second leg in a split of 53.29, helping the British team to a 5th-place finish. In the final of the 4×100 m medley relay the British team finished 8th, with Halsall providing an anchor leg of 54.08.

=== 2013 FINA Long Course World Championships ===
Having just missed out on a medal in the 50m butterfly by coming fourth, Halsall successfully gained bronze in the 50m freestyle posting a time of 24.30 seconds. This ended a disappointing drought of medals for Great Britain just one year after the London Olympics, though Halsall was the only swimmer to finish in a medal-winning position.

=== 2014 Commonwealth Games ===
At the 2014 Commonwealth Games, Halsall won gold in the 50 m freestyle, setting three new Commonwealth Games records along the way. She also won the 50 m butterfly in a Games record time. In the relay events, she helped England to win silver in the 4 × 100 m freestyle and the 4 × 100 m medley.

=== 2016 Olympics ===
Halsall competed for Great Britain at the 2016 Summer Olympics, narrowly missing out on a bronze medal in the 50 metres freestyle and helping the GB team to finish 7th in the 4 × 100 m freestyle.

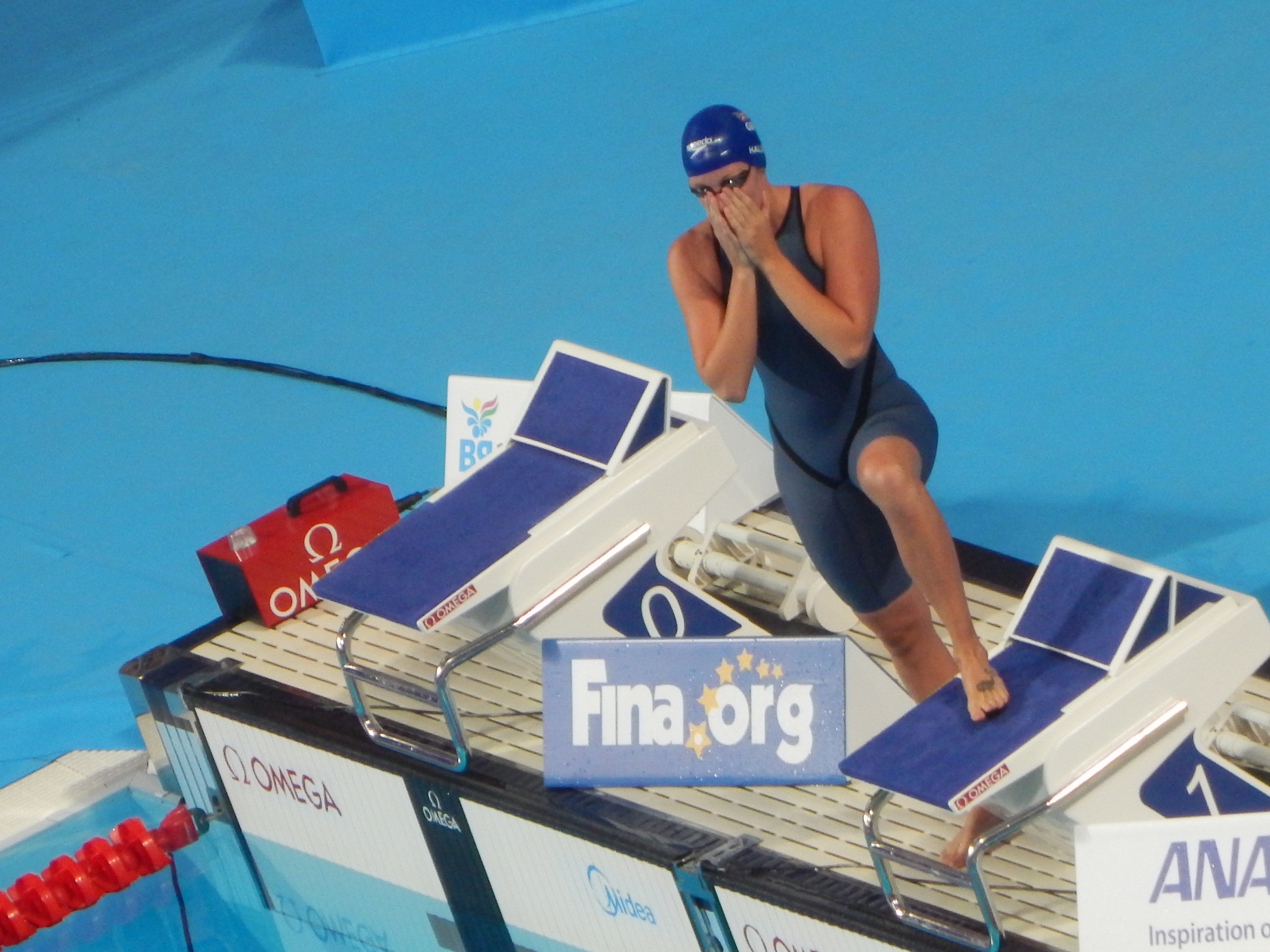
Kazan 2015

== Personal bests and records held ==
Event	Long course	Short course
50 m freestyle	23.96 (2014) ^{NR}	23.44 (2009) ^{NR}
100 m freestyle	52.87 (2009) ^{NR}	51.19 (2009) ^{NR}
200 m freestyle	1.59.13 (2008)	1.53.79 (2010) ^{NR}
50 m butterfly	25.20 (2014) ^{NR}	25.29 (2014) ^{NR}
100 m butterfly	57.40 (2010)	55.71 (2009) ^{NR}
100 m individual medley		58.55 (2009)
Record Key NR:British

== See also ==
- List of World Aquatics Championships medalists in swimming (women)
- List of Commonwealth Games medallists in swimming (women)
