= Caitlin McClatchey =

British swimmer

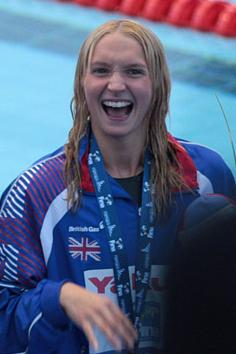

Personal information
- Full name: Caitlin McClatchey
- Nickname: Caits
- Born: 28 November 1985 (age 40) Portsmouth, Hampshire, England
- Height: 1.70 m (5 ft 7 in)
- Weight: 54 kg (119 lb; 8.5 st)

Sport
- Sport: Swimming
- Strokes: Freestyle
- Club: University of Edinburgh

Achievements and titles
- Personal bests: 100 m free LC: 54.31 (2008) 200 m free LC: 1:56.62 (2009) 400 m free LC: 4:07.02 (2005)
Medal record
Representing Great Britain
Event	1st	2nd	3rd
World Championships (LC)	0	0	2
World Championships (SC)	0	1	2
European Championships (LC)	0	1	1
Commonwealth Games	2	0	0
Universiade	0	0	2
Total	2	2	7
Women's swimming
Representing Great Britain
World Championships (LC)
Bronze medal – third place	2005 Montreal	400 m free
Bronze medal – third place	2009 Rome	4×200 m free
World Championships (SC)
Silver medal – second place	2008 Manchester	4×200 m free
Bronze medal – third place	2008 Manchester	200 m free
Bronze medal – third place	2008 Manchester	4×100 m free
European Championships (LC)
Silver medal – second place	2008 Eindhoven	4×200 m free
Bronze medal – third place	2006 Budapest	400 m free
Universiade
Bronze medal – third place	2013 Kazan	200 m free
Bronze medal – third place	2013 Kazan	400 m free
Representing Scotland
Commonwealth Games
Gold medal – first place	2006 Melbourne	200 m free
Gold medal – first place	2006 Melbourne	400 m free

Caitlin McClatchey (born 28 November 1985) is a British former swimmer. Representing Scotland, she won two gold medals at the 2006 Commonwealth Games, in the 200 metres freestyle and 400 metres freestyle. Representing Great Britain, she won bronze medals in the 400 m freestyle at the 2005 World Championships and 2006 European Championships. She has also competed at three Olympic Games and reached the Olympic 200 m freestyle final in 2008 and 2012. She is a former British record holder in the 100 m, 200 m and 400 m Freestyle.

She graduated with a politics degree from Loughborough University in 2011.

== Personal life ==
McClatchey was born in Portsmouth, Hampshire, England and raised in Brixworth, Northamptonshire, making her eligible for the England team. However, she chose to follow in the footsteps of her parents, John and Louise, who swam for the Scottish team at the 1970 and 1974 Commonwealth Games respectively. Her uncle Alan McClatchey was an Olympic bronze medallist in 1976. She competed in cross country running before opting to concentrate on swimming. She is a member of the University of Edinburgh swimming club, having previously been a member of Northampton swimming club.

McClatchey has been in a relationship with fellow swimmer Liam Tancock since 2006. They married in 2019. She started studying for a master's degree in Performance Psychology at the University of Edinburgh in January 2013.

== Career ==
McClatchey competed at her first Olympics in Athens 2004, finishing fifth as part of the British team in the 4×200 m freestyle relay. In 2005, she won a bronze medal in the 400 m freestyle in the 2005 World Championships.

Competing in the 2006 Commonwealth games, McClatchey made national headlines by winning two gold medals. McClatchey won her first Commonwealth gold in the 200 m freestyle, defeating Australian favourite Libby Lenton. In the 400 m freestyle she narrowly shaded a 3-way sprint for the line, winning in a time of 4:07.69. Also in 2006, she won a European Championship bronze medal in the 400 m freestyle.

McClatchey competed in the 2007 World Championships, but did not win a medal, placing 7th in the final of the 200 m freestyle and failing to reach the final in the 400 m freestyle. She swam in the British team that came 5th in the 4×200 m freestyle final, setting a new British record. McClatchey was disappointed in her results and said that she needed to revise her training schedule to build up muscle.

Selected for the 2008 Olympic Games she finished sixth in the 200m freestyle being the only Briton to reach the final. She was also selected for the 4 × 200 m freestyle relay team that was widely tipped for a chance of winning a medal, but a gamble to rest top swimmers; including McClatchey in the heats backfired and the team failed to qualify. This was particularly disappointing as McClatchey had already pulled out of the 100m freestyle individual event to concentrate on this. In 2009, she was a member of the British teams that set the UK records in the 4 × 100 metres and 4 × 200 m freestyle relays. As of 2014, both records still stand. She is also a former UK record holder in the 100, 200 and 400 m freestyle.

McClatchey competed for Scotland in the 2010 Commonwealth Games in Delhi, reaching the semi-finals of the 100-metre freestyle, finishing fifth in the 4 × 200-metre freestyle relay, fifth in the 4 × 100-metre freestyle relay, and fifth in the 4 × 100-metre medley relay.

At the 2012 Olympics in London, McClatchey reached the 200 m freestyle final, finishing seventh. She was also a member of the British teams that finished fifth in both the 4 × 100 m freestyle and 4 × 200 m freestyle relays.

In late 2012 McClatchey moved from Loughborough University, where she had been based for the previous eight years, to Edinburgh, after her coach Ian Armiger became head coach for the Cayman Islands. In Edinburgh she was coached by the head of performance swimming at the University of Edinburgh, Chris Jones.

McClatchey announced her retirement from competitive swimming in June 2015.

== Honours ==
McClatchey was inducted into the Scottish Swimming Hall of Fame in 2018.

== See also ==
- Commonwealth Games records in swimming
- List of Olympic medalists in swimming (women)
- List of World Aquatics Championships medalists in swimming (women)
- List of Commonwealth Games medallists in swimming (women)
