= Daniel Bell (New Zealand swimmer) =

New Zealand swimmer (born 1990)

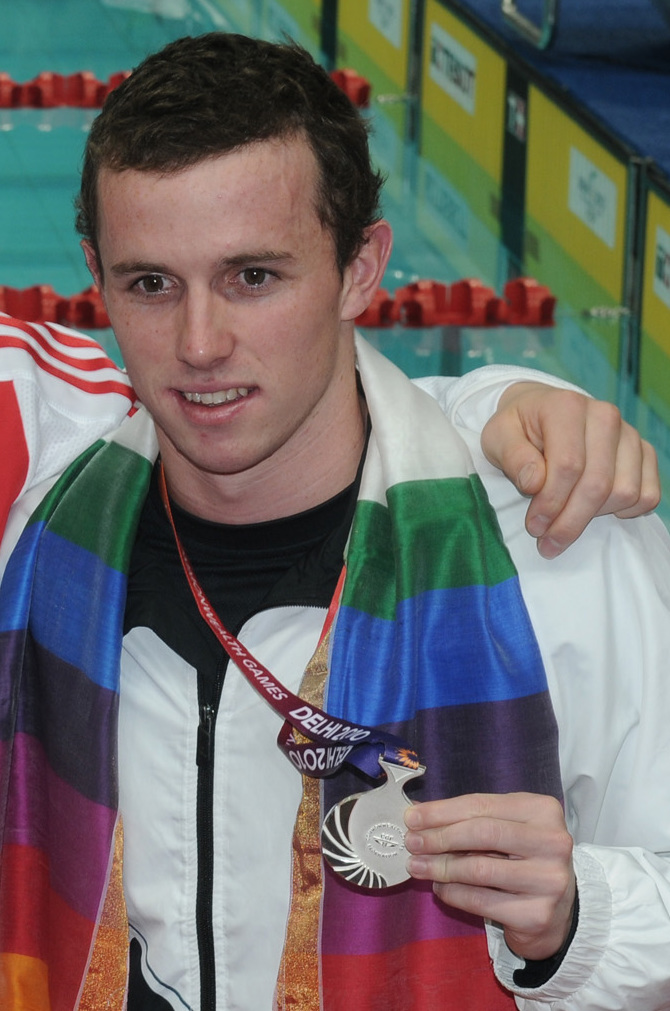
- Bell during the medal presentation ceremony of the XIX Commonwealth Games in 2010

Personal information
- Full name: Daniel Rae Bell
- Born: 9 May 1990 (age 36) Havelock North, New Zealand
Medal record
Men's swimming
Representing New Zealand
Commonwealth Games
Silver medal – second place	2010 Delhi	100 m backstroke

Daniel Rae Bell (born 9 May 1990) is a New Zealand swimmer. He swam for New Zealand at the 2008 Summer Olympics and 2012 Summer Olympics; his events being the 100 m butterfly & backstroke and the 4 × 100 m medley relay.

Bell won the silver medal in the 100 m backstroke at the 2010 Commonwealth Games, and he won three events at the 2008 FINA Youth World Swimming Championships.
