= Gareth Kean =

New Zealand swimmer

Personal information
- Born: 5 October 1991 (age 34) Wellington, New Zealand

Sport
- Sport: Swimming
- Strokes: Backstroke
- Club: High Performance Centre, Capital Swim Club
Medal record
Men's swimming
Representing New Zealand
Commonwealth Games
Silver medal – second place	2010 Delhi	200 m backstroke

Gareth Kean (born 5 October 1991) is a New Zealand swimmer. He won the silver medal in the 200 m backstroke at the 2010 Commonwealth Games and competed at the 2012 Olympic Games.

Kean is coached by former New Zealand Olympic and Commonwealth swimmer Gary Hurring. He has held the 100 m and 200 m backstroke national records.

Awards
Preceded by Sam Webster	Halberg Awards – Emerging Talent Award; 2010	Succeeded by Jacko Gill
