= Jessica Sylvester =

British swimmer

Personal information
- Full name: Jessica Sylvester
- Nationality: British
- Born: 9 July 1987 (age 38) Newcastle-under-Lyme, United Kingdom

Sport
- Sport: Swimming
- Strokes: Freestyle
- Club: Nova Centurion SC, Nottingham
Medal record
Women's swimming
Representing Great Britain
European Championships - LC
Silver medal – second place	2010 Budapest	4×100 m freestyle

Jessica Aimee Sylvester (born 9 July 1987 in Newcastle-under-Lyme, Staffordshire) is a British freestyle swimmer.

Sylvester represented Great Britain at the 2008 Summer Olympics in the 4×100 m freestyle relay swimming event.

Jessica was raised in the small Village of Cheddleton and attended Westwood High School in Leek, before leaving to attend Nottingham University.
