= Aquatics at the 2010 Commonwealth Games =

Aquatics at the 2010 Commonwealth Games at the Commonwealth Games
- Venue: Dr. S.P. Mukherjee Swimming Stadium, Talkatora Gardens
- Dates: 4 to 13 October 2010
- Competitors: 458 from 42 nations

Aquatics at the 2010 Commonwealth Games was the 19th appearances of both Swimming at the Commonwealth Games and Diving at the Commonwealth Games and the seventh and final appearance of Synchronised swimming at the Commonwealth Games. Competition was held in Delhi, India, from 4 to 13 October 2010 and featured contests in 56 disciplines: ten in Diving, 44 in Swimming and two in Synchronised swimming.

The aquatics events took place at the Dr. S.P. Mukherjee Swimming Stadium in Talkatora Gardens.

Australia topped the aquatics (all events) medal table with 24 gold medals.

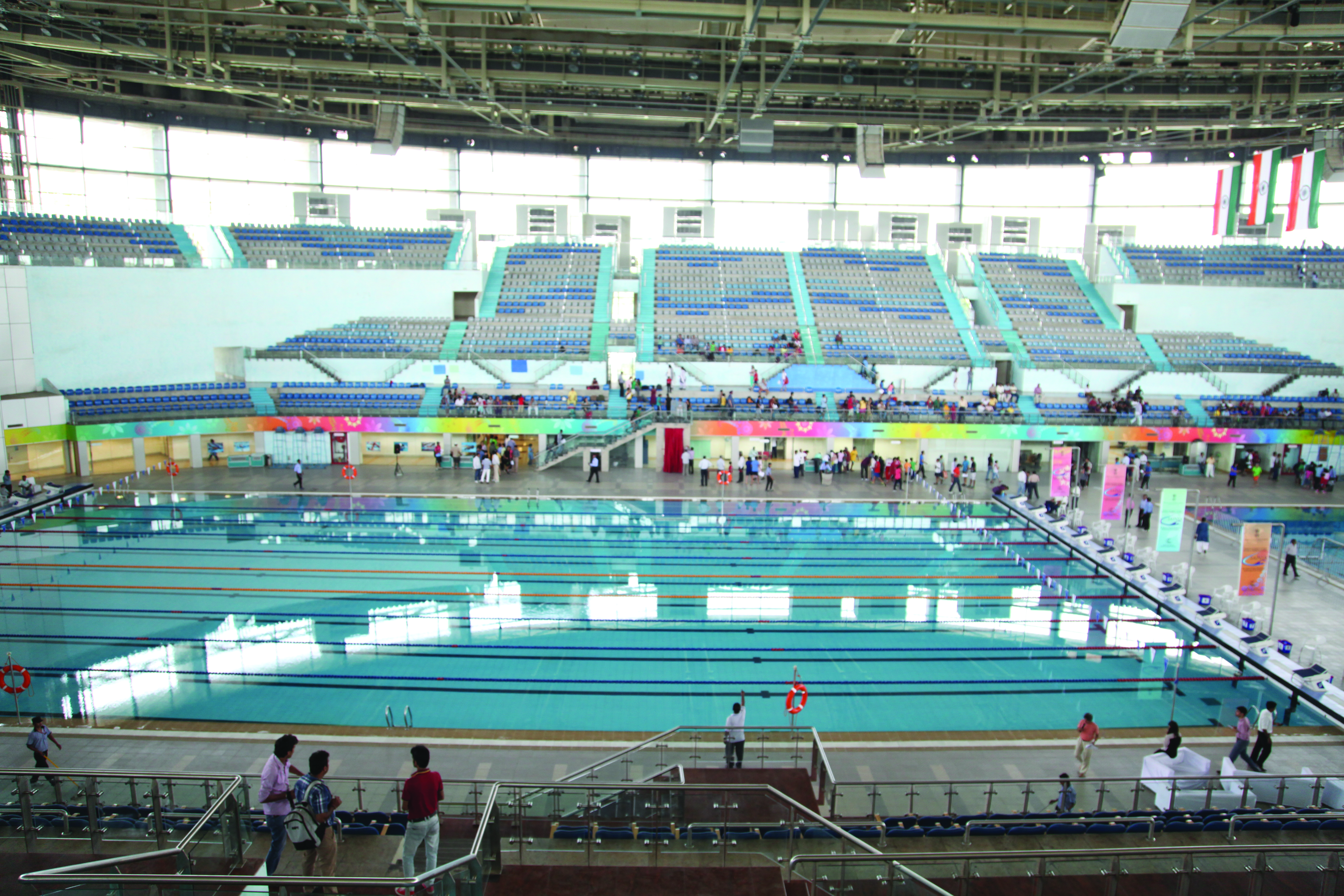
The Dr. S.P. Mukherjee Swimming Stadium

== Medal table (all aquatic sports) ==
Rank	Nation	Gold	Silver	Bronze	Total
1	Australia	24	23	23	70
2	Canada	12	3	6	21
3	England	9	18	11	38
4	South Africa	7	4	5	16
5	Scotland	2	3	2	7
6	Malaysia	1	1	2	4
7	Kenya	1	0	0	1
8	New Zealand	0	4	2	6
9	Wales	0	1	3	4
10	Papua New Guinea	0	1	0	1
11	India*	0	0	1	1
Totals (11 entries)		56	58	55	169

== Training venues ==
- Games Village
- Yamuna Sports Complex
- MDC National Stadium Complex
- Siri Fort Sports Complex
