= Zambia at the 2010 Commonwealth Games =

Sporting event delegation

Flag of Zambia

Zambia competed in the 2010 Commonwealth Games held in Delhi, India, from 3 to 14 October 2010. Because of a lack of money, the team was cut from 57 athletes to 22.

== Athletics ==
- Saviour Kombe
- Gift Soko
- Rachel Nachula
- Tonny Wamulwa

== Badminton ==
- Olga Siamupangile
- Eli Mambwe
- Juma Muwowo

== Boxing ==
- Brian Mwabu
- Precious Makina
- Martin Chibale
- Godfrey Mumba

== Lawn Bowls ==
- Foster Banda
- Matimba Hildah

== Squash ==
- Ray Simbule
- Lazarous Chilufua
- Kelvin Ndolvu

== Swimming ==
- Milimo Mweetwa
- Jade Howard
- Mercedes Milner
- Mark Thompson (9)
- Zane Jordan

== See also ==
- 2010 Commonwealth Games
