= Amaka Gessler =

New Zealand swimmer

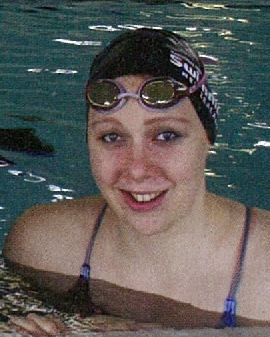
- Gessler in 2012

Personal information
- Full name: Amaka Louisa Gessler
- Nickname: Amaks
- Nationality: New Zealander
- Born: 24 April 1990 (age 36) Nigeria

Sport
- Sport: Swimming
- Strokes: Freestyle
Medal record
Women's swimming
Representing New Zealand
Commonwealth Games
Silver medal – second place	2010 Delhi	4×200 m freestyle
Bronze medal – third place	2010 Delhi	4×100 m freestyle
Universiade
Silver medal – second place	2011 Shenzhen	4×200 m freestyle

Amaka Louisa Gessler (born 24 April 1990) is a New Zealand swimmer. She won the silver medal in the 4 × 200 m freestyle relay at the 2010 Commonwealth Games alongside Lauren Boyle, Natasha Hind and Penelope Marshall. She won the bronze medal with the same team in the 4 × 100 m freestyle relay at the same Games. She also represented New Zealand at the 2012 Olympic games in the 4 × 200 m and 4 × 100 m freestyle relay
