= Natasha Hind =

New Zealand swimmer

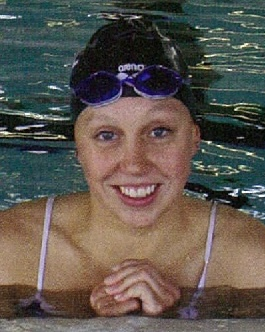
- Hind in 2012

Personal information
- Full name: Natasha Patricia Hind
- Born: 21 August 1989 (age 36) Wellington, New Zealand

Sport
- Country: New Zealand
- Sport: Swimming
- Strokes: Freestyle
Medal record
Women's swimming
Representing New Zealand
Commonwealth Games
Silver medal – second place	2010 Delhi	4×200 m freestyle
Bronze medal – third place	2010 Delhi	4×100 m freestyle
Universiade
Silver medal – second place	2011 Shenzhen	4×200 m freestyle

Natasha Patricia Hind (born 21 August 1989, Wellington) is a New Zealand representative swimmer. She won the silver medal in the 4 × 200 m freestyle relay at the 2010 Commonwealth Games alongside Lauren Boyle, Amaka Gessler and Penelope Marshall. She won the bronze medal with the same team in the 4 × 100 m freestyle relay at the same Games.

She has competed at two Olympics. In 2008, she was part of the New Zealand women's 4 × 200 m freestyle team, and in 2012 she was part of the women's 4 × 100 m and 4 × 200 m freestyle relay teams. She also competed in both events at the 2014 Commonwealth Games.

== See also ==
- List of Commonwealth Games medallists in swimming (women)
