= Amy Smith (swimmer) =

British swimmer

Personal information
- Full name: Amy Louis Smith
- National team: Great Britain
- Born: 24 July 1987 (age 38) Kidderminster, United Kingdom
- Height: 1.72 m (5 ft 8 in)
- Weight: 59 kg (130 lb)

Sport
- Sport: Swimming
- Strokes: Freestyle
Medal record
Women's swimming
Representing Great Britain
European Championships (LC)
| Gold medal – first place | 2010 Budapest | 4x100 m medley |
| Silver medal – second place | 2010 Budapest | 4x100 m freestyle |
European Championships (SC)
| Bronze medal – third place | 2011 Szczecin | 100 m freestyle |
Representing England
Commonwealth Games
| Silver medal – second place | 2006 Melbourne | 4×100 m freestyle |
| Silver medal – second place | 2010 Delhi | 4×100 m freestyle |
| Silver medal – second place | 2014 Glasgow | 4×100 m freestyle |

Amy Louis Smith (born 24 July 1987 in Kidderminster, Worcestershire) is a British swimmer.

Smith was at the pinnacle of sprinting for British women and a member of the national swim team for a decade. She had a busy programme at the 2012 Summer Olympics where she competed for the Great British team in the Women's 4 x 100 metre freestyle relay, finishing in 5th place in the final.

She also competed in the Women's 50 metre freestyle winning her heat swim off to qualify for the semi-final. She also made the semi-final for the Women's 100 metre freestyle but did not advance and swam the freestyle leg of the Women's 4 x 100 metre medley relay in the heat stage.

At the 2014 Commonwealth Games, she was part of the England 4 x 100 m freestyle team that won the silver and swam the heat for the silver medal winning 4 x 100 m medley team.

Smith is retired from competitive swimming, and works to coach swimmers through her swimming consultancy Swim Swift Elite, with her partner Joseph Roebuck.

== See also ==
- List of Commonwealth Games medallists in swimming (women)
