= Penelope Marshall =

New Zealand swimmer

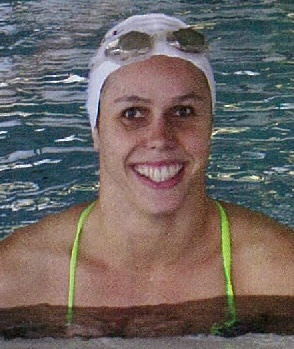
- Marshall in 2012

Personal information
- Full name: Penelope May Marshall
- Born: 27 July 1989 (age 36) Tauranga, New Zealand

Sport
- Country: New Zealand
- Sport: Swimming
- Strokes: Freestyle
Medal record
Women's swimming
Representing New Zealand
Commonwealth Games
Silver medal – second place	2010 Delhi	4x200m freestyle
Bronze medal – third place	2010 Delhi	4x100m freestyle

Penelope May Marshall (born 27 July 1989) is a New Zealand swimmer. She won the silver medal in the 4 × 200 m freestyle relay at the 2010 Commonwealth Games alongside Lauren Boyle, Amaka Gessler and Natasha Hind. She won the bronze medal with the same team in the 4 × 100 m freestyle relay at the same Games. She competed for New Zealand at the 2012 Summer Olympics in the women's 4 × 100 m freestyle relay.
