= Hayley Palmer =

New Zealand swimmer (born 1989)

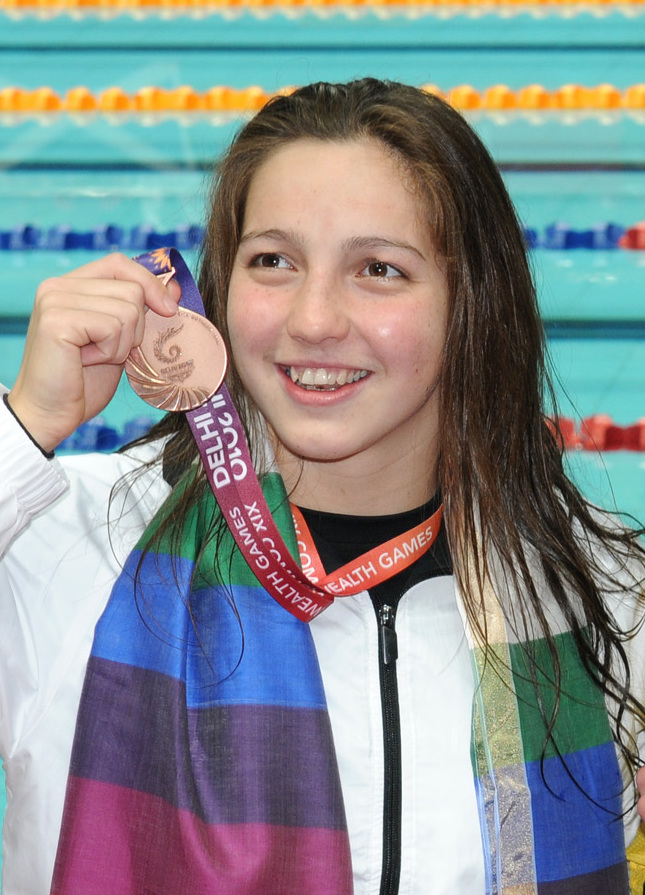

Personal information
- Full name: Hayley Gloria Palmer
- Nationality: New Zealand
- Born: 8 May 1989 (age 37)
- Height: 1.71 m (5 ft 7 in)
- Weight: 72 kg (159 lb)

Sport
- Sport: Swimming
- Strokes: Freestyle
- Club: North Shore Swimming Club (2007-present)
Medal record
Commonwealth Games
Bronze medal – third place	2010 Delhi	50 m freestyle
Bronze medal – third place	2010 Delhi	4x100 m freestyle

Hayley Gloria Palmer (born 8 May 1989 in Cheltenham) is an Olympian and National Record holding swimmer from New Zealand. She swam for NZ at the 2008 Beijing Olympic Games and 2012 Summer Olympics.

== Early life ==
Palmer was born in Cheltenham, England. However, both her parents are New Zealand nationals and they returned to New Zealand for two years when Palmer was young, before moving back to Cheltenham when she was 3. In Cheltenham, Palmer attended St Edwards School, and grammar school at the High School for Girls. She began swimming in England, before her return to New Zealand in 2007.

Her international debut for New Zealand was at the 2008 Short Course Worlds in Manchester in April 2008.

Her coach for the majority of her swimming career in England was Graham Brookhouse. During her early teenage years she was a member of the Gloucester City Swimming Club. She currently swims for North Shore Swimming in Auckland, and is coached by Randy Reese at Clearwater Aquatics in Florida.

She competed for New Zealand at the 2008 Summer Olympics in the women's 4 × 200 m freestyle relay.

At the 2010 Commonwealth Games in Delhi, Palmer won two bronze medals, in the 50m freestyle and 4 × 100 m freestyle relay.

At the 2012 Olympics, she competed in the 50 m freestyle and the 4 × 100 m freestyle.

== Personal life ==
Palmer is a Latter-day Saint.

== Swimming records ==
Palmer currently holds the following New Zealand Records:

- Women's Long Course 50m Freestyle (25.01)
- Women's Long Course 100m Freestyle (53.91)
- Women's Short Course 50m Freestyle (24.39)
- Women's Short Course 100m Freestyle (53.57)
