= Swimming at the 2009 World Aquatics Championships – Women's 200 metre breaststroke =

The heats for the women's 200 m breaststroke race at the 2009 World Championships took place in the morning and evening of 30 July and the final took place in the evening session of 31 July at the Foro Italico in Rome, Italy.

== Records ==
Prior to this competition, the existing world and competition records were as follows:

World record	Rebecca Soni (USA)	2:20.22	Beijing, China	15 August 2008
Championship record	Leisel Jones (AUS)	2:21.72	Montreal, Canada	29 July 2005

The following records were established during the competition:

Date	Round	Name	Nationality	Time	Record
30 July	Heat 6	Annamay Pierse	Canada	2:21.68	CR
30 July	Semifinal 1	Rebecca Soni	United States	2:20.93	CR
30 July	Semifinal 2	Annamay Pierse	Canada	2:20.12	WR

== Results ==
=== Heats ===
Rank	Name	Nationality	Time	Heat	Lane	Notes
1	Annamay Pierse	Canada	2:21.68	6	4	CR
2	Rebecca Soni	United States	2:22.09	7	4	
3	Mirna Jukić	Austria	2:22.10	7	5	ER
4	Nađa Higl	Serbia	2:23.19	4	7	
5	Nanaka Tamura	Japan	2:23.22	7	3	
6	Rie Kaneto	Japan	2:23.50	5	4	
6	Martha McCabe	Canada	2:23.50	5	5	
8	Keri Hehn	United States	2:23.60	7	6	
9	Ilaria Scarcella	Italy	2:24.20	5	3	
10	Rikke Møller-Pedersen	Denmark	2:24.46	5	9	NR
11	Jeong Darae	South Korea	2:25.00	6	7	
12	Joline Höstman	Sweden	2:25.15	7	2	NR
13	Caroline Ruhnau	Germany	2:25.57	7	1	
14	Sally Foster	Australia	2:26.07	7	7	
15	Yuliya Yefimova	Russia	2:26.18	6	3	
16	Sophie de Ronchi	France	2:26.45	6	2	
17	Marina Garcia	Spain	2:26.69	5	2	
18	Chiara Boggiatto	Italy	2:26.74	7	8	
19	Chen Huijia	China	2:26.82	3	4	
20	Sun Ye	China	2:27.08	5	6	
21	Sarah Katsoulis	Australia	2:27.32	5	7	
22	Sara Nordenstam	Norway	2:27.55	6	5	
23	Jessica Pengelly	South Africa	2:27.64	4	4	
24	Inna Kapishina	Belarus	2:27.89	7	0	
25	Urte Kazakeviciute	Lithuania	2:28.13	2	3	NR
26	Petra Chocova	Czech Republic	2:28.37	4	9	
27	Angeliki Exarchou	Greece	2:28.62	6	0	
28	Elise Matthysen	Belgium	2:29.05	5	8	
29	Raminta Dvariskyte	Lithuania	2:29.40	3	6	
30	Diana Gomes	Portugal	2:29.80	4	1	
31	Anastasia Korotkov	Israel	2:30.17	3	1	NR
32	Patrizia Humplik	Switzerland	2:30.27	6	8	
33	Agnieszka Ostrowska	Poland	2:30.59	4	3	
34	Lia Dekker	Netherlands	2:31.08	6	9	
35	Sarra Lajnef	Tunisia	2:31.12	4	2	
36	Back Su Yeon	South Korea	2:31.20	6	1	
37	Hrafnhildur Lúthersdóttir	Iceland	2:31.39	3	2	NR
38	Yekaterina Sadovnik	Kazakhstan	2:31.52	3	8	
39	Stacey Tadd	Great Britain	2:32.01	4	0	
40	Siow Yi Ting	Malaysia	2:32.09	7	9	
41	Fanny Lecluyse	Belgium	2:32.93	3	5	
42	Katheryn Meaklim	South Africa	2:33.10	4	5	
43	Yuliya Banach	Israel	2:33.95	4	8	
44	Tatiane Sakemi	Brazil	2:34.11	4	6	
45	Valentina Artemyeva	Russia	2:34.34	6	1	
46	Tanja Šmid	Slovenia	2:37.43	3	7	
47	Daniela Victoria	Venezuela	2:37.65	3	0	
48	Maxine Heard	Zimbabwe	2:37.77	2	1	NR
49	Daniela Lindemeier	Namibia	2:39.71	2	2	NR
50	Nibal Yamout	Lebanon	2:43.44	2	5	
51	Roanne Ho	Singapore	2:43.72	2	0	
52	Maria Coy	Guatemala	2:44.09	2	6	
53	Cheryl Lim	Singapore	2:44.33	3	9	
54	Selma Atic	Bosnia and Herzegovina	2:45.00	2	7	
55	Chen I-Chuan	Chinese Taipei	2:45.30	2	4	
56	Maria Zenoni	Dominican Republic	2:45.57	2	9	NR
57	Lei On Kei	Macau	2:51.88	2	8	
58	Karen Vilorio	Honduras	2:54.35	1	5	
59	Murugaperumal Venpa	India	3:00.51	1	3	
60	Danielle Bernadine Findlay	Zambia	3:02.16	1	6	
61	Aqsa Tariq	Pakistan	3:16.33	1	7	
62	Aelia Mehdi	Pakistan	3:31.32	1	1	
–	Tea Pikuli	Albania	DNS	1	2	
–	Dilara Buse Gunaydin	Turkey	DNS	3	3	
–	Hannah Miley	Great Britain	DNS	5	1	
–	Stephanie Rasoamanana	Madagascar	DSQ	1	4	
–	Carolina Mussi	Brazil	DSQ	5	0	

=== Semifinals ===
Rank	Name	Nationality	Time	Heat	Lane	Notes
1	Annamay Pierse	Canada	2:20.12	2	4	WR
2	Rebecca Soni	United States	2:20.93	1	4	
3	Mirna Jukić	Austria	2:22.13	2	5	
4	Joline Höstman	Sweden	2:22.24	1	7	NR
5	Nađa Higl	Serbia	2:22.28	1	5	
6	Martha McCabe	Canada	2:22.75	2	6	
7	Nanaka Tamura	Japan	2:22.83	2	3	
8	Rie Kaneto	Japan	2:22.92	1	3	
9	Keri Hehn	United States	2:23.20	1	6	
10	Ilaria Scarcella	Italy	2:23.32	2	2	NR
11	Rikke Møller Pedersen	Denmark	2:23.34	1	2	NR
12	Jeong Darae	South Korea	2:25.00	2	7	
13	Caroline Ruhnau	Germany	2:25.36	2	1	
14	Yuliya Yefimova	Russia	2:26.39	2	8	
15	Sally Foster	Australia	2:27.03	1	1	
16	Sophie de Ronchi	France	2:28.75	1	8	

=== Final ===
Rank	Name	Nationality	Time	Lane	Notes
1st place, gold medalist(s)	Nađa Higl	Serbia	2:21.62	2	ER
2nd place, silver medalist(s)	Annamay Pierse	Canada	2:21.84	4	
3rd place, bronze medalist(s)	Mirna Jukić	Austria	2:21.97	3	NR
4	Rebecca Soni	USA	2:22.15	5	
5	Rie Kaneto	Japan	2:23.03	8	
6	Nanaka Tamura	Japan	2:23.12	1	
7	Martha McCabe	Canada	2:23.36	7	
8	Joline Höstman	Sweden	2:23.62	6	
