= Swimming at the 2009 World Aquatics Championships – Women's 100 metre breaststroke =

Women's 100 metre breastroke at the 2009 FINA World Championships
- Venue: Foro Italico
- Dates: 27 July 2009 (heats, semifinals); 28 July 2009 (final)
- Competitors: 96
- Winning time: 1:04.93

Medalists
| gold medal | Rebecca Soni | United States |
| silver medal | Yuliya Yefimova | Russia |
| bronze medal | Kasey Carlson | United States |

The heats for the Women's 100m Breaststroke race at the 2009 World Championships took place on Monday, 27 July (prelims and semifinals) and Tuesday 28 July (final) at the Foro Italico in Rome, Italy.

== Records ==
Prior to this competition, the existing world and competition records were as follows:

| World record | Leisel Jones (AUS) | 1:05.09 | Melbourne, Australia | 20 March 2006 |
| Championship record | Leisel Jones (AUS) | 1:05.72 | Melbourne, Australia | 27 March 2007 |

The following records were established during the competition:

| Date | Round | Name | Nationality | Time | Record |
|---|---|---|---|---|---|
| 27 July | Heat 10 | Rebecca Soni | United States | 1:05.66 | CR |
| 27 July | Semifinal 2 | Rebecca Soni | United States | 1:04.84 | WR |

== Results ==
=== Heats ===
| Rank | Name | Nationality | Time | Heat | Lane | Notes |
|---|---|---|---|---|---|---|
| 1 | Rebecca Soni | United States | 1:05.66 | 10 | 4 | CR |
| 2 | Yuliya Yefimova | Russia | 1:06.42 | 8 | 4 | |
| 3 | Mirna Jukić | Austria | 1:06.58 | 9 | 3 | NR |
| 4 | Rikke Møller-Pedersen | Denmark | 1:06.61 | 8 | 8 | NR |
| 5 | Annamay Pierse | Canada | 1:06.68 | 9 | 4 | |
| 6 | Tarnee White | Australia | 1:06.91 | 10 | 3 | |
| 7 | Sarah Katsoulis | Australia | 1:06.98 | 8 | 9 | |
| 8 | Ilaria Scarcella | Italy | 1:07.23 | 8 | 5 | |
| 9 | Caroline Ruhnau | Germany | 1:07.25 | 10 | 1 | |
| 10 | Kasey Carlson | United States | 1:07.29 | 9 | 5 | |
| 11 | Sarah Poewe | Germany | 1:07.32 | 8 | 2 | |
| 12 | Chiara Boggiatto | Italy | 1:07.42 | 8 | 7 | |
| 13 | Nanaka Tamura | Japan | 1:07.46 | 9 | 2 | |
| 14 | Chen Huijia | China | 1:07.51 | 9 | 6 | |
| 15 | Nađa Higl | Serbia | 1:07.80 | 5 | 1 | |
| 15 | Joline Höstman | Sweden | 1:07.80 | 8 | 1 | |
| 17 | Katharina Stiberg | Norway | 1:07.84 | 8 | 9 | NR |
| 18 | Lia Dekker | Netherlands | 1:07.92 | 8 | 6 | |
| 19 | Moniek Nijhuis | Netherlands | 1:08.02 | 10 | 6 | |
| 20 | Lowri Tynan | Great Britain | 1:08.30 | 7 | 9 | |
| 21 | Angeliki Exarchou | Greece | 1:08.39 | 10 | 9 | NR |
| 22 | Amanda Reason | Canada | 1:08.41 | 10 | 5 | |
| 23 | Hitomi Nose | Japan | 1:08.43 | 10 | 7 | |
| 24 | Elise Matthysen | Belgium | 1:08.45 | 10 | 8 | |
| 25 | Carolina Mussi | Brazil | 1:08.66 | 9 | 8 | |
| 26 | Inna Kapishina | Belarus | 1:08.69 | 6 | 5 | |
| 27 | Valentina Artemyeva | Russia | 1:08.77 | 10 | 2 | |
| 28 | Rebecca Ejdervik | Sweden | 1:08.96 | 7 | 8 | |
| 29 | Yekaterina Sadovnik | Kazakhstan | 1:09.05 | 6 | 8 | |
| 30 | Marina Garcia | Spain | 1:09.07 | 10 | 0 | |
| 31 | Yuliya Banach | Israel | 1:09.18 | 8 | 0 | |
| 31 | Wang Randi | China | 1:09.18 | 9 | 1 | |
| 33 | Ewa Scieszko | Poland | 1:09.30 | 7 | 3 | |
| 34 | Jung Ha-eun | Korea | 1:09.35 | 6 | 6 | |
| 35 | Tatiane Sakemi | Brazil | 1:09.58 | 9 | 7 | |
| 36 | Sara Nordenstam | Norway | 1:09.69 | 9 | 9 | |
| 37 | Diana Gomes | Portugal | 1:09.83 | 7 | 5 | |
| 38 | Katja Lehtonen | Finland | 1:10.28 | 5 | 2 | |
| 39 | Anastasia Korotkov | Israel | 1:10.46 | 5 | 9 | |
| 40 | Anna Khlistunova | Ukraine | 1:10.47 | 7 | 4 | |
| 41 | Sarra Lajnef | Tunisia | 1:10.60 | 5 | 0 | NR |
| 41 | Réka Pecz | Hungary | 1:10.60 | 6 | 1 | |
| 43 | Jane Trepp | Estonia | 1:10.61 | 6 | 0 | NR |
| 44 | Raminta Dvariskyte | Lithuania | 1:10.63 | 6 | 2 | NR |
| 45 | Petra Chocova | Czech Republic | 1:10.64 | 7 | 1 | |
| 46 | Nina Sovinek | Slovenia | 1:10.66 | 7 | 2 | |
| 47 | Fiona Doyle | Ireland | 1:10.93 | 4 | 3 | |
| 48 | Patrizia Humplik | Switzerland | 1:10.99 | 7 | 6 | |
| 49 | Hrafnhildur Hrafnhildur Lúthersdóttir | Iceland | 1:11.04 | 6 | 3 | |
| 50 | Ana Marisa Brito | Portugal | 1:11.06 | 6 | 4 | |
| 51 | Martina Dankova | Czech Republic | 1:11.19 | 4 | 2 | |
| 52 | Louise Henley | Great Britain | 1:11.25 | 7 | 0 | |
| 53 | Tanja Šmid | Slovenia | 1:11.53 | 5 | 4 | |
| 54 | Agnieszka Ostrowska | Poland | 1:11.54 | 6 | 7 | |
| 55 | Back Su Yeon | Korea | 1:11.58 | 7 | 7 | |
| 56 | Anastasia Christoforou | Cyprus | 1:11.68 | 5 | 8 | NR |
| 57 | Daniela Victoria | Venezuela | 1:11.70 | 5 | 7 | NR |
| 58 | Roanne Ho | Singapore | 1:12.11 | 4 | 4 | |
| 59 | Urte Kazakeviciute | Lithuania | 1:12.24 | 5 | 3 | |
| 60 | Alicia Lightbourne | Bahamas | 1:12.60 | 4 | 1 | |
| 61 | Maxine Heard | Zimbabwe | 1:12.94 | 3 | 6 | |
| 62 | Ashley Bransford | Aruba | 1:13.24 | 3 | 2 | |
| 63 | Daniela Lindemeier | Namibia | 1:13.82 | 4 | 9 | NR |
| 64 | Dilara Buse Gunaydin | Turkey | 1:13.97 | 6 | 9 | |
| 65 | Danielle Beaubrun | Saint Lucia | 1:14.38 | 4 | 3 | |
| 66 | Kimba Collymore | Trinidad and Tobago | 1:14.67 | 4 | 7 | |
| 67 | Chen I-Chuan | Chinese Taipei | 1:14.75 | 5 | 6 | |
| 68 | Cheryl Lim | Singapore | 1:15.63 | 3 | 4 | |
| 69 | Maria Coy | Guatemala | 1:15.67 | 3 | 5 | |
| 70 | Nibal Yamout | Lebanon | 1:16.55 | 4 | 6 | |
| 71 | Maria Zenoni | Dominican Republic | 1:16.66 | 3 | 0 | NR |
| 72 | Lei On Kei | Macau | 1:17.18 | 4 | 0 | |
| 73 | Selma Atic | Bosnia and Herzegovina | 1:17.39 | 3 | 3 | |
| 74 | Rachel Tonjor | Nigeria | 1:18.22 | 2 | 3 | NR |
| 75 | Melinda Sue Micallef | Malta | 1:18.66 | 3 | 7 | |
| 76 | Labake Anthonia Oriretan | Nigeria | 1:18.89 | 2 | 5 | |
| 77 | Sara Abdullahu | Albania | 1:19.45 | 3 | 1 | NR |
| 78 | Ana Euceda Gutierrez | Honduras | 1:21.81 | 2 | 6 | |
| 79 | Stephanie Rasoamanana | Madagascar | 1:22.11 | 3 | 8 | |
| 80 | Amanda Jia Xin Liew | Brunei | 1:22.89 | 3 | 9 | |
| 81 | Gantumur Oyungerel | Mongolia | 1:23.25 | 2 | 7 | |
| 82 | Murugaperumal Venpa | India | 1:24.85 | 2 | 2 | |
| 83 | Mirella Alam | Lebanon | 1:25.15 | 2 | 4 | |
| 84 | Clarissa Brady | Marshall Islands | 1:25.47 | 2 | 8 | |
| 85 | Jamila Lunkuse | Uganda | 1:25.49 | 1 | 2 | |
| 86 | Jessika Cossa | Mozambique | 1:26.04 | 1 | 3 | |
| 87 | Jade Ashleigh Howard | Zambia | 1:26.25 | 2 | 0 | |
| 88 | Tea Pikuli | Albania | 1:30.13 | 1 | 5 | |
| 89 | Adele Rova | Fiji | 1:30.24 | 2 | 9 | |
| 90 | Aqsa Tariq | Pakistan | 1:30.75 | 1 | 4 | |
| 91 | Amnahliyani Mohamad Husain | Brunei | 1:33.99 | 1 | 6 | |
| 92 | Aelia Mehdi | Pakistan | 1:35.03 | 1 | 7 | |
| 93 | Ismail Aminath Inas | Maldives | 1:39.11 | 1 | 8 | |
| 94 | Svetlana Dogadkina | Tajikistan | 1:42.04 | 2 | 1 | |
| — | Maria Georgia Michalaka | Greece | DNS | 9 | 0 | |
| — | Siow Yi Ting | Malaysia | DSQ | 5 | 5 | |

=== Semifinals ===
| Rank | Name | Nationality | Time | Heat | Lane | Notes |
|---|---|---|---|---|---|---|
| 1 | Rebecca Soni | United States | 1:04.84 | 2 | 4 | WR |
| 2 | Yuliya Yefimova | Russia | 1:05.84 | 1 | 4 | |
| 3 | Sarah Katsoulis | Australia | 1:06.23 | 2 | 6 | |
| 4 | Annamay Pierse | Canada | 1:06.34 | 2 | 3 | |
| 5 | Rikke Møller-Pedersen | Denmark | 1:06.50 | 1 | 5 | NR |
| 6 | Mirna Jukić | Austria | 1:06.83 | 2 | 5 | |
| 7 | Kasey Carlson | United States | 1:06.95 | 1 | 2 | |
| 8 | Sarah Poewe | Germany | 1:07.10 | 2 | 7 | =NR |
| 9 | Chiara Boggiatto | Italy | 1:07.16 | 1 | 7 | |
| 10 | Joline Höstman | Sweden | 1:07.21 | 1 | 8 | NR |
| 11 | Tarnee White | Australia | 1:07.26 | 1 | 3 | |
| 12 | Chen Huijia | China | 1:07.27 | 1 | 1 | |
| 13 | Ilaria Scarcella | Italy | 1:07.42 | 1 | 6 | |
| 14 | Caroline Ruhnau | Germany | 1:07.60 | 2 | 2 | |
| 15 | Nanaka Tamura | Japan | 1:07.70 | 2 | 1 | |
| 16 | Nađa Higl | Serbia | 1:08.13 | 2 | 8 | |

=== Final ===
| Rank | Name | Nationality | Time | Lane | Notes |
|---|---|---|---|---|---|
| 1st place, gold medalist(s) | Rebecca Soni | United States | 1:04.93 | 4 | |
| 2nd place, silver medalist(s) | Yuliya Yefimova | Russia | 1:05.41 | 5 | ER |
| 3rd place, bronze medalist(s) | Kasey Carlson | United States | 1:05.75 | 1 | |
| 4 | Sarah Katsoulis | Australia | 1:05.86 | 3 | |
| 5 | Annamay Pierse | Canada | 1:06.37 | 6 | |
| 6 | Rikke Møller-Pedersen | Denmark | 1:06.38 | 2 | NR |
| 7 | Mirna Jukić | Austria | 1:06.75 | 7 | |
| 8 | Sarah Poewe | Germany | 1:07.01 | 8 | NR |

== See also ==
- Swimming at the 2007 World Aquatics Championships – Women's 100 metre breaststroke
- Swimming at the 2008 Summer Olympics – Women's 100 metre breaststroke
