= Swimming at the 2009 World Aquatics Championships – Women's 50 metre breaststroke =

The heats for the women's 50 m breaststroke race at the 2009 World Championships took place in the morning of 1 August, with the final in the evening session of 2 August at the Foro Italico in Rome, Italy.

== Records ==
Prior to this competition, the existing world and competition records were as follows:

World record	Amanda Reason (CAN)	30.23	Montreal, Canada	8 July 2009
Championship record	Jade Edmistone (AUS)	30.45	Montreal, Canada	31 July 2005

The following records were established during the competition:

Date	Round	Name	Nationality	Time	Record
1 August	Heat 10	Kasey Carlson	United States	30.34	CR
1 August	Heat 12	Yuliya Yefimova	Russia	30.24	CR
2 August	Final	Yuliya Yefimova	Russia	30.09	WR

== Results ==
=== Heats ===
Rank	Name	Nationality	Time	Heat	Lane	Notes
1	Yuliya Yefimova	Russia	30.24	12	4	CR, ER
2	Kasey Carlson	USA	30.34	10	6	NR
3	Sarah Katsoulis	Australia	30.48	10	5	
4	Moniek Nijhuis	Netherlands	30.57	12	3	NR
5	Amanda Reason	Canada	30.73	10	4	
6	Kerstin Vogel	Germany	30.77	10	7	NR
7	Rebecca Soni	USA	30.82	11	6	
8	Tarnee White	Australia	30.96	12	5	
9	Annamay Pierse	Canada	31.02	11	5	
10	Sophie de Ronchi	France	31.06	12	6	
11	Valentina Artemyeva	Russia	31.10	11	4	
12	Georgia Holderness	Great Britain	31.11	7	5	
12	Katharina Stiberg	Norway	31.11	9	4	NR
14	Roberta Panara	Italy	31.13	12	2	
15	Katja Lehtonen	Finland	31.14	9	6	
16	Lowri Tynan	Great Britain	31.15	8	5	
17	Rikke Moller-Pedersen	Denmark	31.23	11	0	NR
18	Concepcion Badillo	Spain	31.27	11	7	
19	Inna Kapishina	Belarus	31.29	9	7	
20	Achieng Ajulu-Bushell	Kenya	31.30	10	0	NR
21	Jane Trepp	Estonia	31.32	9	2	NR
21	Mirna Jukić	Austria	31.32	10	8	NR
21	Caroline Ruhnau	Germany	31.32	12	1	
24	Ana Carla Carvalho	Brazil	31.38	12	7	
25	Angeliki Exarchou	Greece	31.52	9	5	NR
26	Kim Daleun	Korea	31.55	10	2	
27	Tatiane Sakemi	Brazil	31.61	11	3	
28	Hitomi Nose	Japan	31.68	10	1	
29	Ewa Scieszko	Poland	31.69	8	4	
29	Petra Chocova	Czech Republic	31.69	10	9	
31	Rebecca Ejdervik	Sweden	31.77	11	8	
32	Wang Randi	China	31.79	11	2	
33	Kim Hyejin	Korea	31.82	9	1	
34	Yekaterina Sadovnik	Kazakhstan	31.85	7	6	
35	Anastasia Christoforou	Cyprus	31.87	9	3	
36	Joline Höstman	Sweden	31.88	12	9	
37	Yuliya Banach	Israel	31.98	9	8	NR
37	Martina Carraro	Italy	31.98	11	1	
39	Ana Marisa Brito	Portugal	32.00	11	9	
40	Elise Matthysen	Belgium	32.12	8	6	NR
41	Joana Carvalho	Portugal	32.24	12	0	
42	Urte Kazakeviciute	Lithuania	32.37	7	7	NR
43	Doaa Reda Masarwa	Israel	32.46	8	8	
44	Raminta Dvariskyte	Lithuania	32.53	7	2	
45	Tanja Šmid	Slovenia	32.55	8	0	
46	Sarra Lajnef	Tunisia	32.68	7	4	NR
47	Hrafnhildur Lúthersdóttir	Iceland	32.71	8	3	
48	Alicia Lightbourne	Bahamas	32.84	6	7	NR
49	Anna Khlistunova	Ukraine	32.87	7	1	
50	Roanne Ho	Singapore	32.93	9	9	
51	Daniela Victoria	Venezuela	32.95	8	1	
52	Martina Dankova	Czech Republic	32.97	7	0	
53	Lei On Kei	Macau	33.34	6	5	
54	Agnieszka Ostrowska	Poland	33.36	7	8	
55	Veronica Vdovicenco	Moldova	33.46	8	7	
56	Jonay Briedenhann	Namibia	33.50	6	8	NR
57	Kimba Collymore	Trinidad and Tobago	33.61	6	4	
58	Maxine Heard	Zimbabwe	33.70	5	5	NR
59	Carolina Colorado Henao	Colombia	33.93	7	9	
59	Dilara Buse Gunaydin	Turkey	33.93	8	9	
61	Danielle Beaubrun	Saint Lucia	33.95	6	2	
62	Daniela Lindemeier	Namibia	34.12	5	4	
63	Cherelle Thompson	Trinidad and Tobago	34.87	6	6	
64	Maria Zenoni	Dominican Republic	34.93	5	1	NR
65	Labake Anthonia Oriretan	Nigeria	34.95	5	8	
66	Monica Bernardo	Mozambique	35.07	4	5	
67	Racheal Tonjor	Nigeria	35.15	5	0	
68	Cheryl Lim	Singapore	35.20	6	9	
69	Selma Atic	Bosnia and Herzegovina	35.72	6	1	
70	Nibal Yamout	Lebanon	35.74	6	3	
71	Melinda Sue Micallef	Malta	35.77	5	3	
72	Nilshaira Isenia	Netherlands Antilles	35.87	6	0	
73	Amanda Jia Xin Liew	Brunei	35.90	4	7	NR
74	Karla Toscano	Guatemala	36.35	5	2	
75	Karen Vilorio	Honduras	36.55	5	7	
76	Doli Akhter	Bangladesh	36.62	4	3	
77	Ana Euceda Gutierrez	Honduras	36.74	4	2	
78	Gantumur Oyungerel	Mongolia	37.00	3	7	
79	Stephanie Rasoamanana	Madagascar	37.17	5	6	
80	Clarissa Brady	Marshall Islands	37.29	4	6	
81	Jessika Cossa	Mozambique	37.81	3	5	
82	Mirella Alam	Lebanon	37.88	5	9	
83	Tea Pikuli	Albania	37.94	4	0	
84	Debora Keci	Albania	38.24	4	4	
85	Jamila Lunkuse	Uganda	38.90	3	2	
86	Mariam Foum	Tanzania	39.07	2	0	
87	Adele Rova	Fiji	39.09	3	3	
88	Rayleen David	Federated States of Micronesia	39.42	2	5	
89	Jade Ashleigh Howard	Zambia	39.51	3	4	
90	Noelle Anyika Smith	Guyana	40.39	3	0	
91	Sabine Hazboun	Palestine	40.61	4	9	
92	Danielle Bernadine Findlay	Zambia	40.65	3	6	
93	Murugaperumal Venpa	India	40.67	4	1	
94	Julia Alves	Marshall Islands	41.08	2	3	
95	Debra Daniel	Federated States of Micronesia	41.43	2	4	
96	Amnahliyani Mohamad Husain	Bahrain	41.65	3	8	
97	Aelia Mehdi	Pakistan	41.81	3	9	
98	Maria Gibbons	Palau	41.85	2	6	
99	Aqsa Tariq	Pakistan	42.55	3	1	
100	Angele Gbenou Mahutin	Benin	43.26	1	6	
101	Angelika Sita Ouedraogo	Burkina Faso	44.71	1	5	
102	Aicha Oumar Coulibaly	Mali	46.12	2	1	
103	Svetlana Dogadkina	Tajikistan	46.51	7	3	
104	Ismail Aminath Inas	Maldives	46.91	2	2	
105	Awa Keita	Mali	47.48	1	4	
106	Catherine Decker	Tanzania	48.23	2	8	
107	Antja Flowers	Palau	48.25	2	7	
–	Elsa Partio Fatima Traore	Burkina Faso	DQ	1	3	
–	Ouleye Diallo	Senegal	DNS	4	8	
–	Sara Nordenstam	Norway	DNS	8	2	
–	Maria Georgia Michalaka	Greece	DNS	9	0	
–	Chen Huijia	China	DNS	10	3	
–	Nanaka Tamura	Japan	DNS	12	8	

=== Semifinals ===
Rank	Name	Nationality	Time	Heat	Lane	Notes
1	Sarah Katsoulis	Australia	30.33	2	5	
2	Moniek Nijhuis	Netherlands	30.38	1	5	NR
3	Yuliya Yefimova	Russia	30.40	2	4	
4	Amanda Reason	Canada	30.42	2	3	
5	Kasey Carlson	United States	30.46	1	4	
6	Rebecca Soni	United States	30.56	2	6	
7	Tarnee White	Australia	30.80	1	6	
8	Valentina Artemyeva	Russia	30.92	2	7	
8	Annamay Pierse	Canada	30.92	2	2	
10	Lowri Tynan	Great Britain	31.03	1	8	
11	Kerstin Vogel	Germany	31.04	1	3	
12	Katharina Stiberg	Norway	31.09	2	1	NR
13	Sophie de Ronchi	France	31.12	1	2	
14	Roberta Panara	Italy	31.16	1	1	
15	Georgia Holderness	Great Britain	31.25	1	7	
16	Katja Lehtonen	Finland	31.37	2	8	

==== Swim-off ====
Rank	Name	Nationality	Time	Lane	Notes
1	Annamay Pierse	Canada	30.98	5	
2	Valentina Artemyeva	Russia	30.99	4	

=== Final ===
Rank	Name	Nationality	Time	Lane	Notes
1st place, gold medalist(s)	Yuliya Yefimova	Russia	30.09	3	WR
2nd place, silver medalist(s)	Rebecca Soni	United States	30.11	7	AM
3rd place, bronze medalist(s)	Sarah Katsoulis	Australia	30.16	4	OC
4	Moniek Nijhuis	Netherlands	30.46	5	
5	Annamay Pierse	Canada	30.53	8	
6	Kasey Carlson	United States	30.65	2	
7	Amanda Reason	Canada	30.67	6	
8	Tarnee White	Australia	30.91	1	
