= 2010 FINA World Swimming Championships (25 m) – Women's 50 metre breaststroke =

Women's 50m Breaststroke at the 2010 Short Course Worlds
- Dates: 15 December 2010 (heats and semifinals); 16 December 2010 (final)
- Competitors: 64
- Winning time: 29.83

Medalists
gold medal	Rebecca Soni	United States
silver medal	Leiston Pickett	Australia
bronze medal	Zhao Jin	China

The Women's 50 Breaststroke at the 10th FINA World Swimming Championships (25m) was swum 15–16 December 2010 in Dubai, United Arab Emirates. The heats and semifinals were swum 15 December; the final on 16 December.

64 swimmers swam the race. At the start of the event, the existing World (WR) and Championship records (CR) were:

- WR: 28.80, (United States) Jessica Hardy, (Berlin, Germany, 15 November 2009)
- CR: 29.58, (United States) Jessica Hardy, (Manchester 2008)

== Results ==
=== Heats ===
Rank	Heat	Lane	Name	Time	Notes
1	6	5	Yuliya Yefimova (RUS)	30.10	Q
2	6	4	Rebecca Soni (USA)	30.11	Q
3	6	3	Leiston Pickett (AUS)	30.30	Q
4	8	5	Jane Trepp (EST)	30.36	Q
5	6	2	Zhao Jin (CHN)	30.41	Q
6	5	2	Alia Atkinson (JAM)	30.44	Q
7	6	6	Sarah Katsoulis (AUS)	30.50	Q
8	7	5	Jennie Johansson (SWE)	30.57	Q
9	8	6	Dorothea Brandt (GER)	30.58	Q
10	1	8	Wang Randi (CHN)	30.73	Q
11	7	4	Moniek Nijhuis (NED)	30.79	Q
12	8	8	Hrafnhildur Lúthersdóttir (ISL)	30.97	Q
13	8	3	Rikke Pedersen (DEN)	31.08	Q
14	8	2	Amanda Reason (CAN)	31.14	Q
15	7	2	Petra Chocova (CZE)	31.18	Q
16	7	3	Katharina Stiberg (NOR)	31.30	Q
17	7	8	Tatiane Sakemi (BRA)	31.38	
18	7	1	Stéphanie Spahn (SUI)	31.52	
19	6	1	Caroline Reitshammer (AUT)	31.58	
20	8	4	Mina Matsushima (JPN)	31.61	
21	8	7	Micah Lawrence (USA)	31.62	
22	7	6	Daria Deyeva (RUS)	31.63	
23	6	7	Annamay Pierse (CAN)	31.67	
24	4	2	Sara El Bekri (MAR)	31.85	
25	8	1	Chiara Boggiatto (ITA)	31.86	
26	5	6	Julyana Kury (BRA)	31.94	
27	5	5	Tjasa Vozel (SLO)	31.96	
28	5	3	Dilara Buse Gunaydin (TUR)	31.97	
29	5	1	Danielle Beaudrun (LCA)	32.01	
30	6	8	Sviatlana Khakhlova (BLR)	32.08	
31	7	7	Kong Yvette Man Yi (HKG)	32.10	
32	4	3	Anastasia Christoforou (CYP)	32.27	
32	5	7	Agustina de Giovanni (ARG)	32.27	
34	4	5	Rie Kaneto (JPN)	32.34	
35	5	4	Chen I-Chuan (TPE)	32.37	
36	4	1	Daniela Victoria (VEN)	32.67	
37	4	4	Henriette Brekke (NOR)	32.81	
38	4	7	Lei On Kei (MAC)	32.90	
39	5	8	Thi Hue Pham (VIE)	33.83	
40	3	4	Daniela Lindemeier (NAM)	33.85	
41	3	5	Melinda Sue Micallef (MLT)	34.57	
42	3	3	Micaela Cloete (NAM)	34.94	
43	1	7	Sin Jin Hui (PRK)	35.08	
44	4	8	Maxine Heard (ZIM)	35.11	
45	3	8	Amanda Liew (BRU)	35.21	NR
46	3	7	Pilar Shimizu (GUM)	35.25	
47	3	1	Mahfuza Khatun (BAN)	35.32	
48	3	2	Dalia Torrez (NCA)	35.76	
49	2	4	Jamila Lunkuse (UGA)	36.51	
50	3	6	Rachael Tonjor (NGR)	36.70	
51	4	6	Sehar Saleh (KEN)	36.89	
52	2	5	Cheyenne Rova (FIJ)	37.52	
53	2	1	Mariam Foum (TAN)	38.13	
54	2	7	Diala Awad (PLE)	38.25	
55	2	2	Anum Bandey (PAK)	38.28	
56	2	6	Sonia Cege (KEN)	38.60	
57	2	3	Vitiny Hemthon (CAM)	39.03	
58	2	8	Patricia Cani (ALB)	39.82	
59	1	6	Celeste Brown (COK)	40.67	
60	1	2	Angelika Sita Ouedraogo (BUR)	42.51	
61	1	4	Khulan Enkhjargal (MGL)	42.62	
-	1	1	Ophelia Swyne (GHA)	DNS	
-	1	3	Chaemel Morgane Sogbadji (BEN)	DSQ	
-	1	5	Ann-Marie Hepler (MHL)	DSQ	

=== Semifinals ===
Semifinal 1

Rank	Lane	Name	Time	Notes
1	4	Rebecca Soni (USA)	30.00	Q
2	3	Alia Atkinson (JAM)	30.19	Q
3	2	Wang Randi (CHN)	30.44	Q
4	6	Jennie Johansson (SWE)	30.56	
5	5	Jane Trepp (EST)	30.61	
6	1	Amanda Reason (CAN)	30.71	
7	7	Hrafnhildur Lúthersdóttir (ISL)	30.82	
8	8	Katharina Stiberg (NOR)	31.11	

Semifinal 2

Rank	Lane	Name	Time	Notes
1	3	Zhao Jin (CHN)	29.96	Q
2	5	Leiston Pickett (AUS)	29.98	Q
3	4	Yuliya Yefimova (RUS)	30.16	Q
4	2	Dorothea Brandt (GER)	30.39	Q
5	6	Sarah Katsoulis (AUS)	30.46	Q
6	7	Moniek Nijhuis (NED)	30.56	
7	1	Rikke Pedersen (DEN)	30.65	
8	8	Petra Chocova (CZE)	30.98	

=== Final ===
Rank	Lane	Name	Time	Notes
1st place, gold medalist(s)	3	Rebecca Soni (USA)	29.83	
2nd place, silver medalist(s)	5	Leiston Pickett (AUS)	29.84	
3rd place, bronze medalist(s)	4	Zhao Jin (CHN)	29.90	
4	6	Yuliya Yefimova (RUS)	29.99	
5	7	Dorothea Brandt (GER)	30.19	
6	2	Alia Atkinson (JAM)	30.22	
7	1	Wang Randi (CHN)	30.26	
8	8	Sarah Katsoulis (AUS)	30.34	
