= 2010 FINA World Swimming Championships (25 m) – Women's 200 metre breaststroke =

Women's 200m Breaststroke at the 2010 Short Course Worlds
- Dates: 19 December 2010
- Competitors: 41
- Winning time: 2:16.39

Medalists
gold medal	Rebecca Soni	United States
silver medal	Sun Ye	China
bronze medal	Rikke Pedersen	Denmark

The Women's 200 Breaststroke at the 10th FINA World Swimming Championships (25m) was swum on 19 December 2010 in Dubai, United Arab Emirates. 41 swimmers swam in the preliminary heats, with the top-8 advancing to finals that evening.

== Records ==
At the start of the event, the existing world and championship records were as follows.

	Name	Nation	Time	Location	Date
World record	Rebecca Soni	United States	2:14.57	Manchester	18 December 2009
Championship record	Suzaan van Biljon	South Africa	2:18.73	Manchester 2008	13 April 2008

The following records were established during the competition:

Date	Round	Name	Nation	Time	WR	CR
19 December 2010	Heats	Rebecca Soni	United States	2:18.66		CR
19 December 2010	Final	Rebecca Soni	United States	2:16.39		CR

== Results ==
=== Heats ===
Rank	Heat	Lane	Name	Time	Notes
1	5	4	Rebecca Soni (USA)	2:18.66	Q, CR
2	5	5	Sun Ye (CHN)	2:19.77	Q
3	6	4	Rikke Pedersen (DEN)	2:20.89	Q
4	4	4	Rie Kaneto (JPN)	2:21.36	Q
5	6	3	Martha McCabe (CAN)	2:21.45	Q
6	3	5	Alia Atkinson (JAM)	2:21.65	Q
7	5	6	Yulia Yefimova (RUS)	2:22.12	Q
8	1	5	Ji Liping (CHN)	2:22.96	Q
9	4	3	Sarah Katsoulis (AUS)	2:22.98	
10	6	6	Micah Lawrence (USA)	2:23.60	
11	4	6	Moniek Nijhuis (NED)	2:23.92	
12	6	7	Hrafnhildur Lúthersdóttir (ISL)	2:24.15	
13	5	3	Chiara Boggiatto (ITA)	2:24.17	
14	6	5	Joline Höstman (SWE)	2:24.70	
15	4	8	Mina Matsushima (JPN)	2:25.23	
16	4	5	Annamay Pierse (CAN)	2:25.34	
17	6	2	Sara Nordenstam (NOR)	2:26.07	
18	4	2	Agustina de Giovanni (ARG)	2:26.22	
19	5	2	Mireia Belmonte García (ESP)	2:26.53	
20	5	8	Kong Yvette Man Yi (HKG)	2:28.20	
21	6	8	Dilara Buse Gunaydin (TUR)	2:28.71	
22	4	1	Jessica Pengelly (RSA)	2:28.93	
23	5	1	Sarra Lajnef (TUN)	2:31.05	
24	4	7	Caroline Reitshammer (AUT)	2:31.88	
25	3	2	Daniela Victoria (VEN)	2:31.98	
26	3	3	Aurelie Waltzing (LUX)	2:32.19	
27	3	7	Patricia Quevedo (PER)	2:37.87	
28	3	1	Daniela Lindemeier (NAM)	2:38.36	
29	3	8	Danielle Beaubrun (LCA)	2:38.77	
30	2	4	Lei On Kei (MAC)	2:40.04	
31	1	3	Sin Jin Hui (PRK)	2:41.24	
32	2	5	Melinda Sue Micallef (MLT)	2:45.03	
33	2	3	Elodie Poo Cheong (MRI)	2:47.61	
34	2	7	Patricia Cani (ALB)	2:49.54	
35	2	6	Pilar Shimizu (GUM)	2:51.66	
36	2	2	Anum Bandey (PAK)	2:53.52	
37	1	4	Sehar Saleh (KEN)	3:09.53	
–	3	4	Tatiane Sakemi (BRA)	DNS	
–	5	7	Jennie Johansson (SWE)	DNS	
–	3	6	Sara El Bekri (MAR)	DSQ	
–	6	1	Katheryn Anne Meaklim (RSA)	DSQ	

=== Final ===
Rank	Lane	Name	Time	Notes
1st place, gold medalist(s)	4	Rebecca Soni (USA)	2:16.39	CR
2nd place, silver medalist(s)	5	Sun Ye (CHN)	2:18.09	
3rd place, bronze medalist(s)	3	Rikke Pedersen (DEN)	2:18.82	
4	1	Yulia Yefimova (RUS)	2:19.69	
5	2	Martha McCabe (CAN)	2:20.61	
6	8	Ji Liping (CHN)	2:21.05	
7	6	Rie Kaneto (JPN)	2:22.11	
8	7	Alia Atkinson (JAM)	2:25.49	
