= 2010 Pan Pacific Swimming Championships – Women's 200 metre breaststroke =

Women's 200 metre breaststroke at the 2010 Pan Pacific Swimming Championships
- Venue: William Woollett Jr. Aquatics Center
- Dates: August 21, 2010 (heats & finals)
- Competitors: 24 from 7 nations
- Winning time: 2:20.69

Medalists
gold medal	Rebecca Soni	United States
silver medal	Leisel Jones	Australia
bronze medal	Annamay Pierse	Canada

The women's 200 metre breaststroke competition at the 2010 Pan Pacific Swimming Championships took place on August 21 at the William Woollett Jr. Aquatics Center. The last champion was Suzaan van Biljon of South Africa.

This race consisted of four lengths of the pool, all in breaststroke.

== Records ==
Prior to this competition, the existing world and Pan Pacific records were as follows:

World record	Annamay Pierse (CAN)	2:20.12	Rome, Italy	July 30, 2009
Pan Pacific Championships record	Penelope Heyns (RSA)	2:23.64	Sydney, Australia	August 22, 1999

== Results ==
All times are in minutes and seconds.

KEY:	q	Fastest non-qualifiers	Q	Qualified	CR	Championships record	NR	National record	PB	Personal best	SB	Seasonal best

=== Heats ===
The first round was held on August 21, at 10:51.

Rank	Heat	Lane	Name	Nationality	Time	Notes
1	3	4	Rebecca Soni	United States	2:23.97	QA
2	4	2	Amanda Beard	United States	2:25.52	QA
3	4	4	Rie Kaneto	Japan	2:25.80	QA
4	3	6	Micah Lawrence	United States	2:25.90	QA
5	4	3	Sarah Katsoulis	Australia	2:26.01	QA
6	4	5	Annamay Pierse	Canada	2:26.07	QA
7	3	2	Katlin Freeman	United States	2:26.15	QA
8	2	4	Leisel Jones	Australia	2:26.16	QA
9	2	5	Satomi Suzuki	Japan	2:26.60	QB
10	2	3	Fumie Kawanabe	Japan	2:27.27	QB
11	3	3	Martha McCabe	Canada	2:27.47	QB
12	4	6	Tessa Wallace	Australia	2:27.90	QB
13	2	6	Sally Foster	Australia	2:28.33	QB
14	2	7	Chelsey Salli	Canada	2:28.83	QB
15	2	2	Mina Matsushima	Japan	2:29.66	QB
16	3	5	Jeong Darae	South Korea	2:30.17	QB
17	1	4	Jillian Tyler	Canada	2:30.40	
18	4	7	Ashley McGregor	Canada	2:31.95	
19	2	1	Samantha Marshall	Australia	2:32.02	
20	1	5	Ann Chandler	United States	2:32.87	
21	4	1	Tianna Rissling	Canada	2:32.96	
22	3	7	Sarra Lajnef	Tunisia	2:33.42	
23	4	8	Carolina Mussi	Brazil	2:36.34	
24	1	3	Juliana Marin	Brazil	2:41.67	
-	3	1	Tatiane Sakemi	Brazil	DNS	

=== B Final ===
The B final was held on August 21, at 19:16.

Rank	Lane	Name	Nationality	Time	Notes
9	4	Micah Lawrence	United States	2:25.19	
10	5	Fumie Watanabe	Japan	2:27.28	
11	3	Tessa Wallace	Australia	2:27.69	
12	2	Jeong Darae	South Korea	2:27.70	
13	6	Chelsey Salli	Canada	2:28.95	
14	7	Sarra Lajnef	Tunisia	2:34.40	
15	1	Carolina Mussi	Brazil	2:39.76	
16	8	Juliana Marin	Brazil	2:41.54	

=== A Final ===
The A final was held on August 21, at 19:16.

Rank	Lane	Name	Nationality	Time	Notes
1st place, gold medalist(s)	4	Rebecca Soni	United States	2:20.69	CR
2nd place, silver medalist(s)	7	Leisel Jones	Australia	2:23.23	
3rd place, bronze medalist(s)	2	Annamay Pierse	Canada	2:23.65	
4	1	Satomi Suzuki	Japan	2:23.83	
5	5	Amanda Beard	United States	2:24.30	
6	6	Sarah Katsoulis	Australia	2:24.38	
7	3	Rie Kaneto	Japan	2:24.85	
8	8	Martha McCabe	Canada	2:27.33	
