= Swimming at the 2012 Summer Olympics – Women's 200 metre breaststroke =

Women's 200 metre breaststroke at the Games of the XXX Olympiad
- Venue: London Aquatics Centre
- Date: August 1, 2012 (heats & semifinals); August 2, 2012 (final)
- Competitors: 34 from 27 nations
- Winning time: 2:19.59 WR

Medalists
1st place, gold medalist(s)		Rebecca Soni	United States
2nd place, silver medalist(s)		Satomi Suzuki	Japan
3rd place, bronze medalist(s)		Yuliya Yefimova	Russia

The women's 200 metre breaststroke event at the 2012 Summer Olympics took place on 1–2 August 2012 at the London Aquatics Centre in London, United Kingdom.

U.S. swimmer Rebecca Soni cleared a 2:20-barrier in a remarkable world record to defend her Olympic title for the first time in the event's history. Dominating the race from the start, she threw down a stunning time of 2:19.59 to open up a full-body length gap over the rest of the field on the final stretch. Meanwhile, Japan's Satomi Suzuki powered home with silver in a scorching time of 2:20.72 to match an Asian record previously held by Rie Kaneto in 2009. Russia's Yuliya Yefimova, who trained with Soni at the Trojan Swim Club, snatched the bronze medal with an astonishing European record in 2:20.92.

Denmark's Rikke Pedersen fell short of the podium by almost a full second with a fourth-place time in 2:21.65, and was followed in fifth by Canada's Martha McCabe (2:23.16) and sixth by Soni's teammate Micah Lawrence (2:23.27). South Africa's Suzaan van Biljon got off to a flying start in the first length, but dropped back to seventh in 2:23.72, while Australia's Sally Foster rounded out the field to eighth in 2:26.00.

Before the breakthrough finale, Soni scorched the field with a world-record time in 2:20.00 to pick up a top seed in the semifinals, slicing 0.12 seconds off the standard set by Canada's Annamay Pierse in a since-banned high tech bodysuit from the 2009 World Championships.

Other notable swimmers missed the final roster featuring Serbia's Nađa Higl, the 2009 world champion; Norway's Sara Nordenstam, the defending bronze medalist; and Jamaica's Alia Atkinson, fourth-place finalist in the 100 m breaststroke.

== Records ==
Prior to this competition, the existing world and Olympic records were as follows.

World record	Annamay Pierse (CAN)	2:20.12	Rome, Italy	30 July 2009
Olympic record	Rebecca Soni (USA)	2:20.22	Beijing, China	15 August 2008

The following records were established during the competition:

Date	Round	Name	Nationality	Time	Record
August 1	Semifinal 2	Rebecca Soni	United States	2:20.00	WR
August 2	Final	Rebecca Soni	United States	2:19.59	WR

== Results ==
=== Heats ===
Rank	Heat	Lane	Name	Nationality	Time	Notes
1	5	4	Rebecca Soni	United States	2:21.40	Q
2	5	6	Rikke Pedersen	Denmark	2:22.69	Q, NR
3	3	4	Satomi Suzuki	Japan	2:23.22	Q
4	5	5	Micah Lawrence	United States	2:24.50	Q
5	5	3	Anastasia Chaun	Russia	2:25.39	Q
6	4	1	Joline Höstman	Sweden	2:25.44	Q
7	3	3	Ji Liping	China	2:25.76	Q
7	3	1	Back Su-yeon	South Korea	2:25.76	Q
9	3	2	Suzaan van Biljon	South Africa	2:25.94	Q
10	3	6	Sally Foster	Australia	2:26.04	Q
11	3	7	Sara El Bekri	Morocco	2:26.05	Q, NR
12	4	5	Kanako Watanabe	Japan	2:26.38	Q
13	4	6	Martha McCabe	Canada	2:26.39	Q
14	4	4	Yuliya Yefimova	Russia	2:26.83	Q
14	4	7	Jeong Da-rae	South Korea	2:26.83	Q
16	5	1	Tessa Wallace	Australia	2:26.94	Q
17	2	5	Ganna Dzerkal	Ukraine	2:27.09	NR
18	4	8	Stacey Tadd	Great Britain	2:27.18	
19	5	7	Fanny Lecluyse	Belgium	2:27.30	
20	5	2	Marina Garcia Urzainqui	Spain	2:27.57	
21	3	5	Tera van Beilen	Canada	2:27.70	
22	5	8	Chiara Boggiatto	Italy	2:27.74	
23	3	8	Sara Nordenstam	Norway	2:27.90	
24	4	3	Sun Ye	China	2:27.94	
25	4	2	Nađa Higl	Serbia	2:28.38	
26	2	6	Martina Moravčíková	Czech Republic	2:28.54	
27	1	5	Alia Atkinson	Jamaica	2:28.77	NR
28	2	4	Hrafnhildur Lúthersdóttir	Iceland	2:29.60	
29	1	4	Anna Sztankovics	Hungary	2:29.67	
30	2	7	Dilara Buse Günaydin	Turkey	2:30.64	
31	2	1	Sarra Lajnef	Tunisia	2:31.15	
32	2	2	Jenna Laukkanen	Finland	2:31.23	
33	2	3	Tanja Šmid	Slovenia	2:32.19	
34	1	3	Dariya Talanova	Kyrgyzstan	2:38.01	

=== Semifinals ===
==== Semifinal 1 ====
Rank	Lane	Name	Nationality	Time	Notes
1	4	Rikke Pedersen	Denmark	2:22.23	Q, NR
2	1	Yuliya Yefimova	Russia	2:23.02	Q
3	5	Micah Lawrence	United States	2:23.39	Q
4	2	Sally Foster	Australia	2:24.46	Q
5	6	Back Su-Yeon	South Korea	2:24.67	
6	3	Joline Höstman	Sweden	2:24.77	
7	7	Kanako Watanabe	Japan	2:27.32	
8	8	Tessa Wallace	Australia	2:27.38	

==== Semifinal 2 ====
Rank	Lane	Name	Nationality	Time	Notes
1	4	Rebecca Soni	United States	2:20.00	Q, WR
2	5	Satomi Suzuki	Japan	2:22.40	Q
3	2	Suzaan van Biljon	South Africa	2:23.21	Q, AF
4	1	Martha McCabe	Canada	2:24.09	Q
5	7	Sara El Bekri	Morocco	2:25.86	NR
6	3	Anastasia Chaun	Russia	2:26.08	
7	6	Ji Liping	China	2:27.26	
8	8	Jeong Da-Rae	South Korea	2:28.74	

=== Final ===
Rank	Lane	Name	Nationality	Time	Notes
1st place, gold medalist(s)	4	Rebecca Soni	United States	2:19.59	WR
2nd place, silver medalist(s)	3	Satomi Suzuki	Japan	2:20.72	=AS
3rd place, bronze medalist(s)	6	Yuliya Yefimova	Russia	2:20.92	ER
4	5	Rikke Pedersen	Denmark	2:21.65	NR
5	1	Martha McCabe	Canada	2:23.16	
6	7	Micah Lawrence	United States	2:23.27	
7	2	Suzaan van Biljon	South Africa	2:23.72	
8	8	Sally Foster	Australia	2:26.00	
