= Swimming at the 2011 World Aquatics Championships – Women's 200 metre breaststroke =

Women's 200 metre breaststroke at the 2011 World Aquatics Championships
- Dates: July 28, 2011 (heats and semifinals); July 29, 2011 (final)
- Competitors: 38 from 31 nations
- Winning time: 2:21.47

Medalists
gold medal	Rebecca Soni	United States
silver medal	Yuliya Yefimova	Russia
bronze medal	Martha McCabe	Canada

The women's 200 metre breaststroke competition of the swimming events at the 2011 World Aquatics Championships was held on July 28 with the heats and the semifinals and July 29 with the final.

== Records ==
Prior to the competition, the existing world and championship records were as follows.

	Name	Nation	Time	Location	Date
World record Championship record	Annamay Pierse	Canada	2:20.12	Rome	July 30, 2009

== Results ==
=== Heats ===
38 swimmers participated in 5 heats.

Rank	Heat	Lane	Name	Nationality	Time	Notes
1	5	4	Rebecca Soni	United States	2:23.30	Q
2	3	6	Rikke Pedersen	Denmark	2:25.86	Q
3	5	5	Yuliya Yefimova	Russia	2:25.98	Q
4	5	3	Amanda Beard	United States	2:26.73	Q
5	5	7	Marina García Urzainqui	Spain	2:26.96	Q
6	5	6	Sally Foster	Australia	2:27.07	Q
7	4	4	Annamay Pierse	Canada	2:27.14	Q
8	3	3	Martha McCabe	Canada	2:27.16	Q
9	4	5	Sun Ye	China	2:27.17	Q
10	4	6	Rie Kaneto	Japan	2:27.17	Q
11	5	1	Nađa Higl	Serbia	2:27.39	Q
12	4	8	Back Su-Yeon	South Korea	2:27.43	Q
13	3	2	Sara El Bekri	Morocco	2:27.48	Q
14	4	1	Fanny Lecluyse	Belgium	2:27.67	Q
15	3	7	Chiara Boggiatto	Italy	2:27.84	Q
16	3	1	Stacey Tadd	Great Britain	2:27.88	Q
17	3	5	Ji Liping	China	2:27.91	
18	3	4	Satomi Suzuki	Japan	2:27.98	
19	5	2	Jeong Darae	South Korea	2:28.14	
20	5	8	Molly Renshaw	Great Britain	2:28.35	
21	4	3	Sara Nordenstam	Norway	2:28.88	
21	4	2	Joline Höstman	Sweden	2:28.88	
23	4	7	Rebecca Kemp	Australia	2:29.82	
24	2	4	Jenna Laukkanen	Finland	2:30.51	
25	2	3	Martina Moravčíková	Czech Republic	2:31.46	
26	3	8	Tanja Smid	Slovenia	2:32.26	
27	2	6	Raminta Dvariskyte	Lithuania	2:33.79	
28	2	2	Evghenia Tanasienco	Moldova	2:34.00	NR
29	2	5	Tessa Brouwer	Netherlands	2:34.93	
30	2	7	Talanova Daria	Kyrgyzstan	2:38.07	
31	1	5	Lei On Kei	Macau	2:41.62	
32	1	6	Matelita Buadromo	Fiji	2:44.01	
33	2	8	Maria Coy	Guatemala	2:45.32	
34	2	1	Nibal Yamout	Lebanon	2:45.35	
35	1	3	Ana Maria Castellanos	Honduras	2:45.63	
36	1	4	Jessica Stephenson	Guyana	2:46.28	
37	1	2	Daniela Lindemeier	Namibia	2:47.56	
38	1	2	Anum Bandey	Pakistan	2:58.85	

=== Semifinals ===
The semifinals were held at 18:20.

==== Semifinals 1 ====
Rank	Lane	Name	Nationality	Time	Notes
1	4	Rikke Pedersen	Denmark	2:24.80	Q
2	6	Martha McCabe	Canada	2:24.86	Q
3	2	Rie Kaneto	Japan	2:25.41	Q
4	1	Fanny Lecluyse	Belgium	2:25.92	
5	5	Amanda Beard	United States	2:25.99	
6	3	Sally Foster	Australia	2:26.43	
7	7	Back Su-Yeon	South Korea	2:26.61	
8	8	Stacey Tadd	Great Britain	2:26.73	

==== Semifinals 2 ====
Rank	Lane	Name	Nationality	Time	Notes
1	4	Rebecca Soni	United States	2:21.03	Q
2	5	Yuliya Yefimova	Russia	2:23.66	Q
3	2	Sun Ye	China	2:24.59	Q
4	6	Annamay Pierse	Canada	2:24.73	Q
5	7	Nađa Higl	Serbia	2:25.56	Q
6	3	Marina García Urzainqui	Spain	2:25.79	
7	1	Sara El Bekri	Morocco	2:26.74	
8	8	Chiara Boggiatto	Italy	2:28.14	

=== Final ===
The final was held at 18:52.

Rank	Lane	Name	Nationality	Time	Notes
1st place, gold medalist(s)	4	Rebecca Soni	United States	2:21.47	
2nd place, silver medalist(s)	5	Yuliya Yefimova	Russia	2:22.22	NR
3rd place, bronze medalist(s)	7	Martha McCabe	Canada	2:24.81	
4	3	Sun Ye	China	2:25.09	
5	1	Rie Kaneto	Japan	2:25.36	
6	8	Nađa Higl	Serbia	2:25.93	
7	2	Rikke Pedersen	Denmark	2:26.56	
8	6	Annamay Pierse	Canada	2:27.00	
