= 2010 FINA World Swimming Championships (25 m) – Women's 4 × 100 metre medley relay =

Women's 4 × 100 m Medley Relay at the 2010 Short Course Worlds
- Dates: 17 December 2010
- Teams: 21
- Winning time: 3:48.29

Medalists
gold medal	China
silver medal	USA
bronze medal	Australia

The Women's 4 × 100 metre Medley Relay at the 10th FINA World Swimming Championships (25m) was swum on 17 December 2010 in Dubai, United Arab Emirates. 21 nations swam in the preliminary heats, with the top-8 advancing to swim again in the final.

== Records ==
Prior to the competition, the existing world and championship records were as follows.

	Name	Nation	Time	Location	Date
World record	Margaret Hoelzer (57.47); Jessica Hardy (1:03.58); Dana Vollmer (54.37); Amanda Weir (52.55)	United States	3:47.97	Manchester	18 December 2009
Championship record	Margaret Hoelzer (58.79); Jessica Hardy (1:03.98); Rachel Komisarz (55.93); Kara Denby (52.66)	United States	3:51.36	Manchester	11 April 2008

The following records were established during the competition:

Date	Round	Name	Nation	Time	WR	CR
17 December 2010	Heats	Gao Chang (56.41); Zhao Jin (1:04.72); Guo Fan (57.44); Li Zhesi (52.12)	China	3:50.69		CR
17 December 2010	Final	Zhao Jing (56.52); Zhao Jin (1:04.20); Liu Zige (55.80); Tang Yi (51.77)	China	3:48.29		CR

== Results ==
=== Heats ===
Rank	Heat	Lane	Nation	Name	Time	Notes
1	1	2	China	Gao Chang (56.41); Zhao Jin (1:04.72); Guo Fan (57.44); Li Zhesi (52.12)	3:50.69	Q, CR
2	2	4	Australia	Rachel Goh (58.36); Sarah Katsoulis (1:05.50); Felicity Galvez (56.22); Emma McKeon (52.65)	3:52.73	Q
3	3	4	United States	Missy Franklin (58.38); Jessica Hardy (1:05.30); Christine Magnuson (56.44); Amanda Weir (53.54)	3:53.66	Q
4	1	4	Sweden	Michelle Coleman (59.58); Jennie Johansson (1:04.46); Petra Granlund (57.20); Claire Hedenskog (53.56)	3:54.80	Q
5	2	3	Canada	Sinead Russell (58.75); Martha McCabe (1:06.10); Katerine Savard (58.82); Geneviève Saumur (53.15)	3:56.82	Q
6	3	3	Russia	Kseniya Moskvina (58.86); Daria Deyeva (1:05.67); Svetlana Fedulova (59.28); Margarita Nesterova (53.30)	3:57.11	Q
7	3	7	Italy	Elena Gemo (59.04); Chiara Boggiatto (1:07.63); Caterina Giacchetti (59.03); Chiara Luccetti (53.57)	3:59.27	Q
8	2	5	Brazil	Fabíola Molina (58.48); Tatiane Sakemi (1:08.46); Daniele de Jesus (59.54); Tatiana Lemos (53.44)	3:59.92	Q
9	3	6	South Africa	Chanelle van Wyk (59.26); Katheryn Anne Meaklim (1:08.73); Mandy Loots (58.76); Leone Vorster (54.00)	4:00.75	
10	3	1	Norway	Katharina Stiberg (1:01.32); Sara Nordenstam (1:08.31); Ingvild Snildal (57.79); Cecilie Waage Johannessen (53.73)	4:01.15	
11	3	5	Japan	Miyuki Takemura (58.84); Rie Kaneto (1:08.41); Hiroko Sugino (58.22); Maiko Fujino (56.97)	4:02.44	
12	1	1	Turkey	Hazal Sarikaya (1:01.37); Dilara Buse Gunaydin (1:08.96); Iris Rosenberger (59.83); Burcu Dolunay (55.71)	4:05.87	
13	1	6	Chinese Taipei	Chen Ting (1:01.77); Chen I-Chuan (1:09.90); Cheng Wan-Jung (59.50); Ting Sheng-Yo (58.21)	4:09.38	
14	2	6	Venezuela	Jeserik Pinto (1:03.33); Daniela Victoria (1:11.10); Elimar Barrios (1:01.97); Ximena Vilar (57.08)	4:13.48	
15	2	1	Peru	Massie Milagros Carrillo (1:04.47); Patricia Quevedo (1:14.69); Oriele Alejandra Espinoza (1:02.49); Andrea Cedrón (59.98)	4:21.63	
16	2	7	Malta	Nicola Muscat (1:06.12); Melinda Sue Micallef (1:15.28); Davina Mangion (1:07.88); Talisa Pace (59.39)	4:28.67	
17	3	2	Macau	Vong Erica Man Wai (1:07.17); Lei On Kei (1:16.38); Ma Cheok Mei (1:05.18); Tan Chi Yan (1:01.50)	4:30.23	
–	1	3	Denmark	Pernille Jessing Larsen (1:01.76); Rikke Møller Pedersen; Jeanette Ottesen; Pernille Blume	DSQ	
–	1	5	Netherlands		DNS	
–	1	7	Nigeria		DNS	
–	2	2	Kenya		DNS	

=== Final ===
Rank	Lane	Nation	Name	Time	Notes
1st place, gold medalist(s)	4	China	Zhao Jing (56.52); Zhao Jin (1:04.20); Liu Zige (55.80); Tang Yi (51.77)	3:48.29	CR
2nd place, silver medalist(s)	3	United States	Natalie Coughlin (56.83); Rebecca Soni (1:03.73); Dana Vollmer (55.62); Jessica Hardy (52.18)	3:48.36	
3rd place, bronze medalist(s)	5	Australia	Rachel Goh (57.39); Leisel Jones (1:03.76); Felicity Galvez (55.56); Marieke Guehrer (52.17)	3:48.88	
4	7	Russia	Anastasia Zuyeva (57.81); Yuliya Yefimova (1:04.23); Veronika Popova (57.79); Margarita Nesterova (53.25)	3:53.08	
5	6	Sweden	Petra Granlund (59.29); Joline Höstman (1:06.07); Therese Alshammar (55.88); Sarah Sjöström (52.74)	3:53.98	
6	2	Canada	Sinead Russell (58.47); Martha McCabe (1:07.00); Audrey Lacroix (58.25); Victoria Poon (52.85)	3:56.57	
7	1	Italy	Elena Gemo (58.65); Chiara Boggiatto (1:07.22); Caterina Giacchetti (58.30); Chiara Luccetti (53.41)	3:57.58	
8	8	Brazil	Fabíola Molina (58.45); Tatiane Sakemi (1:08.43); Daniele de Jesus (59.39); Tatiana Lemos (53.18)	3:59.45	
