= Swimming at the 2011 World Aquatics Championships – Women's 100 metre breaststroke =

Women's 100 metre breaststroke at the 2011 World Aquatics Championships
- Dates: July 25, 2011 (heats and semifinals); July 26, 2011 (final)
- Competitors: 46 from 39 nations
- Winning time: 1:05.05

Medalists
| gold medal | Rebecca Soni | United States |
| silver medal | Leisel Jones | Australia |
| bronze medal | Ji Liping | China |

The women's 100 metre breaststroke competition of the swimming events at the 2011 World Aquatics Championships was held on July 25 with the preliminary round and the semifinals and July 26 with the final.

== Records ==
Prior to the competition, the existing world and championship records were as follows.

| | Name | Nation | Time | Location | Date |
|---|---|---|---|---|---|
| World record | Jessica Hardy | United States | 1:04.45 | Federal Way | August 7, 2009 |
| Championship record | Rebecca Soni | United States | 1:04.84 | Rome | July 27, 2009 |

== Results ==
=== Heats ===
46 swimmers participated in 6 heats, qualified swimmers are listed:

| Rank | Heat | Lane | Name | Nationality | Time | Notes |
|---|---|---|---|---|---|---|
| 1 | 6 | 4 | Rebecca Soni | United States | 1:05.54 | Q |
| 2 | 6 | 5 | Ji Liping | China | 1:07.10 | Q |
| 3 | 6 | 7 | Sarah Poewe | Germany | 1:07.38 | Q |
| 4 | 4 | 5 | Satomi Suzuki | Japan | 1:07.39 | Q |
| 5 | 5 | 6 | Jillian Tyler | Canada | 1:07.67 | Q |
| 6 | 5 | 4 | Leisel Jones | Australia | 1:07.72 | Q |
| 7 | 5 | 3 | Rikke Pedersen | Denmark | 1:07.80 | Q |
| 7 | 6 | 3 | Jennie Johansson | Sweden | 1:07.80 | Q |
| 9 | 4 | 4 | Yuliya Yefimova | Russia | 1:07.81 | Q |
| 10 | 4 | 3 | Sun Ye | China | 1:07.96 | Q |
| 11 | 5 | 5 | Leiston Pickett | Australia | 1:08.06 | Q |
| 12 | 5 | 2 | Moniek Nijhuis | Netherlands | 1:08.16 | Q |
| 13 | 4 | 2 | Marina Garcia Urzainque | Spain | 1:08.42 | Q |
| 14 | 6 | 6 | Amanda Beard | United States | 1:08.51 | Q |
| 15 | 4 | 1 | Petra Chocova | Czech Republic | 1:08.58 | Q |
| 16 | 4 | 6 | Joline Höstman | Sweden | 1:08.63 | Q |
| 17 | 6 | 1 | Sara El Bekri | Morocco | 1:08.96 | |
| 18 | 3 | 4 | Stacey Tadd | Great Britain | 1:09.08 | |
| 19 | 5 | 7 | Daria Deeva | Russia | 1:09.12 | |
| 20 | 4 | 8 | Kim Janssens | Belgium | 1:09.25 | |
| 21 | 6 | 2 | Tianna Rissling | Canada | 1:09.29 | |
| 22 | 3 | 2 | Jenna Laukkanen | Finland | 1:09.39 | NR |
| 23 | 5 | 1 | Chiara Boggiatto | Italy | 1:09.50 | |
| 24 | 4 | 7 | Rie Kaneto | Japan | 1:09.56 | |
| 25 | 3 | 6 | Suzaan van Biljon | South Africa | 1:09.64 | |
| 26 | 3 | 3 | Hrafnhildur Lúthersdóttir | Iceland | 1:09.82 | NR |
| 27 | 3 | 8 | Sycerika McMahon | Ireland | 1:09.91 | |
| 28 | 5 | 8 | Back Su-Yeon | South Korea | 1:10.00 | |
| 29 | 2 | 3 | Evghenia Tanasienco | Moldova | 1:11.03 | |
| 30 | 3 | 5 | Stephanie Spahn | Switzerland | 1:11.13 | |
| 31 | 6 | 8 | Sara Nordenstam | Norway | 1:11.33 | |
| 32 | 2 | 4 | Danielle Beaubrun | Saint Lucia | 1:11.34 | NR |
| 33 | 3 | 7 | Tanja Smid | Slovenia | 1:12.12 | |
| 34 | 2 | 5 | Anastasia Christoforou | Cyprus | 1:13.15 | |
| 35 | 2 | 6 | Patricia Casellas | Puerto Rico | 1:13.16 | NR |
| 36 | 3 | 1 | Carolina Mussi | Brazil | 1:13.66 | |
| 37 | 2 | 1 | Ivana Ninkovic | Bosnia and Herzegovina | 1:14.32 | NR |
| 38 | 2 | 8 | Matelita Buadromo | Fiji | 1:14.70 | |
| 39 | 2 | 2 | Daniela Lindemeier | Namibia | 1:15.64 | |
| 40 | 2 | 7 | Jessica Stephenson | Guyana | 1:16.54 | |
| 41 | 1 | 3 | Pilar Shimizu | Guam | 1:21.19 | |
| 42 | 1 | 5 | Oksana Hatamkhanova | Azerbaijan | 1:22.66 | |
| 43 | 1 | 6 | Mariana Henriques | Angola | 1:26.27 | |
| 44 | 1 | 4 | Ouyngerel Hantumur | Mongolia | 1:28.86 | |
| 45 | 1 | 2 | Antoinette Guedia Mouafo | Cameroon | 1:30.56 | |
| 46 | 1 | 7 | Dede Camara | Guinea | 1:40.16 | |

=== Semifinals ===
The semifinals were held at 18:20.

==== Semifinal 1 ====
| Rank | Lane | Name | Nationality | Time | Notes |
|---|---|---|---|---|---|
| 1 | 3 | Leisel Jones | Australia | 1:06.66 | Q |
| 2 | 4 | Ji Liping | China | 1:07.09 | Q |
| 3 | 2 | Sun Ye | China | 1:07.25 | Q |
| 4 | 7 | Moniek Nijhuis | Netherlands | 1:07.60 | Q |
| 5 | 5 | Satomi Suzuki | Japan | 1:07.68 | |
| 6 | 6 | Jennie Johansson | Sweden | 1:08.02 | |
| 7 | 8 | Joline Höstman | Sweden | 1:08.55 | |
| 8 | 1 | Amanda Beard | United States | 1:08.64 | |

==== Semifinal 2 ====
| Rank | Lane | Name | Nationality | Time | Notes |
|---|---|---|---|---|---|
| 1 | 4 | Rebecca Soni | United States | 1:04.91 | Q |
| 2 | 6 | Rikke Pedersen | Denmark | 1:07.13 | Q |
| 3 | 3 | Jillian Tyler | Canada | 1:07.28 | Q |
| 4 | 2 | Yuliya Yefimova | Russia | 1:07.53 | Q |
| 5 | 7 | Leiston Pickett | Australia | 1:07.87 | |
| 6 | 5 | Sarah Poewe | Germany | 1:08.38 | |
| 7 | 8 | Petra Chocova | Czech Republic | 1:08.40 | NR |
| 8 | 1 | Marina Garcia Urzainque | Spain | 1:08.81 | |

=== Final ===
The final was held at 19:48.

| Rank | Lane | Name | Nationality | Time | Notes |
|---|---|---|---|---|---|
| 1st place, gold medalist(s) | 4 | Rebecca Soni | United States | 1:05.05 | |
| 2nd place, silver medalist(s) | 5 | Leisel Jones | Australia | 1:06.25 | |
| 3rd place, bronze medalist(s) | 3 | Ji Liping | China | 1:06.52 | |
| 4 | 1 | Yuliya Yefimova | Russia | 1:06.56 | |
| 5 | 2 | Sun Ye | China | 1:07.08 | |
| 6 | 6 | Rikke Pedersen | Denmark | 1:07.28 | |
| 7 | 7 | Jillian Tyler | Canada | 1:07.64 | |
| 8 | 8 | Moniek Nijhuis | Netherlands | 1:07.97 | |
