= 2006 Pan Pacific Swimming Championships – Women's 200 metre breaststroke =

Women's 200 metre backstroke at the 2006 Pan Pacific Swimming Championships
- Venue: Saanich Commonwealth Place
- Dates: August 20, 2006 (heats & finals)
- Competitors: 20 from 9 nations
- Winning time: 2:26.36

Medalists
gold medal	Suzaan van Biljon	South Africa
silver medal	Asami Kitagawa	Japan
bronze medal	Jung Seul-Ki	South Korea

The women's 200 metre breaststroke competition at the 2006 Pan Pacific Swimming Championships took place on August 20 at the Saanich Commonwealth Place. The last champion was Amanda Beard of US.

This race consisted of four lengths of the pool, all in breaststroke.

== Records ==
Prior to this competition, the existing world and Pan Pacific records were as follows:

World record	Leisel Jones (AUS)	2:20.54	Melbourne, Australia	February 1, 2006
Pan Pacific Championships record	Penny Heyns (RSA)	2:23.64	Sydney, Australia	August 27, 1999

== Results ==
All times are in minutes and seconds.

KEY:	q	Fastest non-qualifiers	Q	Qualified	CR	Championships record	NR	National record	PB	Personal best	SB	Seasonal best

=== Heats ===
The first round was held on August 20, at 10:38.

Rank	Heat	Lane	Name	Nationality	Time	Notes
1	3	4	Suzaan Van Biljon	South Africa	2:27.76	QA
2	1	4	Asami Kitagawa	Japan	2:28.48	QA
3	2	3	Megan Jendrick	United States	2:28.91	QA
4	2	5	Kristen Caverly	United States	2:28.98	QA
5	2	4	Tara Kirk	United States	2:29.45	QA
6	3	5	Jung Seul-Ki	South Korea	2:29.51	QA
7	3	3	Sarah Katsoulis	Australia	2:31.10	QA
8	3	6	Back Su-Yeon	South Korea	2:31.48	QA
9	3	7	Chelsey Salli	Canada	2:31.57	QB
10	1	3	Sun Ye	China	2:32.64	QB
11	2	6	Siow Yi Ting	Malaysia	2:33.01	QB
11	2	2	Jillian Tyler	Canada	2:33.01	QB
13	1	6	Kathleen Stoody	Canada	2:33.70	QB
14	1	5	Yoshimi Miwa	Japan	2:34.96	QB
15	3	1	Lisa Blackburn	Canada	2:35.61	QB
16	1	7	Jennifer Reilly	Australia	2:37.20	QB
17	2	1	Helen Pitchik	Canada	2:37.22	
18	2	7	Jessica Hardy	United States	2:37.43	
19	1	1	Annabelle Carey	New Zealand	2:38.24	
20	1	2	Chen Huijia	China	2:40.39	
-	3	2	Ariana Kukors	United States	DSQ	

=== B Final ===
The B final was held on August 20, at 19:27.

Rank	Lane	Name	Nationality	Time	Notes
9	4	Tara Kirk	United States	2:30.90	
10	5	Sun Ye	China	2:31.82	
11	3	Siow Yi Ting	Malaysia	2:32.43	
12	8	Chen Huijia	China	2:33.29	
13	6	Kathleen Stoody	Canada	2:33.57	
14	7	Lisa Blackburn	Canada	2:34.52	
15	2	Yoshimi Miwa	Japan	2:34.91	
16	1	Jennifer Reilly	Australia	2:35.22	

=== A Final ===
The A final was held on August 20, at 19:27.

Rank	Lane	Name	Nationality	Time	Notes
1st place, gold medalist(s)	4	Suzaan Van Biljon	South Africa	2:26.36	
2nd place, silver medalist(s)	5	Asami Kitagawa	Japan	2:27.07	
3rd place, bronze medalist(s)	2	Jung Seul-Ki	South Korea	2:27.09	
4	3	Megan Jendrick	United States	2:27.98	
5	1	Back Su-Yeon	South Korea	2:28.62	
6	6	Kristen Caverly	United States	2:28.66	
7	7	Sarah Katsoulis	Australia	2:29.08	
8	8	Chelsey Salli	Canada	2:32.19	
