= Kasey Carlson =

American swimmer

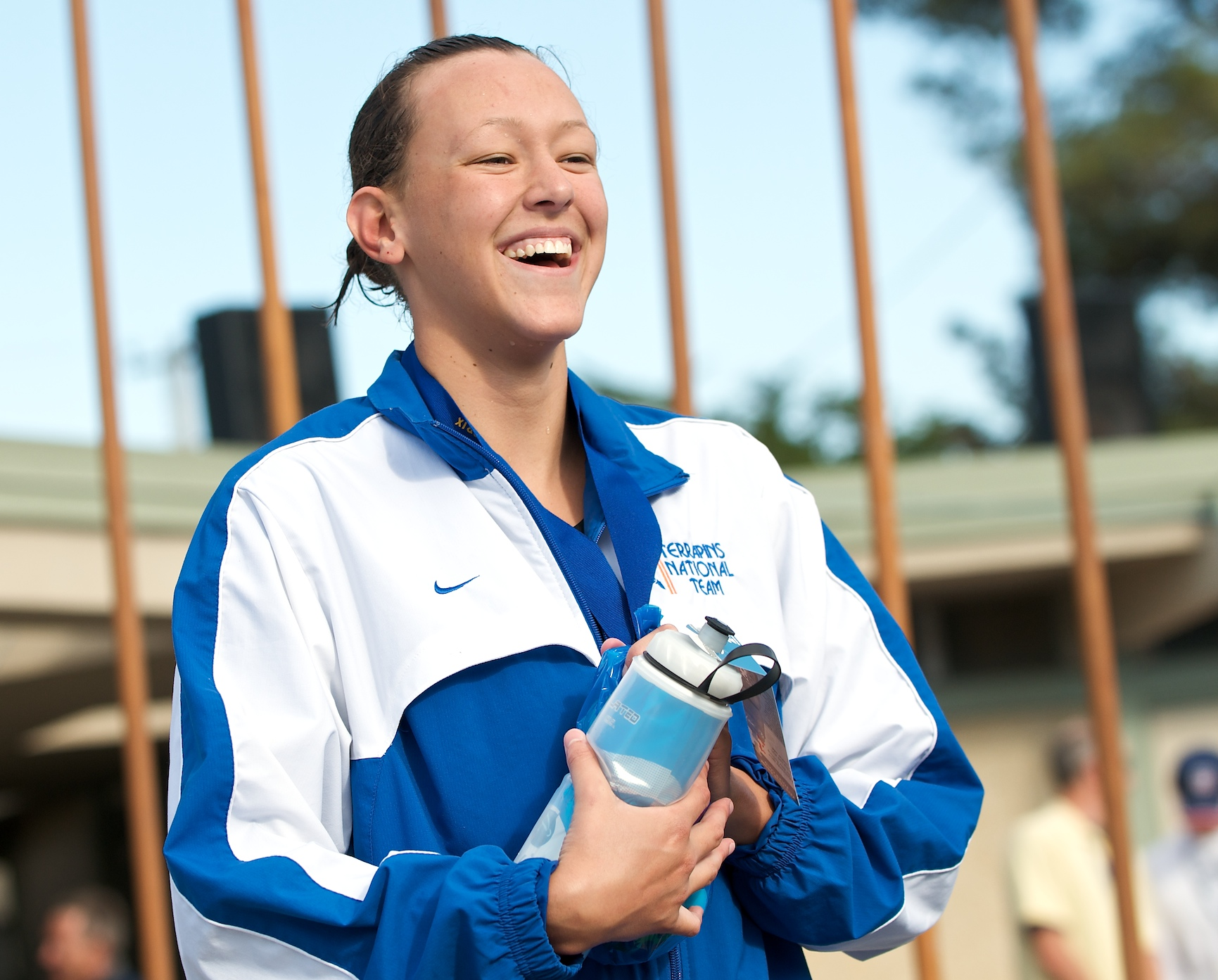

Personal information
- National team: United States
- Born: November 26, 1991 (age 34)
- Occupation: Social Media Director
- Height: 6 ft 1 in (185 cm)

Sport
- Sport: Swimming
- Events: 50, 100 freestyle (College); 50, 100 breaststroke (International)
- Strokes: Breaststroke
- Club: Concord Terrapins Swim Club; Walnut Creek Aquabears
- College team: University of Southern Cal. (USC)
- Coach: Mike Heaney (Aquabears); Dave Salo (USC)
Medal record
Women's swimming
Representing the United States
World Championships (LC)
Bronze medal – third place	2009 Rome	100 m breaststroke

Kasey Carlson (born November 26, 1991) is an American competition swimmer from Walnut Creek, California who competed for the University of Southern California where she earned All American honors eleven times. She won the bronze medal at the 2009 FINA World Championships in Rome in the 100 m breaststroke. Kasey has since worked as a social media director the Las Vegas Raiders and for golf equipment manufacturers Scotty Cameron and Acushnet.

== Early life and swimming ==
Kasey Carlson was born November 26, 1991. She grew up in Walnut Creek California attended and swam for Las Lomas High School. From an athletic family, her mother was a former national level swimmer who competed for Florida State, and her sister, Taylor, swam for the University of California Los Angeles. In club swimming, she swam for Mike Heaney with the Walnut Creek Aquabears, and had formerly swam for the Concord Terrapins Swim team in high school. While attending Las Lomas High School, she was the recipient of the honor of being named the 2008-9 Athlete of the Year from the Contra Costa Times newspaper, and also earned the honor of being named the Swimmer of the Year for 2008-2010.

=== High School achievements ===
In the 100-yard breaststroke she held a national age group record for high schools, and was a National Age Group record holder for the 100-yard breaststroke with a time of 1:05.75. Around the age of 18, she was accepted to the U.S. National team after securing a second place finish at the 2009 National Championships in the 100 breaststroke. On June 19, 2010, she won the 100-meter breaststroke at the Santa Clara Grand Prix Swimming Championship. During her High School career, she set eight titles in individual events in the North Coast Section Conference for California High Schools including records in the 100-yard breaststroke, and 50-yard freestyle.

== University of Southern California ==
Stanford attended and swam for the University of Southern California from around 2010-2014 where she was managed by Head Coach Dave Salo, who coached both the men's and women's teams, and began coaching at USC in 2006. Recognized for his achievements, in 2010, Salo was inducted into the American Swimming Coaches Association Hall of Fame. During her Stanford career, Carlson earned All American honors eleven times. By her Senior year, she was a PAC-10 Conference Champion in the 100-yard breaststroke and held an all-time USC record in the 100 and 50-yard freestyle events. Under Salo, in 2014 at the NCAA championships, the women's team placed fifth. In that year, Karlson had three finishes in the top six, and had a second place finish in the 50-yard freestyle. In 2014, Carlson won a 50-freestyle first place at the PAC-12 Conference championships, and finished in the top four in three events.

== Competition highlights ==
=== US National Championships ===
As noted earlier, in an important victory at the 2009 US National Championships and World Championship Trials, Carlson placed second to Rebecca Soni in the 100 m breaststroke with a time of 1:06.54, earning a place to compete at the 2009 World Aquatics Championships in Rome.

=== 2009 World Championships, Rome ===
At the Swimming at the 2009 World Aquatics Championships, in Rome, Carlson won the bronze medal in the 100 m breaststroke with a time of 1:05.75. In the preliminaries of the 50 m breaststroke, Carlson broke the American record with a time of 30.34. Carlson advanced to the semi-final and placed sixth with a time of 30.65. Carlson's day-old American record was broken by Soni, who took the silver medal in 30.11.

=== Honors ===
For her High School swimming achievements, Carlson was voted a Bay Area News Group Swimmer of the Year, for three straight years from 2008-2010.

=== Careers ===
Kasey was the Social Media Director for the Las Vegas Raiders for several years, and was a Social Media director for Scotty Cameron, a golf club manufacturer. She has also worked for golf manufacturer Acushnet.
