= Liliana Guiscardo =

Argentine swimmer (born 1981)

Personal information
- Full name: Liliana Eugenia Guiscardo
- National team: Argentina
- Born: 21 July 1981 (age 45) Buenos Aires, Argentina
- Height: 1.77 m (5 ft 10 in)
- Weight: 70 kg (154 lb)

Sport
- Sport: Swimming
- Strokes: Breaststroke

Liliana Eugenia Guiscardo (born 21 July 1981 in Buenos Aires) is an Argentine swimmer, who specialized in breaststroke events. She represented her nation Argentina at the 2008 Summer Olympics, finishing among the top 40 swimmers in the 100 m breaststroke.

Guiscardo competed for Argentina in the women's 100 m breaststroke at the 2008 Summer Olympics in Beijing. Leading up to the Games, she crushed the Argentine record time of 1:10.38 to satisfy the FINA B-standard (1:11.43) at the Maria Lenk Trophy in Rio de Janeiro, Brazil. Swimming as the fastest entrant in heat four, Guiscardo held off a quick-charging Brazilian Tatiane Sakemi throughout the race to keep the fourth spot by 0.32 of a second in 1:11.43. Guiscardo failed to advance into the semifinals, as she placed thirty-seventh overall out of forty-nine swimmers in the prelims.
