= Rebecca Soni =

American swimmer

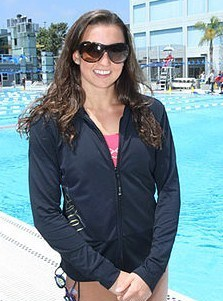

Personal information
- Nickname: "Reb"
- National team: United States
- Born: March 18, 1987 (age 39) Freehold Borough, New Jersey, U.S.
- Height: 5 ft 8 in (173 cm)
- Weight: 134 lb (61 kg)
- Website: RebSoni.com

Sport
- Sport: Swimming
- Strokes: Breaststroke
- Club: Scarlet Aquatics; Trojan Swim Club
- College team: University of Southern California
- Coach: Tom Speedling (Scarlet Aquatics); Dave Salo (USC)
Medal record
Women's swimming
Representing United States
Event	1st	2nd	3rd
Olympic Games	3	3	0
World Championships (LC)	4	1	1
World Championships (SC)	3	1	0
Pan Pacific Championships	3	0	0
Universiade	1	2	0
Total	14	7	1
Olympic Games
Gold medal – first place	2008 Beijing	200 m breaststroke
Gold medal – first place	2012 London	200 m breaststroke
Gold medal – first place	2012 London	4×100 m medley
Silver medal – second place	2008 Beijing	100 m breaststroke
Silver medal – second place	2008 Beijing	4×100 m medley
Silver medal – second place	2012 London	100 m breaststroke
World Championships (LC)
Gold medal – first place	2009 Rome	100 m breaststroke
Gold medal – first place	2011 Shanghai	100 m breaststroke
Gold medal – first place	2011 Shanghai	200 m breaststroke
Gold medal – first place	2011 Shanghai	4×100 m medley
Silver medal – second place	2009 Rome	50 m breaststroke
Bronze medal – third place	2011 Shanghai	50 m breaststroke
World Championships (SC)
Gold medal – first place	2010 Dubai	50 m breaststroke
Gold medal – first place	2010 Dubai	100 m breaststroke
Gold medal – first place	2010 Dubai	200 m breaststroke
Silver medal – second place	2010 Dubai	4×100 m medley
Pan Pacific Championships
Gold medal – first place	2010 Irvine	100 m breaststroke
Gold medal – first place	2010 Irvine	200 m breaststroke
Gold medal – first place	2010 Irvine	4×100 m medley
Universiade
Gold medal – first place	2005 Izmir	4×100 m medley
Silver medal – second place	2005 Izmir	100 m breaststroke
Silver medal – second place	2005 Izmir	200 m breaststroke

Rebecca Soni (born March 18, 1987) is an American former competition swimmer and breaststroke specialist who swam for the University of Southern California and is a six-time Olympic medalist. She is a former world record-holder in the 100-meter breaststroke (short and long course) and the 200-meter breaststroke (short and long course), and is the first woman to swim the 200-meter breaststroke in under 2 minutes 20 seconds. As a member of the U.S. national team, she held the world record in the 4×100-meter medley relay from 2012 to 2017 (long course).

Soni has won a total of twenty-two medals in major international competition, fourteen gold, seven silver, and one bronze spanning the Olympics, the World, the Universiade, and the Pan Pacific Championships. She burst onto the international scene at the 2008 Summer Olympics where she won two silver medals and one gold. In the 200-meter breaststroke at the Olympics, she set the world record en route to winning gold, shocking Australian favorite Leisel Jones. Four years later at the 2012 Summer Olympics, Soni successfully defended her Olympic title in the 200-meter breaststroke in world record time, becoming the first woman to do so in the event.

She was named Swimming World's World Swimmer of the Year award in 2010 and 2011, and received the American Swimmer of the Year award in 2009, 2010 and 2011.

== Early life and swimming ==
Soni was born March 18, 1987 in Freehold Borough, New Jersey, U.S. Her father Peter is of Hungarian-Jewish descent; he and his family emigrated from Cluj-Napoca, Transilvania (now in Romania), from which their families had been deported during World War II. Her Jewish paternal grandfather Poli Schoenberg survived the Auschwitz concentration camp, whereas his parents lost their lives in the Holocaust. Her father's first marriage was to an American woman, whom he met during his studies; they resided together in the United States, but eventually divorced. Her mother Kinga is her father's second marriage. She also has distant relatives in Israel.

Soni is a 2005 graduate of West Windsor-Plainsboro High School North in Plainsboro Township, New Jersey. During her high school years, Soni held many school records and was a New Jersey state record holder in both the 200y and 100y breaststroke. Starting at the age of 13, and continuing throughout her high school years, Soni swam for Scarlet Aquatics, a program run by coach Tom Speedling in Piscataway, New Jersey. near the Rutgers campus. Speedling received the Award of Excellence from the American Swimming Coaches Association five times, and coached both future Olympians and All Americans during his career. In July 2006 she had a cardiac ablation. Throughout 2005, Soni had a top 25 global ranking in the 200m and 100m breaststroke.

=== University of Southern California ===
Soni attended the University of Southern California (USC) from around 2005-2009 where she swam under Head Coach Dave Salo. In the summers during her collegiate years, she swam for the Trojan Swim Club, associated with USC. Swimming for the USC varsity team, Soni was a six-time NCAA Champion, having won the 200-yard breaststroke in 2006 through 2009 and the 100-yard breaststroke in 2008 and 2009. Soni earned eleven All-American honors as a USC swimmer from 2006–09 and was the first women to capture 200-yard NCAA breaststroke titles in four successive years. In conference competition, while competing for USC, Soni won a total of six titles at the Pac-10 Conference championships.

In August 2010, Soni became a spokeswoman for the United Nations Foundation's Girl Up campaign. The organization focuses on improving the lives of the world's adolescent girls.

=== Early swim career ===
As a 17-year-old at the 2004 U.S. Olympic Team Trials, Soni finished 15th overall in the 100-meter breaststroke and 11th overall in the 200-meter breaststroke. The following year, at the 2005 World Championship Trials, Soni just missed a spot on the 2005 World Aquatic team after finishing third in the 200-meter breaststroke behind Tara Kirk and Kristen Caverly. Soni also placed fourth in the 100-meter breaststroke. At the 2005 Summer Universiade, Soni earned her first international medals by winning silver in the 100-meter and 200-meter breaststroke and gold in the 4×100-meter medley relay. At the 2006 World Short Course Championships, Soni finished in 4th place in the 200-meter breaststroke. Just a few weeks before the 2006 National Championships, Soni underwent a procedure called radiofrequency ablation to help regulate her heartbeat. Although it was not health-threatening, Soni would sometimes experience a high heart rate which sometimes interfered with her training. At the 2006 National Championships, the selection meet for the 2006 Pan Pacific Swimming Championships and the 2007 World Aquatics Championships, Soni finished tenth overall in both the 100-meter and 200-meter breaststroke.

=== 2008 ===
==== 2008 Olympic Trials ====
At the 2008 U.S. Olympic Team Trials, Soni competed in two events, the 100-meter and 200-meter breaststroke. In the 100-meter breaststroke, Soni finished fourth in a time of 1:07.80. Usually, the top two finishers would qualify for the Olympics. However, after second-place finisher Jessica Hardy withdrew from the team due to a doping violation and third-place finisher Tara Kirk missed the entry deadline, Soni was chosen to swim the event. Soni earned her berth by being the swimmer already on the team with the fastest time in the event since January 1, 2006. In the 200-meter breaststroke, Soni won with a time of 2:22.60, the third-fastest finish as of that date.

== 2008 Beijing Olympics ==
2008 Olympics
Gold medal – first place	2008 Beijing	200 m breaststroke
Silver medal – second place	2008 Beijing	100 m breaststroke
Silver medal – second place	2008 Beijing	4x100 m medley relay

At the 2008 Beijing Olympics, Soni won a silver medal in the 100-meter breaststroke, finishing behind world record holder Leisel Jones of Australia 1:06.73 to 1:05.17. In the 200-meter breaststroke, Soni upset the heavily favored Jones, winning the gold medal and breaking Jones's world record with a time of 2:20.22. Jones finished second with a time of 2:22.05. After the race, Soni said, "It's been a long road to get here, I can't believe what just happened." Soni then combined with Natalie Coughlin, Christine Magnuson, and Dara Torres in the 4×100-meter medley relay to finish second behind Australia. Soni had the second best split time in the field (1:05.95) behind Jones (1:04.58).

=== 2009 ===
==== 2009 National Championships ====
At the 2009 National Championships Soni competed in two events, the 100-meter and 200-meter breaststroke. In the 100-meter breaststroke, Soni easily won with a time of 1:05.34. In the 200-meter breaststroke, Soni again exhibited dominance by finishing first with a time of 2:20.38, just off her world record pace.

==== 2009 World Aquatics Championships ====
At the 2009 World Aquatics Championships, held in Rome, Soni set a meet record in the heats of the 100-meter breaststroke, with a time of 1:05.66. In the semi-final, Soni recorded a time of 1:04.84 to set a new world record and become the first female to finish under 1:05 for the event. In the final of the 100-meter breaststroke, Soni won the gold with a time of 1:04.93. Despite being the favorite in the 200-meter breaststroke, Soni went out too fast in the first half of the race and faded in the final meters, ultimately placing fourth. In the 50-meter breaststroke, Soni was narrowly beaten for the gold and the world record by two one-hundredths (0.02) of a second by Russian swimmer Yuliya Yefimova.

For her performance at the World Championships, she was named the American Swimmer of the Year by Swimming World.

==== 2009 Duel in the Pool ====
Soni then competed at the 2009 Duel in the Pool, a short course meet held in December at Manchester. In the 200-meter breaststroke, Soni broke Leisel Jones' world record with a time of 2:14.57. One day later, Soni swam a 1:02.70 in the 100-meter breaststroke to break Jones' world record of 1:03.00.

=== 2010 ===
==== 2010 National Championships ====
At the 2010 National Championships, Soni qualified to compete at the 2010 Pan Pacific Swimming Championships in the 100 and 200-meter breaststroke. In the 100-meter breaststroke, Soni won in a time of 1:05.73. In the 200-meter breaststroke, Soni easily won with a time of 2:21.60, almost five seconds ahead of second-place finisher Amanda Beard.

==== 2010 Pan Pacific Swimming Championships ====
At the 2010 Pan Pacific Swimming Championships, Soni won a total of three gold medals. In the 100-meter breaststroke, Soni recorded the third fastest time in history and the fastest time recorded in a textile suit with a 1:04.93 to win the gold medal ahead of Australians Leisel Jones and Sarah Katsoulis. Her time was also the fastest ever recorded in a textile swimsuit. Two days after the 100-meter breaststroke, Soni then competed in the 200-meter breaststroke and the 4×100-meter medley relay. In the 200-meter breaststroke, Soni dominated the field with a time of 2:20.69. Leisel Jones came in second in 2:23.23 and world record holder Annamay Pierse came in third with a time of 2:23.65. Less than an hour after the event, Soni competed in the 4×100-meter medley relay with Natalie Coughlin, Dana Vollmer and Jessica Hardy. Performing the breaststroke leg, Soni recorded a time of 1:05.35, the fastest in the field; the American team went on to win the gold in a time of 3:55.23.

For her performance at the Pan Pacific Swimming Championships, Soni was named the World Swimmer of the Year and American Swimmer of the Year by Swimming World Magazine.

==== 2010 Short Course World Championships ====
At the end of 2010, Soni competed at the 2010 World Short Course Championships in Dubai, where she won three gold medals and one silver. Soni swept all the breaststroke events and individually set four championship records.

=== 2011 ===
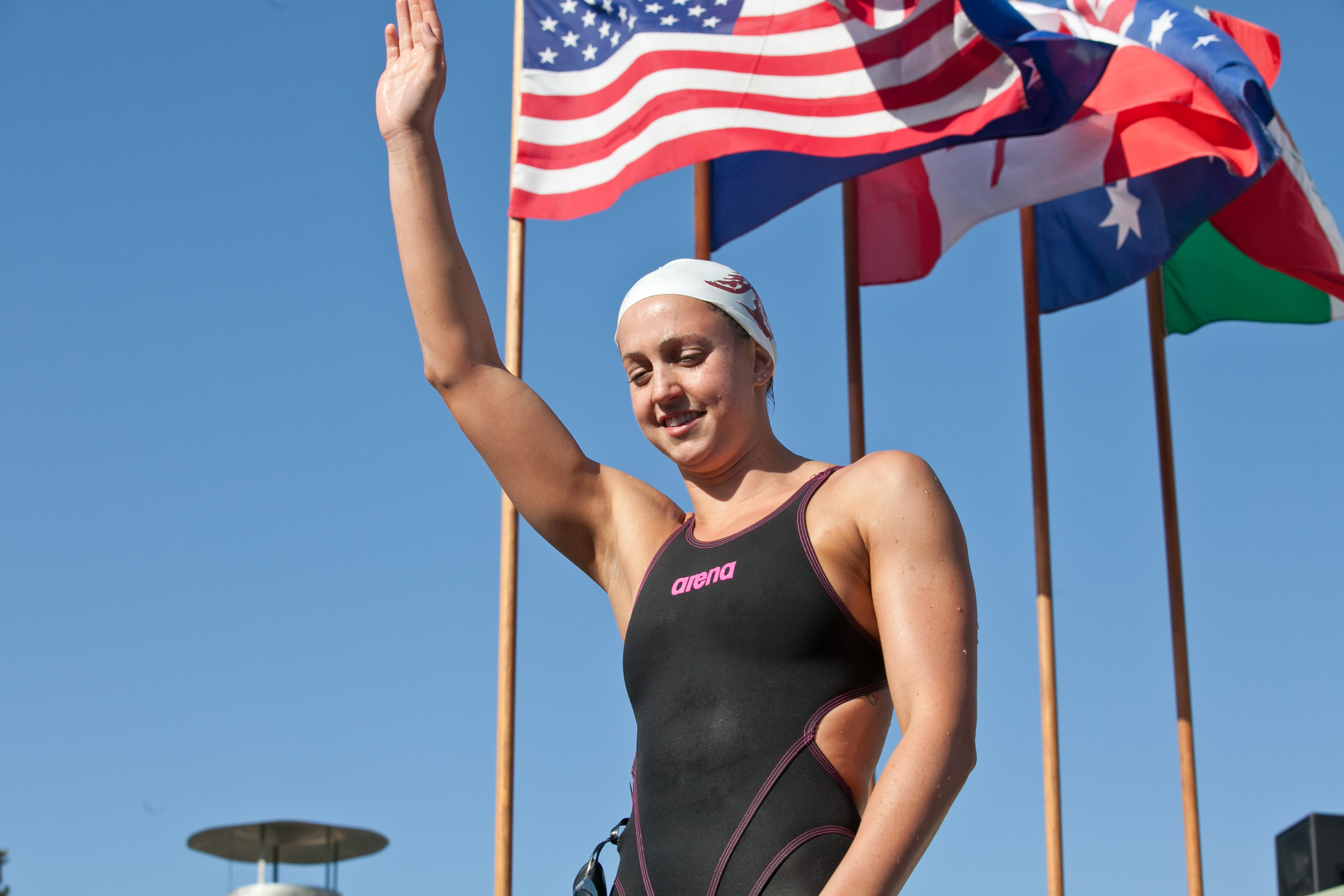
Soni in 2011

==== 2011 World Aquatics Championships ====
Soni won her first gold medal in the 100-meter breaststroke. After posting the top times in the heats (1:05.54) and semi-finals (1:04.91), Soni recorded a time of 1:05.05 in the final for the win. Her winning time was over a second ahead of second-place finisher Leisel Jones. In her second event, the 200-meter breaststroke, Soni won with a time of 2:21.47, her first gold medal in the event at a long course World Championships. However, her time in the final was slightly slower than her semi-final time of 2:21.03. In the 4×100-meter medley relay, Soni won gold with Natalie Coughlin, Dana Vollmer, and Missy Franklin with a time of 3:52.36, over three seconds ahead of second-place finisher China. Swimming the breaststroke leg, Soni had a split of 1:04.71. The final time of 3:52.36 for the medley relay was the second-fastest effort of all time, just behind the Chinese-owned world record of 3:52.19. In her last event, the 50-meter breaststroke, Soni finished in third place behind Jessica Hardy and Yuliya Yefimova.

At the year's end, Soni was named the World Swimmer of the Year and American Swimmer of the Year by Swimming World, and defended her titles from 2010.

== 2012 London Olympics ==
2012 Olympics
Gold medal – first place	2012 London	200 m breaststroke
Gold medal – first place	2012 London	4x100 m medley relay
Silver medal – second place	2012 London	100 m breaststroke

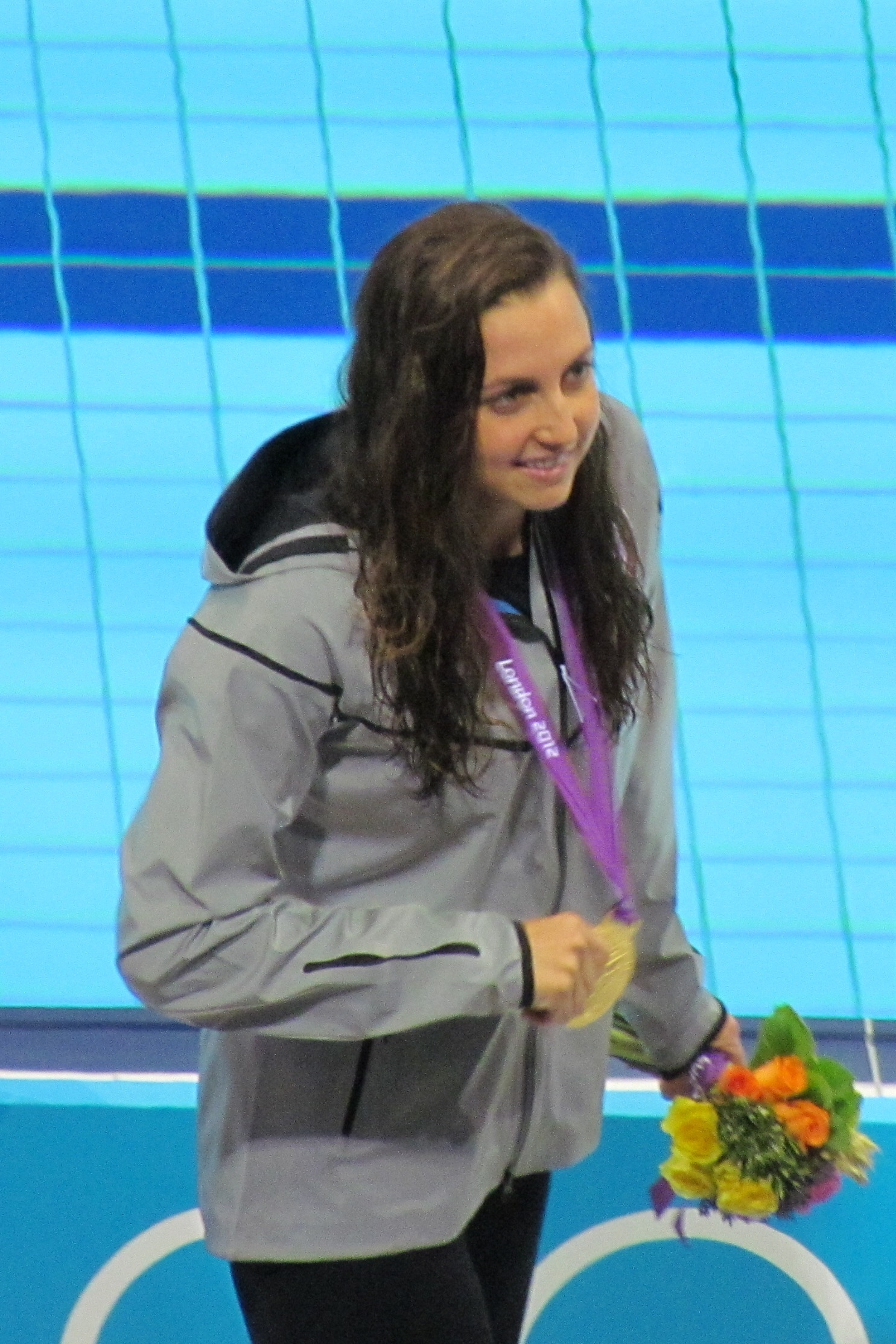
Soni at the 2012 Summer Olympics

At the 2012 Summer Olympics in London, Soni won a silver medal in the 100-meter breaststroke, finishing 0.08 seconds behind 15-year-old Lithuanian Rūta Meilutytė and repeating her result from the 2008 Olympics. Dave Salo, her former coach at USC, served as an Assistant coach for the U.S. team at the 2012 Olympics.

After topping the heats of the 200-metre breaststroke with a time of 2:21.40, and breaking Annamay Pierse's world record in the semi-finals with a time of 2:20.00, Soni won a gold medal in the final of the 200-meter breaststroke with a time of 2:19.59, breaking her own world record and becoming the first woman ever to break 2 minutes 20 seconds in the event. With her win, Soni became the first female to successfully defend her title in the event.

In her final event, the 4×100-meter medley relay, she won gold with Missy Franklin, Dana Vollmer and Allison Schmitt. Swimming the breaststroke leg, she recorded a time of 1:04.82, and the U.S. team went on to set a new world record with a combined time of 3:52.05, bettering the previous Chinese-owned record of 3:52.19 set in 2009.

=== 2013 ===
Soni took the year off to recover from a back injury, but returned to the 2013 World Aquatics Championships as a spectator.

=== 2021 ===
On October 9, 2021, Soni was inducted into the International Swimming Hall of Fame. Originally scheduled to be inducted into the Class of 2020, her induction was delayed from April 24–25, 2020 due to the COVID-19 Pandemic. The week of her being announced as a future inductee, Swimming World ranked the announcement and her as future induction as number five for their "The Week That Was" honor, three spots behind fellow breaststroker Meghan Dressel getting engaged to Caeleb Dressel.

=== Careers outside swimming ===
From 2015-2022, Soni served as an Operations Manager for RISE athletes, where her responsibilities included growing the business, improving online programs, and organizing projects including training. She has more recently served as a Finance Assistant for NOLS, a non-profit wilderness school.

== Personal bests ==
As of August 2, 2012.

Long course
Event	Time	Meet	Date	Note(s)
50 m breaststroke	30.11	2009 World Aquatics Championships	August 2, 2009	
100 m breaststroke	1:04.84	2009 World Aquatics Championships	July 27, 2009	
200 m breaststroke	2:19.59	2012 Summer Olympics	August 2, 2012	

Short course
Event	Time	Meet	Date	Note(s)
50 m breaststroke	29.83	2010 Short Course Worlds	December 16, 2010	
100 m breaststroke	1:02.70	2009 Duel in the Pool	December 19, 2009	
200 m breaststroke	2:14.57	2009 Duel in the Pool	December 18, 2009	

== World records ==
External videos
- Rebecca Soni Breaks World Record - 200m Breaststroke | London 2012 Olympics

No.	Distance	Event	Time	Meet	Location	Date	Age
1	200 m	Breaststroke	2:20.22	2008 Summer Olympics	Beijing, CHN	August 15, 2008	21
2	100 m	Breaststroke	1:04.84	2009 World Aquatics Championships	Rome, ITA	July 27, 2009	22
3	200 m	Breaststroke (sc)^{[a]}	2:14.57	2009 Duel in the Pool	Manchester, UK	December 18, 2009	22
4	100 m	Breaststroke (sc)^{[a]}	1:02.70	2009 Duel in the Pool	Manchester, UK	December 19, 2009	22
5	4×100 m	Medley relay (sc)^{[b]}	3:45.56	2011 Duel in the Pool	Atlanta, Georgia, US	December 16, 2011	24
6	200 m	Breaststroke	2:20.00	2012 Summer Olympics	London, UK	August 1, 2012	25
7	200 m	Breaststroke^{[c]}	2:19.59	2012 Summer Olympics	London, UK	August 2, 2012	25
8	4×100 m	Medley relay^{[d]}	3:52.05	2012 Summer Olympics	London, UK	August 4, 2012	25

^{a} Record set in a short course pool.
^{b} Short course record with Natalie Coughlin, Dana Vollmer, and Missy Franklin.
^{c} The first woman to swim in under 2 minutes 20 seconds in the event.
^{d} Record set with Missy Franklin, Dana Vollmer, and Allison Schmitt.

== See also ==
- List of multiple Olympic gold medalists
- List of Olympic medalists in swimming (women)
- List of United States records in swimming
- List of University of Southern California people
- List of World Aquatics Championships medalists in swimming (women)
- List of world records in swimming
- World record progression 100 metres breaststroke
- World record progression 200 metres breaststroke
- World record progression 4 × 100 metres medley relay

Records
Preceded by Leisel Jones	Women's 200-meter breaststroke world record-holder (long course); August 15, 2008 – July 30, 2009	Succeeded by Annamay Pierse
Preceded by Leisel Jones	Women's 100-meter breaststroke world record-holder (long course); July 27, 2009 – August 7, 2009	Succeeded by Jessica Hardy
Preceded by Leisel Jones	Women's 200-meter breaststroke world record-holder (short course); December 18, 2009 – present	Succeeded by Incumbent
Preceded by Leisel Jones	Women's 100-meter breaststroke world record-holder (short course); December 19, 2009 – October 12, 2013	Succeeded by Rūta Meilutytė
Preceded by Annamay Pierse	Women's 200-meter breaststroke world record-holder (long course); August 1, 2012 – August 1, 2013	Succeeded by Rikke Møller Pedersen
Awards
Preceded by Federica Pellegrini	World Swimmer of the Year; 2010–2011	Succeeded by Missy Franklin
Preceded by Natalie Coughlin	American Swimmer of the Year; 2009–2011 (Shared with Kukors in 2009)	Succeeded by Missy Franklin
Sporting positions
Preceded by Anastasia Zuyeva	Mare Nostrum Tour overall winner 2010	Succeeded by Ryosuke Irie
