= Keri Hehn =

American swimmer (born 1981)

Personal information
- Nationality: United States
- Born: May 13, 1981 (age 45)
- Height: 5 ft 9 in (175 cm)

Sport
- Sport: Swimming
- Strokes: Breaststroke
- Club: Trojan Swim Club
- College team: University of Minnesota
Medal record
Women's swimming
Representing the United States
Pan American Games
Bronze medal – third place	2007 Rio de Janeiro	200m Breaststroke

Keri Hehn (born May 13, 1981) is an American swimmer. Hehn is originally from Fargo, North Dakota, but now lives in Los Angeles and swims for the Trojan Swim Club under coach Dave Salo. Away from swimming, Hehn is a full-time public relations professional.

At the 2009 US National Championships and World Championship Trials, Hehn was placed second in the 200m breaststroke, earning a place to compete at the 2009 World Aquatics Championships in Rome. In Rome, Hehn was placed ninth in the 200m breaststroke with a time of 2:23.30, just missing out on a place in the final.
