= Nađa Higl =

Serbian swimmer (born 1987)

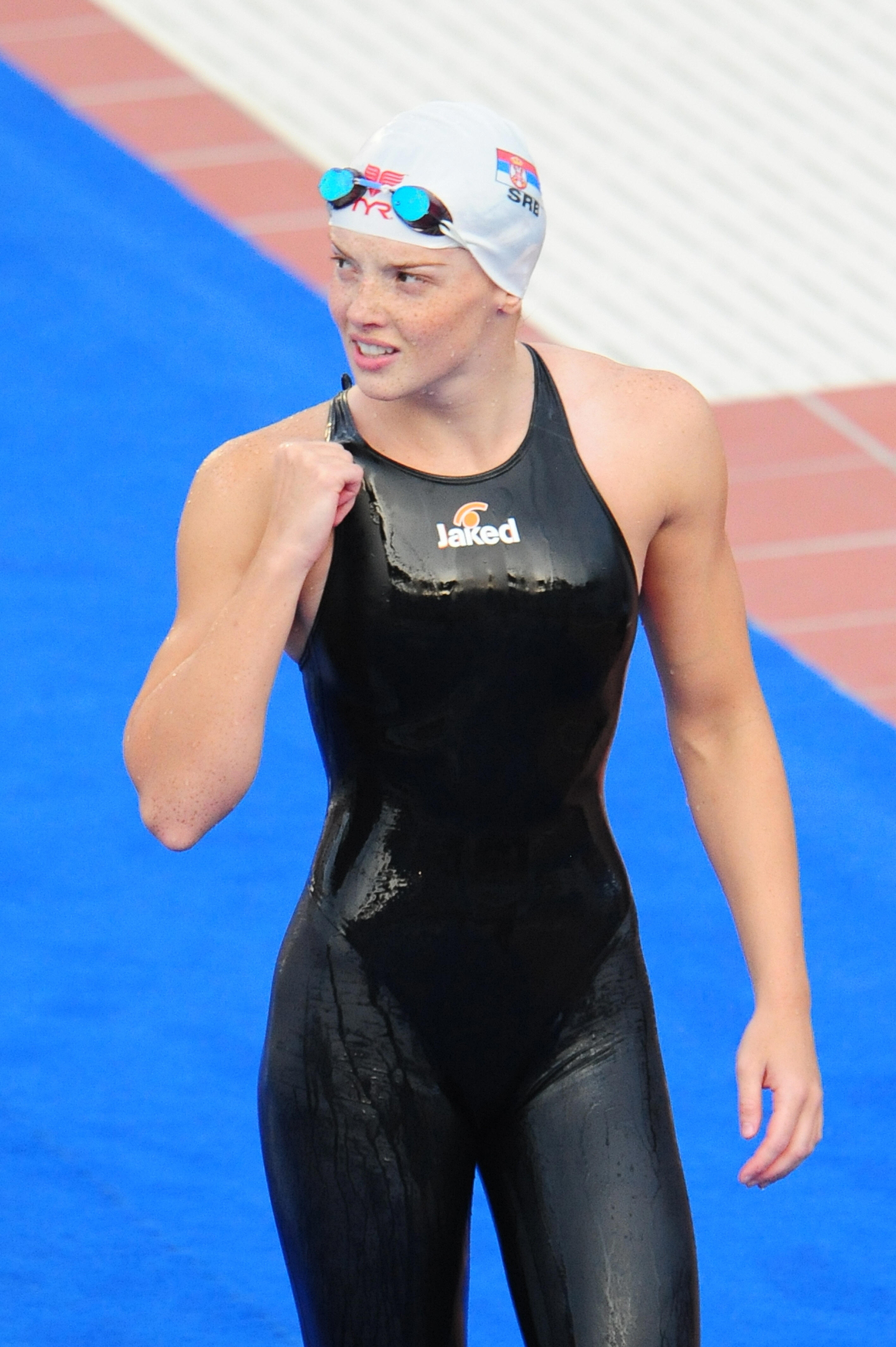
- Higl at the 2010 European Aquatics Championships in Budapest

Personal information
- Nationality: Serbia
- Born: 2 January 1987 (age 39) Pančevo, SR Serbia, SFR Yugoslavia
- Height: 1.73 m (5 ft 8 in)
- Weight: 69 kg (152 lb)

Sport
- Sport: Swimming
- Strokes: Breaststroke
- Club: PK Tamiš
Medal record
Women's swimming
Representing Serbia
World Championships (LC)
Gold medal – first place	2009 Rome	200 m breaststroke
European Championships (SC)
Silver medal – second place	2009 Istanbul	200 m breaststroke
Universiade
Silver medal – second place	2009 Belgrade	100 m breaststroke
Silver medal – second place	2009 Belgrade	200 m breaststroke

Nađa Higl (Serbian Cyrillic: Нађа Хигл; born 2 January 1987) is a Serbian swimmer. She was World Champion in 200 m breaststroke.

Higl was awarded the title "Serbian Sportswoman of the year" for the year 2009 by the Olympic Committee of Serbia and Golden Badge, award for the best athlete of Serbia.

== Swimming career ==
At the 2009 World Aquatics Championships she won gold medal in the 200 meters breaststroke final on 31 July 2009 with a time of 2:21.62, the new European record. She is the first Serbian woman to become a world champion in swimming.

She competed at the 2008 Summer Olympics in 100 m breaststroke and 200 m breaststroke where she finished in qualification rounds as 43rd and 33rd respectively. At the 2009 Summer Universiade she won silver medals in 100 m breaststroke and 200 m breaststroke.

== Results ==
Year	Event	Location	Discipline	Position	Time
2003	European Junior Swimming Championships	(United Kingdom) Glasgow	100 m breaststroke	24	1:15.95
2003	European Junior Swimming Championships	(United Kingdom) Glasgow	200 m breaststroke	16	2:38.59
2006	European Championships	(Hungary) Budapest	100 m breaststroke	44	1:16.99
2006	European Championships	(Hungary) Budapest	200 m breaststroke	25	2:40.73
2007	European Championships 25 m	(Hungary) Debrecen	100 m breaststroke	23	1:11.10
2007	European Championships 25 m	(Hungary) Debrecen	200 m breaststroke	23	2:31.14
2008	World Championships 25 m	(United Kingdom) Manchester	100 m breaststroke	20	1:10.41
2008	World Championships 25 m	(United Kingdom) Manchester	200 m breaststroke	15	2:28.47
2008	Olympics	(China) Beijing	100 m breaststroke	43	1:13.19
2008	Olympics	(China) Beijing	200 m breaststroke	33	2:32.78
2009	Mediterranean Games	(Italy) Pescara	100 m breaststroke	10	1:11.50
2009	Mediterranean Games	(Italy) Pescara	200 m breaststroke	4	2:29.79
2009	Mediterranean Games	(Italy) Pescara	4 × 100 m medley relay	5	1:07.75 (4:14.14)
2009	Summer Universiade	(Serbia) Belgrade	100 m breaststroke	2	1:07.80
2009	Summer Universiade	(Serbia) Belgrade	200 m breaststroke	2	2:24.20
2009	Summer Universiade	(Serbia) Belgrade	4 × 100 m medley relay	15	1:13.70 (4:29.49)
2009	World Championships	(Italy) Rome	100 m breaststroke	16	1:08.13
2009	World Championships	(Italy) Rome	200 m breaststroke	1	2:21.62
2009	European Championships 25 m	(Turkey) Istanbul	100 m breaststroke	11	1:06.41
2009	European Championships 25 m	(Turkey) Istanbul	200 m breaststroke	2	2:17.52
2010	European Championships 50 m	(Hungary) Budapest	100 m breaststroke	22	1:10.97
2010	European Championships 50 m	(Hungary) Budapest	200 m breaststroke	8	2:29.60
2011	World Championships	(China) Shanghai	200 m breaststroke	6	2:25.93
2012	European Championships 50 m	(Hungary) Debrecen	200 m breaststroke	6	2:28.24
2012	Olympics	(United Kingdom) London	200 m breaststroke	25	2:28.39

== Personal life ==
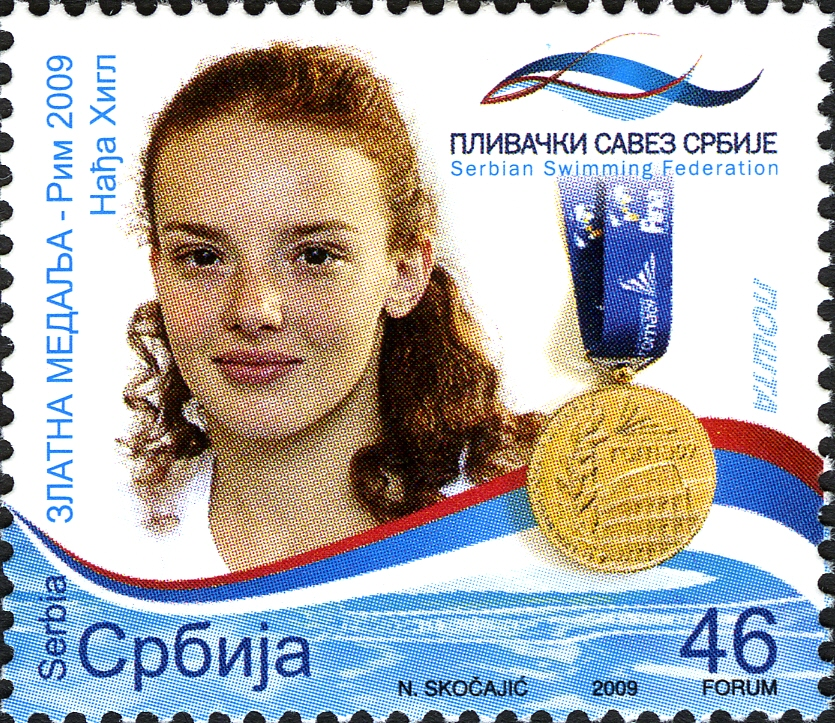
Nađa Higl on a 2009 Serbian stamp

Nađa's parents are father Dragan and mother Snežana. Her brother Sebastijan is her personal trainer. Higl is married to Milan Boharević and has two children with him. The family moved to Ljubljana in 2021.

== See also ==
- List of swimmers
- List of World Aquatics Championships medalists in swimming (women)
- List of European Short Course Swimming Championships medalists (women)
- List of Serbian records in swimming

Awards
Preceded by Milorad Čavić	The Best Athlete of Serbia; 2009	Succeeded by Novak Djokovic
Records
Preceded by (Austria) Mirna Jukić	Women's 200 m breaststroke European record holder (long course); 31 July 2009 – 2 August 2012	Succeeded by (Russia) Yuliya Yefimova
