= Lia Dekker =

Dutch swimmer (born 1987)

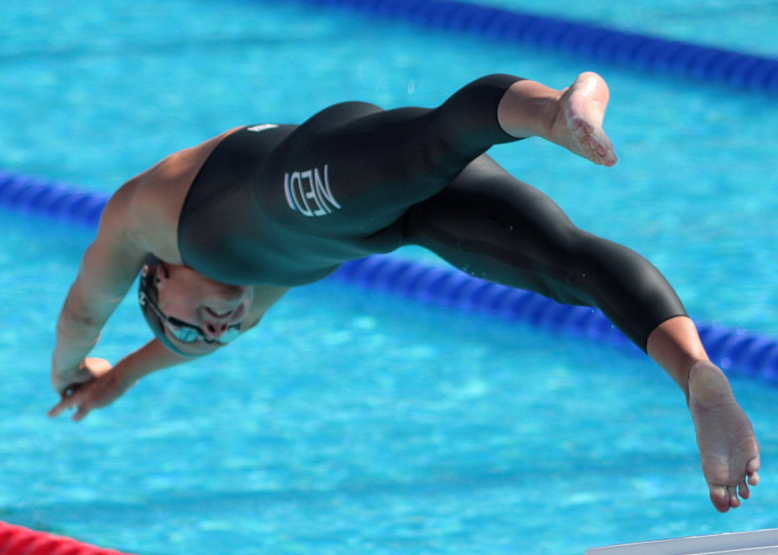
- Lia Dekker at the 2009 World Championships

Personal information
- Nationality: Netherlands
- Born: 24 January 1987 (age 39) Assen, Drenthe, Netherlands
- Height: 1.75 m (5 ft 9 in)
- Weight: 62 kg (137 lb)

Sport
- Sport: Swimming
- Strokes: Breaststroke
- Club: DZ&PC

Lia Dekker (born 24 January 1987) is a Dutch swimmer who specializes in breaststroke. Dekker holds the national record in the 200 metres breaststroke in the 50 m pool. She is the younger sister of Inge Dekker, 2008 Olympic champion in the 4×100 metre freestyle relay.

== Swimming career ==
At the Dutch National Championships in June 2008, Dekker qualified for the European SC Championships 2008 in Rijeka, Croatia. A week before the European Championships, Dekker broke the national record in the 200 m breaststroke, which was set by Linda Moes during the 1988 Olympics in Seoul, South Korea. The day after she also claimed the national record in the 100 m breaststroke, held by Moniek Nijhuis since 2007. In Rijeka, Dekker placed 18th in the 100 m breaststroke and 20th in the 200 m breaststroke. At the Amsterdam Swim Cup 2009 she qualified herself for the 2009 World Aquatics Championships in Rome, Italy in the 100 m breaststroke, although she lost her national record to Nijhuis. In the 200 m breaststroke Dekker lowered her own national record by two seconds, but failed to qualify for Rome for this event.

== Personal bests ==
Short course
Event	Time	Date	Location
50 m breaststroke	32.78	2008-11-22	Winschoten, Netherlands
100 m breaststroke	1:08.04	2008-12-19	Amsterdam, Netherlands
200 m breaststroke	2:27.14	2008-12-20	Amsterdam, Netherlands

Long course
Event	Time	Date	Location
50 m breaststroke	32.18	2009-04-16	Amsterdam, Netherlands
100 m breaststroke	1:07.47	2009-04-17	Amsterdam, Netherlands
200 m breaststroke	NR 2:28.02	2009-04-19	Amsterdam, Netherlands

== See also ==
- List of Dutch records in swimming
