= Stacey Tadd =

British swimmer

Personal information
- Born: February 21, 1989 (age 37) Bath, Somerset, England

Sport
- Sport: Swimming
- Strokes: Breaststroke

Stacey Tadd (born 21 February 1989) is a British breaststroke swimmer.

Tadd was selected to represent Great Britain at the 2012 Summer Olympics in the 200 m breaststroke.

Stacey's best international results, to the start of London 2012 Summer Olympics, came in the 2003 European Youth Olympic Festival where she won two gold medals and a bronze.
