= Elise Matthysen =

Belgian swimmer (born 1992)

Personal information
- Full name: Elise Matthysen
- Nationality: Belgium
- Born: 13 July 1992 (age 33) Kalmthout

Sport
- Sport: Swimming
- Strokes: Breaststroke
- Club: Brabo

Elise Matthysen (born 13 July 1992 in Kalmthout) is a retired Belgian swimmer who specialised in breaststroke. During the 2008 European Aquatics Championships she came 4th in the final of the 100 m breaststroke in which she broke the national record of Brigitte Becue. With this excellent performance, she managed to qualify herself for the Olympics. At the Olympics, while still only 16 years of age, she qualified for the semi-finals for both the 100 m breaststroke and 200 m breaststroke with a new Belgian record; eventually she finished respectively 13th and 16th overall.

In the period after the 2008 Olympics, Matthysen suffered both physically and mentally, mainly the result of weight problems. In December 2010, she hired Brigitte Becue as her coach, but Becue could not turn the tide and on 8 November 2011 Becue announced that Matthysen was retiring from swimming and focusing fully on her studies. At that point in time, she was still holder of the national record for the 100 m breaststroke.
