= Yekaterina Sadovnik =

Kazakhstani swimmer

Personal information
- Full name: Yekaterina Sadovnik
- National team: Kazakhstan
- Born: 25 September 1986 (age 39) Pavlodar, Kazakh SSR, Soviet Union
- Height: 1.83 m (6 ft 0 in)
- Weight: 69 kg (152 lb)

Sport
- Sport: Swimming
- Strokes: Breaststroke

Yekaterina Sadovnik (Kazakh: Екатерина Владимировна Садовник (Дубицкая); born September 25, 1986, in Pavlodar) is a Kazakhstani swimmer, who specialized in breaststroke events. She represented her nation Kazakhstan at the 2008 Summer Olympics, and has claimed multiple national championship titles in the sprint breaststroke double (both 50 and 100 m).

Sadovnik competed for the Kazakh swimming team in the women's 100 m breaststroke at the 2008 Summer Olympics in Beijing. She scored a solid 1:11.39 to slide under the FINA B-cut (1:11.43) by four hundredths of a second (0.04) at the Kazakhstan Open Championships three months earlier in Almaty. Sadovnik powered home on the final stretch to touch the wall first over Peru's two-time Olympian Valeria Silva by about a half-body length in heat two with a lifetime best of 1:11.14. Sadovnik failed to advance to the semifinals, as she placed thirty-fourth out of forty-nine swimmers in the prelims.
