= Mina Matsushima =

Japanese swimmer (born 1991)

Personal information
- Nationality: Japanese
- Born: 25 January 1991 (age 35) Tokyo, Japan

Sport
- Sport: Swimming
- Strokes: Breaststroke
Medal record
Swimming
Representing Japan
Universiade
Gold medal – first place	2015 Gwangju	100m breaststroke

Mina Matsushima (松島 美菜, Matsushima Mina; born 25 January 1991) is a Japanese swimmer. She competed for Japan at the 2012 Summer Olympics, reaching the semifinals of the 100 m breaststroke.
