= Wang Randi =

Chinese swimmer (born 1991)

Personal information
- Born: May 31, 1991 (age 35) Dalian, Liaoning

Sport
- Sport: Swimming
Medal record
Representing China
Asian Games
Gold medal – first place	2010 Guangzhou	50m breaststroke

Wang Randi (born May 31, 1991) is a female Chinese swimmer, who competed for Team China at the 2008 Summer Olympics.

== Major achievements ==
- 2007 National Championships - 4th 50 m/5th 100 m breast;
- 2008 Short Course Worlds - 9th 50 m breast
- 2009 Asian Swimming Championships - 3rd 50m breast, 5th 100 breast
