= Chen I-chuan =

Taiwanese swimmer

Personal information
- Born: January 20, 1991 (age 35) Taipei

Sport
- Sport: Swimming
- Strokes: Breaststroke

Chen I-chuan (born 20 January 1991) is a Taiwanese swimmer. At the 2012 Summer Olympics she finished 38th overall in the heats in the Women's 100 metre breaststroke and failed to reach the semifinals.
