= Annamay Pierse =

Canadian swimmer

Personal information
- Full name: Annamay Pierse
- Nicknames: "Anners", "Anna”
- National team: Canada
- Born: December 5, 1983 (age 42) Toronto, Ontario
- Height: 1.79 m (5 ft 10 in)
- Weight: 58 kg (128 lb)

Sport
- Sport: Swimming
- Strokes: Breaststroke
- Club: Pacific Dolphins
- College team: University of British Columbia
Medal record
Women's swimming
Representing Canada
World Championships (LC)
Silver medal – second place	2009 Rome	200 m breaststroke
Commonwealth Games
Bronze medal – third place	2010 Delhi	4×100 m medley
Pan Pacific Championships
Bronze medal – third place	2010 Irvine	200 m breaststroke

Annamay Pierse (born December 5, 1983) is a former competitive swimmer who represented Canada in major international swimming championships including the Summer Olympics, FINA World Championships, Commonwealth Games and Pan Pacific Championships.

Pierse grew up in Edmonton, Alberta, and attended the University of British Columbia in Vancouver, British Columbia. She is the oldest of five sisters – all competitive swimmers – with one older and one younger brother.

Pierse was a breaststroke specialist and the holder of several Canadian records both long course and short course. She was formerly the world record-holder in the 200-metre long course breaststroke until Rebecca Soni beat her time by 12 hundredths of a second during the 200-metre semifinals at the 2012 Summer Olympics.

On April 2, 2008, she placed first at the Canadian Olympic Trials in 100-metre breaststroke thereby qualifying her for the Beijing 2008 Summer Olympics. At the 2008 Summer Olympics in Beijing, she finished in sixth in the final of the 200-metre breaststroke. She was also a member of the Canadian team that finished seventh in the women's 4×100-metre medley relay.

She is married to Olympic paddler, Mark Oldershaw.

== 2008 Summer Olympics ==
Pierse represented Canada at the 2008 Summer Olympics and competed in the following events:

Event	Results
100 meter breaststroke	10th, 1:08.27
200 meter breaststroke	6th, 2:23.77
4×100 meter medley relay	7th, 4:01.35 (2:08.26)

== 2009 Canadian Nationals ==
On March 14, 2009, at the University of Toronto pool, Pierse broke the world short course record in the 200 m breaststroke. Posting a time of 2:17.50. The Previous record was 2:17.75 belonging to Leisel Jones.

She was awarded a new Pontiac Car from a local dealer sponsoring the event who promised a new car to any athlete breaking a world record. A local Speedo dealer also awarded her $2,500 for the feat.

Thanks to this achievement, Pierse also won the Canadian Interuniversity Sport (CIS) female athlete of the year award for 2008–09.

== 2009 World Aquatics Championships ==
Pierse set a new world mark in the 200 m long course breaststroke at the 2009 World Aquatics Championships in Rome, with a time of 2:20.12 in the semi-finals. 1/10 of a second faster than the previous world record, Rebecca Soni set at the Beijing Olympics. However, in the finals, she faded down the final 50m and placed second (2:21.84) to the surprise victor Nadja Higl of Serbia.

== 2010 Pan Pacific Swimming Championships ==
Pierse brought home a bronze medal in the 200m breaststroke from these Championships; Being behind Rebecca Soni, and Leisel Jones. Pierse said that this Pan Pac Bronze medal was more memorable than winning her World Championship medal. She had a rough year due to an illness and missed months of training.

== See also ==
- World record progression 200 metres breaststroke
- World record progression 4 × 100 metres medley relay

Records
Preceded by Leisel Jones	Women's 200-metre breaststroke world record-holder (short course); March 14, 2009 – November 15, 2009	Succeeded by Leisel Jones
Preceded by Rebecca Soni	Women's 200-metre breaststroke world record-holder (long course); July 30, 2009 – August 1, 2012	Succeeded by Rebecca Soni
