= Martha McCabe =

Canadian swimmer

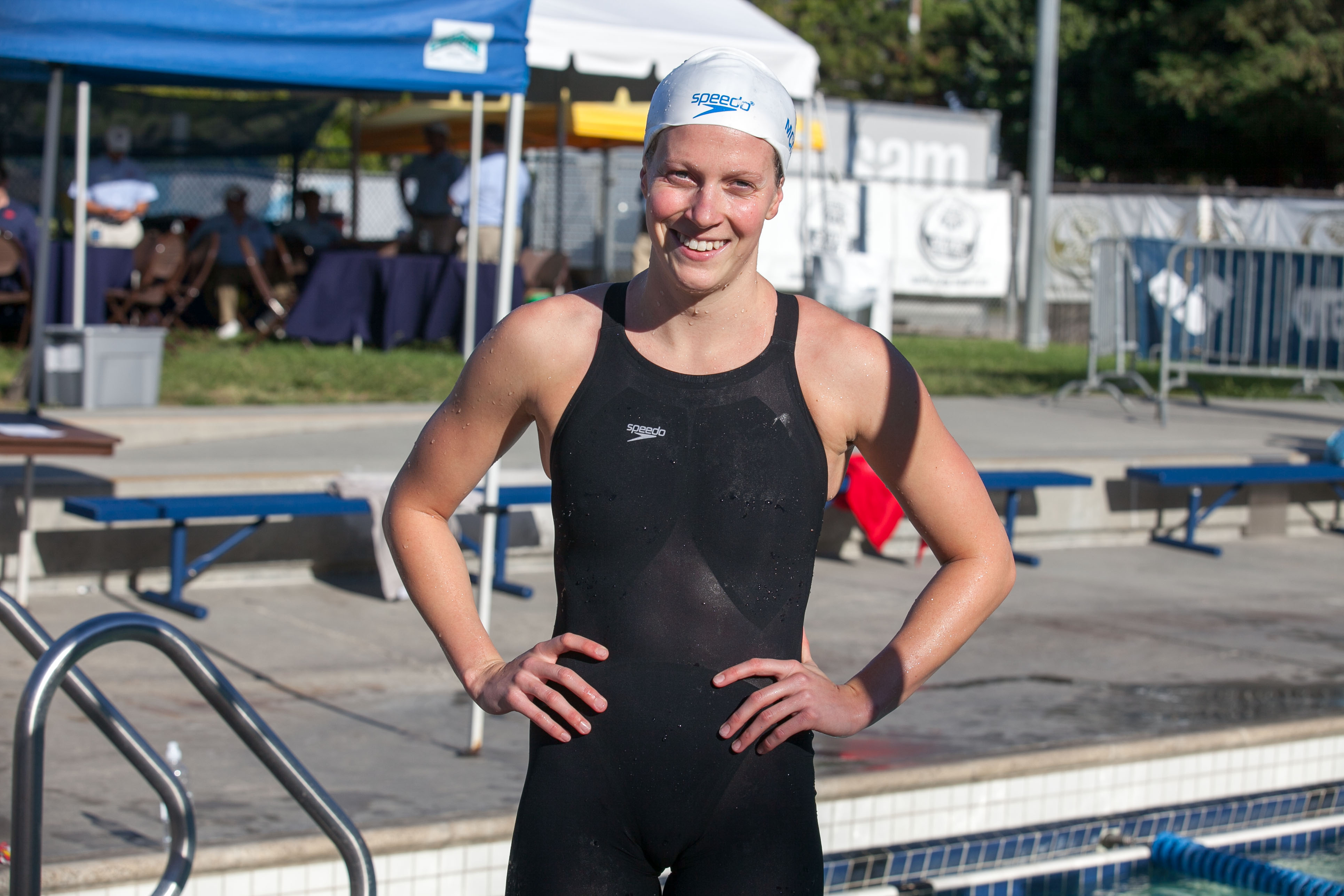

Personal information
- Full name: Martha McCabe
- National team: Canada
- Born: August 4, 1989 (age 37) Toronto, Ontario, Canada
- Height: 1.68 m (5 ft 6 in)
- Weight: 58 kg (128 lb)

Sport
- Sport: Swimming
- Strokes: Breaststroke
- Club: Pacific Dolphins
- College team: University of British Columbia
Medal record
Women's swimming
Representing Canada
World Championships (LC)
Bronze medal – third place	2011 Shanghai	200 m breaststroke
Pan American Games
Silver medal – second place	2015 Toronto	200 m breaststroke

Martha McCabe (born August 4, 1989) is a Canadian competition swimmer. She won bronze in the 200-metre breaststroke at the 2011 World Championships. At the 2012 Summer Olympics in London, McCabe finished fifth in the final of the 200-metre breaststroke. At the 2014 Commonwealth Games, she competed in the 100 m and 200 m breaststroke.

In 2016, she was officially named to Canada's Olympic team for the 2016 Summer Olympics again in the 200 m breaststroke.

== Martha's Canadian Drive ==
After competing at the 2016 Summer Olympics in Rio, Martha embarked on a cross Canada drive to inspire the next generation of athletes by stopping at over 45 swim clubs and schools from Victoria, BC to St. John's, NL. Alongside Matt Bortolussi, the drive spanned 50 days as she spoke to over 3,000 kids, parents, and coaches across the country.

== Personal life ==
In a July 2020 interview with CBC Sports, McCabe came out as a lesbian. She stated in doing so, she hoped to help other young lesbian swimmers who may be struggling with their sexuality.
