= Sun Ye =

Chinese swimmer (born 1989)

Personal information
- Full name: Sun Ye
- Nationality: China
- Born: January 15, 1989 (age 37) Shanghai, China
- Height: 170 cm (5 ft 7 in)
- Weight: 61 kg (134 lb)

Sport
- Sport: Swimming
- Strokes: Breaststroke
Medal record
Olympic Games
Bronze medal – third place	2008 Beijing	4×100 m medley
World Championships (LC)
Silver medal – second place	2011 Shanghai	4×100 m medley
World Championships (SC)
Silver medal – second place	2010 Dubai	200 m breaststroke
Asian Champs
Gold medal – first place	2009 Foshan	200m breaststroke
Summer Universiade
Gold medal – first place	2011 Shenzhen	100 m breaststroke
Gold medal – first place	2011 Shenzhen	200 m breaststroke
Gold medal – first place	2011 Shenzhen	4x100 m medley

Sun Ye (simplified Chinese: 孙晔; traditional Chinese: 孫曄; pinyin: Sūn Yè) born January 15, 1989, in Shanghai. is an Olympic swimmer from China. She swam for China at the 2008 Olympics where she was part of China's 400 Medley Relay which finished 3rd. She also took part in the 2012 Summer Olympics.

== Major achievements ==
- 2008 Olympics - 7th 100m breaststroke, 3rd 400m Medley Relay
- 2008 Short Course Worlds - 4th 200m breaststroke
- 2009 Asian Swimming Championships - 1st 200m breaststroke

== See also ==
- China at the 2012 Summer Olympics - Swimming
