= Sarah Katsoulis =

Australian swimmer

Personal information
- Full name: Sarah Jane Katsoulis
- Nationality: Australia
- Born: 10 May 1984 (age 42) Milton, New South Wales, Australia
- Height: 1.74 m (5 ft 8 1/2 in)
- Weight: 70 kg (154 lb)

Sport
- Sport: Swimming
- Strokes: Breaststroke
Medal record
World Championships (LC)
Silver medal – second place	2009 Rome	4×100 m medley
Bronze medal – third place	2009 Rome	50 m breaststroke
World Championships (SC)
Silver medal – second place	2008 Manchester	50 m breaststroke
Silver medal – second place	2008 Manchester	4×100 m medley
Silver medal – second place	2012 Istanbul	4×100 m medley
Bronze medal – third place	2004 Indianapolis	200 m breaststroke
Bronze medal – third place	2010 Dubai	4×100 m medley
Bronze medal – third place	2012 Istanbul	50 m breaststroke
Pan Pacific Championships
Bronze medal – third place	2006 Victoria	100 m breaststroke
Bronze medal – third place	2006 Victoria	4×100 m medley
Bronze medal – third place	2010 Irvine	100 m breaststroke
Commonwealth Games
Bronze medal – third place	2010 Delhi	200 m breaststroke

Sarah Jane Katsoulis (born 10 May 1984 in Milton) is an Australian swimmer.

She won a bronze medal in the 200 m breaststroke at the 2010 Commonwealth Games.
