= Tatiane Sakemi =

Brazilian swimmer (born 1986)

Personal information
- Full name: Tatiane Mayumi Sakemi
- Nickname: Tuka
- National team: Brazil
- Born: 22 March 1986 (age 40) São Caetano do Sul, São Paulo, Brazil
- Height: 1.70 m (5 ft 7 in)
- Weight: 54 kg (119 lb)

Sport
- Sport: Swimming
- Strokes: Breaststroke
- Club: EC Pinheiros
Medal record
Women's swimming
Representing Brazil
Pan American Games
Bronze medal – third place	2011 Guadalajara	4×100 m medley
South American Games
Gold medal – first place	2010 Medellín	4×100 m medley
Silver medal – second place	2010 Medellín	100 m breaststroke
Silver medal – second place	2010 Medellín	200 m breaststroke

Tatiane Mayumi Sakemi (born March 22, 1986) is a Brazilian swimmer of Japanese ancestry, who specialized in breaststroke events. She is a member of the swimming team for Esporte Clube Pinheiros in São Paulo.

== Swimming career ==
In international rankings, Sakemi was not among the 150 best in the world by 2007. In 2008, she was the 30th best in the 50m breaststroke, and the 120th best in the 100m breaststroke. In 2009, she became the 6th best in the 50m breaststroke, and 20th best in the 100m breaststroke, plus the best in the two races in Brazil.

At the 2007 Pan American Games, in Rio de Janeiro, she came in 6th place in the 100m breaststroke, 7th in the 200m breaststroke and won bronze in the 4 × 100 m medley, but lost the medal because of doping problem of Rebeca Gusmao.

In 2007, she already held South American records in the 50 and 100m breaststroke.

Sakemi qualified for three swimming events at the 2008 Summer Olympics in Beijing, by eclipsing FINA B-standard entry times of 1:11.20 (100 m breaststroke) and 2:33.17 (200 m breaststroke) from the Maria Lenk Trophy in Rio de Janeiro. In the 100 m breaststroke, Sakemi challenged seven other swimmers on the third heat, including Argentina's Liliana Guiscardo, who beat her from the trials two months earlier. She edged out Iceland's Erla Dögg Haraldsdóttir to take the fifth spot and thirty-ninth overall by three hundredths of a second (0.03), in 1:11.75. In the 200 m breaststroke, Sakemi rounded out the first heat in last place and fortieth overall against Lithuania's Raminta Dvariškytė, and Finland's Noora Laukkanen, with a slowest time of 2:39.13.

On the final night of preliminaries, Sakemi teamed up with Fabíola Molina, Tatiana Barbosa, and Gabriella Silva in the women's 4 × 100 m medley relay. Swimming the breaststroke leg, Sakemi recorded a time of 1:10.42, and the Brazilian team finished the heats in tenth overall with a final time of 4:02.61.

Participating in the 2009 World Aquatics Championships in Rome, Tatiane ranked 27th in the 50m breaststroke, 35th in the 100m breaststroke, and 44th in the 200m breaststroke.

In 2009, Sakemi broke many South American records: at Olympic pool, broke the 50m breaststroke record with a time of 30s81, the 100m breaststroke with 1m07s67, and the 200m breaststroke with 2m29s46, all in May. In short course, on November, broke the record of the 50m breaststroke with 30s50, the 100m breaststroke with 1m06s49, and the 200m breaststroke with 2m26s44.

She was at the 2010 Pan Pacific Swimming Championships in Irvine, where she finished 18th in the 50m breaststroke, 22nd in the 100m breaststroke and dropped the 200m breaststroke.

At the 2010 World Military Games at Warendorf, Germany, she won the silver medal in the 50m breaststroke, the 200m breast, 4 × 100 m relay, and bronze in the 100 meter breaststroke.

Sakemi was at the 2010 FINA World Swimming Championships (25 m) in Dubai, where she finished 17th place in the 50m breaststroke, 26th in the 100m breaststroke, was disqualified in the 200m breaststroke, and was at the 4 × 100 m medley final, finishing in 8th place.

At the 2011 Pan American Games in Guadalajara, Mexico, she won bronze in the 4 × 100 m medley. She also finished 6th in the 100m breaststroke.

She won three medals in the same stroke (both 100 and 200 m) at the 2010 South American Games in Medellín, Colombia, and also led her Brazilian team to take the runner-up trophy at the 2011 Pan American Games in Guadalajara, Mexico. She is also a five-time Brazilian record holder in both long and short course swimming, including two from the Maria Lenk Trophy in Rio de Janeiro.

== Personal bests ==
Tatiane Sakemi is the current holder, or former holder, of the following records:

Long Course (50 meters):

- South American record holder of the 50m breaststroke: 30s81, time obtained on May 8, 2009
- South American record holder of the 100m breaststroke: 1m07s67 time obtained on May 9, 2009
- Former South American record holder of the 200m breaststroke: 2m29s46 time obtained on May 5, 2009
- Former South American record holder of the 4 × 100 m medley: 4m02s61 obtained on August 15, 2008, with Fabiola Molina, Gabriella Silva and Tatiana Lemos

Short course (25 meters):

- South American record holder of the 50m breaststroke: 30s50, time obtained on November 15, 2009
- South American record holder of the 100m breaststroke: 1m06s49, time obtained on November 14, 2009
- Brazilian (former South American) record holder of the 200m breaststroke: 2m26s44, time obtained on November 15, 2009
