= Sara Nordenstam =

Norwegian swimmer (born 1983)

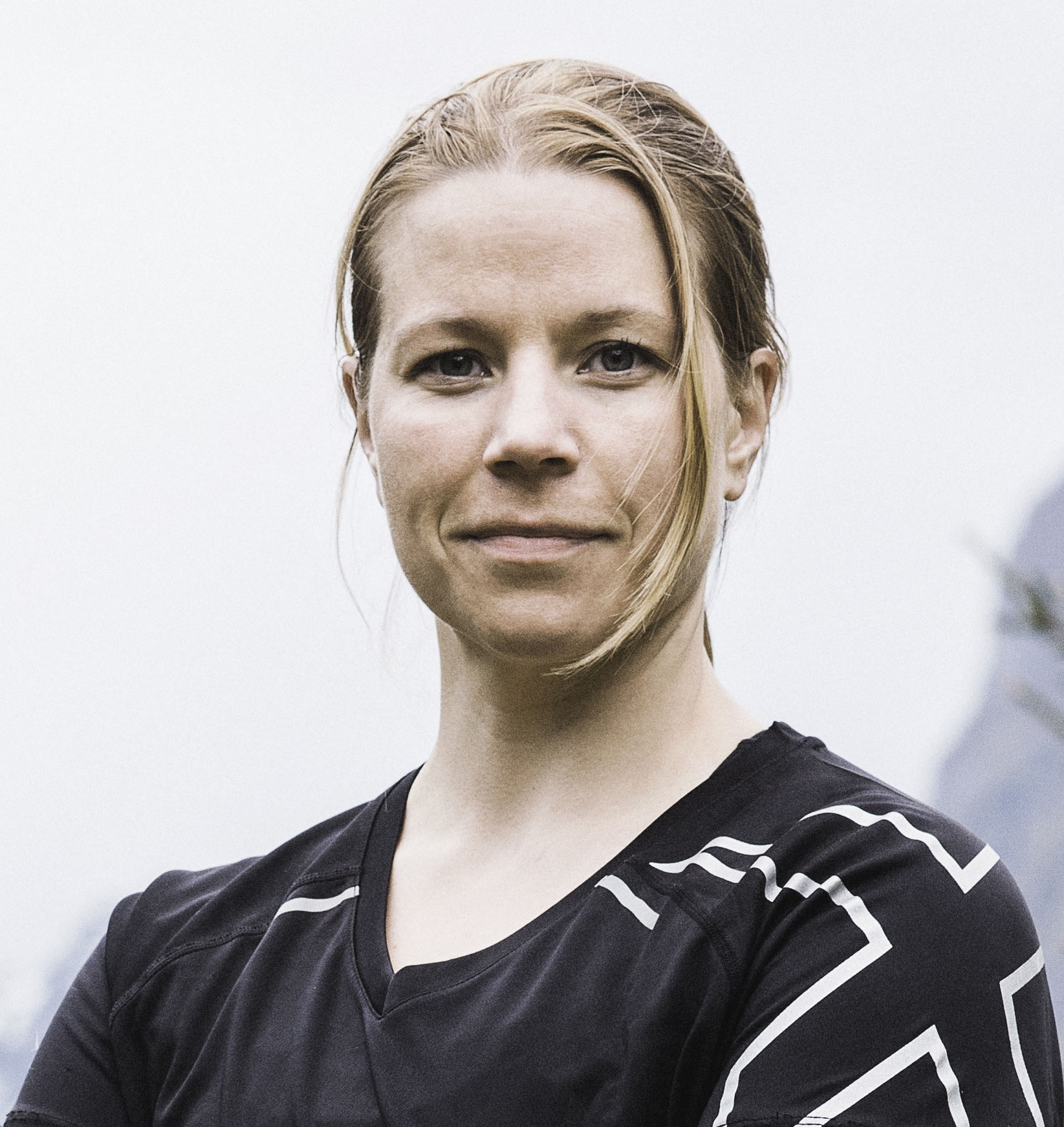

Personal information
- Full name: Sara Nordenstam
- Nationality: Norway
- Born: 28 February 1983 (age 43) Lycksele, Sweden
- Height: 1.69 m (5 ft 7 in)
- Weight: 70 kg (154 lb)

Sport
- Sport: Swimming
- Strokes: Breaststroke
- Club: Lambertseter SK
- College team: SMU Mustangs
Medal record
Women's swimming
Representing Norway
Olympic Games
Bronze medal – third place	2008 Beijing	200 m breaststroke
European Championships (LC)
Gold medal – first place	2012 Debrecen	200 m breaststroke
Silver medal – second place	2010 Budapest	200 m breaststroke

Sara Maria Evelina Nordenstam (born 28 February 1983 in Lycksele, Sweden) is a Norwegian swimmer. Nordenstam was born to Swedish parents and lived in Sweden until she was 10, before moving to Oslo. Since 2004 she has been a naturalised citizen of Norway.

Nordenstam set a European record in the heats of the 200 meters breaststroke at the 2008 Summer Olympics in Beijing. In the final she took the bronze medal with a new European record of 2:23,02, making her the first Norwegian woman to win an Olympic swimming medal.

Nordenstam has 16 Norwegian championship medals.

Nordenstam studied advertising and marketing in the United States and received a bachelor's degree. Nordenstam is a resident of Lambertseter in Oslo.

== See also ==
- List of Norwegian records in swimming
