= Australia at the 2007 World Aquatics Championships =

- Flag of Australia
- FINA code: AUS
- National federation: Swimming Australia
- Website: swimming.org.au

in Melbourne, Australia
- Medals Ranked 3rd: Gold 9 Silver 9 Bronze 8 Total 26

World Aquatics Championships appearances
- 1973; 1975; 1978; 1982; 1986; 1991; 1994; 1998; 2001; 2003; 2005; 2007; 2009; 2011; 2013; 2015; 2017; 2019; 2022; 2023; 2024

Australia competed at the 2007 World Aquatics Championships in Melbourne, Australia from 17 March to 1 April 2007.

== Medalists ==
Medal	Name	Sport	Event	Date
Gold	Sally Foster^{[a]} Jodie Henry; Libby Lenton; Danni Miatke^{[a]} Shayne Reese; Melanie Schlanger	Swimming	Women's 4 × 100 m freestyle relay	25 March
Gold	Libby Lenton	Swimming	Women's 100 m butterfly	26 March
Gold	Leisel Jones	Swimming	Women's 100 m breaststroke	27 March
Gold	Jessicah Schipper	Swimming	Women's 200 m butterfly	29 March
Gold	Libby Lenton	Swimming	Women's 100 m freestyle	30 March
Gold	Leisel Jones	Swimming	Women's 200 m breaststroke	30 March
Gold	Felicity Galvez^{[a]} Jodie Henry^{[a]} Leisel Jones; Libby Lenton; Jessicah Schipper; Emily Seebohm; Tarnee White^{[a]}	Swimming	Women's 4 × 100 m medley relay	31 March
Gold	Libby Trickett	Swimming	Women's 50 m freestyle	1 April
Gold	Michael Klim^{[a]} Andrew Lauterstein; Kenrick Monk^{[a]} Brenton Rickard; Hayden Stoeckel^{[a]} Eamon Sullivan; Matt Welsh	Swimming	Men's 4 × 100 m medley relay	1 April
Silver	Briony Cole; Melissa Wu	Diving	Women's synchronized 10 m platform	19 March
Silver	Grant Hackett	Swimming	Men's 400 m freestyle	25 March
Silver	Jessicah Schipper	Swimming	Women's 100 m butterfly	26 March
Silver	Craig Stevens	Swimming	Men's 800 m freestyle	28 March
Silver	Brenton Rickard	Swimming	Men's 200 m breaststroke	30 March
Silver	Grant Brits; Nick Ffrost^{[a]} Andrew Mewing; Kenrick Monk; Patrick Murphy	Swimming	Men's 4 × 200 m freestyle relay	30 March
Silver	Australia women's national water polo team: Gemma Beadsworth; Nikita Cuffe; Suzie Fraser; Taniele Gofers; Kate Gynther; Gemma Hadley; Amy Hetzel; Bronwen Knox; Emma Knox; Alicia McCormack; Melissa Rippon; Rebecca Rippon; Mia Santoromito	Water polo	Women's tournament	31 March
Silver	Danni Miatke	Swimming	Women's 50 m butterfly	31 March
Silver	Leisel Jones	Swimming	Women's 50 m breaststroke	1 April
Bronze	Kate Brookes-Peterson	Open water swimming	Women's 5 km	18 March
Bronze	Kate Brookes-Peterson	Open water swimming	Women's 10 km	20 March
Bronze	Briony Cole; Sharleen Stratton	Diving	Women's synchronized 3 m platform	26 March
Bronze	Brenton Rickard	Swimming	Men's 100 m breaststroke	26 March
Bronze	Stephanie Rice	Swimming	Women's 200 m individual medley	26 March
Bronze	Eamon Sullivan	Swimming	Men's 100 m freestyle	29 March
Bronze	Tayliah Zimmer	Swimming	Women's 50 m backstroke	29 March
Bronze	Stephanie Rice	Swimming	Women's 400 m individual medley	1 April

== Diving ==
Australia entered a team of seven divers.

Men

Athlete	Event	Preliminaries		Semifinals		Final	
Athlete	Event	Points	Rank	Points	Rank	Points	Rank
Grant Nel	1 m springboard	323.55	22	Did not advance			
Scott Robertson	3 m springboard	329.25	17 Q	319.25	17	Did not advance	
Peter Hill	10 m platform	390.50	15 Q	371.70	17	Did not advance	
Scott Robertson	10 m platform	382.80	17 Q	330.50	18	Did not advance	
Grant Nel; Scott Robertson	3 m synchronised	371.40	12 Q	—		389.55	7
Peter Hill; Scott Robertson	10 m synchronised	372.30	10 Q	—		365.10	12

Women

Athlete	Event	Preliminaries		Semifinals		Final	
Athlete	Event	Points	Rank	Points	Rank	Points	Rank
Alex Croak	1 m springboard	232.55	18	Did not advance			
Sharleen Stratton	1 m springboard	256.15	10 Q	259.70	4	Did not advance	
Briony Cole	3 m springboard	267.00	18 Q	297.00	10 Q	274.95	12
Sharleen Stratton	3 m springboard	320.80	3 Q	255.70	18	Did not advance	
Alex Croak	10 m platform	265.70	20	Did not advance			
Melissa Wu	10 m platform	328.85	7	352.00	4 Q	282.15	11
Briony Cole; Sharleen Stratton	3 m synchronised	309.66	2 Q	—		313.14	3rd place, bronze medalist(s)
Briony Cole; Melissa Wu	10 m synchronised	326.22	2 Q	—		324.00	2nd place, silver medalist(s)

== Open water swimming ==
Men

Athlete	Event	Time	Rank
David Browne	5 km	57:11.5	7
Ky Hurst	5 km	57:11.5	=10
Ky Hurst	10 km	1:56:17.62	22
Josh Santacaterina	10 km	1:56:04.45	13
Brendan Capell	25 km	5:32:41.97	11
Josh Santacaterina	25 km	5:20:55.89	5

Women

Athlete	Event	Time	Rank
Alexandra Bagley	5 km	1:00:58.5	18
Kate Brookes-Peterson	5 km	1:00:47.6	3rd place, bronze medalist(s)
Alexandra Bagley	10 km	2:05:32.9	14
Kate Brookes-Peterson	10 km	2:03:59.5	3rd place, bronze medalist(s)
Shelley Clark	25 km	5:47:24.88	7

== Swimming ==
Men

Athlete	Event	Preliminaries		Semifinals		Final	
Athlete	Event	Time	Rank	Time	Rank	Time	Rank
Ashley Callus	50 m freestyle	22.55	14 Q	22.63	15	Did not advance	
Eamon Sullivan	50 m freestyle	22.06	2 Q	22.19	5 Q	22.05	5
Ashley Callus	100 m freestyle	49.43	=12 Q	49.45	16	Did not advance	
Eamon Sullivan	100 m freestyle	49.20	7 Q	48.86	5 Q	48.47	3rd place, bronze medalist(s)
Kenrick Monk	200 m freestyle	1:48.00	4 Q	1:47.45	4 Q	1:47.12	4
Patrick Murphy	200 m freestyle	1:49.01	13 Q	1:48.75	13	Did not advance	
Grant Hackett	400 m freestyle	3:48.72	8 Q	—		3:45.43	2nd place, silver medalist(s)
Craig Stevens	400 m freestyle	3:46.96	5 Q	—		3:48.26	6
Grant Hackett	800 m freestyle	7:51.86	5 Q	—		7:55.39	6
Craig Stevens	800 m freestyle	7:50.72	1 Q	—		7:48.67	2nd place, silver medalist(s)
Grant Hackett	1500 m freestyle	14:59.24	5 Q	—		14:59.59	7
Craig Stevens	1500 m freestyle	15:02.16	8 Q	—		14:59.11	6
Hayden Stoeckel	50 m backstroke	26.38	21	Did not advance			
Matt Welsh	50 m backstroke	25.93	9 Q	25.76	8 Q	25.61	8
Hayden Stoeckel	100 m backstroke	55.64	17 Q	55.51	16	Did not advance	
Matt Welsh	100 m backstroke	55.50	14 Q	54.92	8 Q	54.65	7
Ephraim Hannant	200 m backstroke	2:00.31	10 Q	2:00.95	13	Did not advance	
Hayden Stoeckel	200 m backstroke	2:02.32	24	Did not advance			
Adam Lucas	50 m breaststroke	29.84	56	Did not advance			
Brenton Rickard	50 m breaststroke	27.80	5 Q	27.98	6 Q	28.24	7
Jim Piper	100 m breaststroke	1:02.36	27	Did not advance			
Brenton Rickard	100 m breaststroke	1:01.06	=7 Q	1:00.87	4 Q	1:00.58	3rd place, bronze medalist(s)
Jim Piper	200 m breaststroke	2:12.94	6 Q	2:13.40	10	Did not advance	
Brenton Rickard	200 m breaststroke	2:13.17	11 Q	2:11.41	=2 Q	2:10.99	2nd place, silver medalist(s)
Adam Pine	50 m butterfly	24.60	36	Did not advance			
Matt Welsh	50 m butterfly	23.95	9 Q	24.41	16	Did not advance	
Andrew Lauterstein	100 m butterfly	52.63	11 Q	52.99	15	Did not advance	
Adam Pine	100 m butterfly	53.33	20	Did not advance			
Nick D'Arcy	200 m butterfly	1:57.88	14 Q	1:57.15	12	Did not advance	
Travis Nederpelt	200 m butterfly	1:57.14	=7 Q	1:57.71	13	Did not advance	
Leith Brodie	200 m individual medley	2:01.66	13 Q	2:00.77	10	Did not advance	
Adam Lucas	200 m individual medley	2:02.10	15 Q	2:02.33	13	Did not advance	
Adam Lucas	400 m individual medley	4:26.45	25	—		Did not advance	
Travis Nederpelt	400 m individual medley	4:20.22	13	—		Did not advance	
Ashley Callus; Andrew Lauterstein; Michael Klim^{[a]} Kenrick Monk; Patrick Murphy^{[a]} Eamon Sullivan	4 × 100 m freestyle relay	3:16.46	4 Q	—		3:15.89	5
Grant Brits; Nick Ffrost^{[a]} Andrew Mewing; Kenrick Monk; Patrick Murphy	4 × 200 m freestyle relay	7:14.84	2 Q	—		7:10.05	2nd place, silver medalist(s)
Michael Klim^{[a]} Andrew Lauterstein; Kenrick Monk^{[a]} Brenton Rickard; Hayden Stoeckel^{[a]} Eamon Sullivan; Matt Welsh	4 × 100 m medley relay	3:38.58	4 Q	—		3:34.93	1st place, gold medalist(s)

Women

Athlete	Event	Preliminaries		Semifinals		Final	
Athlete	Event	Time	Rank	Time	Rank	Time	Rank
Jodie Henry	50 m freestyle	25.42	6 Q	25.06	=5 Q	24.96	6
Libby Lenton	50 m freestyle	25.24	2 Q	24.89	4 Q	24.53	1st place, gold medalist(s)
Jodie Henry	100 m freestyle	54.76	6 Q	54.23	6 Q	54.21	6
Libby Lenton	100 m freestyle	54.32	3 Q	53.85	2 Q	53.40 CR	1st place, gold medalist(s)
Bronte Barratt	200 m freestyle	1:59.26	10 Q	1:59.12	10	Did not advance	
Linda Mackenzie	200 m freestyle	1:58.80	6 Q	1:59.25	12	Did not advance	
Bronte Barratt	400 m freestyle	4:08.99	10	—		Did not advance	
Linda Mackenzie	400 m freestyle	4:07.26	5 Q	—		4:07.64	8
Kylie Palmer	800 m freestyle	8:29.36	3 Q	—		8:34.96	8
Stephanie Williams	800 m freestyle	8:39.68	18	—		Did not advance	
Emily Seebohm	50 m backstroke	28.93	=7 Q	29.04	14	Did not advance	
Tayliah Zimmer	50 m backstroke	29.00	=9 Q	28.78	7 Q	28.50	3rd place, bronze medalist(s)
Emily Seebohm	100 m backstroke	1:01.70	9 Q	1:00.51 AR	1 Q	1:00.52	4
Tayliah Zimmer	100 m backstroke	1:01.38	7 Q	1:01.06	6 Q	1:02.68	8
Frances Adcock	200 m backstroke	2:11.70	7 Q	2:12.04	11	Did not advance	
Joanna Fargus	200 m backstroke	2:11.50	6 Q	2:13.22	14	Did not advance	
Leisel Jones	50 m breaststroke	31.39	=3 Q	30.91	1 Q	30.70	2nd place, silver medalist(s)
Tarnee White	50 m breaststroke	31.65	6 Q	31.14	3 Q	31.14	4
Leisel Jones	100 m breaststroke	1:07.53	2 Q	1:07.13	2 Q	1:05.72 CR	1st place, gold medalist(s)
Tarnee White	100 m breaststroke	1:08.97	7 Q	1:08.37	7 Q	1:08.55	6
Sally Foster	200 m breaststroke	2:30.85	18	Did not advance			
Leisel Jones	200 m breaststroke	2:27.10	3 Q	2:23.75	1 Q	2:21.84	1st place, gold medalist(s)
Libby Lenton	50 m butterfly	27.36	18	Did not advance			
Danni Miatke	50 m butterfly	26.34	1 Q	26.57	4 Q	26.05	2nd place, silver medalist(s)
Libby Lenton	100 m butterfly	58.93	7 Q	57.78	2 Q	57.15	1st place, gold medalist(s)
Jessicah Schipper	100 m butterfly	58.52	3 Q	57.57	1 Q	57.24	2nd place, silver medalist(s)
Felicity Galvez	200 m butterfly	2:09.67	7 Q	2:09.49	9	Did not advance	
Jessicah Schipper	200 m butterfly	2:09.83	9 Q	2:07.72	1 Q	2:06.39	1st place, gold medalist(s)
Shayne Reese	200 m individual medley	2:13.67	4 Q	2:14.10	6 Q	2:14.89	6
Stephanie Rice	200 m individual medley	2:14.18	5 Q	2:12.54	3 Q	2:11.42	3rd place, bronze medalist(s)
Jennifer Reilly	400 m individual medley	4:40.12	2 Q	—		4:41.53	4
Stephanie Rice	400 m individual medley	4:43.85	6 Q	—		4:41.19	3rd place, bronze medalist(s)
Sally Foster^{[a]} Jodie Henry; Libby Lenton; Danni Miatke^{[a]} Shayne Reese; Melanie Schlanger	4 × 100 m freestyle relay	3:40.04	3 Q	—		3:35.48 CR	1st place, gold medalist(s)
Bronte Barratt^{[a]} Lara Davenport; Jodie Henry; Libby Lenton; Linda Mackenzie^{[a]} Stephanie Rice	4 × 200 m freestyle relay	7:57.50	1 Q	—		7:56.42	4
Felicity Galvez^{[a]} Jodie Henry^{[a]} Leisel Jones; Libby Lenton; Jessicah Schipper; Emily Seebohm; Tarnee White^{[a]}	4 × 100 m medley relay	4:02.01	2 Q	—		3:55.74 WR	1st place, gold medalist(s)

^{a} Swimmers who participated in the heats only.

== Synchronised swimming ==
Women

Athlete	Event	Preliminaries		Final	
Athlete	Event	Points	Rank	Points	Rank
Tarren Otte	Solo technical	78.6660	21	Did not advance	
Dannielle Liesch	Solo free	81.0000	21	Did not advance	
Dannielle Liesch; Tarren Otte	Duet technical	61.3330	26	Did not advance	
Eloise Amberger; Sarah Bombell	Duet free	81.000	26	Did not advance	
Eloise Amberger; Sarah Bombell; Tamika Domrow; Bianca Hammett; Dannielle Liesch; Tarren Otte; Samantha Reid; Bethany Walsh	Team technical	80.3330	15	Did not advance	
Eloise Amberger; Coral Bentley; Sarah Bombell; Tamika Domrow; Dannielle Liesch; Tarren Otte; Samantha Reid; Bethany Walsh	Team free	82.6670	15	Did not advance	
Eloise Amberger; Coral Bentley; Sarah Bombell; Amber Bourke; Tamika Domrow; Bianca Hammett; Dannielle Liesch; Tarren Otte; Samantha Reid; Bethany Walsh	Team free combination	83.1660	12 Q	84.5000	12

== Water polo ==
Summary

Key:
- FT – After full time.
- P – Match decided by penalty-shootout.

Team	Event	Group stage				Playoff	Quarterfinal	Semifinal	Final / BM	
Team	Event	Opposition Score	Opposition Score	Opposition Score	Rank	Opposition Score	Opposition Score	Opposition Score	Opposition Score	Rank
Australia men's	Men's tournament	United States; L 3–9	Croatia; L 9–10	South Africa; W 12–6	3 PO	Italy; L 11–12	Did not advance	9th–12th place Romania; W 15–9	9th place game United States; L 9–10	10
Australia women's	Women's tournament	Canada; W 5–4	Puerto Rico; W 26–1	Brazil; W 11–3	1 QF	Bye	Italy; W 12–8	Russia; W 12–9	United States; L 5–6	2nd place, silver medalist(s)
