= Swimming at the 2007 World Aquatics Championships – Women's 100 metre breaststroke =

The Women's 100m Breaststroke at the 2007 World Aquatics Championships took place on 26 March (prelims & semifinals) and the evening of 27 March (finals) at the Rod Laver Arena in Melbourne, Australia. 72 swimmers were entered in the event, of which 70 swam.

Existing records at the start of the event were:

- World Record (WR): 1:05.09, Leisel Jones (Australia), 20 March 2006 in Melbourne, Australia.
- Championship Record (CR): 1:06.20, Jessica Hardy (USA), Montreal 2005 (25 July 2005)

== Results ==
=== Finals ===
Place	Name	Nationality	Time	Note
1st	Leisel Jones	Australia	1:05.72	CR
2nd	Tara Kirk	USA	1:06.34	
3rd	Anna Khlistunova	Ukraine	1:07.27	ER =
4th	Jessica Hardy	USA	1:07.38	
5th	Kirsty Balfour	Great Britain	1:08.05	
6th	Tarnee White	Australia	1:08.55	
7th	Kate Haywood	Great Britain	1:08.72	
8th	Elena Bogomazova	Russia	1:08.96	

=== Semifinals ===
Rank	Swimmer	Nation	Time	Note
1	Tara Kirk	USA	1:06.72	Q
2	Leisel Jones	Australia	1:07.13	Q
3	Anna Khlistunova	Ukraine	1:07.49	Q
4	Kirsty Balfour	Great Britain	1:07.67	Q
5	Jessica Hardy	USA	1:07.92	Q
6	Elena Bogomazova	Russia	1:08.04	Q
7	Tarnee White	Australia	1:08.37	Q
8	Kate Haywood	Great Britain	1:08.49	Q
9	Anne-Sophie Le Paranthoën	France	1:08.68	NR
10	Hanna Westrin	Sweden	1:09.07	
11	Asami Kitagawa	Japan	1:09.11	
12	Rebecca Ejdervik	Sweden	1:09.39	
13	Ina Kapishina	Belarus	1:09.41	
14	Birte Steven	Germany	1:09.46	
15	Anne-Mari Gulbrandsen	Norway	1:09.50	
16	Janne Schafer	Germany	1:10.32	

=== Preliminaries ===
Rank	Swimmer	Nation	Time	Note
1	Tara Kirk	USA	1:07.23	Q
2	Leisel Jones	Australia	1:07.53	Q
3	Anna Khlistunova	Ukraine	1:07.66	Q
4	Hanna Westrin	Sweden	1:08.30	Q
5	Jessica Hardy	USA	1:08.68	Q
6	Anne-Sophie Le Paranthoën	France	1:08.78	Q
7	Tarnee White	Australia	1:08.97	Q
8	Elena Bogomazova	Russia	1:09.11	Q
8	Kate Haywood	Great Britain	1:09.11	Q
10	Kirsty Balfour	Great Britain	1:09.13	Q
11	Ina Kapishina	Belarus	1:09.16	Q
12	Rebecca Ejdervik	Sweden	1:09.69	Q
13	Anne-Mari Gulbrandsen	Norway	1:09.70	Q
14	Birte Steven	Germany	1:09.77	Q
15	Janne Schafer	Germany	1:09.80	Q
16	Asami Kitagawa	Japan	1:09.87	Q
17	Mirna Jukić	Austria	1:09.92	
18	Beata Kaminska	Poland	1:10.05	
19	Roberta Panara	Italy	1:10.18	
20	Yoshimi Miwa	Japan	1:10.24	
21	Annabelle Carey	New Zealand	1:10.30	
22	CHEN Huijia	China	1:10.39	
23	Chiara Boggiatto	Italy	1:10.41	
24	Yuliya Pidlisna	Ukraine	1:10.63	
25	Suzaan van Biljon	South Africa	1:10.77	
26	Seul Ki Jung	South Korea	1:10.95	
27	JI Liping	China	1:11.08	
28	Diana Gomes	Portugal	1:11.18	
29	Ciara Farrell	Ireland	1:11.49	
30	Camille Muffat	France	1:12.24	
31	Su Yeon Back	South Korea	1:12.42	
32	Adriana Marmolejo	Mexico	1:12.45	
33	Jaclyn Marissa Pangilinan	Philippines	1:12.67	
34	Louise Mai Jansen	Denmark	1:12.83	
35	Marina Kuc	Montenegro	1:12.85	
36	Sara Elbekri	Morocco	1:13.28	
37	Man Yi Yvette Kong	Hong Kong	1:13.77	
38	Daniela Victoria	Venezuela	1:14.21	
39	Valeria Silva	Peru	1:14.26	
40	Anastasia Christoforou	Cyprus	1:15.06	
41	I Chuan Chen	Chinese Taipei	1:16.32	
42	Lina Cahya Utami	Indonesia	1:16.43	
43	Desak Nyoman Rina	Indonesia	1:16.60	
44	Roanne Ho	Singapore	1:16.86	
45	Nilshaira Isenia	Netherlands Antilles	1:18.12	
46	Chun Hui Khoonnie Liang	Singapore	1:18.39	
47	Danielle Beaubrun	Saint Lucia	1:18.42	
48	On Kei Lei	Macao	1:18.73	
49	Thi Thuan Tran	Vietnam	1:18.80	
50	Katerine Moreno	Bolivia	1:18.85	
51	Natasha Moodie	Jamaica	1:19.02	
52	Dohi Eliane Droubry	Côte d'Ivoire	1:19.62	
53	Rachel Ah Koy	Fiji	1:19.72	
54	Chinyere Pigot	Suriname	1:19.93	
55	Blessing Forcados	Nigeria	1:19.95	
56	Karen Poujol Zepeda	Honduras	1:20.38	
57	Hernantenaina Ravoajanahary	Madagascar	1:20.40	
58	Thi Hue Pham	Vietnam	1:20.78	
59	Cai Lin Khoo	Malaysia	1:20.82	
60	Rachel Lannen	Guam	1:20.82	
61	Nibal Yamout	Lebanon	1:20.98	
62	Sin Ian Lei	Macao	1:21.08	
63	Ann Salnikova	Georgia	1:22.69	
64	Oksana Hatamkhanova	Azerbaijan	1:23.07	
65	Stacey Ryder	Swaziland	1:23.47	
66	Kelly How Tam Fat	Mauritius	1:24.04	
67	Monica Fernandovna Bernardo	Mozambique	1:24.22	
68	Samantha La Qua	Grenada	1:25.10	
69	Rovena Marku	Albania	1:26.04	
70	Aminath Inas Ismail	Maldives	1:45.03	
--	Mahfuza Khatun	Bangladesh	DNS	
--	Doli Akhter	Bangladesh	DNS	

== See also ==
- Swimming at the 2005 World Aquatics Championships – Women's 100 m breaststroke
- Swimming at the 2006 Commonwealth Games - Women's 100 metres breaststroke
- Swimming at the 2008 Summer Olympics – Women's 100 metre breaststroke
