= Swimming at the 2007 World Aquatics Championships – Women's 50 metre breaststroke =

The Women's 50m Breaststroke at the 2007 World Aquatics Championships took place on 31 March (prelims & semifinals) and the evening of 1 April (finals) at the Rod Laver Arena in Melbourne, Australia. 86 swimmers were entered in the event, of which 74 swam.

Existing records at the start of the event were:

- World Record (WR): 30.31, Jade Edmistone (Australia), 30 January 2006 in Melbourne, Australia.
- Championship Record (CR): 30.45, Jade Edmistone (Australia), Montreal 2005 (31 July 2005)

== Results ==
=== Finals ===
Place	Name	Nationality	Time	Note
1st	Jessica Hardy	USA	30.63	
2nd	Leisel Jones	Australia	30.70	
3rd	Tara Kirk	USA	31.05	
4th	Tarnee White	Australia	31.14	
5th	Janne Schafer	Germany	31.35	
6th	Zoë Baker	New Zealand	31.79	
7th	Kate Haywood	Great Britain	31.82	
8th	Rebecca Ejdervik	Sweden	31.86	

=== Semifinals ===
Rank	Swimmer	Nation	Time	Note
1	Leisel Jones	Australia	30.91	Q
2	Jessica Hardy	USA	31.09	Q
3	Tarnee White	Australia	31.14	Q
4	Janne Schafer	Germany	31.23	Q
5	Tara Kirk	USA	31.27	Q
6	Zoë Baker	New Zealand	31.49	Q
7	Rebecca Ejdervik	Sweden	31.71	Q
8	Kate Haywood	Great Britain	31.72	Q
9	Ji Liping	China	31.75	
10	Mirna Jukić	Austria	31.78	
11	Elena Bogomazova	Russia	32.08	
12	Roberta Panara	Italy	32.10	
13	Anna Khlistunova	Ukraine	32.12	
14	Anne-Sophie Le Paranthoën	France	32.17	
15	Anne-Mari Gulbrandsen	Norway	32.34	NR
--	Ina Kapishina	Belarus	DQ	

=== Preliminaries ===
Rank	Swimmer	Nation	Time	Note
1	Jessica Hardy	USA	30.85	Q
2	Zoë Baker	New Zealand	31.35	Q
3	Leisel Jones	Australia	31.39	Q
3	Tara Kirk	USA	31.39	Q
5	Rebecca Ejdervik	Sweden	31.54	Q
6	Tarnee White	Australia	31.65	Q
7	Anna Khlistunova	Ukraine	31.73	Q, NR
8	Janne Schafer	Germany	31.77	Q
9	Anne-Sophie Le Paranthoën	France	31.84	Q
10	Ina Kapishina	Belarus	31.93	Q
11	Kate Haywood	Great Britain	31.95	Q
12	Mirna Jukić	Austria	32.06	Q
13	Roberta Panara	Italy	32.17	Q
14	Ji Liping	China	32.25	Q
15	Anne-Mari Gulbrandsen	Norway	32.35	Q, NR
16	Elena Bogomazova	Russia	32.51	Q
17	Annabelle Carey	New Zealand	32.60	
18	Yoshimi Miwa	Japan	32.63	
19	Ciara Farrell	Ireland	32.69	
19	Hanna Westrin	Sweden	32.69	
21	Beata Kaminska	Poland	32.81	
22	Suzaan van Biljon	South Africa	32.87	
22	Chen Huijia	China	32.87	
24	Veronica Vdovicenco	Moldova	33.31	
24	Diana Gomes	Portugal	33.31	
26	Valeria Silva	Peru	33.32	
27	Yuliya Pidlisna	Ukraine	33.88	
28	Sara Elbekri	Morocco	34.11	
29	Anastasia Christoforou	Cyprus	34.35	
30	Man Yi Yvette Kong	Hong Kong	34.36	
31	Marina Kuc	Montenegro	34.41	
32	I Chuan Chen	Chinese Taipei	34.48	
33	Roanne Ho	Singapore	34.52	
34	Larisa Lăcustă	Romania	34.58	
35	Koh Ting Ting	Singapore	35.06	
36	Daniela Victoria	Venezuela	35.38	
37	Danielle Beaubrun	Saint Lucia	35.42	
38	Desak Nyoman Rina	Indonesia	35.43	
39	Rachel Ah Koy	Fiji	35.44	
40	On Kei Lei	Macao	35.69	
41	Nilshaira Isenia	Netherlands Antilles	35.77	
42	Lina Cahya Utami	Indonesia	35.79	
43	Dohi Eliane Droubry	Côte d'Ivoire	36.06	
44	Natasha Moodie	Jamaica	36.08	
45	Herinantenaina Ravoajanahary	Madagascar	36.19	
46	Thi Thuan Tran	Vietnam	36.72	
47	Sin Ian Lei	Macao	36.73	
48	Olga Gnedovskaya	Uzbekistan	36.81	
49	Saintsetseg Dashtseren	Mongolia	36.99	
50	Blessing Forcados	Nigeria	37.01	
51	Karen Poujol Zepeda	Honduras	37.25	
52	Katerine Moreno	Bolivia	37.29	
53	Oksana Hatamkhanova	Azerbaijan	37.31	
54	Thi Hue Pham	Vietnam	37.36	
55	Cai Lin Khoo	Malaysia	37.49	
56	Nibal Yamout	Lebanon	37.61	
57	Rachel Lannen	Guam	37.63	
58	Kelly How Tam Fat	Mauritius	37.88	
59	Monica Fernandovna Bernardo	Mozambique	37.95	
60	Mercedes Milner	Zambia	38.12	
60	Chinyere Pigot	Suriname	38.12	
62	Stacey Ryder	Swaziland	38.34	
63	Razan Taha	Jordan	38.38	
64	Rovena Marku	Albania	38.64	
65	Samantha La Qua	Grenada	39.04	
66	Sainzaya Khurelbaatar	Mongolia	40.16	
67	Bibidha Rimal	Nepal	41.23	
68	Natasha Ratter	Uganda	41.42	
69	Debra Daniel	(Federated States of Micronesia) FS Micronesia	42.35	
70	Anisa Curraj	Albania	42.56	
71	Julianne Kirchner	Marshall Islands	43.66	
72	Pamela Girimbazi Rugabira	Rwanda	47.27	
73	Aminath Inas Ismail	Maldives	48.10	
74	Ingrid Fabienne Outtara	Burkina Faso	48.51	
--	Kezimani Liesse	Burundi	DNS	
--	Gloria Koussihouede	Benin	DNS	
--	Mahfuza Khatun	Bangladesh	DNS	
--	Doli Akhter	Bangladesh	DNS	
--	Adriana Marmolejo	Mexico	DNS	
--	Asami Kitagawa	Japan	DNS	
--	Kirsty Balfour	Great Britain	DNS	
--	Elisabeth Nikiema	Burkina Faso	DNS	
