= Swimming at the 2007 World Aquatics Championships – Women's 200 metre breaststroke =

The Women's 200m Breaststroke at the 2007 World Aquatics Championships took place on 29 March (prelims & semifinals) and the evening of 30 March (finals) at the Rod Laver Arena in Melbourne, Australia. 55 swimmers were entered in the event, of which 54 swam.

Existing records at the start of the event were:

- World Record (WR): 2:20.54, Leisel Jones (Australia), 1 February 2006 in Melbourne, Australia.
- Championship Record (CR): 2:21.72, Leisel Jones (Australia), Montreal 2005 (29 July 2005)

== Results ==
=== Finals ===
Place	Name	Nationality	Time	Note
1st	Leisel Jones	Australia	2:21.84	
2nd	Kirsty Balfour	Great Britain	2:25.94	
2nd	Megan Jendrick	USA	2:25.94	
4th	Suzaan van Biljon	South Africa	2:26.19	
5th	LUO Nan	China	2:27.55	
6th	Birte Steven	Germany	2:28.13	
7th	Sandra Jacobson	Sweden	2:28.25	
8th	Tara Kirk	USA	2:28.67	

=== Semifinals ===
Rank	Swimmer	Nation	Time	Note
1	Leisel Jones	Australia	2:23.75	Q
2	Kirsty Balfour	Great Britain	2:25.45	Q
3	Suzaan van Biljon	South Africa	2:25.56	Q
4	Megan Jendrick	USA	2:26.14	Q
5	LUO Nan	China	2:27.03	Q
6	Sandra Jacobson	Sweden	2:27.24	Q
7	Tara Kirk	USA	2:27.41	Q
8	Birte Steven	Germany	2:27.62	Q
9	Seul Ki Jung	South Korea	2:27.83	
10	Hanna Westrin	Sweden	2:28.55	
11	Asami Kitagawa	Japan	2:28.61	
12	Mirna Jukić	Austria	2:29.40	
13	Anna Khlistunova	Ukraine	2:30.12	
14	QI Hui	China	2:30.45	
15	Yuliya Pidlisna	Ukraine	2:31.21	
16	Beata Kaminska	Poland	2:31.42	

=== Preliminaries ===
Rank	Swimmer	Nation	Time	Note
1	Suzaan van Biljon	South Africa	2:27.03	Q
2	Sandra Jacobson	Sweden	2:27.08	Q
3	Leisel Jones	Australia	2:27.10	Q
4	Birte Steven	Germany	2:27.85	Q
5	Seul Ki Jung	South Korea	2:27.90	Q
6	Tara Kirk	USA	2:28.50	Q
7	Kirsty Balfour	Great Britain	2:28.53	Q
8	Megan Jendrick	USA	2:28.71	Q
9	Hanna Westrin	Sweden	2:28.95	Q
10	Asami Kitagawa	Japan	2:29.34	Q
11	Anna Khlistunova	Ukraine	2:29.38	Q
12	LUO Nan	China	2:29.54	Q
13	QI Hui	China	2:30.05	Q
14	Yuliya Pidlisna	Ukraine	2:30.17	Q
15	Mirna Jukić	Austria	2:30.45	Q
16	Beata Kaminska	Poland	2:30.61	Q
17	Anna-Mari Gulbrandsen	Norway	2:30.84	
18	Sally Foster	Australia	2:30.85	
19	Ina Kapishina	Belarus	2:31.02	
20	Anne Poleska	Germany	2:31.24	
21	Sophie de Ronchi	France	2:31.30	
22	Chiara Boggiatto	Italy	2:31.49	
23	Marina Kuc	Montenegro	2:32.59	
23	Elena Bogomazova	Russia	2:32.59	
25	Su Yeon Back	South Korea	2:32.61	
26	Diana Gomes	Portugal	2:33.14	
27	Annabelle Carey	New Zealand	2:34.31	
28	Yoshimi Miwa	Japan	2:34.58	
29	Jaclyn Marissa Pangilinan	Philippines	2:36.24	
30	Sara Elbekri	Morocco	2:36.28	
31	Adriana Marmolejo	Mexico	2:37.07	
32	Ciara Farrell	Ireland	2:37.18	
33	Man Yi Yvette Kong	Hong Kong	2:41.45	
34	Anastasia Christoforou	Cyprus	2:41.94	
35	Cheryl Lim	Singapore	2:42.52	
36	Lina Cahya Utami	Indonesia	2:42.77	
37	Daniela Victoria	Venezuela	2:42.87	
38	Man Hsu Lin	Chinese Taipei	2:45.47	
39	Desak Nyoman Rina	Indonesia	2:47.34	
40	On Kei Lei	Macao	2:49.06	
41	Chun Hui Khoonnie Liang	Singapore	2:49.57	
42	Thi Thuan Tran	Vietnam	2:49.65	
43	I Chuan Chen	Chinese Taipei	2:49.85	
44	Katerine Moreno	Bolivia	2:49.99	
45	Chinyere Pigot	Suriname	2:50.26	
46	Sin Ian Lei	Macao	2:50.54	
47	Ranohon Amanova	Uzbekistan	2:51.50	
48	Nibal Yamout	Lebanon	2:51.71	
49	Oksana Hatamkhanova	Azerbaijan	2:54.27	
50	Blessing Forcados	Nigeria	2:54.38	
51	Ann Salnikova	Georgia	2:55.08	
52	Thi Hue Pham	Vietnam	2:55.35	
53	Karen Poujol Zepeda	Honduras	2:58.37	
54	Kelly How Tam Fat	Mauritius	3:00.29	
--	Louise Mai Jansen	Denmark	DNS	

== See also ==
- Swimming at the 2005 World Aquatics Championships – Women's 200 metre breaststroke
- Swimming at the 2006 Commonwealth Games - Women's 200 metres breaststroke
- Swimming at the 2008 Summer Olympics – Women's 200 metre breaststroke
