= Coral Bentley =

Australian synchronised swimmer

Personal information
- Nationality: Australian
- Born: 30 December 1984 (age 41) Dandenong, Victoria
- Height: 1.67 m (5 ft 6 in)
- Weight: 55 kg (121 lb)

Sport
- Country: Australia
- Sport: Synchronized swimming
- Event: Team
- Club: Dandenong Dolphins
- Coached by: Anna Nepotacheva, Marina Kholod
- Retired: 2008

Coral Bentley (born 30 December 1984 in Dandenong, Victoria) is a retired Australian synchronized swimmer who competed in the 2008 Summer Olympics.

== Personal life ==
Bentley was born on 30 December 1984 in Dandenong, Victoria. Bentley is 1.67 m (5 ft 5 1/2 in) tall and weighs 55 kg (121 lb; 8 st 9 lb). As of 2008, Bentley lives in Melbourne, Victoria.

== Synchronised Swimming ==
Bentley was a synchronised swimmer, who began the sport at age 11 in 1996. After reading about synchronised swimming in a newspaper, she joined the Dandenong Dolphins club.

Bentley was a member of the Australian National Junior Team in 2001 and 2002 and went on to the National Team in 2003. She competed for Australia at the 2005 World Championships in Montreal. In 2004, Bentley went to Japan with her duet partner for two months and performed in a circus called Aqua Life. She traveled to Japan in 2005 for the Synchro World Cup. In 2007, Bentley was part of Australia's free combination routine at the 2007 FINA World Championships.

In 2008, Bentley qualified to represent Australia with Eloise Amberger, Sarah Bombell, Tamika Domrow, Myriam Glez, Erika Leal-Ramirez, Tarren Otte, Samantha Reid and Bethany Walsh in the team event at Beijing 2008. Australia placed seventh out of eight teams.

Bentley retired from synchronised swimming at the age of 23, due to the financial difficulties involved in competing in the sport.
