= Eloise Amberger =

Australian synchronized swimmer

Personal information
- Nickname: Ella
- Nationality: Australian
- Born: 28 January 1987 (age 39) Brisbane, Queensland, Australia
- Height: 1.65 m (5 ft 5 in)
- Weight: 55 kg (121 lb)

Sport
- Country: Australia
- Sport: Synchronised swimming
- Club: Gold Coast Mermaids
- Coached by: Anna Nepotacheva, Marina Kholod
Medal record
Representing Australia
Synchronised swimming
Commonwealth Games
Bronze medal – third place	2010 Delhi	Women's duet

Eloise Michelle Amberger (born 28 January 1987 in Brisbane, Queensland, Australia) is an Australian synchronized swimmer. Amberger made her international debut for Australia's National Junior Team in 2002 at the World Junior Synchronised Swimming Championships in Montreal, and joined Australia's National Team two years later in 2004. Amberger is a dual Olympian, having competed in the 2008 Summer Olympics in Beijing and the 2012 Summer Olympics in London, and is a Commonwealth Games bronze medalist, having claimed third place overall in the duet event with Sarah Bombell at the 2010 Commonwealth Games in Delhi.

== Personal ==
Amberger was born on 28 January 1987 in Brisbane, Queensland, Australia. Amberger was educated at St Kevin's Primary School and St Rita's College. She is studying forensic science and biochemistry at the Queensland University of Technology. As a child, she had a passion for water, dance and gymnastics and was a State level swimmer.

== Synchronised Swimming ==
Amberger is a synchronised swimmer, who started competing in the sport at age 11 in 1998, after watching it on television. Amberger is a dual Olympian, and swims for the Gold Coast Mermaids club.

Amberger's first National Junior Team qualification was in 2002, for the Junior World Championships in Montreal. In 2003, Amberger started training with duet partner Sarah Bombell, in hope of competing in the 2006 Commonwealth Games. The duet did not realise this dream until 2010.

Amberger joined Australia's elite National Team in 2004, competing in the duet event in the Swiss Open and in the solo event at the Junior World Championships in Moscow that same year.

In 2007, Amberger represented Australia at the 2007 World Aquatics Championships held in Melbourne, competing in the free combination event. The Australian free combination routine marked the first time an Australian team had qualified for the final in a synchronised swimming event.

Amberger's first Olympic qualification was in 2008, when she was selected as a member of Australia's Olympic synchronised swimming team. Competing alongside team-mates Coral Bentley, Sarah Bombell, Tamika Domrow, Myriam Glez, Erika Leal-Ramirez, Tarren Otte, Samantha Reid and Bethany Walsh, the Australian team finished in seventh place overall, which marked Australia's highest Olympic synchronised swimming result.

In 2010, Amberger was one of three synchronised swimmers selected to compete for Australia at the 2010 Commonwealth Games in Delhi. Amberger competed in the duet event with Sarah Bombell. The pair finished third overall, claiming a bronze medal.

Amberger performed in the duet and team events at the 2012 Summer Olympics along with duet partner Sarah Bombell, and teammates Jenny-Lyn Anderson, Olga Burtaev, Tamika Domrow, Bianca Hammett, Tarren Otte, Frankie Owen and Samantha Reid. In the Duet, Australia finished 24th and in the Team event finished 8th.

Other career highlights for Amberger include 8th in the Duet and 4th in the Team events at the 2010 Swiss Open, 6th in the Team event at the 2011 French Open, 9th in the Team event at the 2011 German Open, a bronze medal with duet partner Sarah Bombell at the 2010 Commonwealth Games in Delhi and 26th in the Duet, 17th in the Team and 18th in the Technical Team events at the FINA World Championships in Shanghai.
