= Swimming at the 2008 Summer Olympics – Women's 100 metre breaststroke =

Women's 100 metre breaststroke at the Games of the XXIX Olympiad
- Venue: Beijing National Aquatics Center
- Date: August 10, 2008 (heats); August 11, 2008 (semifinals); August 12, 2008 (final)
- Competitors: 49 from 39 nations
- Winning time: 1:05.17 OR

Medalists
1st place, gold medalist(s)		Leisel Jones	Australia
2nd place, silver medalist(s)		Rebecca Soni	United States
3rd place, bronze medalist(s)		Mirna Jukić	Austria

The women's 100 metre breaststroke event at the 2008 Olympic Games took place on 10–12 August at the Beijing National Aquatics Center in Beijing, China.

After winning a silver medal in Sydney and a bronze in Athens, Australia's Leisel Jones stormed home on the final lap to claim an elusive gold in the event. She established an Olympic record of 1:05.17, just eight-hundredths of a second (0.08) off her global standard. Coming from fifth place in the turn, U.S. swimmer Rebecca Soni earned a silver medal in 1:06.73. Finishing fourth from the Olympic trials, she inherited a place in the event after Jessica Hardy's sudden withdrawal from the Games because of a doping irregularity. Meanwhile, Mirna Jukić posted a time of 1:07.34 to settle for the bronze, holding off Russia's Yuliya Yefimova (1:07.43) to fourth place by almost a tenth of a second (0.10).

Megan Jendrick, former Olympic champion from Sydney in 2000, finished fifth with a time of 1:07.62, edging out Aussie Tarnee White (1:07.63) in a close race by a hundredth of a second (0.01). China's Sun Ye (1:08.08) and Japan's Asami Kitagawa (1:08.43) rounded out the finale.

Earlier in the prelims, Jones opened up her meet by breaking a new Olympic record of 1:05.64, exactly a full second faster than a winning time set by Luo Xuejuan in Athens four years earlier.

== Records ==
Prior to this competition, the existing world and Olympic records were as follows.

World record	Leisel Jones (AUS)	1:05.09	Melbourne, Australia	20 March 2006	
Olympic record	Luo Xuejuan (CHN)	1:06.64	Athens, Greece	16 August 2004	-

The following new world and Olympic records were set during this competition.

Date	Event	Name	Nationality	Time	Record
August 10	Heat 7	Leisel Jones	Australia	1:05.64	OR
August 12	Final	Leisel Jones	Australia	1:05.17	OR

== Results ==
=== Heats ===
Rank	Heat	Lane	Name	Nationality	Time	Notes
1	7	4	Leisel Jones	Australia	1:05.64	Q, OR
2	7	3	Yuliya Efimova	Russia	1:06.08	Q, EU
3	5	6	Mirna Jukić	Austria	1:07.06	Q
4	5	4	Rebecca Soni	United States	1:07.44	Q
5	7	1	Suzaan van Biljon	South Africa	1:07.55	Q
6	6	1	Sun Ye	China	1:07.81	Q
7	6	4	Tarnee White	Australia	1:07.83	Q
8	7	6	Joline Höstman	Sweden	1:07.91	Q
9	7	5	Megan Jendrick	United States	1:08.07	Q
10	5	7	Jillian Tyler	Canada	1:08.13	Q
11	6	3	Kate Haywood	Great Britain	1:08.18	Q
12	5	2	Chen Huijia	China	1:08.24	Q
13	5	3	Annamay Pierse	Canada	1:08.25	Q
14	6	2	Kirsty Balfour	Great Britain	1:08.30	Q
15	5	1	Asami Kitagawa	Japan	1:08.36	Q
16	7	8	Elise Matthysen	Belgium	1:08.37	Q, NR
17	6	6	Megumi Taneda	Japan	1:08.45	
18	7	2	Elena Bogomazova	Russia	1:08.63	
19	3	2	Sara El Bekri	Morocco	1:08.66	
20	6	5	Sarah Poewe	Germany	1:08.69	
21	6	7	Hanna Westrin	Sweden	1:08.80	
22	4	4	Roberta Panara	Italy	1:08.90	
23	4	5	Jung Seul-ki	South Korea	1:09.26	
24	6	8	Yuliya Pidlisna	Ukraine	1:09.72	
25	5	5	Anna Khlistunova	Ukraine	1:09.95	
26	4	2	Diana Gomes	Portugal	1:10.02	
27	4	3	Inna Kapishina	Belarus	1:10.15	
28	4	1	Dilara Buse Günaydin	Turkey	1:10.45	
29	5	8	Sophie de Ronchi	France	1:10.46	
30	4	6	Angeliki Exarchou	Greece	1:10.47	
31	3	6	Adriana Marmolejo	Mexico	1:10.73	NR
32	4	7	Nicolette Teo	Singapore	1:10.76	
33	3	3	Smiljana Marinović	Croatia	1:10.94	
34	2	4	Yekaterina Sadovnik	Kazakhstan	1:11.14	
35	4	8	Jolijn van Valkengoed	Netherlands	1:11.26	
36	7	7	Sonja Schöber	Germany	1:11.36	
37	3	4	Liliana Guiscardo	Argentina	1:11.43	
38	2	5	Valeria Silva	Peru	1:11.64	NR
39	3	8	Tatiane Sakemi	Brazil	1:11.75	
40	3	5	Erla Dogg Haraldsdóttir	Iceland	1:11.78	
41	3	1	Réka Pecz	Hungary	1:12.17	
42	2	6	Danielle Beaubrun	Saint Lucia	1:12.85	
43	3	7	Nađa Higl	Serbia	1:13.19	
44	2	3	Mayumi Raheem	Sri Lanka	1:15.33	
45	2	2	Nibal Yamout	Lebanon	1:16.17	NR
46	2	7	Oksana Hatamkhanova	Azerbaijan	1:20.22	
47	1	5	Asmahan Farhat	Libya	1:21.68	
48	1	4	Anna Salnikova	Georgia	1:21.70	
49	1	3	Mariam Pauline Keita	Mali	1:24.26	

=== Semifinals ===
==== Semifinal 1 ====
Rank	Lane	Name	Nationality	Time	Notes
1	5	Rebecca Soni	United States	1:07.07	Q
2	4	Yuliya Yefimova	Russia	1:07.50	Q
3	3	Sun Ye	China	1:07.72	Q
4	6	Joline Höstman	Sweden	1:08.26	
5	7	Chen Huijia	China	1:08.60	
6	2	Jillian Tyler	Canada	1:09.00	
6	8	Elise Matthysen	Belgium	1:09.00	
8	1	Kirsty Balfour	Great Britain	1:09.23	

==== Semifinal 2 ====
Rank	Lane	Name	Nationality	Time	Notes
1	4	Leisel Jones	Australia	1:05.80	Q
2	5	Mirna Jukić	Austria	1:07.27	Q
3	6	Tarnee White	Australia	1:07.48	Q
4	2	Megan Jendrick	United States	1:08.07	Q
5	8	Asami Kitagawa	Japan	1:08.23	Q
6	1	Annamay Pierse	Canada	1:08.27	
7	7	Kate Haywood	Great Britain	1:08.36	
8	3	Suzaan van Biljon	South Africa	1:09.56	

=== Final ===
Rank	Lane	Name	Nationality	Time	Notes
1st place, gold medalist(s)	4	Leisel Jones	Australia	1:05.17	OR
2nd place, silver medalist(s)	5	Rebecca Soni	United States	1:06.73	
3rd place, bronze medalist(s)	3	Mirna Jukić	Austria	1:07.34	
4	2	Yuliya Yefimova	Russia	1:07.43	
5	1	Megan Jendrick	United States	1:07.62	
6	6	Tarnee White	Australia	1:07.63	
7	7	Sun Ye	China	1:08.08	
8	8	Asami Kitagawa	Japan	1:08.43	
