= Jenny-Lyn Anderson =

Australian synchronised swimmer

Personal information
- Nationality: Australia
- Born: 13 August 1992 (age 34) Johannesburg, South Africa
- Height: 162 cm (5 ft 4 in) (2012)
- Weight: 46 kg (101 lb) (2012)

Sport
- Country: Australia
- Sport: Synchronized swimming
- Club: Gold Coast Mermaids
- Coached by: Marina Kholod

Jenny-Lyn Anderson (born 13 August 1992) is an Australian synchronized swimmer. She competed in the women's team event at the 2012 Olympic Games.

== Personal ==
Anderson was born on 13 August 1992, in Johannesburg, South Africa. She attended Danebank Anglican School For Girls before going to high school at Emmanuel College in Queensland. As of 2012, she lives on Gold Coast, Queensland.

== Synchronised Swimming ==
Anderson is a synchronized swimmer. She began the sport in 2006 and swims for the Gold Coast Mermaids Synchronised Swimming Club. Since 2009, Anderson has been coached by Marina Kholod.

Anderson finished fourth in the team event at the 2010 Swiss Open in Arbon, Switzerland. She finished eleventh in the team event at the 2010 FINA World Cup in China. Anderson and Tamika Domrow competed in the Open Free Duet at the 2011 National Championships, coming away with a fourth-place finish. She finished eighteenth in the technical team event at the 2011 FINA World Championships in Shanghai, China. She finished seventeenth in the team event at the 2011 FINA World Championships in Shanghai, China. She finished ninth in the team event at the 2011 German Open in Bonn, Germany and sixth in the team event at the 2011 French Open in Paris, France. The FINA World Championships held in Shanghai, China served as the 2012 Olympic qualifying event for the team. In the technical team portion, her team finished 18th and in the Free Team event, her team finished 17th.

She was selected to represent Australia at the 2012 Summer Olympics in synchronized swimming alongside Eloise Amberger, Sarah Bombell, Olga Burtaev, Tamika Domrow, Bianca Hammett, Tarren Otte, Frankie Owen and Samantha Reid. The Games will be her first. She is scheduled to perform one of the team's solo performances.
