= Open water swimming at the 2009 World Aquatics Championships – Women's 5 km =

Women's 5 km at the 2009 World Aquatics Championships
- Location: Rome
- Dates: 21 July
- Competitors: 42 from 26 nations

The Women's 5K race at the 2009 World Championships occurred on Tuesday, 21 July at Ostia Beach in Rome, Italy. In total, 42 women from 26 countries competed in the race.

Note: The Women's and Men's 5K race at the 2009 Worlds were originally scheduled for Sunday, July 19; however, high wind and surf conditions on-course caused the FINA Bureau to postpone the race until July 21.

== Results ==
Rank	Swimmer	Nationality	Time
1st place, gold medalist(s)	Melissa Gorman	Australia	56:55.8
2nd place, silver medalist(s)	Larisa Ilchenko	Russia	56:56.3
3rd place, bronze medalist(s)	Poliana Okimoto	Brazil	56:59.3
4	Yurema Requena Juarez	Spain	57:00.8
5	Ekaterina Seliverstova	Russia	57:04.7
6	Kristel Köbrich	Chile	57:17.1
7	Andreina Pinto	Venezuela	57:29.4
8	Kate Brookes-Peterson	Australia	57:42.7
9	Emily Brunemann	USA	57:43.0
10	Rachele Bruni	Italy	57:43.2
11	Jana Pechanová	Czech Republic	57:44.3
12	Olga Beresneva	Ukraine	57:45.5
13	Nadine Pastor	Germany	57:47.8
14	Li Xue	China	57:52.8
15	Emily Hanson	USA	57:53.5
16	Swann Gabrielle Oberson	Switzerland	57:55.1
17	Giorgia Consiglio	Italy	57:55.8
18	Teja Zupan	Slovenia	57:58.1
19	Britta Kamrau-Corestein	Germany	58:09.0
20	Marianna Lymperta	Greece	58:09.1
21	Natalie du Toit	South Africa	58:56.3
22	Coralie Codeville	France	59:00.8
23	Zaira Cardenas	Mexico	59:23.7
24	Nika Kozamernik	Slovenia	59:25.0
25	Charlotte Woolliscroft	Great Britain	59:25.2
26	Patricia Moldonado	Venezuela	59:26.2
27	Alona Berbasova	Ukraine	59:27.6
28	Nataly Caldas Calle	Ecuador	59:27.8
29	Alannah Jury	New Zealand	59:37.5
30	Silvie Rybarova	Slovakia	59:37.8
31	Katia Barros	Ecuador	59:42.8
32	Bridget Coley	Canada	59:44.5
33	Wing Yung Natasha Terri Tang	Hong Kong	59:46.8
34	Vanessa Balogh	Hungary	59:48.5
35	Shi Yu	China	59:50.0
36	Isabelle Longo	Brazil	59:51.3
37	Dominique Dryding	South Africa	59:53.2
38	Nadine Williams	Canada	1:02:22.8
39	Cindy Toscano	Guatemala	1:08:41.9
40	Lucia Vachanova	Slovakia	1:10:17.2
--	Karin Clashing	Netherlands Antilles	OTL
--	Patricia Castañeda	Mexico	DQ

Key: OTL = Outside time limit, DQ = Disqualified

== See also ==
- Open water swimming at the 2007 World Aquatics Championships – Women's 5 km
