= Bianca Hammett =

Australian synchronized swimmer

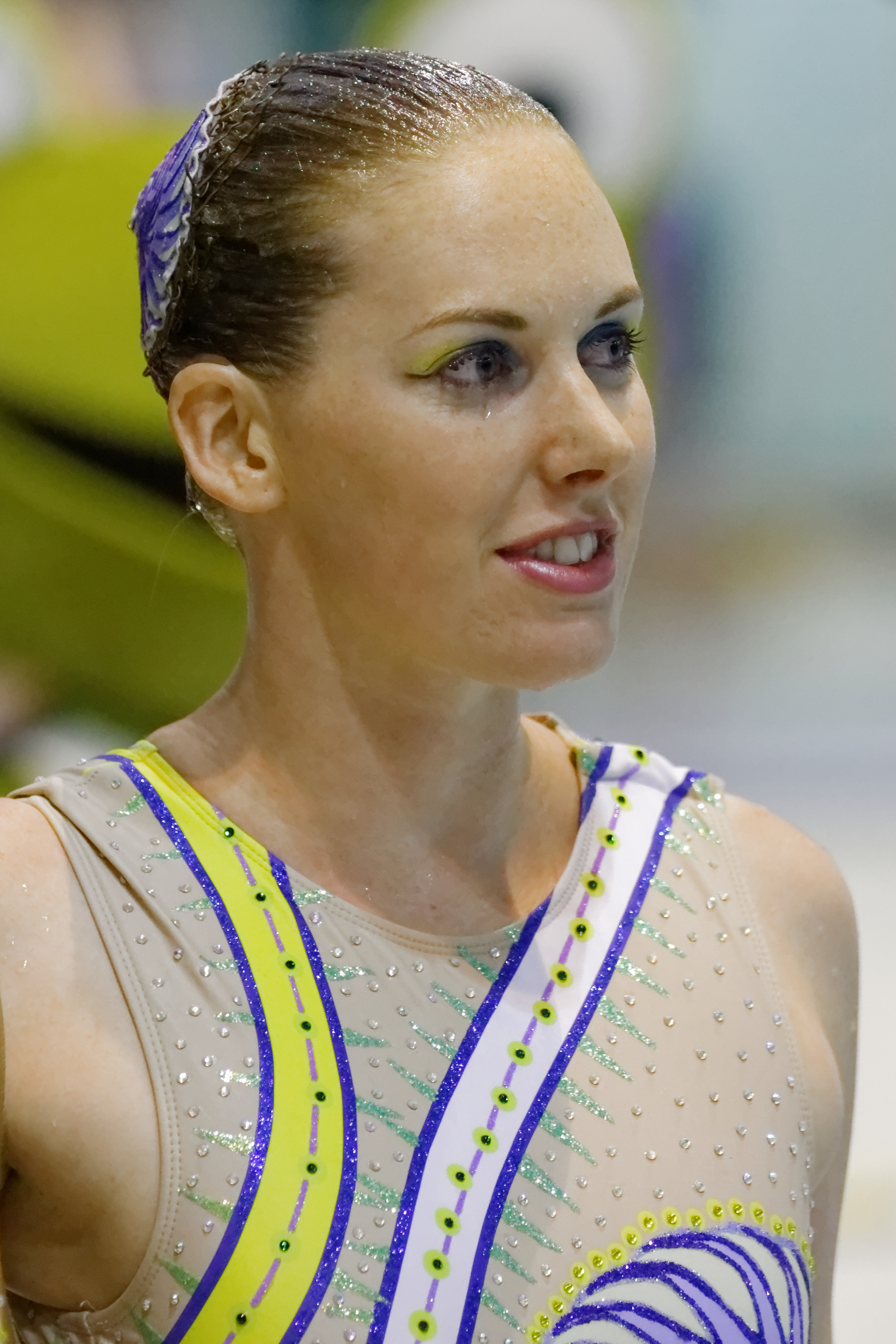
- Bianca Hammett in March 2013

Personal information
- Nicknames: B, Yanks
- Nationality: Australian
- Born: 12 September 1990 (age 36) Warrnambool, Victoria
- Height: 173 cm (5 ft 8 in) (2012)
- Weight: 55 kg (121 lb) (2012)

Sport
- Country: Australia
- Sport: Synchronised swimming
- Club: Gold Coast Mermaids
- Coached by: Lilian Grenier; Marina Kholod

Bianca Hammett (born 12 September 1990) is an Australian synchronized swimmer. Taking up the sport at the age of eight and joining Australia's National Team in 2006, Hammett has represented Australia internationally in synchronised swimming since 2007. Hammett is a dual Olympian, having competed for Australia at the 2012 Summer Olympics, held in London, and the 2016 Summer Olympics, held in Rio de Janeiro. Hammett has also competed for Australia at the 2007, 2011, 2013 and 2015 World Aquatics Championships.

== Personal ==
Nicknamed B and Yanks, Hammett was born on 12 September 1990 in Warrnambool. She attended Calamvale State School before going to Calamvale Community College for high school. In 2009, she enrolled at the University of Queensland and as of 2012, was working on a Bachelor of Applied Science. As of 2012, she lives in Calamvale, Queensland.

Hammett is 173 centimetres (5 ft 8 in) tall and weighs 55 kilograms (121 lb).

== Synchronised swimming ==
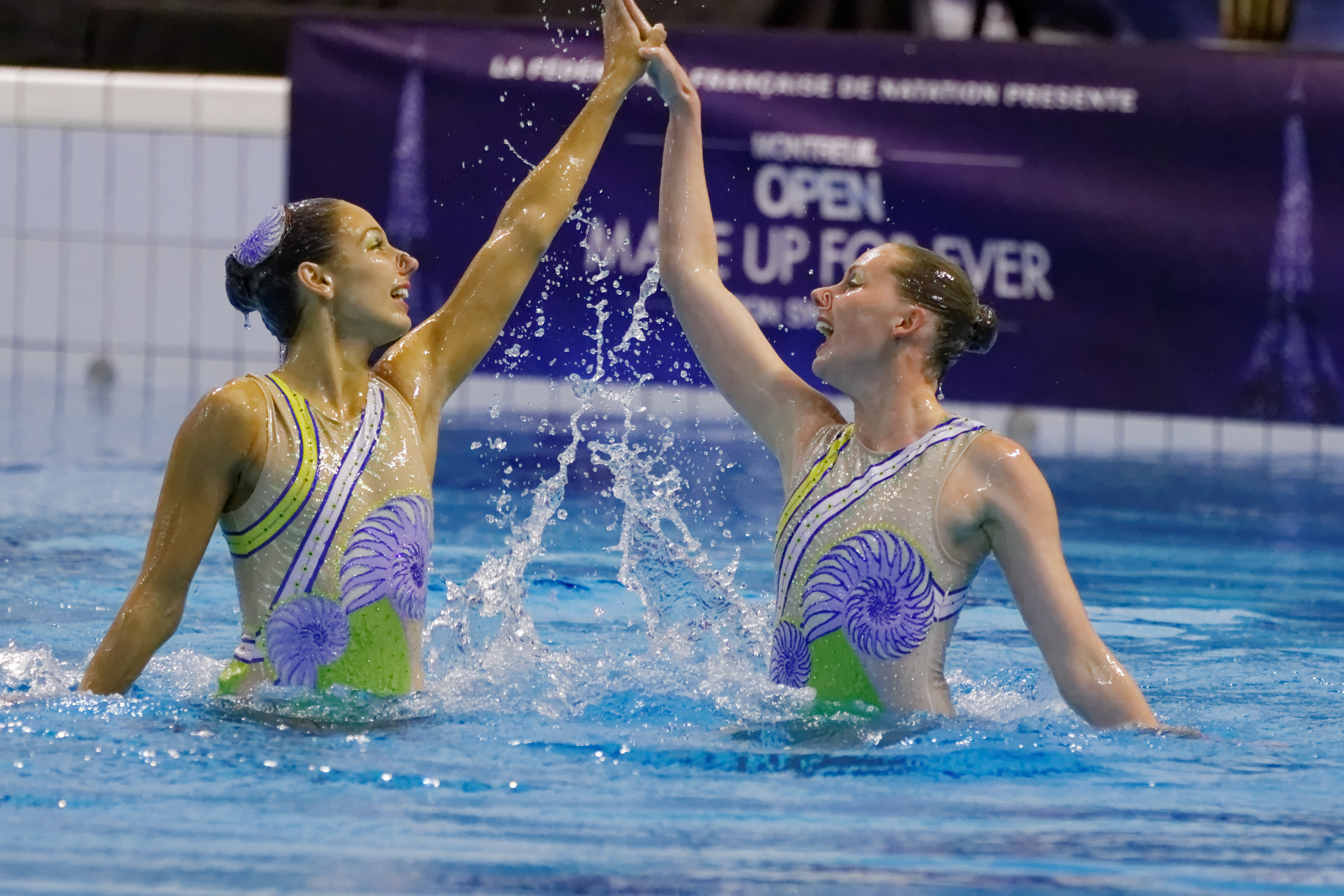
Olga Burtaev and Hammett at the 2013 French Open

Hammett is a synchronised swimmer, taking up the sport after she read an advertisement for it in a newspaper when she was eight years old. She is a member of the Gold Coast Mermaids. Hammett is currently coached by Lilian Grenier and Marina Kholod.

Hammett joined Australia's elite national synchronised swimming team in 2006, and made her international debut at the 2007 World Aquatics Championships in the free combination event. The team was the first ever Australian team to reach the finals of a synchronised swimming event.

At the 2009 National Championships, Hammett finished third in the Open Solo event and, with partner Samantha Reid, second in the Open Duet event. At the 2010 National Championships, she and Reid, finished second in the Open Duet event. At the 2011 National Championships, she and Reid finished third in the Open Technical Duet and Open Free Duet events. In the Team Open Combination event, she came away with gold.

Hammett finished 4th in the team event and 12th in Duet at the 2010 Swiss Open in Arbon, Switzerland. She finished 11th in the team event at the 2010 FINA World Cup in China. She finished 18th in the technical team event at the 2011 FINA World Championships in Shanghai, China. She finished 17th in the team event at the 2011 FINA World Championships in Shanghai, China. She finished 9th in the team event at the 2011 German Open in Bonn, Germany. She finished 6th in the team event at the 2011 French Open in Paris, France. The FINA World Championships held in Shanghai, China, served as the 2012 Olympic qualifying event for the team. Her team finished 18th in the technical team portion and 17th in the Free Team event.

Hammett was selected to represent Australia at the 2012 Summer Olympics in synchronised swimming. Hammett competed in the team event with Eloise Amberger, Jenny-Lyn Anderson, Sarah Bombell, Olga Burtaev, Tamika Domrow, Tarren Otte, Francesca Owen and Samantha Reid, finishing in eighth place overall. The 2012 Games were her first.

In 2013, Hammett was selected to compete at the 2013 World Aquatics Championships held in Barcelona. Competing alongside Olga Burtaev in the duet event, the pair finished 22nd in the technical event and 30th in the free event.

In 2015, Hammett competed with the Australian synchronised swimming team at the 2015 World Aquatics Championships held in Kazan. Hammett competed in both the team events and the duet events alongside Nikita Pablo. The Australian pair finished 28th in the technical duet, and 30th in the free duet. The Australian team finished 20th in the technical team, and 16th in the free team. Hammett was the flag bearer for the Australian aquatics team at the event.

In 2016, Hammett was selected to represent Australia at the 2016 Summer Olympics held in Rio de Janeiro, alongside Hannah Cross, Danielle Kettlewell, Nikita Pablo, Emily Rogers, Cristina Sheehan, Amber-Rose Stackpole, Amie Thompson and Deborah Tsai. The Australian team placed 8th overall in a field of 8 teams.
