= Swimming at the 2006 Commonwealth Games – Women's 100 metre breaststroke =

Women's 100 metre Breaststroke at the 2006 Commonwealth Games
- Venue: Melbourne Sports and Aquatic Centre
- Dates: 19 March (heats, semifinals); 20 March (final)
- Competitors: 22 from 15 nations
- Winning time: 1:05.09 WR

Medalists
gold medal	Leisel Jones	Australia
silver medal	Jade Edmistone	Australia
bronze medal	Kirsty Balfour	Scotland

== Women's 100 m Breaststroke - Final ==
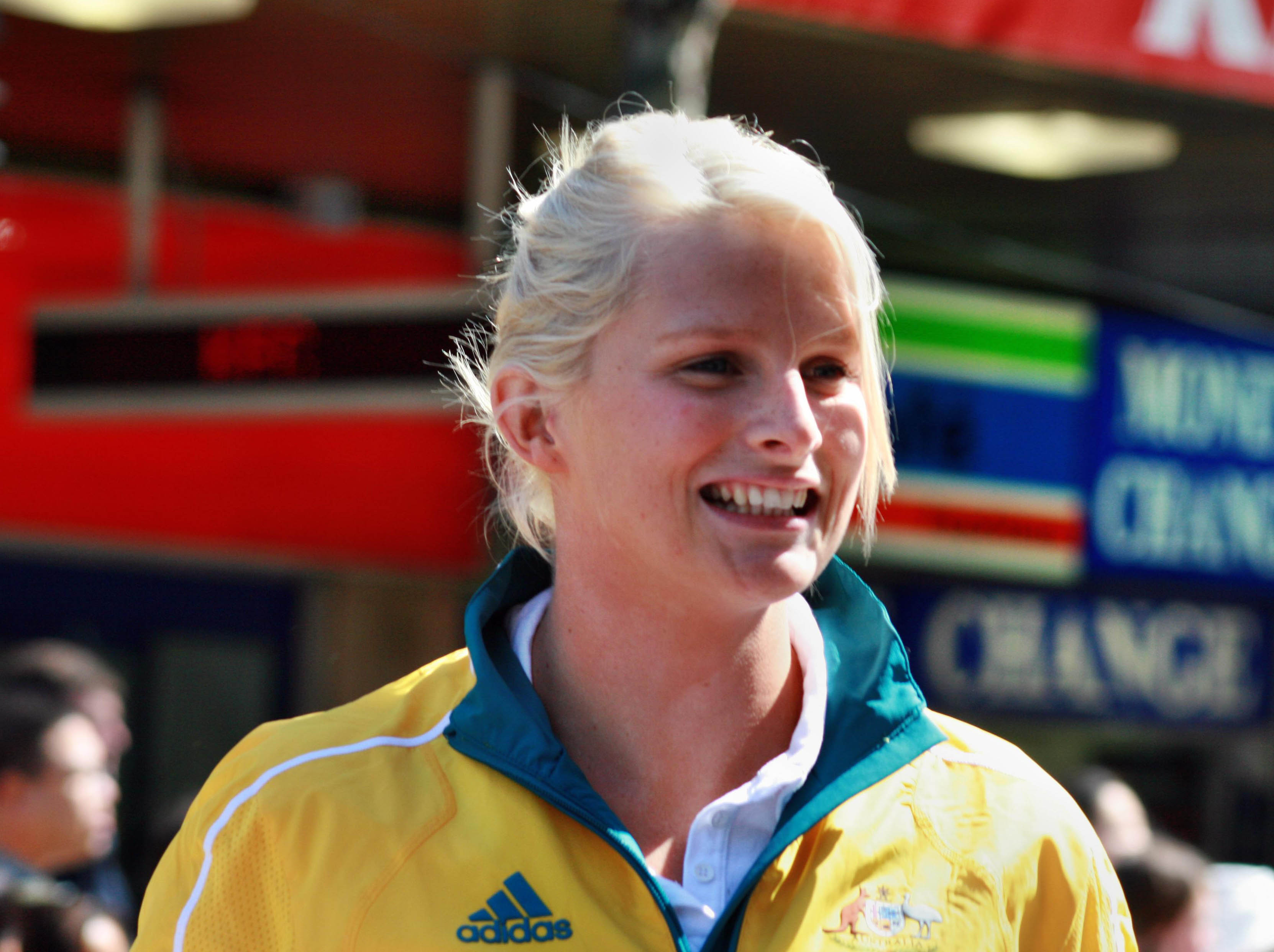
Leisel Jones

Pos.	Lane	Athlete	R.T.	50 m	100 m	Tbh.
	4	Leisel Jones (AUS)	0.77	30.83; 30.83	1:05.09 (WR); 34.26	
	5	Jade Edmistone (AUS)	0.81	31.36; 31.36	1:07.24; 35.88	2.15
	6	Kirsty Balfour (SCO)	0.83	32.08; 32.08	1:07.83; 35.75	2.74
4	3	Tarnee White (AUS)	0.75	31.87; 31.87	1:07.95; 36.08	2.86
5	2	Suzaan van Biljon (RSA)	0.76	31.99; 31.99	1:08.42; 36.43	3.33
6	7	Kate Haywood (ENG)	0.88	32.16; 32.16	1:09.28; 37.12	4.19
7	8	Lauren van Oosten (CAN)	0.75	32.84; 32.84	1:09.43; 36.59	4.34
8	1	Kerry Buchan (SCO)	0.80	32.62; 32.62	1:09.49; 36.87	4.40

== Women's 100 m Breaststroke - Semifinals ==
=== Women's 100 m Breaststroke - Semifinal 01 ===
Pos.	Lane	Athlete	R.T.	50 m	100 m	Tbh.
1	4	Jade Edmistone (AUS)	0.80	31.54; 31.54	1:07.93 (GR); 36.39	
2	3	Suzaan van Biljon (RSA)	0.72	32.09; 32.09	1:08.50; 36.41	0.57
3	5	Kate Haywood (ENG)	0.86	32.20; 32.20	1:09.28; 37.08	1.35
4	6	Kerry Buchan (SCO)	0.83	32.91; 32.91	1:09.38; 36.47	1.45
5	2	Tamaryn Laubscher (RSA)	0.75	33.85; 33.85	1:11.76; 37.91	3.83
6	1	Alia Atkinson (JAM)	0.73	34.11; 34.11	1:13.56; 39.45	5.63
7	7	Fiona Booth (SCO)	0.85	33.61; 33.61	1:13.87; 40.26	5.94
8	8	Danielle Beaubrun (LCA)	0.73	35.54; 35.54	1:17.68; 42.14	9.75

=== Women's 100 m Breaststroke - Semifinal 02 ===
Pos.	Lane	Athlete	R.T.	50 m	100 m	Tbh.
1	4	Leisel Jones (AUS)	0.80	31.41; 31.41	1:07.33 (GR); 35.92	
2	5	Tarnee White (AUS)	0.76	31.99; 31.99	1:08.34; 36.35	1.01
3	6	Kirsty Balfour (SCO)	0.84	32.51; 32.51	1:08.45; 35.94	1.12
4	3	Lauren van Oosten (CAN)	0.76	32.82; 32.82	1:09.73; 36.91	2.40
5	2	Lowri Tynan (WAL)	0.85	33.31; 33.31	1:11.94; 38.63	4.61
6	1	Annabelle Carey (NZL)	0.74	33.61; 33.61	1:11.99; 38.38	4.66
7	7	Jean-Marie Neethling (RSA)	0.74	34.17; 34.17	1:12.38; 38.21	5.05
8	8	Rachel Ah Koy (FIJ)	0.65	35.68; 35.68	1:17.16; 41.48	9.83

== Women's 100 m Breaststroke - Heats ==
=== Women's 100 m Breaststroke - Heat 01 ===
Pos.	Lane	Athlete	R.T.	50 m	100 m	Tbh.
1	4	Tarnee White (AUS)	0.77	32.32; 32.32	1:09.11; 36.79	
2	5	Kirsty Balfour (SCO)	0.79	33.04; 33.04	1:10.20; 37.16	1.09
3	3	Lowri Tynan (WAL)	0.81	33.60; 33.60	1:11.55; 37.95	2.44
4	6	Jean-Marie Neethling (RSA)	0.73	34.25; 34.25	1:12.85; 38.60	3.74
5	2	Rachel Ah Koy (FIJ)	0.61	35.45; 35.45	1:16.33; 40.88	7.22
6	7	Mayumi Raheem (SRI)	0.82	36.41; 36.41	1:18.59; 42.18	9.48
7	1	Nasra Nandha (KEN)	0.85	41.82; 41.82	1:31.00; 49.18	21.89

=== Women's 100 m Breaststroke - Heat 02 ===
Pos.	Lane	Athlete	R.T.	50 m	100 m	Tbh.
1	4	Jade Edmistone (AUS)	0.81	32.36; 32.36	1:09.00; 36.64	
2	5	Kate Haywood (ENG)	0.88	32.69; 32.69	1:09.62; 36.93	0.62
3	6	Tamaryn Laubscher (RSA)	0.78	34.36; 34.36	1:12.69; 38.33	3.69
4	3	Annabelle Carey (NZL)	0.73	34.56; 34.56	1:14.48; 39.92	5.48
5	2	Alia Atkinson (JAM)	0.73	35.17; 35.17	1:15.16; 39.99	6.16
6	7	Danielle Beaubrun (LCA)	0.73	35.89; 35.89	1:17.96; 42.07	8.96
7	1	Nicole Ellsworth (PNG)	0.82	39.82; 39.82	1:25.46; 45.64	16.46

=== Women's 100 m Breaststroke - Heat 03 ===
Pos.	Lane	Athlete	R.T.	50 m	100 m	Tbh.
1	4	Leisel Jones (AUS)	0.78	32.26; 32.26	1:08.52; 36.26	
2	6	Lauren van Oosten (CAN)	0.74	33.15; 33.15	1:10.06; 36.91	1.54
3	5	Suzaan van Biljon (RSA)	0.75	32.80; 32.80	1:10.09; 37.29	1.57
4	3	Kerry Buchan (SCO)	0.80	33.18; 33.18	1:10.21; 37.03	1.69
5	2	Fiona Booth (SCO)	0.85	34.10; 34.10	1:13.68; 39.58	5.16
6	7	Dannie'Lle Van Zijl (NAM)	0.86	36.43; 36.43	1:18.20; 41.77	9.68
7	1	Stacey Ryder (SWZ)	0.75	37.25; 37.25	1:19.63; 42.38	11.11
8	8	Mariyam Ali (MDV)	0.90	46.72; 46.72	1:40.31; 53.59	31.79
