= Scott Robertson =

Scott Robertson may refer to:

- Scotty Robertson (1930–2011), American basketball coach
- Scott Robertson (rugby union) (born 1974), New Zealand rugby coach
- Scott Robertson (footballer, born 1985), Scottish football player (Dundee United, Hibernian, Botoșani)
- Scott Robertson (footballer, born 1987), Scottish football player (Queen of the South, Partick Thistle, Stranraer)
- Scott Robertson (footballer, born 2001), Scottish football player (Celtic and Crewe Alexandra)
- Scott Robertson (diver) (born 1987), Australian diver
