= Réka Pecz =

Hungarian swimmer (born 1992)

Personal information
- Full name: Réka Pecz
- National team: Hungary
- Born: 21 June 1992 (age 34) Budapest, Hungary
- Height: 1.72 m (5 ft 8 in)
- Weight: 63 kg (139 lb)

Sport
- Sport: Swimming
- Strokes: Breaststroke
- Club: Jövő SC
- Coach: Balázs Fehérvári

Réka Pecz (born June 21, 1992) is a Hungarian swimmer, who specialized in breaststroke events. Pecz represented her nation Hungary at the 2008 Summer Olympics, and also trained as a member of the swimming team at Jövő Sports Club in Miskolc, under the tutelage of personal coach Balázs Fehérvári.

Pecz competed for Hungary in the women's 100 m breaststroke at the 2008 Summer Olympics in Beijing, Leading up to the Games, she posted a time of 1:11.15 to clear the FINA B-standard (1:11.43) by 0.28 of a second at the Hungarian Junior Championships in Eger. Swimming on the outside lane in heat three, Pecz opened up the race with a spectacular second-place feat, but faded down the stretch to hit the wall with a seventh-place time in 1:12.17. Pecz, however, failed to advance to the semifinals, as she placed forty-first out of 49 swimmers in the prelims.
