= Anna Salnikova =

Georgian swimmer

Personal information
- Full name: Anna Salnikova
- National team: Georgia
- Born: 11 January 1987 (age 39) Tbilisi, Georgian SSR, Soviet Union
- Height: 1.67 m (5 ft 6 in)
- Weight: 52 kg (115 lb)

Sport
- Sport: Swimming
- Strokes: Breaststroke
- Coach: Zurab Khomasuridze

Anna Salnikova (Georgian: ანა სალნიკოვა; born January 11, 1987) is a Georgian swimmer, who specialized in breaststroke events. She represented her nation Georgia at the 2008 Summer Olympics, and held a Georgian national record in both the 50 and 100 m breaststroke until they were later broken by Teona Bostashvili in two separate editions of the World Championships (2013 and 2015).

Salnikova received a wild card invitation from FINA to compete as a lone Georgian female swimmer in the 100 m breaststroke at the 2008 Summer Olympics in Beijing. Tying for first at the initial length of the opening heat, she fought off a sprint challenge from Libya's Asmahan Farhat by just the slimmest of the margins for the top spot, but nearly faded down the last stroke to touch the wall with a second-place time in 1:21.70. Salnikova failed to advance to the semifinals, as she placed forty-eighth overall in the preliminary heats.
