= Open water swimming at the 2007 World Aquatics Championships – Women's 5 km =

Women's 5 km at the 2007 World Aquatics Championships
- Venue: St Kilda Beach
- Location: Melbourne
- Dates: 18 March

The Women's 5 km Open Water event at the 2007 World Aquatics Championships was held on 18 March 2007 at St Kilda beach.

== Result ==
#	Name	Country	Time	Pts
1	Larisa Ilchenko	Russia	1:00:41.3	18
2	Ekaterina Seliverstva	Russia	1:00:43.6	16
3	Kate Brookes-Peterson	Australia	1:00:47.6	14
4	Britta Kamrau	Germany	1:00:47.7	12
5	Jana Pechanová	Czech Republic	1:00:48.1	10
6	Poliana Okimoto	Brazil	1:00:48.7	8
7	Alessia Paoloni	Italy	1:00:50.1	6
8	Eva Berglund	Sweden	1:00:50.3	5
9	Nika Kozamernik	Slovenia	1:00:50.8	4
10	Yurema Requena Juarez	Spain	1:00:50.8	3
11	Fang Yanqiao	China	1:00:51.0	2
12	Chloe Sutton	United States	1:00:51.9	1
13	Wang Yiluo	China	1:00:52.0	
14	Cathy Dietrich	France	1:00:52.4	
15	Xenia Lopez Rodriguez	Spain	1:00:56.0	
16	Martina Grimaldi	Italy	1:00:58.4	
17	Leah Gingrich	United States	1:00:58.5	
18	Alexandra Bagley	Australia	1:00:58.5	
19	Stefanie Biller	Germany	1:01:00.2	
20	Natalya Samorodina	Ukraine	1:01:14.6	
21	Andreina del Valle Perez	Venezuela	1:02:15.7	
22	Maria da Penha Cruz	Brazil	1:04:20.0	
23	Michelle Savchenka Santiago	Venezuela	1:07:34.5	
24	Caroline Murray	Canada	1:08:07.8	
25	Nataly Caldas Calle	Ecuador	1:08:42.2	
26	Francis Mishell Tixe Cobos	Ecuador	1:09:42.4	
27	Maria Gabriela Muñoz Duarte	Guatemala	1:10:22.9	
28	Christel Erdmenger Gutierriz	Guatemala	1:20:45.8	
	Velia Janse van Rensburg	South Africa	DNS	
