= Synchronised swimming at the 2010 Commonwealth Games – Women's duet =

The women's duet synchronized swimming event at the 2010 Commonwealth Games was held from 6 to 7 October, at the SPM Swimming Pool Complex. 7 duets competed, each consisting of two swimmers. There were two rounds of competition. The preliminary round consisted of a technical routine and a free routine.

== Results ==
Rank	Country	Athlete	Technical	Free	Total
1st place, gold medalist(s)	Canada	Marie-Pier Boudreau Gagnon & Chloé Isaac	47.500	47.667	95.167
2nd place, silver medalist(s)	England	Olivia Allison & Jenna Randall	44.250	45.084	89.334
3rd place, bronze medalist(s)	Australia	Sarah Bombell & Eloise Amberger	39.250	39.750	79.000
4	Malaysia	Shareen Png Hui Chuen & Lee Zhien Huey	37.334	38.917	76.251
5	New Zealand	Caitlin Anderson & Kirstin Anderson	35.833	36.583	73.166
6	Sri Lanka	Elisha Gomes & Dehara Katipearachchi	31.500	32.000	63.500
7	India	Vijay Bijal Vasant & Kavita Kolapkar	25.000	25.917	50.917
