= Tara Kirk =

American swimmer (born 1982)

Personal information
- Full name: Tara Kirk Sell
- National team: United States
- Born: Tara Joy Kirk; July 12, 1982 (age 44) Bremerton, Washington, U.S.
- Height: 5 ft 6 in (168 cm)
- Weight: 143 lb (65 kg)
- Spouse: Greg Sell (2009–present)

Sport
- Sport: Swimming
- College team: Stanford University
- Coach: Richard Quick (Stanford)
Medal record
Women's swimming
Representing the United States
Olympic Games
Silver medal – second place	2004 Athens	4×100 m medley
World Championships (LC)
Silver medal – second place	2003 Barcelona	4×100 m medley
Silver medal – second place	2005 Montreal	4×100 m medley
Silver medal – second place	2007 Melbourne	100 m breaststroke
Silver medal – second place	2007 Melbourne	4×100 m medley
Bronze medal – third place	2005 Montreal	100 m breaststroke
Bronze medal – third place	2007 Melbourne	50 m breaststroke
World Championships (SC)
Gold medal – first place	2006 Shanghai	100 m breaststroke
Silver medal – second place	2004 Indianapolis	4×100 m medley
Silver medal – second place	2006 Shanghai	200 m breaststroke
Silver medal – second place	2006 Shanghai	4×100 m medley
Bronze medal – third place	2000 Athens	50 m breaststroke
Bronze medal – third place	2004 Indianapolis	50 m breaststroke
Bronze medal – third place	2004 Indianapolis	100 m breaststroke
Pan Pacific Championships
Gold medal – first place	2006 Victoria	100 m breaststroke
Silver medal – second place	2002 Yokohama	100 m breaststroke
Summer Universiade
Gold medal – first place	2001 Beijing	50 m breaststroke

Tara Kirk Sell (born July 12, 1982) is an American former competition swimmer and breaststroke specialist who is an Olympic silver medalist. She is a former world record holder in the 100-meter breaststroke (short course).

She has won a total of fifteen medals in major international competition, three gold, seven silver, and five bronze spanning the Olympics, the World Championships, the Pan Pacific Championships, and the Summer Universiade.

Kirk was the contributor for Episode 18, Season 6 of What Not to Wear.

== Swimming career ==
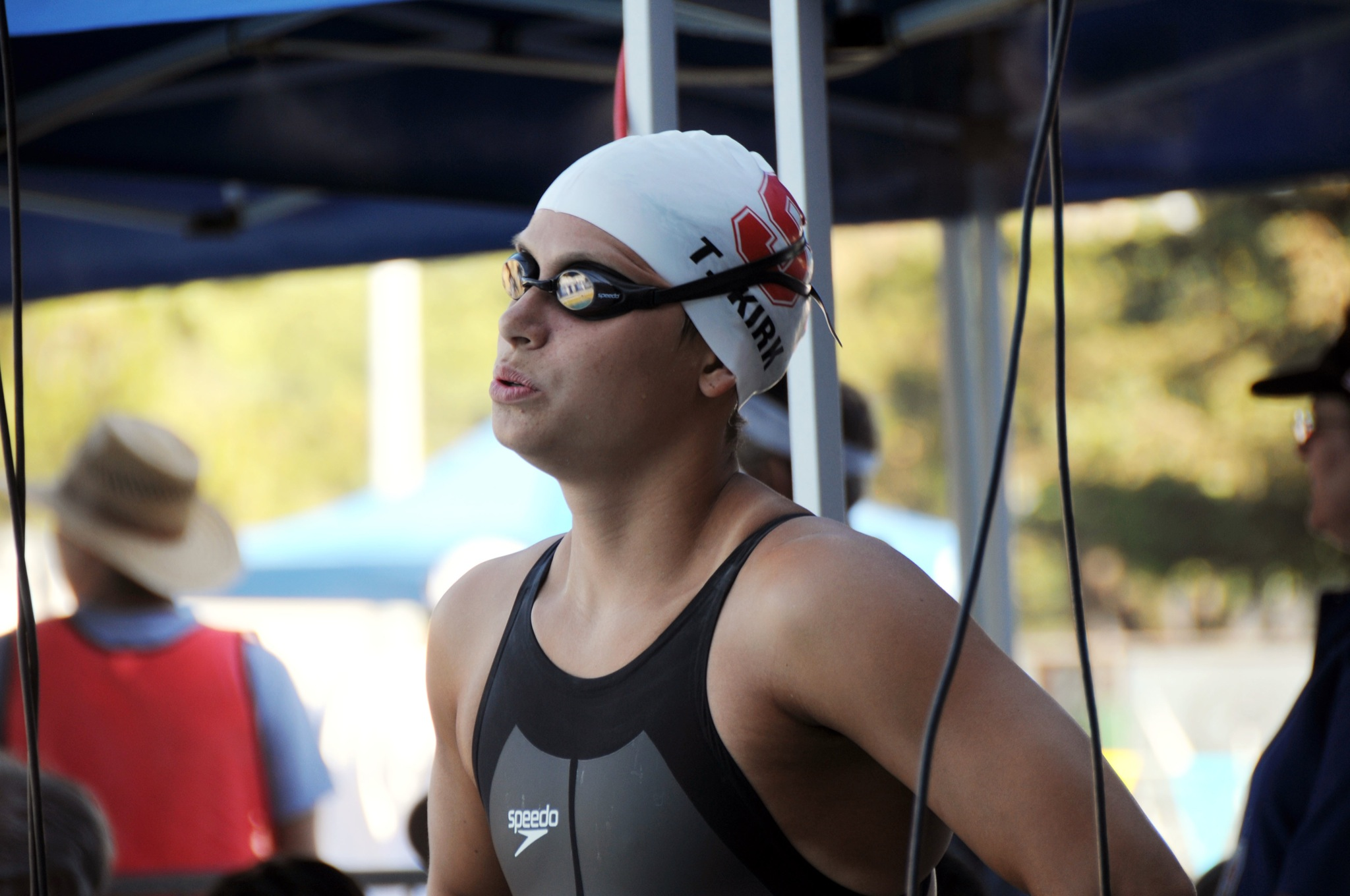
Kirk in 2008

Kirk is the former American Record holder in the 50-meter, 100-meter, and 200-meter breaststrokes. Kirk is the first woman to swim the 100-yard breaststroke in under 58 seconds (57.77). Kirk previously held the 100 short-course meter breaststroke world record at 1:04.79 but this was beaten by Leisel Jones on August 28, 2006. Kirk received the 1997–98 Honda Sports Award for Swimming and Diving, recognizing her as the outstanding college female swimmer of the year, and the Honda-Broderick Cup for 2003–04, recognizing her as the top college female athlete in all sports.

In the 2004 Summer Olympics in Athens, Tara won a silver medal by swimming for the second-place American team in the preliminary heats of the women's 4×100-meter medley relay. Tara Kirk's younger sister, Dana Kirk, who also competed for Stanford, joined her on the 2004 USA Women's Olympic Swimming team, becoming the first set of sisters to swim on the same US Olympic Team.

== 2008 Olympic team controversy ==
Kirk finished third at the 2008 U.S. Olympic Trials by one-hundredth of a second and did not qualify for the 2008 Olympic Games in the 100-meter breaststroke. Kirk had decided to not swim the 200-meter breaststroke in order to concentrate on the 100.

On July 21, 2008, the winner of the women's 100 breaststroke at the Trials, Jessica Hardy, was notified that she had tested positive for clenbuterol, a banned substance. Hardy subsequently left the USA's Olympic team on August 1, 2008, upon her initial hearing in front of the United States Anti-Doping Agency. Unfortunately for Kirk, Hardy's departure from the team was too late for Kirk to be named a replacement to Hardy on the Olympic team or for Kirk to be entered to the 2008 Olympic organizers as a member of the USA team—the entry deadline for the Games had passed.

There was an issue regarding a delay of Hardy receiving her test results, and it was later determined that the lateness of the delivery of the test results was due to a lab error which logged Hardy's samples as "regular" rather than "expedited." Kirk filed a claim against USA Swimming to earn a berth on the team (while Hardy was still on the team, and before Hardy's official departure from the team on August 1), but the arbitrator in the case determined that at that time, no rules were violated.

== Public health career ==
Kirk completed her PhD from the Johns Hopkins Bloomberg School of Public Health in the Department of Health Policy and Management, where she was a Sommer Scholar. Her dissertation work focused on public policy responses to emerging epidemics and specifically how the media and policy intertwine in the case of Ebola and the health consequences of these policy actions. She received a BA in human biology and an MA in anthropological sciences from Stanford University. In 2005 she was a Rhodes Scholar finalist.

Kirk is an associate professor in the Department of Environmental Health and Engineering and a senior associate at the Johns Hopkins Center for Health Security at the Johns Hopkins Bloomberg School of Public Health. She conducts research to develop a greater understanding of potentially large-scale health events such as disease outbreaks, bioterrorism, natural disasters, or radiological/nuclear events. She also serves as an associate editor of the peer-reviewed journal Health Security (formerly Biosecurity and Bioterrorism).

Kirk's work focuses on improving public health policy and practice in order to reduce the health impacts of disasters and terrorism. She works on qualitative and quantitative research analyses and uses this research to assist in the development of strategy and policy recommendations. Her primary research interests include biosecurity and biodefense, public health preparedness, emerging infectious disease, federal funding and budgeting, and nuclear preparedness policy and practice.

Kirk is currently principal investigator on two projects investigating policy development and risk communication in disease outbreaks. Her research on persuasive communication about risks from and responses to Zika investigates how public health communication practices can be strengthened to improve public understanding, acceptance, and response during future infectious disease outbreaks through improved insights into current communication efforts and messages, public knowledge, and public values relevant to the Zika outbreak. Another research project investigates how decisions on Ebola policies were made at the state level and what factors beyond CDC guidelines played the most significant role in shaping state and local policy.

Kirk has also led several research projects to provide strategic recommendations regarding the Threat and Hazard Identification and Risk Assessment (THIRA) Process and the Chemical and Biological Defense Division in DHS. In addition, she conducts research and analysis of the funding and management of civilian biodefense, radiological/nuclear defense, and chemical defense programs in the US government, providing an accounting of federal funding on a yearly basis.

Kirk other research efforts focus on public health and resilience at a local level, evaluating local responses to recent outbreaks, local public health needs for community engagement, and local capabilities and needs. Kirk co-authored the Rad Resilient City Preparedness Checklist, which provides cities and their neighbors with actions to save lives in the event of a nuclear detonation. She also co-authored a comprehensive analysis of preparedness activities in communities located in the Emergency Planning Zones of nuclear power plants.

== Personal life ==
Tara Kirk married Greg Sell in 2009.

== See also ==
- List of Olympic medalists in swimming (women)
- List of Stanford University people
- List of World Aquatics Championships medalists in swimming (women)
- World record progression 100 metres breaststroke

Records
Preceded by Leisel Jones	Women's 100-meter breaststroke world record-holder (short course); March 18, 2004 – August 27, 2006	Succeeded by Leisel Jones
Sporting positions
Preceded by Leisel Jones	Mare Nostrum Tour Overall Winner; 2007	Succeeded by Sophie Edington
