= Birte Steven =

German swimmer

Personal information
- Full name: Birte Steven
- Nationality: Germany
- Born: 11 October 1980 (age 45) Hannover, Lower Saxony, West Germany
- Height: 1.73 m (5 ft 8 in)
- Weight: 61 kg (134 lb)

Sport
- Sport: Swimming
- Strokes: Breaststroke
- Club: SGJ Hannover
- College team: Oregon State University (U.S.)
- Coach: Larry Liebowitz (U.S.)

Birte Steven (born 11 October 1980) is a German former swimmer, who specialized in breaststroke events. She is a ten-time All-Pacific honoree, and also a sixth-place finalist in the 200 m breaststroke at the 2007 FINA World Championships in Melbourne, Australia. Since 2007, Steven currently holds a long-course German record of 2:25.33 from the national championships.

Steven qualified for the women's 200 m breaststroke at the 2004 Summer Olympics in Athens, by attaining an A-standard entry time of 2:25.95 from the German Olympic trials. In the morning's preliminary heats, Steven recorded the seventh fastest time of 2:27.42 to secure her spot in the semifinal run. On the evening session, Steven failed to qualify for the final, as she placed eleventh overall in the semifinals, with a time of 2:29.22.

Steven is also a member of the swimming team for the Oregon State Beavers, and a former student major in psychology at the Oregon State University in Corvallis, Oregon.
