= Myriam Glez =

French-Australian synchronised swimmer

Personal information
- Born: May 20, 1980 (age 46) Lyon, France

Sport
- Sport: Synchronised swimming
- Club: Sydney Emeralds

Myriam Glez (born May 20, 1980) in Lyon, France) is a French–Australian Olympic synchronised swimmer who represented France at the 2000 Summer Olympics in Sydney and Australia at the 2008 Summer Olympics in Beijing.

== Synchronised Swimming ==
Glez was inspired to take up synchronised swimming when she was six, after watching it on television. Glez won ten synchronised swimming titles in France, and represented France in Team at the 2000 Olympics, coming fourth. Glez moved to Australia in 2005 to take up a marketing position. Although the move wasn't meant to be permanent, she took Australian citizenship in 2007 and became eligible for selection on the Australian team in Beijing.

She competed in the duet with Erika Leal-Ramirez, who had also represented another country in synchronised swimming, Mexico. The pair finished 21st from a field of 24. Glez was also a member of the Australian team which finished seventh, its best Olympic performance.

Glez was the founder of Sydney Emeralds club, which she started with Katerina Poorova. It grew from a tiny club to now a large club in Sydney. Among the Emeralds' alumni are Amie Thompson and Li-Ching Yew, who competed for Australia at the 2011 World Aquatics Championships. Amie Thompson also competed at the 2016 Rio Olympics.

Glez moved to England in 2010 and coached the British Olympic Team with Biz Price and Lolli Montico for two years leading up to the 2012 Olympics in London. During that time, she also the Junior National Team and the England Talent Teams.

In 2012, Glez moved to the US with her family first in New York City, NY and then to San Francisco, CA. Glez became USA Synchro High Performance Director in 2012.

In 2015, she became the CEO of USA Synchronized Swimming and has led a re-structure of the organization since focusing on long term stability.
