= Scott Robertson (diver) =

Australian diver

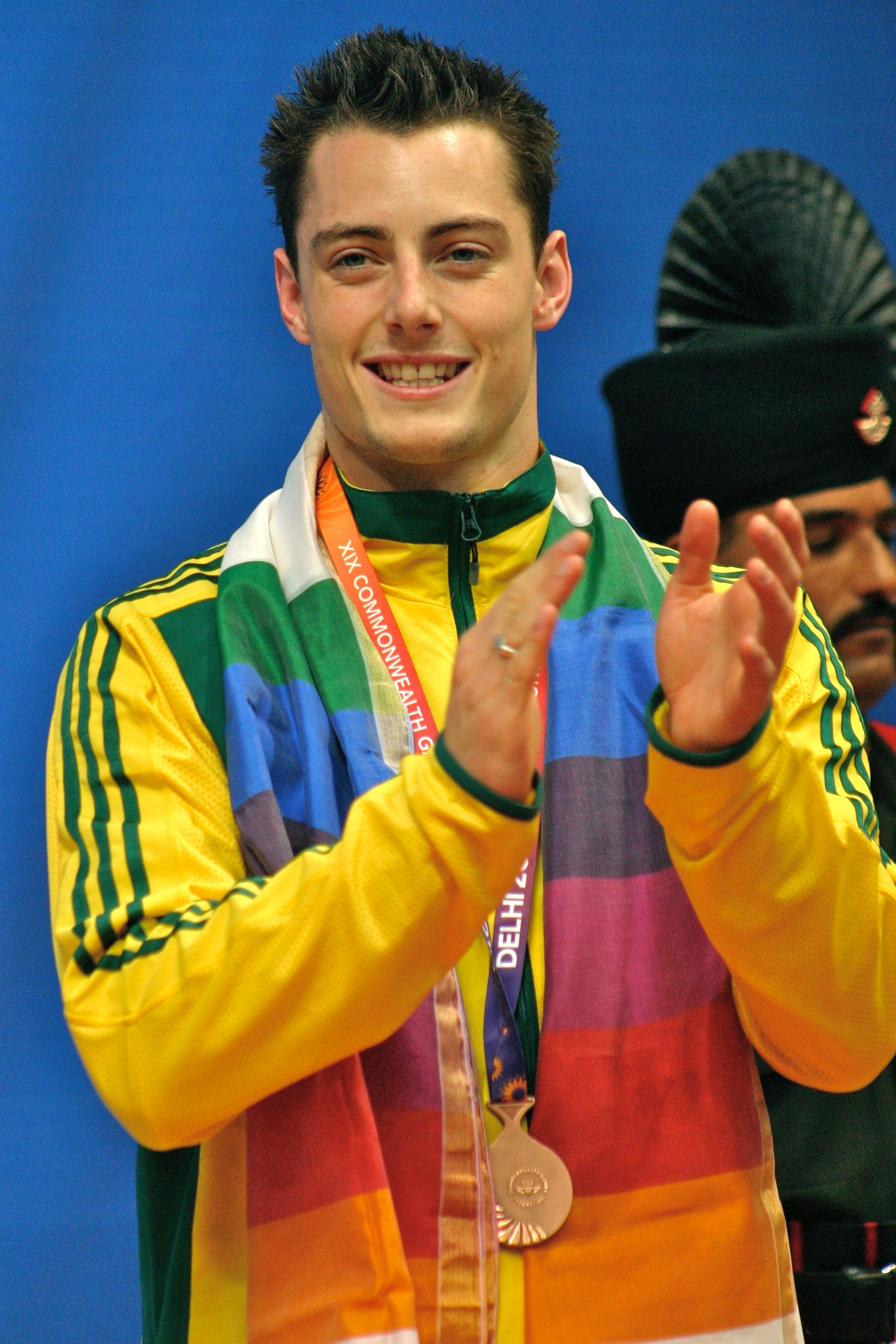
- Scott Robertson

Personal information
- Born: 24 June 1987 (age 39) Sale, Victoria
- Home town: Sale, Victoria
- Height: 175 cm (5 ft 9 in)

Sport
- Country: Australia
- Event(s): 3m, 10m, 3m Synchro, 10m Synchro
- Club: Whitehorse Diving Club/Hunter United Diving Academy
- Former partner(s): Robert Newbery; Matthew Mitcham; Rodger Lilleyman; Peter Hill Grant Nel
Medal record
Representing Australia
Men's diving
2004 World Junior Championships (Belem)
Silver medal – second place	2004 World Junior Championships (Belem)	3 m Synchro (Matthew Mitcham)
2005 Australian Youth Olympic Festival
Gold medal – first place	2005 Australian Youth Olympic Festival	3 m Synchro (Matthew Mitcham)
Bronze medal – third place	2005 Australian Youth Olympic Festival	1 m
2006 Australian Open Championships
Silver medal – second place	2006 Australian Open Championships	3 m Synchro (Matthew Mitcham)
Silver medal – second place	2006 Australian Open Championships	1 m Synchro (Matthew Mitcham)
2006 FINA Grand Prix (Ft. Lauderdale)
Bronze medal – third place	2006 FINA Grand Prix (Ft. Lauderdale)	3 m Synchro (Matthew Mitcham)
2007 Australian Open Championships
Gold medal – first place	2007 Australian Open Championships	3 m
Gold medal – first place	2007 Australian Open Championships	10 m
Gold medal – first place	2007 Australian Open Championships	10 m Synchro (Peter Hill)
Silver medal – second place	2007 Australian Open Championships	1 m
Silver medal – second place	2007 Australian Open Championships	3 m Synchro (Rodger Lilleyman)
2008 Olympic Trials
Gold medal – first place	2008 Olympic Trials	3 m Synchro (Robert Newbery)
2008 Australian Open Championships
Gold medal – first place	2008 Australian Open Championships	3 m Synchro (Robert Newbery)
Silver medal – second place	2008 Australian Open Championships	3 m
Silver medal – second place	2008 Australian Open Championships	10 m
2008 FINA World Cup (Beijing)
Bronze medal – third place	2008 FINA World Cup	3 m Synchro (Robert Newbery)
2008 FINA Grand Prix (Shenzhen)
Silver medal – second place	2008 FINA Grand Prix (Shenzhen, China)	3 m Synchro (Robert Newbery)
2008 FINA Grand Prix (Montréal)
Silver medal – second place	2008 FINA Grand Prix (Montréal)	3 m Synchro (Robert Newbery)
FINA Grand Prix (Rostock)
Bronze medal – third place	FINA Grand Prix (Rostock)	3 m Synchro (Robert Newbery)
2010 Australian Open Championships
Gold medal – first place	2010 Australian Open Championships	3 m
Gold medal – first place	2010 Australian Open Championships	3 m Synchro (Grant Nel)
Bronze medal – third place	2010 Australian Open Championships	1 m
2010 FINA Grand Prix (Montréal)
Bronze medal – third place	2010 FINA Grand Prix (Montréal)	3 m
Commonwealth Games
Bronze medal – third place	2010 Delhi Commonwealth Games (Delhi)	1 m

Scott Robertson (born 24 June 1987) is a former Australian Springboard and Platform diver.

Scott began diving at Whitehorse Diving Club in Melbourne back in 1993. His coach Doug Walton coached him through to an international level before Scott relocated to Brisbane in 2004 to take up a scholarship at the Australian Institute of Sport . In 2004 he and synchro partner Matthew Mitcham took out a Silver Medal at the World Junior Championships in Belem - Brazil before transitioning to the Senior National Team in 2005/2006.

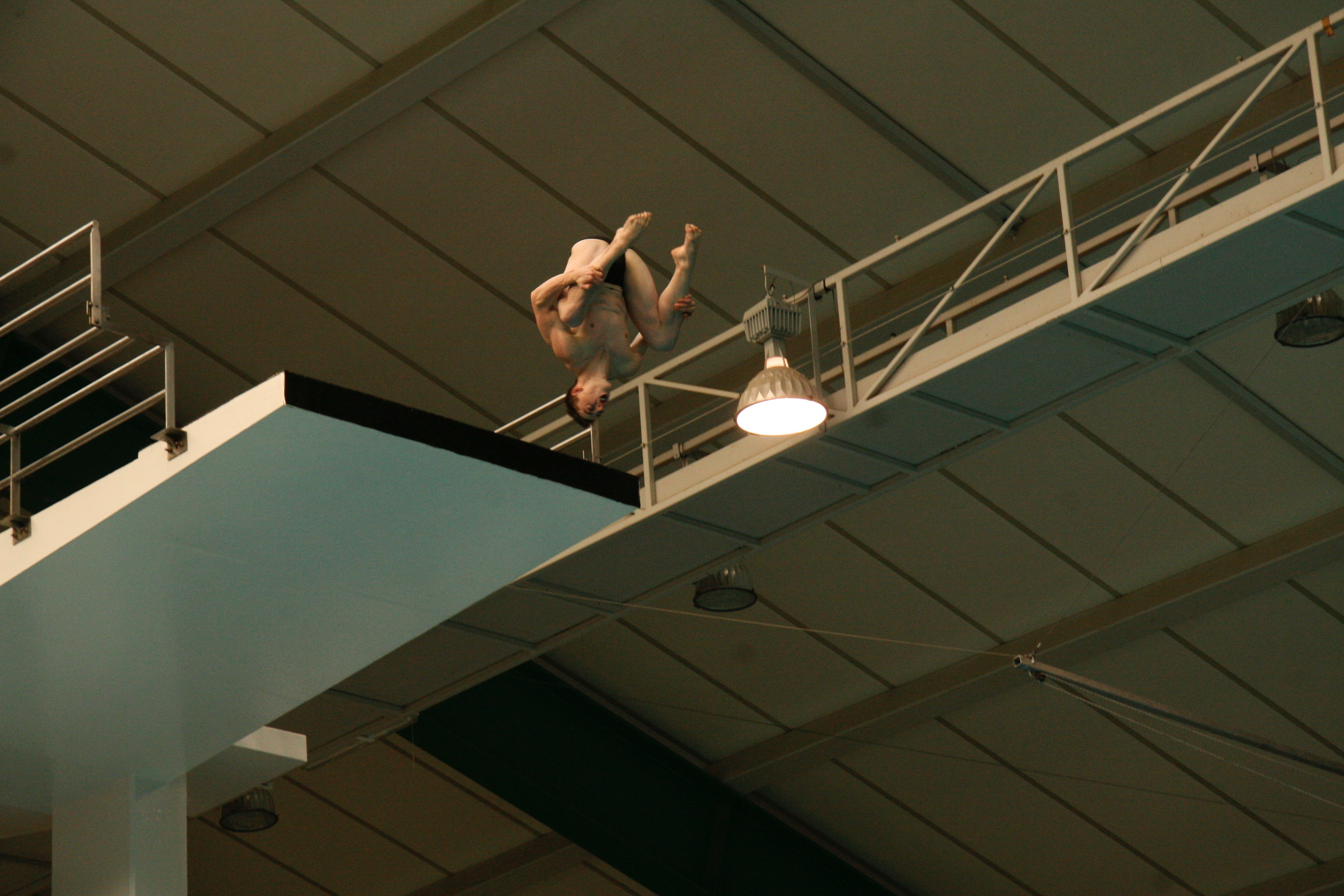
Inward 3 1/2 Tuck - 10m

In 2006 he debuted in his first international senior team at the 2006 Melbourne Commonwealth Games in three events. Scott continued to compete in the 2006 FINA Grand Prix series at the Italian, German, China and American Grand Prix where he placed 2nd behind the Chinese.

In 2007 Scott was named Australian Male Diver of the Year after taking three gold medals at the 2007 Open National Championships. He went on to Final at the 2007 FINA World Championships as well as finish in the top 10 in the 2007 International Grand Prix series.

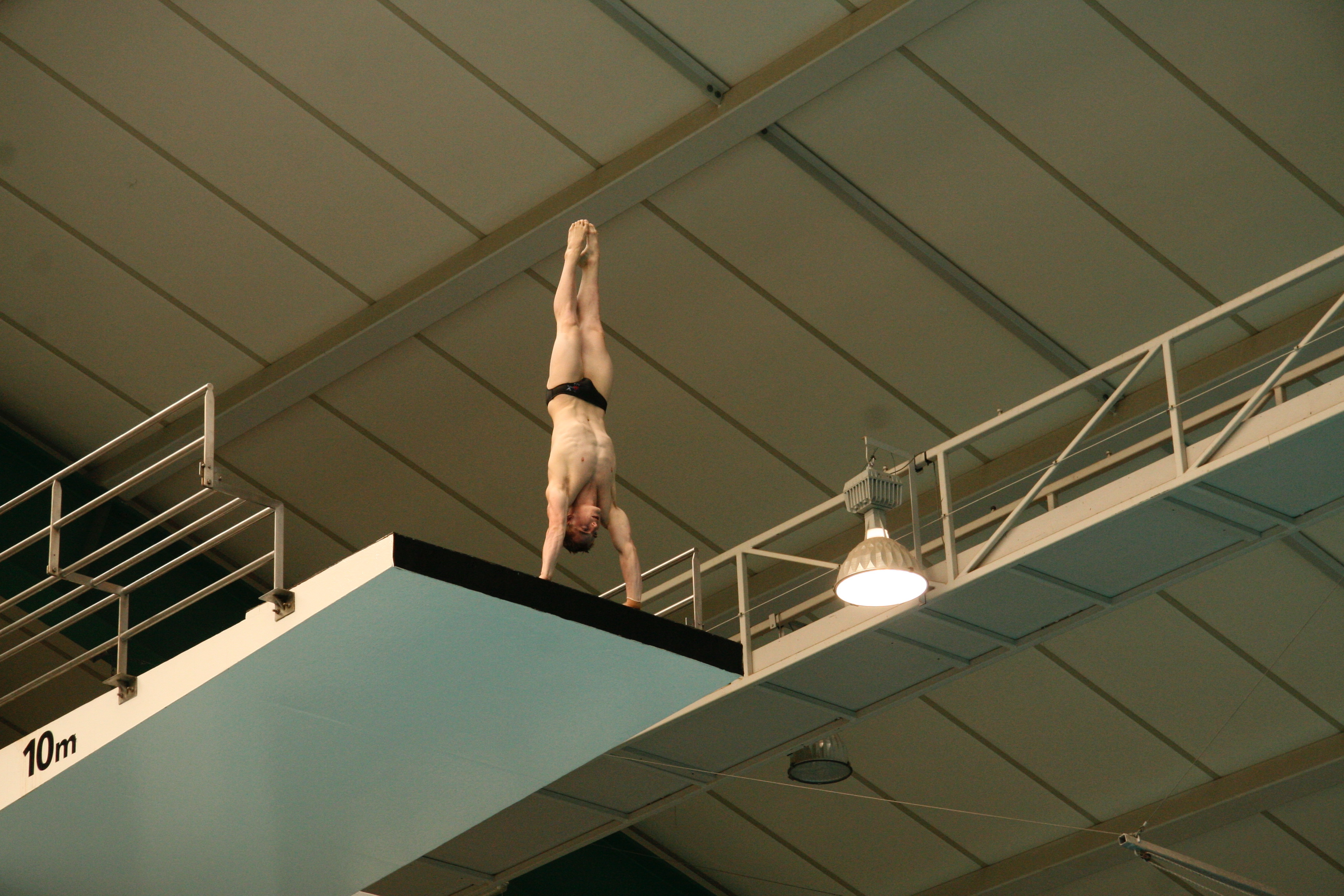

In 2008 Scott was named back to back Australian Male Diver of the Year after taking a gold and two silvers at the Australian Open Championships. Scott went on to compete in the 2008 FINA World Cup as well as winning the Olympic Trials in the Men’s 3m synchronised with partner Robert Newbery.

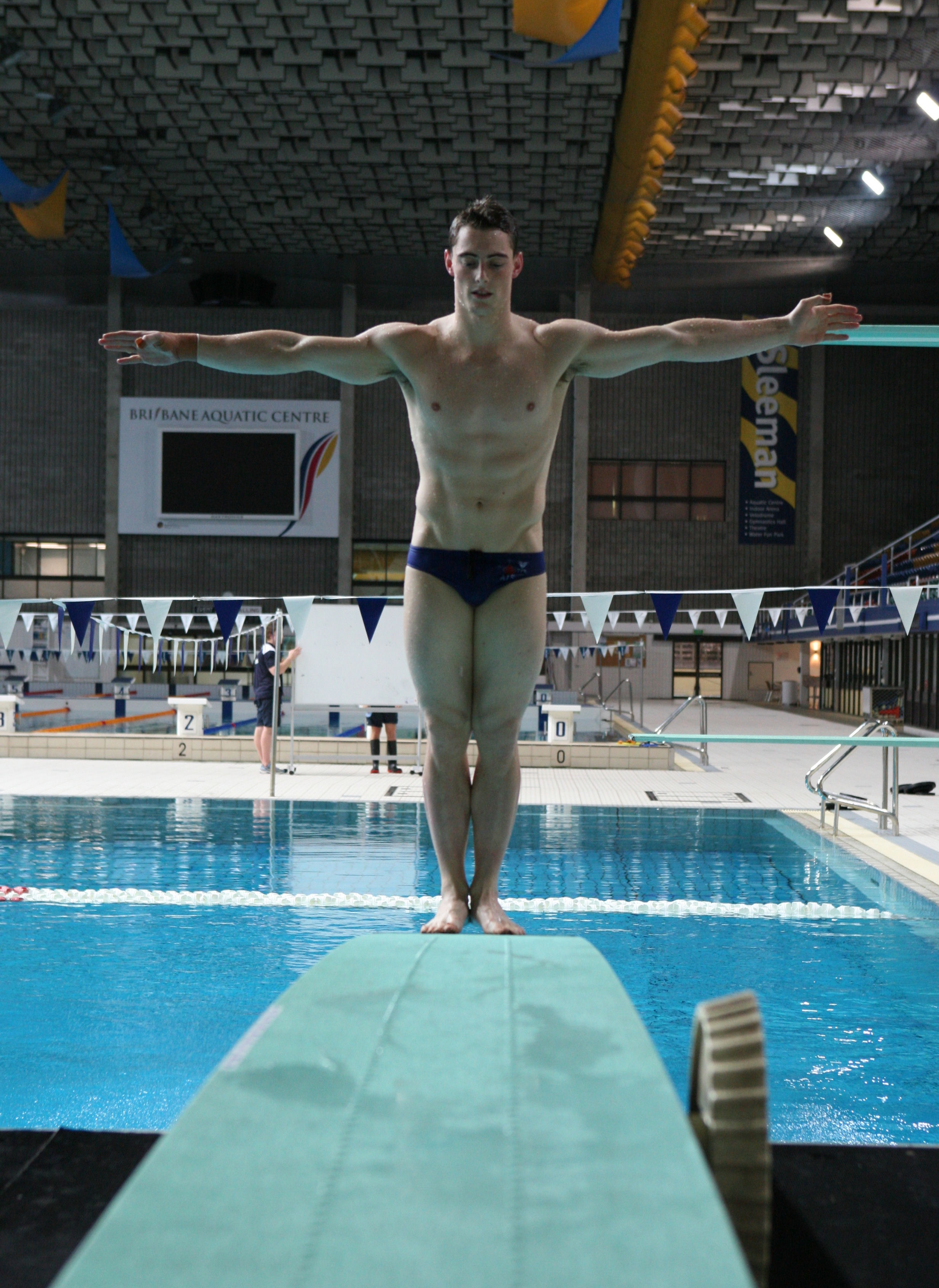

Scott went on to represent Australia at the 2008 Beijing Olympics, however was hampered in his preparation by a broken wrist he sustained while training for the 2008 FINA World Cup. He fractured his scaphoid bone during training from the 10m, which restricted his competitions to the 3m springboard events only. Scott went on to make the Finals at the Beijing Olympics finishing in 8th place.

After the Olympic Games Scott underwent wrist surgery and was restricted to light training throughout the 2009 season.

In 2010 he relocated to Sydney to the New South Wales Institute of Sport to train once again with 2008 Olympic Gold Medallist, Matthew Mitcham and coach Chava Sobrino. After over 12 months out of the National Team and two wrist operations, Scott managed to win two Gold medals and a Bronze medal at the 2010 Australian Open Championships. Scott continued his form in the 2010 FINA Grand Prix series winning a Bronze at the Canadian Grand Prix and finishing with a world ranking of #2 in World Standings. Scott also competed at the 2010 Delhi Commonwealth Games winning a Bronze medal.

While preparing for the 2012 London Olympics Scott sustained a shoulder injury and was forced into retirement after undergoing a shoulder reconstruction in early 2012. Scott continues to coach and is an active board member of Diving NSW.

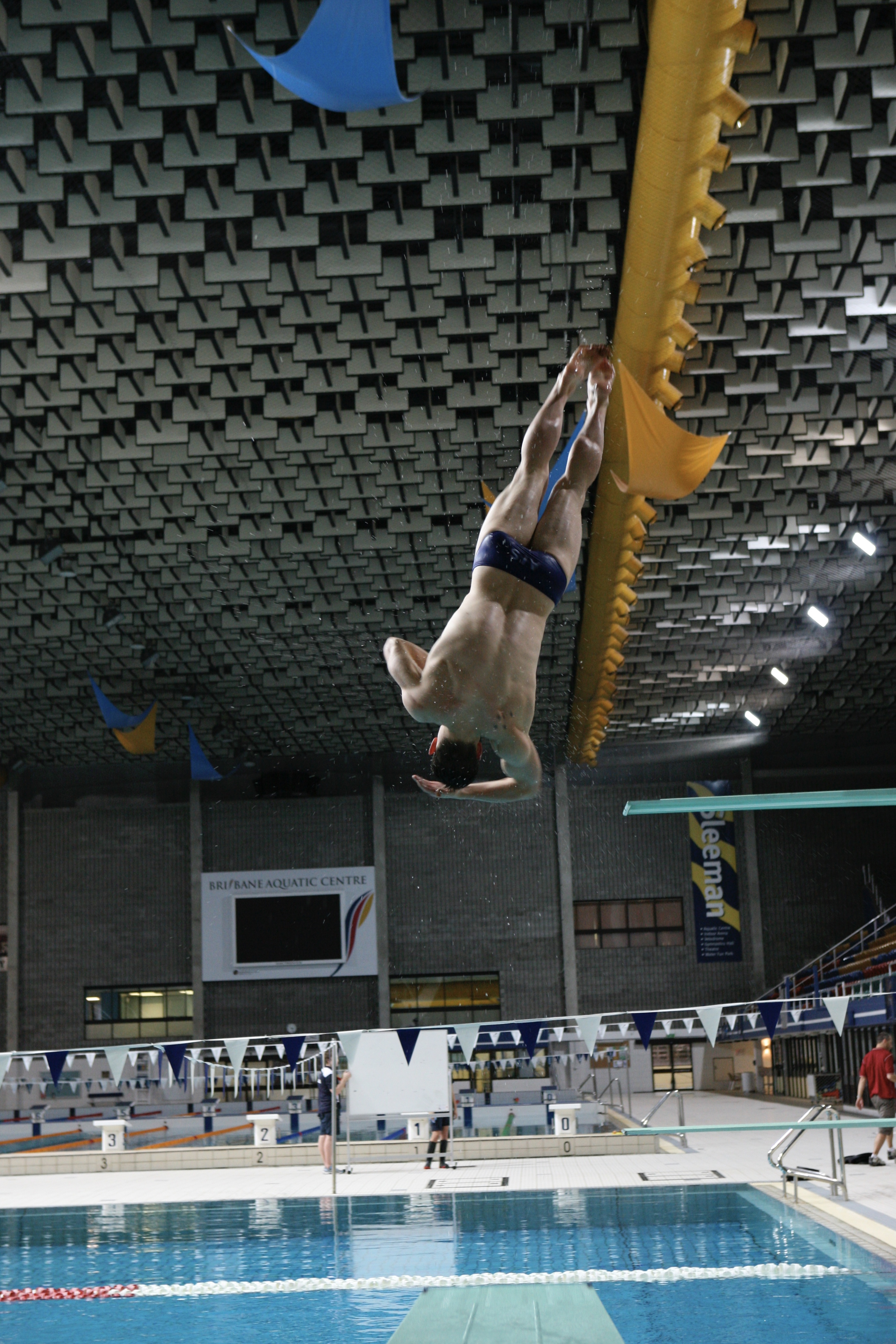
