= Erika Leal-Ramirez =

Mexican synchronized swimmer

Personal information
- Born: July 11, 1977 (age 48) Mexico City, Mexico

Sport
- Sport: Synchronised swimming

Erika Leal-Ramirez (born 11 July 1977) in Mexico City) is a synchronised swimmer who represented Mexico at the 1996 and 2000 Olympic Games and Australia at the 2008 Summer Olympics.

Leal-Ramirez, who is an electrical engineer, moved to Australia in 2003 to do a master's degree at RMIT. This in turn led to permanent residency and a job. She took Australian citizenship in 2007 and became eligible for selection on the Australian team in Beijing. She will compete in the duet with Myriam Glez, who also previously competed at the Olympics for another country, France.
