= Yurema Requena =

Spanish swimmer (born 1983)

Personal information
- Full name: Yurema Requena Juarez
- Nationality: Spanish
- Born: 25 November 1983 (age 41); Villarreal, Castellón, Spain

Sport
- Sport: Swimming

Yurema Requena Juarez (Note: In this Spanish name, the first or paternal surname is Requena and the second or maternal family name is Juarez.) (born 25 November 1983) is a Spanish swimmer who competed in the 2008 Summer Olympics. She was born in Villarreal.
