= Bethany Walsh =

Australian synchronized swimmer

Personal information
- Born: 2 November 1985 (age 40) Melbourne, Australia

Sport
- Sport: Synchronised swimming

Bethany Therese Walsh (born 2 November 1985) is an Australian synchronized swimmer who competed in the 2008 Summer Olympics.
