= Diana Gomes (swimmer) =

Portuguese swimmer

Personal information
- Full name: Diana Duarte Gomes
- National team: Portugal
- Born: 6 July 1989 (age 37) Lisbon, Portugal
- Height: 1.67 m (5 ft 6 in)
- Weight: 54 kg (119 lb)

Sport
- Sport: Swimming
- Strokes: Breaststroke
- Club: Associacão dos Bombeiros; Voluntários dos Estoris
- Coach: Filipe Coelho
Medal record
Women's swimming
Representing Portugal
European Junior Championships
Gold medal – first place	2005 Budapest	100 m breaststroke
Gold medal – first place	2005 Budapest	200 m breaststroke
Bronze medal – third place	2005 Budapest	50 m breaststroke

Diana Duarte Gomes (born July 6, 1989) is a Portuguese swimmer, who specialized in breaststroke events. She is a two-time Olympian and a multiple-time Portuguese record holder for the long and short course breaststroke events (50, 100, and 200 m). She also won three medals (two golds and one bronze) in the same category at the 2005 European Junior Swimming Championships in Budapest, Hungary.

Gomes made her first Olympic team, as Portugal's youngest swimmer (aged 15), at the 2004 Summer Olympics in Athens, Greece. In the 100 m breaststroke, Gomes finished in last place on the fourth heat by four tenths of a second (0.40) behind Croatia's Smiljana Marinović in 1:11.40. In the 200 m breaststroke, Gomes placed twenty-third in the morning prelims with a seasonal best of 2:34.23, nearly two seconds farther from the Portuguese record (2:31.32).

At the 2008 Summer Olympics in Beijing, Gomes qualified for the second time in two swimming events, by clearing FINA B-standard entry times of 1:09.96 (100 m breaststroke) from the European Championships in Eindhoven, Netherlands, and 2:30.35 (200 m breaststroke) from the EDF Swimming Open in Paris, France. In her first event, 100 m breaststroke, Gomes challenged seven other swimmers on the fourth heat, including South Korea's Jung Seul-Ki, and two-time Olympian Inna Kapishina of Belarus. She edged out Kapishina to a third-place sprint by 0.15 of a second, lowering her Olympic time to 1:10.02. In the 200 m breaststroke, Gomes lowered her personal best to 2:30.18, but failed to advance into the semifinals for the second time, as she placed twenty-ninth overall in the preliminaries.

Awards
Preceded by None	Portuguese Sportswoman of the Year; 2005	Succeeded by Vanessa Fernandes
