= Kirsty Balfour =

British swimmer

Personal information
- Full name: Kirsty Balfour
- Nickname: "Balf"
- National team: Great Britain
- Born: 21 February 1984 (age 42) Edinburgh, Scotland
- Height: 1.73 m (5 ft 8 in)
- Weight: 61 kg (134 lb; 9.6 st)

Sport
- Sport: Swimming
- Strokes: Breaststroke
- Club: City of Edinburgh
Medal record
Women's swimming
Representing Great Britain
World Championships (LC)
Silver medal – second place	2007 Melbourne	200 m breaststroke
European Championships (LC)
Gold medal – first place	2006 Budapest	200 m breaststroke
Gold medal – first place	2006 Budapest	4×100 m medley
Silver medal – second place	2006 Budapest	100 m breaststroke
European Championships (SC)
Gold medal – first place	2006 Helsinki	200 m breaststroke
Silver medal – second place	2006 Helsinki	100 m breaststroke
Representing Scotland
Commonwealth Games
Silver medal – second place	2006 Melbourne	200 m breaststroke
Bronze medal – third place	2006 Melbourne	100 m breaststroke

Kirsty Balfour (born 21 February 1984), also known by her married name Kirsty Kettles, is a Scottish former competitive swimmer who represented Great Britain in the Olympic Games, FINA world championships and European championships, and competed for Scotland in the Commonwealth Games. She specialized in breaststroke events.

She won a gold medal in the 200-metre breaststroke at the European Long-Course Championships in 2006, and took silver in same event at the World Championships in Melbourne in 2007.

She announced her retirement from swimming on 7 November 2008, stating she planned to do more work for her church. She got married the following day.

== Personal bests and records held ==
Event	Long course	Short course
50 m breaststroke	29.08 (2006)	31.56 (2008)
100 m breaststroke	1:07.83 (2006)	1:06.37 (2008)
200 m breaststroke	2:24.04 (2006) ^{NR}	2:21.82 (2006) ^{NR}
Record Key NR:British
