= Inna Kapishina =

Belarusian swimmer

Personal information
- Full name: Inna Vitalievna Kapishina
- National team: Belarus
- Born: 30 December 1984 (age 41) Babruysk, Belarusian SSR, Soviet Union
- Height: 1.70 m (5 ft 7 in)
- Weight: 56 kg (123 lb)

Sport
- Sport: Swimming
- Strokes: Breaststroke
- Club: Dynamo Hrodna

Inna Vitalievna Kapishina (Belarusian: Іна Вітальеўна Капішына; born December 30, 1984) is a Belarusian former swimmer, who specialized in breaststroke events. She is a multiple-time Belarusian champion and three-time national record holder in her respective discipline (50, 100, and 200 m).

Kapishina made her Olympic debut at the 2004 Athens Olympics, competing in a breaststroke double. In the 100 m breaststroke, she won the second heat by approximately two seconds ahead of Cuba's Imaday Nuñez Gonzalez in 1:10.66. Her storming victory in the heats missed out a spot in the semifinals, as she finished eighteenth overall by a third of a second (0.33) outside the top-16 field. In her second event, 200 m breaststroke, Kapishina secured a penultimate seed to round out the semifinal roster with a prelims time of 2:31.26, but was eventually disqualified for not following the proper form.

Four years later, Kapishina qualified for her second Belarusian team, as a 23-year-old, at the 2008 Summer Olympics in Beijing. She cleared FINA B-standard entry times of 1:09.16 (100 m breaststroke) and 2:31.02 (200 m breaststroke) from the FINA World Championships in Melbourne, Australia. In the 100 m breaststroke, Kapishina challenged seven other swimmers on the fourth heat, including two-time Olympian Diana Gomes of Portugal. She edged out Turkey's Dilara Buse Günaydın to take the fourth spot by three tenths of a second (0.30) in 1:10.15. Kapishina also won the third heat of the 200 m breaststroke, but missed the semifinals by six hundredths of a second (0.06), in a personal best of 2:27.34.
