= Kate Brookes-Peterson =

Australian swimmer

Personal information
- Born: 14 May 1984 (age 42) Kawakawa, New Zealand

Sport
- Sport: Swimming
Medal record
Representing Australia
World Championships
Bronze medal – third place	2007 Melbourne	5 km open water
Bronze medal – third place	2007 Melbourne	10 km open water

Kate Brookes-Peterson (born 14 May 1984) is an Australian open water swimmer.

She won Australia's first medal at the 2007 FINA World Championships with a bronze in the Women's 5 km open water event. Her result was not without controversy though with German Britta Kamrau-Corestein, whom she beat home for bronze by 0.1 seconds, accusing her of foul play by pulling on her swimming costume. Brookes-Peterson flatly denied the accusation.

She was coached by Australian swimming coach Ken Wood.
