= Oksana Hatamkhanova =

Ukrainian-born Azerbaijani swimmer

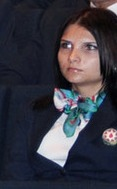

Personal information
- Full name: Oksana Hətəmxanova
- Nationality: Ukraine; Azerbaijan
- Born: June 29, 1990 (age 36) Novyi Buh, Soviet Union (now in Ukraine)
- Height: 1.61 m (5 ft 3 in)
- Weight: 51 kg (112 lb)

Sport
- Sport: Swimming
- Strokes: Breaststroke

Oksana Hatamkhanova (Azeri: Oksana Hətəmxanova; born 29 June 1990 in Novyi Buh, Soviet Union) is a Ukrainian-born Azerbaijani Olympic swimmer. She swam for Azerbaijan in the 2008 and 2012 Olympics, both times qualifying by wild card.

In Beijing, she finished 46th in the 100m breaststroke, failing to advance on to the semifinals.

In London, she came in 4th in her heat in the 100m breaststroke and finished 44th and thus failed to qualify for the semifinals.

She also swam at the 2007 World Championships.
