= Roberta Panara =

Italian swimmer

Personal information
- National team: Italy
- Born: January 12, 1984 (age 42)

Sport
- Sport: Swimming
Medal record
Representing Italy
Mediterranean Games
Gold medal – first place	2009 Pescara	100m breaststroke
Gold medal – first place	2009 Pescara	4x100m medley relay
Bronze medal – third place	2001 Tunis	100m breaststroke
Bronze medal – third place	2001 Tunis	4x100m freestyle relay
Bronze medal – third place	2009 Pescara	50m breaststroke

Roberta Panara (born 12 January 1984) is an Italian swimmer who competed in the 2008 Summer Olympics.
