= Annabelle Carey =

New Zealand swimmer (born 1989)

Personal information
- Full name: Annabelle Jane Carey
- National team: New Zealand
- Born: 11 March 1989 (age 37) Nelson, New Zealand
- Height: 1.68 m (5 ft 6 in)

Sport
- Sport: Swimming
- Strokes: Breaststroke
- Club: Wharenui Swim Club
- Coach: Alistair Johnson

Annabelle Jane Carey (born 11 March 1989) is a New Zealand former competitive swimmer, who specialised in breaststroke events. As of 2006, she currently holds a New Zealand record of 1:09.26 in the 100 m breaststroke from the World Championship Trials in Auckland. In the same year she helped out the New Zealand team to pull off a fourth-place effort in the medley relay at the Commonwealth Games in Melbourne, Australia, with a record-breaking time of 4:06.30.

Carey qualified for two events as New Zealand's youngest swimmer (aged 15) at the 2004 Summer Olympics in Athens. She cleared a FINA B-standard entry time of 1:12.57 (100 m breaststroke) at the Olympic trials in Auckland. In the 100 m breaststroke, she challenged seven other swimmers in the third heat, including fellow 15-year-old Lee Ji-young of South Korea. She rounded out the field to last place and thirty-fifth overall by 0.28 of second, behind Lee in 1:13.21. She also teamed up with Hannah McLean, Elizabeth Coster, and Alison Fitch in the 4 × 100 m medley relay. Swimming the breaststroke leg in heat one, Carey recorded a time of 1:11.98, but the New Zealand team settled for sixth place and thirteenth overall in a final time of 4:10.37.

Carey also sought her second Olympic bid to compete for the New Zealand team in Beijing 2008. She was an all-time favourite in the national trials, campaigning for her second Olympic stint. In an all-important final, Carey lost her goggles upon diving in. She managed to finish in second place behind Zoe Baker, but missed out on an Olympic spot.
