= Ganna Khlistunova =

Ukrainian swimmer (born 1988)

Personal information
- Born: 27 February 1988 (age 38) Rivne, Ukrainian SSR, Soviet Union
- Height: 1.82 m (6 ft 0 in)
- Weight: 61 kg (134 lb)

Sport
- Sport: Swimming
- Club: Spartak-Dynamo Rivne
Medal record
Women's swimming
Representing Ukraine
World Championships (LC)
| Bronze medal – third place | 2007 Melbourne | 100 m breaststroke |
European Championships (LC)
| Gold medal – first place | 2006 Budapest | 100 m breaststroke |
European Championships (SC)
| Gold medal – first place | 2006 Helsinki | 100 m breaststroke |

Ganna Khlistunova (also Hanna or Anna, Ukrainian: Ганна Хлістунова; born 27 February 1988) is a Ukrainian swimmer who won one bronze and two gold medals in the 100 m breaststroke at the 2006 European Aquatics Championships and 2007 World Aquatics Championships. She competed in the same event at the 2008 Summer Olympics, but did not reach the finals.
