= Sarah Bombell =

Australian synchronised swimmer

Personal information
- Nationality: Australia
- Born: 12 April 1983 (age 43) Sydney, New South Wales, Australia
- Height: 167 cm (5 ft 6 in)
- Weight: 60 kg (130 lb)

Sport
- Sport: Swimming
- Strokes: Synchronized swimming
- Club: Schwimm-Union Wien
Medal record
Representing Australia
Synchronised swimming
Commonwealth Games
Bronze medal – third place	2010 Delhi	Women's duet

Sarah Bombell (born 12 April 1983) is an Australian competitor in synchronized swimming and a Commonwealth Games bronze medallist.

Sarah started competing in synchronised swimming at age 10 and represented her national team for the first time in 2004. Sarah also represented Australia at the 2008 Beijing Olympics where she reached 7th place, as well as participating in several World Championships. At the Commonwealth Games in 2010, she won the bronze medal in the women's duet event with Eloise Amberger. She teamed with Amberger at the 2012 Summer Olympics, and was also part of the Australian team, which finished in 8th.
