= Kate Haywood =

British swimmer (born 1987)

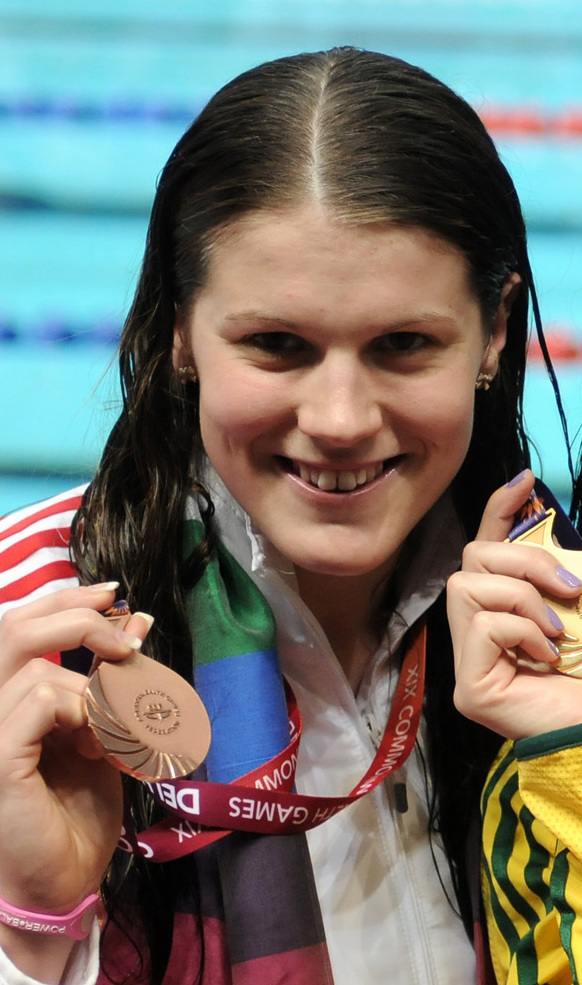

Personal information
- Full name: Kate Emma Haywood
- National team: Great Britain
- Born: 1 April 1987 (age 39) Grimsby, Lincolnshire, England
- Height: 1.78 m (5 ft 10 in)
- Weight: 68 kg (150 lb; 10.7 st)

Sport
- Sport: Swimming
- Strokes: Breaststroke
- College team: Loughborough University
Medal record
Women's swimming
Representing Great Britain
World Championships – Short Course
Silver medal – second place	2008 Manchester	50 m breaststroke
Bronze medal – third place	2008 Manchester	4×100 m medley
European Championships – Long Course
Gold medal – first place	2008 Eindhoven	4×100 m medley
Gold medal – first place	2010 Budapest	4x100 m medley
Silver medal – second place	2006 Budapest	50 m breaststroke
Silver medal – second place	2010 Budapest	50 m breaststroke
European Championships – Short Course
Silver medal – second place	2006 Helsinki	50 m breaststroke
Bronze medal – third place	2004 Vienna	50 m breaststroke
Bronze medal – third place	2006 Helsinki	4×50 m medley
Representing England
Commonwealth Games
Silver medal – second place	2006 Melbourne	4×100 m medley
Silver medal – second place	2010 Delhi	4×100 m medley
Bronze medal – third place	2002 Manchester	4×100 m medley
Bronze medal – third place	2010 Delhi	50 m breaststroke
Bronze medal – third place	2010 Delhi	100 m breaststroke

Kate Emma Haywood (born 1 April 1987) is an English former elite swimmer who competed for Great Britain in the Olympics, FINA world championships, and European championships, and represented England in the Commonwealth Games. She competed predominantly as a breaststroke swimmer. She was the youngest swimmer to represent England in the Commonwealth Games when she qualified for the 2002 Commonwealth Games in Manchester, where she won a bronze medal in the 4×100-metre medley relay. She retired from competitive swimming following the 2012 Summer Olympics.

== Career summary ==
Despite missing out on qualification for the British swim squad at the 2004 Summer Olympics in Athens, Haywood qualified for the 2006 Commonwealth Games in Melbourne, Australia, where she won a silver medal in the 4×100-metre medley relay.

She won a joint silver medal (with Sarah Katoulis of Australia) in the 50-metre breaststroke at the 2008 World Short Course Championships. She competed at the 2008 Olympic Games in Beijing, finishing in 4th place in the British 4×100-metre medley relay team, and reaching the semi-finals in the 100-metre breaststroke. She was forced to miss the 2009 Swimming World Championships in Rome due to a hip injury.

Haywood won the bronze medal in the 50- and 100-metre breaststroke at the 2010 Commonwealth Games in Delhi, India.

After retirement from swimming, Kate has set up a successful personal training business called Straightline Fitness. She consults to people and businesses, helping them achieve their fitness goals.

== Personal life ==
Haywood won the BBC Young Sports Personality of the Year award in 2003.

From 2010, Haywood lived and trained in Melbourne, Australia, under the guidance of Rohan Taylor.

Her great-grandfather was Warneford Cresswell, former Everton and England footballer.

== Personal bests and records held ==
Event	Long course	Short course
50 m breaststroke	31.24 (2010)	30.93 (2005)
100 m breaststroke	1:07.56 (2008) NR	1:05.95 (2008) NR
200 m breaststroke	2.32.40 (2005)	2.31.43 (2003)
Record Key NR:British
