= Asami Kitagawa =

Japanese swimmer (born 1987)

Personal information
- Nationality: Japan
- Born: October 3, 1987 (age 38) Iwatsuki-ku, Saitama, Japan
- Height: 162 cm (5 ft 4 in)
- Weight: 49 kg (108 lb)

Sport
- Sport: Swimming
- Strokes: Breaststroke, IM
Medal record
Pan Pacific Championships
Silver medal – second place	2006 Victoria	200 m breaststroke
Silver medal – second place	2006 Victoria	4x100 m medley

Asami Kitagawa (北川 麻美, Kitagawa Asami) (born October 3, 1987) is a Japanese Olympic and Nation Record holding swimmer. She swam for Japan at the 2008 Olympics.

== Major achievements ==
2006 Doha Asian Games

- 50m breaststroke 2nd (32.27)
- 100m breaststroke 1st (1:09.13)
- 200m breaststroke 4th (2:28.81)
- 200m individual medley 2nd (2:14.51)
- 4 × 100 m medley relay 2nd (4:05.14)

2008 Beijing Olympics

- 100m breaststroke 8th (Heat 1:08.36, Semifinal 1:08.23, Final 1:08.43)
- 200m individual medley 6th (Heat 2:12.47 JR, Semifinal 2:12.02 JR, Final 2:11.56 JR)
- 4 × 100 m freestyle relay 9th (Heat 3:39.25 JR)
- 4 × 100 m medley relay 6th (Heat 3:59.91, Final 3:59.54 JR)

JR: Japanese Record

== Personal bests ==
In long course

- 100m breaststroke: 1:08.23 (August 11, 2008)
- 200m individual medley: 2:11.44 Japanese Record (September 6, 2008)

In short course

- 100m breaststroke: 1:05.17 Asian, Japanese Record (February 21, 2009)
- 100m individual medley: 1:00.01 Japanese Record (February 21, 2009)
- 200m individual medley: 2:08.77 Asian, Japanese Record (February 22, 2009)
