= Tamika Domrow =

Australian synchronized swimmer

Personal information
- Nationality: Australian
- Born: 6 September 1989 (age 37) Brisbane
- Height: 165 cm (5 ft 5 in) (2012)
- Weight: 56 kg (123 lb) (2012)

Sport
- Country: Australia
- Sport: Synchronized swimming
- Club: Gold Coast Mermaids
- Coached by: Anna Nepotacheva, Marina Kholod

Achievements and titles
- Olympic finals: 2008 Summer Olympics, 2012 Summer Olympics

Tamika Domrow (born 6 September 1989) is an Australian synchronized swimmer. She competed in the 2008 Summer Olympics, where her team finished seventh and the 2012 Summer Olympics, where Australia finished in eighth.

== Personal ==
Domrow was born on 6 September 1989 in Brisbane and is from Camp Mountain. She attended Samford State School and St Paul's School, Bald Hills. She has a Certificate in Companion Animal Services. As of 2012, she lives in Brisbane and works for Samford Pet Resort as an apprentice kennel technician. Her employer accommodated her training schedule.

Domrow is 165 centimetres (5 ft 5 in) tall, weighs 56 kilograms (123 lb) and is right handed.

Tamika is married to Mathew Glover.

== Synchronized swimming ==
Domrow is a synchronized swimmer, taking up the sport at the Valley Pool in Brisbane when she was ten years old. In 2008, she was a member of Neptunes Synchronised Swimming Club. As of 2012 a member of the Gold Coast Mermaids. She was coached by Mike Burgess. Her former coach died in July 2008, not long before the 2008 Games. She has been coached by Marina Kholod since 2005.

Domrow broke into Australia's senior national team when she was fifteen years old. In 2007, she competed at the FINA world championships in the team event. The ten person team was the first Australian one to make it in the finals for the synchronised swimming free combination routine.

Domrow competed at the 2008 Summer Olympics as an eighteen-year-old. Her team came in seventh. Prior to going to Beijing, she participated in a ten-day training camp at the Melbourne Sports and Aquatic Centre. Following the Beijing Games, she retired from the sport for eighteen months.

Domrow and Jenny-Lyn Anderson competed in the Open Free Duet at the 2011 National Championships, coming away with a fourth-place finish. In 2012, she competed with the national team at events in Perth, Spain and New Caledonia.

Domrow was selected to represent Australia at the 2012 Summer Olympics in synchronized swimming. She qualified for the Olympics as a member of the national team at the 2011 World Championships in Shanghai. At her second Games, she will be twenty-two years old. In preparation for the Games, she spent up to nine hours a day in the pool.
