= Tarnee White =

Australian swimmer

Personal information
- Full name: Tarnee Renee White
- National team: Australia
- Born: 17 October 1981 (age 44) Redcliffe City, Queensland
- Height: 1.65 m (5 ft 5 in)
- Weight: 58 kg (128 lb)

Sport
- Sport: Swimming
- Strokes: Breaststroke
- Club: Redcliffe Leagues Lawnton; Chandler Swimming Club
Medal record
Women's swimming
Representing Australia
Olympic Games
Gold medal – first place	Beijing 2008	4×100 m medley
Silver medal – second place	Sydney 2000	4×100 m medley
World Championships – Long Course
Gold medal – first place	2001 Fukuoka	4×100 m medley
Gold medal – first place	2007 Melbourne	4×100 m medley
Commonwealth Games
Bronze medal – third place	2002 Manchester	50 m breaststroke
Bronze medal – third place	2006 Melbourne	50 m breaststroke

Tarnee Renee White, OAM (born 17 October 1981), also known by her married name Tarnee Southwell, is an Australian breaststroke swimmer who won a silver medal in the 4×100-metre medley relay at the 2000 Summer Olympics.

Coming from the Redcliffe club in Queensland, and coached by Ken Wood, White made her international debut at the 1999 Pan Pacific Championships in Sydney, where she came 7th in the 100-metre breaststroke.

At the Sydney Olympics the following year, White swum the breaststroke leg in the heats of the 4×100-metre medley relay, in the team that trailed the United States home in the final. She also competed in the 100-metre breaststroke, where she placed 7th.

White competed at the 2001 World Aquatics Championships in Fukuoka, Japan, coming 9th in both the 50-metre and 100-metre breaststroke events. She collected her first individual medal at the 2002 Commonwealth Games in Manchester, when she won bronze in the 50-metre breaststroke.

White missed national selection from 2003 to 2005, when she lost the second breaststroke position to Brooke Hanson. However, she qualified for the 2006 Commonwealth Games in Melbourne. She claimed another bronze, again in the 50-metre breaststroke. She came fourth in the 100-metre breaststroke, narrowly missing bronze. White qualified for the 2008 Beijing Olympics with the second fastest time in the world. She went on to finish 6th in the final of the woman's 100 breastroke in Beijing and won a gold medal for her part in the 4 x 100 medley relay. In 2009, she was awarded and Order of Australian for her contribution to sport.

She was an Australian Institute of Sport scholarship holder.

In 2008, she married Ben Southwell.

== See also ==
- List of Olympic medalists in swimming (women)
