= Samantha Reid (synchronised swimmer) =

Australian synchronised swimmer

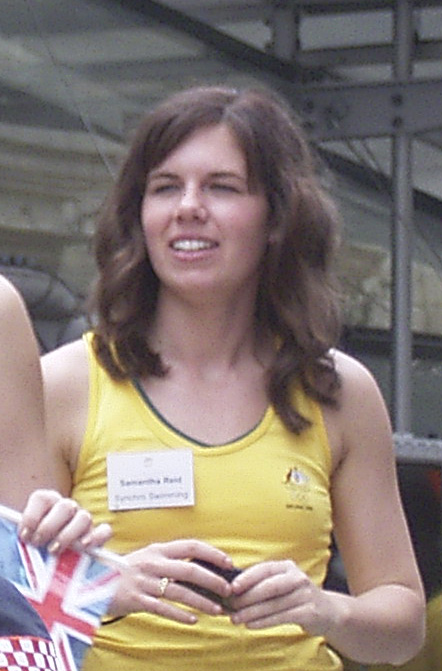

Personal information
- Nationality: Australian
- Born: 28 October 1988 (age 38) Sunnybank, Queensland
- Height: 160 cm (5 ft 3 in) (2012)
- Weight: 50 kg (110 lb) (2012)

Sport
- Country: Australia
- Sport: Synchronised swimming

Samantha Reid (born 28 October 1988) is an Australian synchronised swimmer. She participated in the 2008 Olympics and the 2012 Summer Olympics, representing Australia.

== Personal ==
Reid was born on 28 October 1988 in Sunnybank, Queensland. She attended Kimberley Park State School and then went to high school at Rivermount College. In high school, she played field hockey and volleyball. Reid is 160 centimetres (5 ft 3 in) tall and weighs 50 kilograms (110 lb).

== Synchronised swimming ==
Reid is a synchronised swimmer. She became involved in the sport when she was eight years old because her sister was doing it. She has been coached by Anna Nepotcheva since 2005 and Marina Kholod since 2006. In 2008, she was a member of the Aqualina Synchronised Swimming Club, and a member of the Gold Coast Mermaids in 2012.

Reid competed in the Montreal hosted 2002 World Junior Synchro Championships in 2002. She represented Australia at the 2003 Oceania Synchronised Swimming Championships. At the 2006 Oceania Championships, she came in first. In 2007, she competed at the FINA world championships in the team event. The ten person team was the first Australian one to make it in the finals for the synchronised swimming free combination routine.

Reid competed at the 2008 Summer Olympics. Her team came in seventh, scoring 40,417 in the technical routine, 41,750 in the free routine, 41,333 in technical merit, and 42,167 in artistic impression.

In January 2009, Reid participated in the national team trials in order to earn a spot to compete in the 2010 Commonwealth Games. She finished 4th in the Team event and 12th in the Duet event at the 2010 Swiss Open in Arbon, Switzerland. She finished 6th in the Team event at the 2011 French Open in Paris, France. She finished 9th in the Team event at the 2011 German Open in Bonn, Germany. She finished 17th in the Team event at the 2011 FINA World Championships in Shanghai, China. She finished 18th in the Technical Team event at the 2011 FINA World Championships in Shanghai, China.

Reid was selected to represent Australia at the 2012 Summer Olympics in synchronised swimming. The FINA World Championships held in Shanghai, China served as the 2012 Olympic qualifying event for the team. In the technical team portion, her team finished 18th and in the Free Team event, her team finished 17th and secured a spot at the 2012 Summer Olympics.
