= Tarren Otte =

Australian Olympic synchronized swimmer (born 1984)

Personal information
- Nickname: Tazza
- Nationality: Australian
- Born: 29 March 1984 (age 42) Victoria
- Height: 161 cm (5 ft 3 in) (2012)
- Weight: 58 kg (128 lb) (2012)

Sport
- Country: Australia
- Sport: Synchronized swimming
- College team: Victorian Institute Of Sport
- Club: Golden Fish
- Team: Australian National Team
- Coached by: Anna Nepotacheva, Marina Kholod

Achievements and titles
- Olympic finals: 2012 Summer Olympics, 2008 Summer Olympics

Tarren Otte (born 29 March 1984) is an Australian Olympic synchronized swimmer. She was selected to represent Australia at the 2008 and 2012 Summer Olympics in synchronized swimming.

== Personal ==
Otte was born on 29 March 1984 in Victoria. She earned a Bachelor of Applied Science, enabling her to teach physical education. As of 2012, she lives in Port Melbourne.

Otte is 161 centimetres (5 ft 3 in) tall and weighs 58 kilograms (128 lb).

== Synchronized swimming ==
Otte is a synchronized swimmer, starting in the sport when she was nine years old. She also coaches other synchronized swimmers in Melbourne. Continuing to be involved with sport at times was a struggle because of the finances involved in competing.

In 2007, Otte competed at the FINA world championships in the team event. The ten person team was the first Australian one to make it in the finals for the synchronised swimming free combination routine. As a nineteen-year-old, she competed in the 2008 Summer Olympics. Part of the team's routine included pretending to be emus, kangaroos and crocodiles. Her team came in seventh, scoring 40,417 in the technical routine, 41,750 in the free routine, 41,333 in technical merit, and 42,167 in artistic impression. During the Games, she had a lucky towel.

Otte competed at the 2010 Commonwealth Games and failed to make the podium. She was in fifth place with a score of 39.334 following the first part of the competition. Following the second routine, she finished in fourth place after beating Katrina Abdul Hadi of Malaysia and missing bronze by two points. She had been considered a medal contender going into the Games. Following the Commonwealth Games, she briefly retired from the sport.

Otte was selected to represent Australia at the 2012 Summer Olympics in synchronized swimming. As a twenty-seven-year-old, she was the oldest member of the team. The FINA World Championships held in Shanghai, China served as the 2012 Olympic qualifying event for the team. In the technical team portion, her team finished 18th and in the Free Team event, her team finished 17th.
