= Swimming at the 2003 World Aquatics Championships – Women's 50 metre breaststroke =

Women's 50m Breaststroke at the 2003 FINA World Aquatics Championships
- Venue: Palau Sant Jordi
- Dates: 26 July (prelims + semis); 27 July (final)

Medalists
gold medal	Xuejuan Luo	China
silver medal	Brooke Hanson	Australia
bronze medal	Zoë Baker	Great Britain

The Women's 50m Breaststroke event at the 10th FINA World Aquatics Championships swam on 26–27 July 2003 in Barcelona, Spain. Preliminary heats swam during the morning session on July 26, with the top-16 finishers advancing to Semifinals that evening. The top-8 finishers then advanced to swim again in the Final the next evening.

At the start of the event, the World (WR) and Championship (CR) records were:

- WR: 30.57 swum by Zoë Baker (Great Britain) on July 30, 2002 in Manchester, UK.
- CR: 30.84 swum by Xuejuan Luo (China) on July 27, 2001 in Fukuoka, Japan

== Results ==
=== Final ===
Place	Swimmer	Nation	Time	Notes
1	Xuejuan Luo	China	30.67	
2	Brooke Hanson	Australia	31.13	
3	Zoë Baker	Great Britain	31.37	
4	Leisel Jones	Australia	31.50	
5	Tara Kirk	USA	31.87	
6	Kristy Kowal	USA	31.96	
7	Sarah Poewe	Germany	32.03	
8	Elena Bogomazova	Russia	32.27	

=== Seminfinals ===
Rank	Heat + Lane	Swimmer	Nation	Time	Notes
1	S2 L5	Xuejuan Luo	China	30.64	q, CR
2	S1 L4	Brooke Hanson	Australia	31.11	q
3	S2 L7	Leisel Jones	Australia	31.23	q
4	S2 L4	Zoë Baker	Great Britain	31.29	q
5	S2 L3	Tara Kirk	USA	31.40	q
6	S1 L5	Kristy Kowal	USA	31.79	q
7	S1 L3	Sarah Poewe	Germany	31.94	q
8	S1 L6	Elena Bogomazova	Russia	31.99	q
9	S1 L2	Emma Igelström	Sweden	32.02	
10	S2 L2	Masami Tanaka	Japan	32.07	
11	S2 L8	Madelon Baans	Netherlands	32.14	
12	S1 L1	Roberta Crescentini	Italy	32.21	
13	S2 L1	Vipa Bernhardt	Germany	32.42	
14	S2 L6	Rhiannon Leier	Canada	32.44	
15	S1 L7	Mirna Jukić	Austria	32.46	
16	S1 L8	Yuliya Pidslina	Ukraine	32.57	

=== Preliminaries ===
Rank	Heat+Lane	Swimmer	Nation	Time	Notes
1	H7 L4	Zoë Baker	Great Britain	31.10	q
2	H8 L5	Brooke Hanson	Australia	31.24	q
3	H6 L5	Xuejuan Luo	China	31.49	q
4	H7 L7	Kristy Kowal	United States	31.80	q
5	H7 L6	Tara Kirk	United States	31.81	q
6	H6 L6	Sarah Poewe	Germany	31.96	q
6	H7 L5	Rhiannon Leier	Canada	31.96	q
8	H8 L3	Elena Bogomazova	Russia	31.99	q
9	H7 L2	Masami Tanaka	Japan	32.04	q
10	H8 L4	Emma Igelström	Sweden	32.11	q
11	H6 L4	Leisel Jones	Australia	32.18	q
12	H6 L1	Mirna Jukić	Austria	32.21	q
13	H6 L2	Vipa Bernhardt	Germany	32.30	q
14	H8 L6	Roberta Crescentini	Italy	32.39	q
15	H6 L7	Madelon Baans	Netherlands	32.46	q
16	H6 L3	Yuliya Pidslina	Ukraine	32.54	q
17	H7 L1	Maria Östling	Sweden	32.55	
18	H7 L3	Svitlana Bondarenko	Ukraine	32.56	
19	H8 L7	Majken Thorup	Denmark	32.68	
20	H8 L8	Ágnes Kovács	Hungary	32.73	
21	H8 L2	Emma Robinson	Ireland	32.93	
22	H7 L8	Natalia Hissamutdinova	Estonia	32.94	
23	H5 L7	Carmela Schlegel	Switzerland	33.00	
24	H4 L5	Ingrid Haiden	South Africa	33.36	
25	H5 L5	Tamara Sambrailo	Slovenia	33.37	
25	H5 L6	Lauren Van Oosten	Canada	33.37	
27	H5 L4	Ziada Jardine	South Africa	33.39	
28	H5 L8	Nan Luo	China	33.40	
29	H4 L3	Javiera Salcedo	Argentina	33.89	
30	H5 L3	Maj Hillesund	Norway	33.90	
31	H5 L1	İlkay Dikmen	Turkey	33.98	
31	H8 L1	Salma Zeinhom	Egypt	33.98	
33	H4 L7	Ka Lei Liu	Hong Kong	34.00	
34	H4 L8	Íris Edda Heimisdóttir	Iceland	34.01	
35	H4 L4	Aikaterini Sarakatsani	Greece	34.02	
36	H4 L1	Valeria Silva	Peru	34.08	
37	H4 L2	Ka Yi Suen	Hong Kong	34.19	
38	H4 L6	Patricia Comini-Ribeiro	Brazil	34.73	
39	H3 L4	Varduhi Avetisyan	Armenia	35.59	
40	H3 L3	Katerine Moreno	Bolivia	35.60	
41	H3 L6	Sin Ian Lei	Macau	36.45	
42	H1 L1	Natalya Filina	Azerbaijan	36.58	
43	H2 L6	Roshendra Vrolijk	Aruba	37.18	
44	H3 L2	Éliane Droubry	Ivory Coast	37.20	
45	H3 L7	Samar Nassar	Jordan	37.46	
46	H3 L5	Alessandra Cenni	San Marino	37.96	
47	H3 L8	Melissa Ashby	Grenada	38.14	
48	H2 L4	Sade Daal	Suriname	38.37	
48	H3 L1	N. Ravojanahary	Madagascar	38.37	
50	H2 L7	Doli Akhter	Bangladesh	38.41	
51	H2 L3	Rovena Marku	Albania	39.74	
52	H1 L2	Asanti Mickle	Guyana	40.03	
53	H2 L2	Tojohanitra Andriamanjatoarimanana	Madagascar	40.13	
54	H2 L8	Jakie Wellman	Zambia	42.63	
55	H1 L5	Mariyam Nafha Ali	Maldives	43.53	
56	H1 L7	Evelyn Otto	Palau	44.92	
57	H1 L4	Vilayphone Vongphachanh	Laos	44.50	
58	H2 L5	Ginette Botende	Republic of the Congo	54.51	
-	H6 L8	Smiljana Marinović	Croatia	DQ	
-	-	Ramona Pedretti	Switzerland	DNS	
-	-	Nayana Shakya	Nepal	DNS	
-	-	Amudam Ngyeh Cantile	Cameroon	DNS	
-	-	Shuri Solange Cho	Cameroon	DNS	
