= Swimming at the 2003 World Aquatics Championships – Women's 100 metre breaststroke =

Women's 100m Breaststroke at the 2003 FINA World Aquatics Championships
- Venue: Palau Sant Jordi
- Dates: 21 July (prelims + semis); 22 July (final)

Medalists
| gold medal | Luo Xuejuan | China |
| silver medal | Amanda Beard | United States |
| bronze medal | Leisel Jones | Australia |

The Women's 100m Breaststroke event at the 10th FINA World Aquatics Championships swam on 21–22 July 2003 in Barcelona, Spain. Preliminary heats swam during the morning session on July 21, with the top-16 finishers advancing to Semifinals that evening. The top-8 finishers then advanced to swim again in the Final the next evening.

At the start of the event, the World (WR) and Championship (CR) records were:

- WR: 1:06.52 swum by Penny Heyns (South Africa) on August 23, 1999, in Sydney, Australia.
- CR: 1:07.18 swum by Luo Xuejuan (China) on July 22, 2001, in Fukuoka, Japan

== Results ==
=== Final ===
| Place | Swimmer | Nation | Time | Notes |
|---|---|---|---|---|
| 1 | Luo Xuejuan | China | 1:06.80 | |
| 2 | Amanda Beard | USA | 1:07.42 | |
| 3 | Leisel Jones | Australia | 1:07.47 | |
| 4 | Sarah Poewe | Germany | 1:08.06 | |
| 5 | Tara Kirk | USA | 1:08.30 | |
| 6 | Brooke Hanson | Australia | 1:08.55 | |
| 7 | Mirna Jukić | Austria | 1:08.76 | |
| 8 | Rhiannon Leier | Canada | 1:09.39 | |

=== Semifinals ===
| Rank | Heat + Lane | Swimmer | Nation | Time | Notes |
|---|---|---|---|---|---|
| 1 | S2 L4 | Leisel Jones | Australia | 1:06.37 | q, WR |
| 2 | S1 L4 | Amanda Beard | USA | 1:07.57 | q |
| 3 | S2 L3 | Luo Xuejuan | China | 1:07.76 | q |
| 4 | S1 L5 | Sarah Poewe | Germany | 1:07.88 | q |
| 5 | S2 L7 | Tara Kirk | USA | 1:08.24 | q |
| 6 | S2 L5 | Brooke Hanson | Australia | 1:08.25 | q |
| 7 | S2 L2 | Mirna Jukić | Austria | 1:08.86 | q |
| 8 | S2 L6 | Rhiannon Leier | Canada | 1:09.25 | q |
| 9 | S1 L3 | Vipa Bernhardt | Germany | 1:09.50 | |
| 10 | S1 L2 | Madelon Baans | Netherlands | 1:09.69 | |
| 11 | S1 L6 | Masami Tanaka | Japan | 1:09.77 | |
| 12 | S1 L1 | Emma Igelström | Sweden | 1:10.07 | |
| 13 | S1 L8 | Lauren Van Oosten | Canada | 1:10.15 | |
| 14 | S2 L8 | Maria Östling | Sweden | 1:10.24 | |
| 15 | S1 L7 | Ágnes Kovács | Hungary | 1:10.37 | |
| 16 | S2 L1 | Majken Thorup | Denmark | 1:10.51 | |

=== Preliminaries ===
| Rank | Heat+Lane | Swimmer | Nation | Time | Notes |
|---|---|---|---|---|---|
| 1 | H8 L4 | Leisel Jones | Australia | 1:07.75 | q |
| 2 | H8 L5 | Amanda Beard | United States | 1:08.15 | q |
| 3 | H7 L5 | Brooke Hanson | Australia | 1:08.48 | q |
| 4 | H9 L6 | Sarah Poewe | Germany | 1:08.72 | q |
| 5 | H9 L4 | Luo Xuejuan | China | 1:08.88 | q |
| 6 | H8 L7 | Vipa Bernhardt | Germany | 1:09.00 | q |
| 7 | H9 L7 | Rhiannon Leier | Canada | 1:09.37 | q |
| 8 | H8 L6 | Masami Tanaka | Japan | 1:09.42 | q |
| 9 | H9 L3 | Mirna Jukić | Austria | 1:09.43 | q |
| 10 | H7 L7 | Madelon Baans | Netherlands | 1:09.81 | q |
| 11 | H9 L5 | Tara Kirk | United States | 1:09.83 | q |
| 12 | H8 L2 | Ágnes Kovács | Hungary | 1:10.05 | q |
| 13 | H9 L8 | Majken Thorup | Denmark | 1:10.25 | q |
| 14 | H7 L4 | Emma Igelström | Sweden | 1:10.40 | q |
| 15 | H7 L1 | Maria Östling | Sweden | 1:10.47 | q |
| 16 | H7 L3 | Lauren Van Oosten | Canada | 1:10.53 | q |
| 17 | H6 L6 | Ingrid Haiden | South Africa | 1:10.76 | |
| 18 | H9 L2 | Svitlana Bondarenko | Ukraine | 1:10.79 | |
| 19 | H7 L6 | Luo Nan | China | 1:10.99 | |
| 19 | H7 L2 | Elena Bogomazova | Russia | 1:10.99 | |
| 21 | H9 L1 | Yuliya Pidslina | Ukraine | 1:11.07 | |
| 22 | H8 L3 | Jaime King | Great Britain | 1:11.24 | |
| 23 | H8 L8 | Diana Remenyi | Hungary | 1:11.35 | |
| 24 | H8 L1 | Sara Farina | Italy | 1:11.43 | |
| 25 | H7 L8 | Tamara Sambrailo | Slovenia | 1:11.94 | |
| 26 | H5 L5 | İlkay Dikmen | Turkey | 1:12.06 | |
| 27 | H6 L2 | Smiljana Marinović | Croatia | 1:12.38 | |
| 28 | H6 L7 | Natalia Hissamutdinova | Estonia | 1:12.41 | |
| 29 | H5 L3 | Ramona Pedretti | Switzerland | 1:12.67 | |
| 30 | H6 L1 | Roberta Crescentini | Italy | 1:12.80 | |
| 31 | H5 L2 | Carmela Schlegel | Switzerland | 1:12.84 | |
| 32 | H6 L3 | Salma Zeinhom | Egypt | 1:13.14 | |
| 33 | H6 L8 | Agustina De Giovanni | Argentina | 1:13.20 | |
| 34 | H4 L4 | Íris Edda Heimisdóttir | Iceland | 1:13.28 | |
| 35 | H5 L4 | Ziada Jardine | South Africa | 1:13.47 | |
| 35 | H6 L4 | Aikaterini Sarakatsani | Greece | 1:13.47 | |
| 37 | H6 L5 | Emma Robinson | Ireland | 1:13.55 | |
| 38 | H5 L6 | Javiera Salcedo | Argentina | 1:13.66 | |
| 39 | H4 L5 | Barbara Ferreira | Portugal | 1:14.79 | |
| 40 | H5 L1 | Ka Lei Liu | Hong Kong | 1:15.19 | |
| 41 | H4 L3 | Valeria Silva | Peru | 1:15.44 | |
| 42 | H5 L8 | Patricia Comini-Ribeiro | Brazil | 1:16.04 | |
| 43 | H4 L2 | Ka Yi Suen | Hong Kong | 1:16.43 | |
| 44 | H5 L7 | Yi Ting Siow | Malaysia | 1:17.21 | |
| 45 | H4 L7 | Katerine Moreno | Bolivia | 1:17.61 | |
| 46 | H4 L1 | Varduhi Avetisyan | Armenia | 1:17.67 | |
| 47 | H4 L6 | Natalya Filina | Azerbaijan | 1:19.49 | |
| 48 | H4 L8 | Sin Ian Lei | Macau | 1:19.53 | |
| 49 | H3 L6 | Jamie Shufflebarger | Virgin Islands | 1:19.80 | |
| 50 | H3 L4 | Magdalena Sutanto | Indonesia | 1:20.22 | |
| 51 | H3 L5 | Alessandra Cenni | San Marino | 1:20.84 | |
| 52 | H3 L3 | Sivranjani Vaidyanathan | India | 1:22.41 | |
| 53 | H2 L6 | Roshendra Vrolijk | Aruba | 1:22.97 | |
| 54 | H3 L1 | Samar Nassar | Jordan | 1:23.18 | |
| 55 | H3 L2 | Melissa Ashby | Grenada | 1:23.94 | |
| 56 | H2 L3 | Sade Daal | Suriname | 1:24.61 | |
| 57 | H3 L7 | Liana Ramerison Rabenja | Madagascar | 1:25.48 | |
| 58 | H2 L4 | N. Ravojanahary | Madagascar | 1:26.08 | |
| 59 | H2 L5 | Ana Galindo | Honduras | 1:26.50 | |
| 60 | H2 L7 | Doli Akhter | Bangladesh | 1:27.53 | |
| 61 | H1 L3 | Asanti Mickle | Guyana | 1:30.94 | |
| 62 | H2 L1 | Nayana Shakya | Nepal | 1:34.99 | |
| 63 | H1 L5 | Mariyam Nafha Ali | Maldives | 1:39.28 | |
| 64 | H1 L4 | Pamela Girimbabazi | Rwanda | 1:48.12 | |
| - | H2 L2 | Rovena Marku | Albania | DQ | |
| - | - | Éliane Droubry | Ivory Coast | DNS | |
