= Swimming at the 2003 World Aquatics Championships – Women's 200 metre breaststroke =

Women's 200m Breaststroke at the 2003 FINA World Aquatics Championships
- Dates: 24 July (prelims, semifinals); 25 July (final)
- Winning time: 2 minute 22.99 seconds

Medalists
gold medal	Amanda Beard	United States
silver medal	Leisel Jones	Australia
bronze medal	Hui Qi	China

The Women's 200 Breaststroke event at the 10th FINA World Aquatics Championships swam 24 – 25 July 2003 in Barcelona, Spain. Preliminary and semifinal heats swam on July 24, with the Final swum on July 25.

At the start of the event, the World (WR) and Championship (CR) records were:

- WR: 2:22.99 swum by Hui Qi (China) on 13 April 2001 in Hangzhou, China.
- CR: 2:24.90 swum by Ágnes Kovács (Hungary) on 25 July 2001 in Fukuoka, Japan

== Results ==
=== Final ===
Place	Swimmer	Nation	Time	Notes
1	Amanda Beard	USA	2:22.99	=WR
2	Leisel Jones	Australia	2:24.33	OC
3	Hui Qi	China	2:25.78	
4	Anne Poleska	Germany	2:26.35	
5	Mirna Jukić	Austria	2:26.38	
6	Sarah Poewe	Germany	2:26.72	
7	Masami Tanaka	Japan	2:28.55	
8	Diana Remenyi	Hungary	2:29.20	

=== Semifinals ===
Rank	Heat + Lane	Swimmer	Nation	Time	Notes
1	S1 L4	Amanda Beard	USA	2:25.54	q
2	S2 L3	Hui Qi	China	2:26.30	q
3	S2 L4	Mirna Jukić	Austria	2:26.46	q
4	S2 L5	Anne Poleska	Germany	2:26.53	q
5	S1 L3	Leisel Jones	Australia	2:26.59	q
6	S1 L5	Masami Tanaka	Japan	2:27.62	q
7	S2 L6	Sarah Poewe	Germany	2:27.65	q
8	S1 L2	Diana Remenyi	Hungary	2:28.12	q
9	S2 L2	Ágnes Kovács	Hungary	2:28.18	
10	S2 L7	Beatrice Câșlaru	Romania	2:28.78	
11	S1 L8	Nan Luo	China	2:28.79	
11	S1 L6	Yuliya Pidslina	Ukraine	2:28.79	
13	S1 L7	Kristy Kowal	USA	2:29.19	
14	S2 L8	Lauren van Oosten	Canada	2:30.21	
15	S1 L1	Ingrid Haiden	South Africa	2:31.57	
16	S2 L1	Rhiannon Leier	Canada	2:31.63	

=== Preliminaries ===
Rank	Heat+Lane	Swimmer	Nation	Time	Notes
1	H5 L4	Mirna Jukić	Austria	2:27.91	q
2	H4 L4	Amanda Beard	United States	2:27.95	q
3	H4 L3	Anne Poleska	Germany	2:28.34	q
4	H4 L5	Masami Tanaka	Japan	2:28.58	q
5	H6 L4	Hui Qi	China	2:28.74	q
6	H6 L5	Leisel Jones	Australia	2:28.79	q
7	H6 L6	Sarah Poewe	Germany	2:28.90	q
8	H6 L2	Yuliya Pidslina	Ukraine	2:28.97	q
9	H4 L6	Ágnes Kovács	Hungary	2:29.74	q
10	H5 L6	Diana Remenyi	Hungary	2:29.79	q
11	H4 L7	Beatrice Câșlaru	Romania	2:29.84	q
12	H5 L5	Kristy Kowal	United States	2:30.41	q
13	H4 L1	Rhiannon Leier	Canada	2:30.71	q
14	H3 L4	Ingrid Haiden	South Africa	2:31.37	q
15	H6 L1	Lauren Van Oosten	Canada	2:31.41	q
16	H6 L3	Nan Luo	China	2:31.42	q
17	H5 L2	Sarah Katsoulis	Australia	2:31.89	
18	H6 L7	Elena Bogomazova	Russia	2:32.44	
19	H5 L7	Sara Farina	Italy	2:32.82	
20	H5 L8	İlkay Dikmen	Turkey	2:33.31	
21	H2 L5	Tamara Sambrailo	Slovenia	2:34.14	
22	H5 L3	Emma Igelström	Sweden	2:35.03	
23	H3 L3	Natalia Hissamutdinova	Estonia	2:35.42	
24	H3 L2	Ramona Pedretti	Switzerland	2:35.94	
25	H3 L1	Oleksandra Bogata	Ukraine	2:36.48	
26	H3 L7	Barbara Ferreira	Portugal	2:36.69	
27	H3 L5	Yi Ting Siow	Malaysia	2:36.77	
28	H2 L3	Elisabeth Jarland	Norway	2:36.96	
29	H3 L6	Joanna Maranhão	Brazil	2:37.59	
30	H3 L8	Íris Edda Heimisdóttir	Iceland	2:38.04	
31	H6 L8	Agustina De Giovanni	Argentina	2:38.81	
32	H2 L4	Carmela Schlegel	Switzerland	2:42.05	
33	H5 L1	Salma Zeinhom	Egypt	2:43.72	
34	H1 L5	Katerine Moreno	Bolivia	2:44.99	
35	H2 L6	Ka Lei Liu	Hong Kong	2:46.00	
36	H2 L8	Sin Ian Lei	Macau	2:47.50	
37	H2 L7	Magdalena Sutanto	Indonesia	2:51.79	
38	H1 L3	Jamie Shufflebarger	Virgin Islands	2:52.72	
39	H1 L4	Alessandra Cenni	San Marino	2:56.42	
40	H1 L6	Éliane Droubry	Ivory Coast	2:57.51	
41	H2 L2	Natalya Filina	Azerbaijan	2:58.67	
42	H1 L2	Roshendra Vrolijk	Aruba	3:02.93	
43	H1 L7	N. Ravojanahary	Madagascar	3:07.03	
-	H2 L1	Valeria Silva	Peru	DQ	
-	-	Jaime King	Great Britain	DNS	
-	-	Smiljana Marinović	Croatia	DNS	
