= Swimming at the 2004 Summer Olympics – Women's 100 metre breaststroke =

Women's 100 metre breaststroke at the Games of the XXVIII Olympiad
- Venue: Athens Olympic Aquatic Centre
- Date: August 15, 2004 (heats & semifinals); August 16, 2004 (final)
- Competitors: 48 from 43 nations
- Winning time: 1:06.64 OR

Medalists
1st place, gold medalist(s)		Luo Xuejuan	China
2nd place, silver medalist(s)		Brooke Hanson	Australia
3rd place, bronze medalist(s)		Leisel Jones	Australia

The women's 100 metre breaststroke event at the 2004 Olympic Games was contested at the Olympic Aquatic Centre of the Athens Olympic Sports Complex in Athens, Greece on August 15 and 16.

Chinese swimmer and triple world champion Luo Xuejuan won the gold medal in this event, with an Olympic record time of 1:06.64, missing the world record by 0.27 of a second. Australia's Brooke Hanson took home the silver at 1:07.15, while her teammate and world record holder Leisel Jones, who won silver as a 15-year-old in Sydney (2000), finished behind Hanson for a bronze medal by a hundredth of a second (0.01), with a time of 1:07.16. In 2007, Luo announced her official retirement from swimming, because of heart ailments that had plagued her and had caused fainting spells during her training.

== Records ==
Prior to this competition, the existing world and Olympic records were as follows.

World record	Leisel Jones (AUS)	1:06.37	Barcelona, Spain	21 July 2003
Olympic record	Penny Heyns (RSA)	1:07.02	Atlanta, United States	21 July 1996

The following new world and Olympic records were set during this competition.

Date	Event	Name	Nationality	Time	Record
August 15	Semifinal 1	Leisel Jones	Australia	1:06.78	OR
August 16	Final	Luo Xuejuan	China	1:06.64	OR

== Results ==
=== Heats ===
Rank	Heat	Lane	Name	Nationality	Time	Notes
1	4	4	Brooke Hanson	Australia	1:07.35	Q
2	6	4	Leisel Jones	Australia	1:07.69	Q
3	6	5	Tara Kirk	United States	1:07.92	Q
4	4	5	Sarah Poewe	Germany	1:07.97	Q
5	5	5	Amanda Beard	United States	1:08.04	Q
6	5	4	Luo Xuejuan	China	1:09.07	Q
7	5	3	Qi Hui	China	1:09.29	Q
8	4	2	Svitlana Bondarenko	Ukraine	1:09.35	Q
9	6	3	Rhiannon Leier	Canada	1:09.38	Q
10	5	6	Masami Tanaka	Japan	1:09.44	Q
11	6	7	Ágnes Kovács	Hungary	1:09.51	Q
12	6	2	Vipa Bernhardt	Germany	1:09.60	Q
13	4	6	Lauren van Oosten	Canada	1:09.93	Q
14	4	3	Mirna Jukić	Austria	1:09.99	Q
15	6	6	Elena Bogomazova	Russia	1:10.24	Q
16	5	7	Chiara Boggiatto	Italy	1:10.33	Q
17	5	2	Maria Östling	Sweden	1:10.45	
18	2	4	Inna Kapishina	Belarus	1:10.66	
19	4	7	Majken Thorup	Denmark	1:10.97	
20	4	8	Smiljana Marinović	Croatia	1:11.00	
21	5	1	Madelon Baans	Netherlands	1:11.10	
22	3	2	Marina Kuč	Serbia and Montenegro	1:11.27	
23	6	8	Eeva Saarinen	Finland	1:11.39	
24	4	1	Diana Gomes	Portugal	1:11.40	
24	6	1	Emma Robinson	Ireland	1:11.40	
26	3	3	Ilkay Dikmen	Turkey	1:11.69	
27	2	1	Imaday Nuñez Gonzalez	Cuba	1:12.14	
28	3	5	Salama Ismail	Egypt	1:12.20	
29	3	6	Javiera Salcedo	Argentina	1:12.46	
29	5	8	Aikaterini Sarakatsani	Greece	1:12.46	
31	3	8	Jaclyn Pangilinan	Philippines	1:12.47	
32	2	6	Alia Atkinson	Jamaica	1:12.53	
33	3	7	Nicolette Teo	Singapore	1:12.87	
34	3	4	Lee Ji-young	South Korea	1:12.93	
35	3	1	Annabelle Carey	New Zealand	1:13.21	
36	2	2	Siow Yi Ting	Malaysia	1:13.30	
37	2	7	Valeria Silva	Peru	1:13.52	
38	2	3	Adriana Marmolejo	Mexico	1:14.35	
39	2	5	Yip Tsz Wa	Hong Kong	1:14.53	
40	2	8	Íris Edda Heimisdóttir	Iceland	1:15.35	
41	1	3	Katerine Moreno	Bolivia	1:18.25	
42	1	4	Varduhi Avetisyan	Armenia	1:18.87	
43	1	5	Shrone Austin	Seychelles	1:19.02	
44	1	6	Nataliya Filina	Azerbaijan	1:20.21	
45	1	2	Melissa Ashby	Grenada	1:22.67	
46	1	8	Mariam Pauline Keita	Mali	1:30.40	
47	1	7	Nayana Shakya	Nepal	1:32.92	
48	1	1	Pamela Girimbabazi	Rwanda	1:50.39	

=== Semifinals ===
==== Semifinal 1 ====
Rank	Lane	Name	Nationality	Time	Notes
1	4	Leisel Jones	Australia	1:06.78	Q, OR
2	5	Sarah Poewe	Germany	1:07.48	Q
3	6	Svitlana Bondarenko	Ukraine	1:08.28	Q
4	3	Luo Xuejuan	China	1:08.57	Q
5	2	Masami Tanaka	Japan	1:09.11	
6	7	Vipa Bernhardt	Germany	1:09.72	
7	1	Mirna Jukić	Austria	1:10.06	
8	8	Chiara Boggiatto	Italy	1:10.84	

==== Semifinal 2 ====
Rank	Lane	Name	Nationality	Time	Notes
1	5	Tara Kirk	United States	1:07.60	Q
2	4	Brooke Hanson	Australia	1:07.75	Q
3	3	Amanda Beard	United States	1:07.92	Q
4	6	Qi Hui	China	1:09.06	Q
5	7	Ágnes Kovács	Hungary	1:09.12	
6	1	Lauren van Oosten	Canada	1:09.45	
7	2	Rhiannon Leier	Canada	1:09.46	
8	8	Elena Bogomazova	Russia	1:10.41	

=== Final ===
Rank	Lane	Name	Nationality	Time	Notes
1st place, gold medalist(s)	1	Luo Xuejuan	China	1:06.64	OR
2nd place, silver medalist(s)	6	Brooke Hanson	Australia	1:07.15	
3rd place, bronze medalist(s)	4	Leisel Jones	Australia	1:07.16	
4	2	Amanda Beard	United States	1:07.44	
5	5	Sarah Poewe	Germany	1:07.53	
6	3	Tara Kirk	United States	1:07.59	
7	7	Svitlana Bondarenko	Ukraine	1:08.19	
	8	Qi Hui	China	DSQ	
