= Swimming at the 2004 Summer Olympics – Women's 200 metre breaststroke =

Women's 200 metre breaststroke at the Games of the XXVIII Olympiad
- Venue: Athens Olympic Aquatic Centre
- Date: August 18, 2004 (heats & semifinals); August 19, 2004 (final)
- Competitors: 33 from 28 nations
- Winning time: 2:23.37 OR

Medalists
1st place, gold medalist(s)		Amanda Beard	United States
2nd place, silver medalist(s)		Leisel Jones	Australia
3rd place, bronze medalist(s)		Anne Poleska	Germany

The women's 200 metre breaststroke event at the 2004 Olympic Games was contested at the Olympic Aquatic Centre of the Athens Olympic Sports Complex in Athens, Greece on August 18 and 19.

U.S. swimmer and world-record holder Amanda Beard completed a full set of medals in the event, adding a gold to her silver from Atlanta (1996) and bronze from Sydney (2000). She posted an Olympic record of 2:23.37, holding off Australia's Leisel Jones by 0.23 of a second for a silver medal in 2:23.60. Anne Poleska, who had been seventh at the halfway mark, moved quickly into the field and finished strongly with a bronze in a personal best of 2:25.82, earning Germany's first individual medal of the meet since its reunification in 1990.

Hungary's Ágnes Kovács, the gold medalist from Sydney, finished outside the medals in fifth place behind Japan's Masami Tanaka with a time of 2:26.12.

== Records ==
Prior to this competition, the existing world and Olympic records were:

World record	Amanda Beard (USA)	2:22.44	Long Beach, United States	12 July 2004
Olympic record	Ágnes Kovács (HUN)	2:24.03	Sydney, Australia	20 September 2000

The following new world and Olympic records were set during this competition.

Date	Event	Name	Nationality	Time	Record
19 August	Final	Amanda Beard	United States	2:23.37	OR

== Results ==
=== Heats ===
Rank	Heat	Lane	Name	Nationality	Time	Notes
1	4	4	Leisel Jones	Australia	2:26.02	Q
2	3	3	Anne Poleska	Germany	2:26.48	Q
3	5	4	Amanda Beard	United States	2:26.61	Q
4	5	2	Ágnes Kovács	Hungary	2:26.90	Q
5	4	3	Masami Tanaka	Japan	2:26.91	Q
6	4	5	Brooke Hanson	Australia	2:27.38	Q
7	3	5	Birte Steven	Germany	2:27.42	Q
8	5	6	Caroline Bruce	United States	2:27.82	Q
9	3	4	Mirna Jukić	Austria	2:28.28	Q
10	5	5	Qi Hui	China	2:28.66	Q
11	4	6	Kirsty Balfour	Great Britain	2:29.78	Q
12	3	2	Chiara Boggiatto	Italy	2:30.32	Q
13	2	3	Marina Kuč	Serbia and Montenegro	2:30.39	Q
14	4	2	Lauren van Oosten	Canada	2:30.44	Q
15	4	8	Inna Kapishina	Belarus	2:31.26	Q
16	5	7	Elena Bogomazova	Russia	2:31.49	Q
17	4	1	Smiljana Marinović	Croatia	2:32.52	
18	4	7	Alenka Kejžar	Slovenia	2:32.64	
19	2	5	Ilkay Dikmen	Turkey	2:32.69	
20	1	3	Jaclyn Pangilinan	Philippines	2:33.38	NR
21	5	8	Siow Yi Ting	Malaysia	2:33.79	
22	1	5	Eeva Saarinen	Finland	2:34.17	
23	3	7	Diana Gomes	Portugal	2:34.23	
24	5	1	Lee Ji-young	South Korea	2:34.55	
25	2	7	Majken Thorup	Denmark	2:35.29	
26	2	6	Agustina de Giovanni	Argentina	2:35.94	
27	2	4	Adriana Marmolejo	Mexico	2:36.10	
28	2	2	Imaday Nuñez Gonzalez	Cuba	2:36.40	
29	3	8	Iryna Maystruk	Ukraine	2:37.42	
30	1	4	Nicolette Teo	Singapore	2:38.17	
31	3	1	Athina Tzavella	Greece	2:40.18	
	3	6	Diana Remenyi	Hungary	DNS	
	5	3	Luo Xuejuan	China	DNS	

=== Semifinals ===
==== Semifinal 1 ====
Rank	Lane	Name	Nationality	Time	Notes
1	3	Brooke Hanson	Australia	2:26.43	Q
2	4	Anne Poleska	Germany	2:26.59	Q
3	5	Ágnes Kovács	Hungary	2:26.63	Q
4	2	Qi Hui	China	2:26.75	Q
5	6	Caroline Bruce	United States	2:27.60	
6	8	Elena Bogomazova	Russia	2:30.35	
7	1	Lauren van Oosten	Canada	2:30.39	
8	7	Chiara Boggiatto	Italy	2:30.76	

==== Semifinal 2 ====
Rank	Lane	Name	Nationality	Time	Notes
1	5	Amanda Beard	United States	2:25.62	Q
2	3	Masami Tanaka	Japan	2:26.38	Q
3	4	Leisel Jones	Australia	2:26.71	Q
4	2	Mirna Jukić	Austria	2:26.95	Q
5	7	Kirsty Balfour	Great Britain	2:28.92	
6	6	Birte Steven	Germany	2:29.22	
7	1	Marina Kuč	Serbia and Montenegro	2:31.77	
	8	Inna Kapishina	Belarus	DSQ	

=== Final ===
Rank	Lane	Name	Nationality	Time	Notes
1st place, gold medalist(s)	4	Amanda Beard	United States	2:23.37	OR
2nd place, silver medalist(s)	7	Leisel Jones	Australia	2:23.60	
3rd place, bronze medalist(s)	6	Anne Poleska	Germany	2:25.82	
4	5	Masami Tanaka	Japan	2:25.87	
5	2	Ágnes Kovács	Hungary	2:26.12	
6	1	Qi Hui	China	2:26.35	
7	8	Mirna Jukić	Austria	2:26.36	
8	3	Brooke Hanson	Australia	2:26.39	
