= Swimming at the 2005 World Aquatics Championships – Women's 200 metre breaststroke =

Women's 200 Breaststroke at the 2005 FINA World Aquatics Championships
- Dates: 28 July (prelims, semifinals); 29 July (final)
- Competitors: 42 from 32 nations
- Winning time: 2:21.72 WR

Medalists
| gold medal | Leisel Jones | Australia |
| silver medal | Anne Poleska | Germany |
| bronze medal | Mirna Jukić | Austria |

The women's 200 breaststroke event at the 11th FINA World Aquatics Championships swam 28–29 July 2005 in Montreal, Canada. Preliminary and Semifinal heats swam on 28 July, with the Prelims during the morning session and the Semifinals during the evening session. The Final swam in the evening session on 29 July.

At the start of the event, the existing World (WR) and Championships (CR) records were:

- WR: 2:22.44, Amanda Beard (USA) swum 12 July 2004 in Long Beach, USA
- CR: 2:22.99, Amanda Beard (USA) swum 25 July 2003 in Barcelona, Spain

== Results ==
=== Preliminaries ===
| Rank | Heat + Lane | Swimmer | Nation | Time | Notes |
|---|---|---|---|---|---|
| 1 | H4 L5 | Anne Poleska | Germany | 2:27.31 | q |
| 2 | H6 L4 | Leisel Jones | Australia | 2:27.63 | q |
| 3 | H5 L3 | Megumi Taneda | Japan | 2:28.06 | q |
| 4 | H6 L2 | Katarzyna Dulian | Poland | 2:28.45 | q |
| 5 | H5 L4 | Mirna Jukić | Austria | 2:28.47 | q |
| 6 | H6 L5 | Chiara Boggiatto | Italy | 2:28.75 | q |
| 7 | H4 L2 | Suzaan van Biljon | South Africa | 2:29.02 | q |
| 8 | H4 L3 | Ekaterina Kormatcheva | Russia | 2:29.07 | q |
| 9 | H5 L7 | Tamaryn Laubscher | South Africa | 2:29.80 | q |
| 10 | H5 L5 | Kristen Caverly | United States | 2:30.03 | q |
| 11 | H5 L6 | Nanaka Tamura | Japan | 2:30.52 | q |
| 12 | H6 L7 | Diana Gomes | Portugal | 2:30.59 | q |
| 13 | H6 L8 | Christin Petelski | Canada | 2:30.75 | q |
| 14 | H5 L1 | Seul-Ki Jung | South Korea | 2:30.82 | q |
| 15 | H6 L6 | Sara Pérez | Spain | 2:30.93 | q |
| 16 | H4 L4 | Tara Kirk | United States | 2:31.48 | q |
| 17 | H4 L1 | Kathleen Stoody | Canada | 2:32.18 | |
| 18 | H4 L8 | Yi Ting Siow | Malaysia | 2:32.47 | |
| 19 | H5 L8 | Josefin Wede | Sweden | 2:32.48 | |
| 20 | H6 L3 | Kirsty Balfour | Great Britain | 2:32.93 | |
| 21 | H4 L6 | Elena Bogomazova | Russia | 2:33.41 | |
| 22 | H3 L4 | Ina Kapishina | Belarus | 2:33.80 | |
| 23 | H6 L1 | Kelly Bentley | New Zealand | 2:33.93 | |
| 24 | H4 L7 | Marina Kuč | Serbia and Montenegro | 2:34.04 | |
| 25 | H3 L6 | Su Yeon Back | South Korea | 2:34.89 | |
| 26 | H3 L7 | Binan Wu | China | 2:34.94 | |
| 27 | H3 L2 | Eeva Saarinen | Finland | 2:35.60 | |
| 28 | H3 L8 | Tamara Sambrailo | Slovenia | 2:35.75 | |
| 29 | H2 L4 | Petra Chocova | Czech Republic | 2:35.98 | |
| 30 | H5 L2 | Angeliki Exarchou | Greece | 2:36.18 | |
| 31 | H2 L1 | Annabelle Carey | New Zealand | 2:36.72 | |
| 32 | H2 L5 | Chenfei Ma | China | 2:38.54 | |
| 33 | H3 L1 | Man-Hsu Lin | Chinese Taipei | 2:41.11 | |
| 34 | H2 L7 | Nicolette Teo | Singapore | 2:42.71 | |
| 35 | H2 L3 | Yu-Chia Tong | Chinese Taipei | 2:43.61 | |
| 36 | H2 L6 | Alia Atkinson | Jamaica | 2:44.17 | |
| 37 | H2 L2 | Qiyu Sandy Mo | Singapore | 2:44.22 | |
| 38 | H1 L4 | Dannielle Van Zijl | Namibia | 2:44.80 | |
| 39 | H1 L5 | Sin Ian Lei | Macau | 2:52.20 | |
| 40 | H1 L3 | Mayumi Raheem | Sri Lanka | 2:56.09 | |
| -- | -- | Julie Hjorth-Hansen | Denmark | DNS | |
| -- | -- | Smiljana Marinović | Croatia | DNS | |

=== Semifinals ===
| Rank | Heat + Lane | Swimmer | Nation | Time | Notes |
|---|---|---|---|---|---|
| 1 | S1 L4 | Leisel Jones | Australia | 2:25.30 | q |
| 2 | S2 L4 | Anne Poleska | Germany | 2:26.22 | q |
| 3 | S2 L3 | Mirna Jukić | Austria | 2:26.85 | q |
| 4 | S1 L8 | Tara Kirk | USA | 2:27.31 | q |
| 5 | S2 L5 | Megumi Taneda | Japan | 2:27.70 | q |
| 6 | S1 L5 | Katarzyna Dulian | Poland | 2:27.96 | q |
| 7 | S2 L6 | Suzaan van Biljon | South Africa | 2:28.09 | q |
| 8 | S1 L2 | Kristen Caverly | USA | 2:28.82 | q |
| 9 | S1 L3 | Chiara Boggiatto | Italy | 2:28.87 | |
| 10 | S2 L2 | Tamaryn Laubscher | South Africa | 2:28.90 | |
| 11 | S2 L8 | Sara Pérez | Spain | 2:29.56 | |
| 12 | S2 L7 | Nanaka Tamura | Japan | 2:29.68 | |
| 13 | S1 L6 | Ekaterina Kormatcheva | Russia | 2:30.23 | |
| 14 | S1 L7 | Diana Gomes | Portugal | 2:30.29 | |
| 15 | S1 L1 | Seul-Ki Jung | South Korea | 2:30.33 | |
| 16 | S2 L1 | Christin Petelski | Canada | 2:31.18 | |

=== Final ===
| Place | Swimmer | Nation | Time | Notes |
|---|---|---|---|---|
| 1 | Leisel Jones | Australia | 2:21.72 | WR |
| 2 | Anne Poleska | Germany | 2:25.84 | |
| 3 | Mirna Jukić | Austria | 2:27.11 | |
| 4 | Megumi Taneda | Japan | 2:27.65 | |
| 5 | Katarzyna Dulian | Poland | 2:27.85 | |
| 6 | Tara Kirk | USA | 2:28.60 | |
| 6 | Kristen Caverly | USA | 2:28.60 | |
| 8 | Suzaan van Biljon | South Africa | 2:29.44 | |
