= 2003 European Short Course Swimming Championships =

Water sport competitions

- Host city: Blanchardstown, Fingal
- Date: 11–14 December 2003
- Venue: National Aquatic Centre

The 2003 European Short Course Swimming Championships were held at the National Aquatic Centre in Blanchardstown, Fingal between 11 and 14 December.

== Medal table ==
* Host nation (Ireland)

Rank	Nation	Gold	Silver	Bronze	Total
1	Germany (GER)	7	6	8	21
2	Great Britain (GBR)	7	6	1	14
3	Netherlands (NED)	5	1	2	8
4	Slovenia (SLO)	3	1	1	5
5	Hungary (HUN)	3	0	1	4
6	Sweden (SWE)	2	5	0	7
7	Russia (RUS)	2	3	2	7
8	France (FRA)	2	0	2	4
9	Finland (FIN)	2	0	1	3
10	Italy (ITA)	1	3	3	7
11	Ukraine (UKR)	1	2	4	7
12	Czech Republic (CZE)	1	2	1	4
13	Serbia and Montenegro (SCG)	1	1	0	2
13	Slovakia (SVK)	1	1	0	2
15	Austria (AUT)	1	0	3	4
16	Spain (ESP)	1	0	1	2
17	Belarus (BLR)	0	1	3	4
18	Switzerland (SUI)	0	1	1	2
19	Croatia (CRO)	0	1	0	1
19	Iceland (ISL)	0	1	0	1
19	Ireland (IRL)*	0	1	0	1
22	Denmark (DEN)	0	0	2	2
22	Poland (POL)	0	0	2	2
24	Lithuania (LTU)	0	0	1	1
Totals (24 entries)		40	36	39	115

== Men's events ==
=== Final 50 m freestyle ===
Rank	Name	Nationality	Time
1st place, gold medalist(s)	Mark Foster	GBR	21.42
2nd place, silver medalist(s)	Milorad Čavić	SCG	21.49 NR
3rd place, bronze medalist(s)	Bartosz Kizierowski	POL	21.54
4	Stefan Nystrand	SWE	21.57
5	Julien Sicot	FRA	21.82
6	Carsten Dehmlow	GER	21.88
7	Johan Kenkhuis	NED	21.89
8	Mark Veens	NED	21.98

=== Final 100 m freestyle ===
Rank	Name	Nationality	Time
1st place, gold medalist(s)	Pieter van den Hoogenband	NED	46.81
2nd place, silver medalist(s)	Filippo Magnini	ITA	47.32
3rd place, bronze medalist(s)	Christian Galenda	ITA	47.77
4	Andrey Kapralov	RUS	47.85
5	Yuri Yegoshin	UKR	47.95
6	Denis Pimankov	RUS	48.07
7	Bartosz Kizierowski	POL	48.25
8	Attila Zubor	HUN	48.46

=== Final 200 m freestyle ===
Rank	Name	Nationality	Time
1st place, gold medalist(s)	Pieter van den Hoogenband	NED	1:41.89
2nd place, silver medalist(s)	Květoslav Svoboda	CZE	1:44.56
3rd place, bronze medalist(s)	Saulius Binevičius	LTU	1:45.09
4	Stefan Herbst	GER	1:45.16
5	Yuri Prilukov	RUS	1:45.18
6	Simon Burnett	GBR	1:45.24
7	Romāns Miloslavskis	LAT	1:45.38
8	Filippo Magnini	ITA	1:45.58

=== Final 400 m freestyle ===
Rank	Name	Nationality	Time
1st place, gold medalist(s)	Yuri Prilukov	RUS	3:40.19
1st place, gold medalist(s)	Massimiliano Rosolino	ITA	3:40.19
3rd place, bronze medalist(s)	Květoslav Svoboda	CZE	3:42.34
4	Sergey Fesenko	UKR	3:43.98
5	Adam Faulkner	GBR	3:44.76
6	Dimitrios Manganas	GRE	3:44.79
7	Nikolaos Xylouris	GRE	3:46.06
8	Guy Noël Schmitt	FRA	3:46.80

=== Final 1500 m freestyle ===
Rank	Name	Nationality	Time
1st place, gold medalist(s)	Yuri Prilukov	RUS	14:31.82
2nd place, silver medalist(s)	Graeme Smith	GBR	14:42.64
3rd place, bronze medalist(s)	Massimiliano Rosolino	ITA	14:47.34
4	Thomas Lurz	GER	14:47,54
5	Guy Noël Schmitt	FRA	14:50.70
6	Bojan Zdešar	SLO	14:51.86
7	Christian Hein	GER	14:53.63
8	Christian Minotti	ITA	14:55.98

=== Final 50 m backstroke ===
Rank	Name	Nationality	Time
1st place, gold medalist(s)	Thomas Rupprath	GER	23.71
2nd place, silver medalist(s)	Vyacheslav Shyrshov	UKR	24.16
3rd place, bronze medalist(s)	Toni Helbig	GER	24.19
4	Ante Mašković	CRO	24.25
5	Darius Grigalionis	(Lithuania) LIT	24.31
6	Arkady Vyatchanin	RUS	24.41
7	Örn Arnarson	ISL	24.47
8	Gregor Tait	GBR	24.52

=== Final 100 m backstroke ===
Rank	Name	Nationality	Time
1st place, gold medalist(s)	Thomas Rupprath	GER	50.72
2nd place, silver medalist(s)	Örn Arnarson	ISL	51.74 NR
3rd place, bronze medalist(s)	Steffen Driesen	GER	51.92
4	Arkady Vyatchanin	RUS	52.00
5	Markus Rogan	AUT	52.39
5	László Cseh	HUN	52.39
7	Gregor Tait	GBR	52.47
8	Darius Grigalionis	LTU	52.58

=== Final 200 m backstroke ===
Rank	Name	Nationality	Time
1st place, gold medalist(s)	Blaž Medvešek	SLO	1:52.60
2nd place, silver medalist(s)	Steffen Driesen	GER	1:53.07
3rd place, bronze medalist(s)	Markus Rogan	AUT	1:53.08
4	Arkady Vyatchanin	RUS	1:53.17
5	Örn Arnarson	ISL	1:53.40
6	László Cseh	HUN	1:53.42
7	Yevgeni Alechin	RUS	1:53.87
8	Răzvan Florea	ROM	1:54.06

=== Final 50 m breaststroke ===
Rank	Name	Nationality	Time
1st place, gold medalist(s)	Oleg Lisogor	UKR	26.89
2nd place, silver medalist(s)	Remo Lütolf	SUI	27.02
3rd place, bronze medalist(s)	Mark Warnecke	GER	27.03
4	Darren Mew	GBR	27.04
5	Chris Cook	GBR	27.07
6	Stefan Nystrand	SWE	27.14
7	Matjaž Markič	SLO	27.36
8	Alessandro Terrin	ITA	27.47

=== Final 100 m breaststroke ===
Rank	Name	Nationality	Time
1st place, gold medalist(s)	James Gibson	GBR	58.03
2nd place, silver medalist(s)	Oleg Lisogor	UKR	58.42
3rd place, bronze medalist(s)	Darren Mew	GBR	58.78
4	Martin Gustavsson	SWE	59.08
5	Jens Kruppa	GER	59.71
6	Emil Tahirovič	SLO	59.75
7	Dimitri Komornikov	RUS	59.78
8	Hugues Duboscq	FRA	59.83

=== Final 200 m breaststroke ===
Rank	Name	Nationality	Time
1st place, gold medalist(s)	Ian Edmond	GBR	2:05.63
2nd place, silver medalist(s)	Andrew Bree	IRL	2:08.02
3rd place, bronze medalist(s)	Thijs van Valkengoed	NED	2:08.30
4	James Gibson	GBR	2:08.38
5	Andrei Ivanov	RUS	2:08.50
6	Dmitry Komornikov	RUS	2:08.61
7	Mihail Alexandrov	BUL	2:09.37
8	Hugues Duboscq	FRA	2:09.83

=== Final 50 m butterfly ===
Rank	Name	Nationality	Time
1st place, gold medalist(s)	Mark Foster	GBR	23.22
2nd place, silver medalist(s)	Alexei Puninski	CRO	23.40
3rd place, bronze medalist(s)	Andriy Serdinov	UKR	23.44
4	Todd Cooper	GBR	23.49
5	Fabian Friedrich	GER	23.50
6	Nikolay Skvortsov	RUS	23.62
7	Joris Keizer	NED	23.66
8	Jere Hård	FIN	23.67

=== Final 100 m butterfly ===
Rank	Name	Nationality	Time
1st place, gold medalist(s)	Milorad Čavić	SCG	50.02 WR
2nd place, silver medalist(s)	Thomas Rupprath	GER	50.43
3rd place, bronze medalist(s)	Andriy Serdinov	UKR	50.88
4	Nikolay Skvortsov	RUS	51.22
5	Joris Keizer	NED	52.03
6	Yevgeni Korotychkine	RUS	52.05
7	Mattia Nalesso	ITA	52.22
8	Todd Cooper	GBR	52.44

=== Final 200 m butterfly ===
Rank	Name	Nationality	Time
1st place, gold medalist(s)	Franck Esposito	FRA	1:51.98
2nd place, silver medalist(s)	Stephen Parry	GBR	1:53.01
3rd place, bronze medalist(s)	Paweł Korzeniowski	POL	1:53.68
4	Nikolay Skvortsov	RUS	1:53.72
5	Ioan Gherghel	ROM	1:54.08
6	Anatoly Polyakov	RUS	1:54.19
7	Tero Välimaa	FIN	1:55.17
8	Sergiy Advena	UKR	1:56.55

=== Final 100 m individual medley ===
Rank	Name	Nationality	Time
1st place, gold medalist(s)	Peter Mankoč	SLO	53.35
1st place, gold medalist(s)	Jani Sievinen	FIN	53.35
3rd place, bronze medalist(s)	Marco di Carli	GER	54.06
4	Dzianis Silkou	BLR	54.39
5	Alexey Zatsepin	RUS	54.99
5	Brenton Cabello	ESP	54.99
7	Jakob Andersen	DEN	55.11
8	Alexander Hetland	NOR	55.17

=== Final 200 m individual medley ===
Rank	Name	Nationality	Time
1st place, gold medalist(s)	Jani Sievinen	FIN	1:55.40
2nd place, silver medalist(s)	Massimiliano Rosolino	ITA	1:56.70
3rd place, bronze medalist(s)	Peter Mankoč	SLO	1:57.03
4	Christian Keller	GER	1:57.65
5	Tamás Kerékjártó	HUN	1:57.68
6	Krešimir Čač	CRO	1:57.74
7	Alessio Boggiatto	ITA	1:58.13
8	Andrew Bree	IRL	2:03.06

=== Final 400 m individual medley ===
Rank	Name	Nationality	Time
1st place, gold medalist(s)	László Cseh	HUN	4:04.10
2nd place, silver medalist(s)	Robin Francis	GBR	4:05.20
3rd place, bronze medalist(s)	Massimiliano Rosolino	ITA	4:06.59
4	Alessio Boggiatto	ITA	4:07.50
5	Igor Beretsutskiy	RUS	4:08.20
6	Alexei Kovrichin	RUS	4:09.20
7	Tamás Kerékjártó	HUN	4:09.63
8	Lukasz Wojt	POL	4:11.15

=== Final 4 × 50 m freestyle relay ===
Rank	Name	Nationality	Time
1st place, gold medalist(s)	Mark Veens; Johan Kenkhuis; Gijs Damen; Pieter van den Hoogenband	NED	1:25.55
2nd place, silver medalist(s)	Carsten Dehmlow; Benjamin Friedrich; Fabian Friedrich; Jens Schreiber	GER	1:26.26
3rd place, bronze medalist(s)	Vyacheslav Shyrshov; Yuri Yegoshin; Oleg Lisogor; Oleksandr Volynets	UKR	1.26,30
4	David Nordenlilja; Stefan Nystrand; Marcus Piehl; Erik Dorch	SWE	1:26.40
5	Chris Cozens; Matthew Kidd; Alexander Scotcher; Mark Foster	GBR	1:26.42
6	Denis Pimankov; Andrey Kapralov; Dmitry Talepov; Ivan Usov	RUS	1:26.45
7	Jani Sievinen; Jere Hård; Matti Rajakylä; Manu Mantymaki	FIN	1:26.68
8	Julien Sicot; Romain Barnier; Alain Bernard; David Maitre	FRA	1:27.09

=== Final 4 × 50 m medley relay ===
Rank	Name	Nationality	Time
1st place, gold medalist(s)	Thomas Rupprath; Mark Warnecke; Fabian Friedrich; Carsten Dehmlow	GER	1:34.46
2nd place, silver medalist(s)	Jens Petersson; Martin Gustavsson; Björn Lundin; Stefan Nystrand	SWE	1:36.28
3rd place, bronze medalist(s)	Flori Lang; Remo Lütolf; Lorenz Liechti; Karel Novy	SUI	1:36.65
4	Mitja Zastrow; Thijs van Valkengoed; Joris Keizer; Pieter van den Hoogenband	NED	1:37.06
5	Tero Raty; Jani Sievinen; Jere Hård; Manu Mantymaki	FIN	1:37.10
6	Ante Mašković; Vanja Rogulj; Alexei Puninski; Aleš Volčanšek	CRO	1:37.14
7	Matthew Clay; Darren Mew; Mark Foster; Chris Cozens	GBR	1:37.27
8	Petter Sjödal; Morten Nystram; Alexander Hetland; Alexander Dale Oen	NOR	1:37.92

== Women's events ==
=== Final 50 m freestyle ===
Rank	Name	Nationality	Time
1st place, gold medalist(s)	Marleen Veldhuis	NED	24.39
2nd place, silver medalist(s)	Alison Sheppard	GBR	24.48
3rd place, bronze medalist(s)	Malia Metella	FRA	24.54
4	Sandra Völker	(Germany) SWE	24.60
5	Hanna-Maria Seppälä	FIN	24.79
6	Judith Draxler	AUT	24.81
7	Hinkelien Schreuder	NED	24.92
8	Nery-Mantey Niangkoura	GRE	24.97

=== Final 100 m freestyle ===
Rank	Name	Nationality	Time
1st place, gold medalist(s)	Malia Metella	FRA	53.15
2nd place, silver medalist(s)	Marleen Veldhuis	NED	53.42
3rd place, bronze medalist(s)	Hanna-Maria Seppälä	FIN	53.46
4	Josefin Lillhage	SWE	53.62
5	Alena Popchanka	BLR	53.67
6	Johanna Sjöberg	SWE	53.79
7	Sandra Völker	GER	53.80
8	Jana Mysková	CZE	54.16

=== Final 200 m freestyle ===
Rank	Name	Nationality	Time
1st place, gold medalist(s)	Melanie Marshall	GBR	1:55.10
2nd place, silver medalist(s)	Josefin Lillhage	SWE	1:55.57
3rd place, bronze medalist(s)	Alena Popchanka	BLR	1:55.66
4	Britta Steffen	GER	1:56.59
5	Alessa Ries	GER	1:57.05
6	Marleen Veldhuis	NED	1:57.11
7	Jana Mysková	CZE	1:57.84
8	Paulina Barzycka	POL	1:57.99

=== Final 400 m freestyle ===
Rank	Name	Nationality	Time
1st place, gold medalist(s)	Joanne Jackson	GBR	4:04.00
2nd place, silver medalist(s)	Rebecca Cooke	GBR	4:04.80
3rd place, bronze medalist(s)	Melissa Caballero	ESP	4:05.00
3rd place, bronze medalist(s)	Regina Sytch	RUS	4:05.00
5	Éva Risztov	HUN	4:05.13
6	Josefin Lillhage	SWE	4:07.68
7	Daria Parchina	RUS	4:08.09
8	Alessa Ries	GER	4:08.92

=== Final 800 m freestyle ===
Rank	Name	Nationality	Time
1st place, gold medalist(s)	Erika Villaecija	ESP	8:18.65
2nd place, silver medalist(s)	Rebecca Cooke	GBR	8:22.05
3rd place, bronze medalist(s)	Éva Risztov	HUN	8:23.94
4	Melissa Caballero	ESP	8:25.04
5	Regina Sytch	RUS	8:26.36
6	Hannah Stockbauer	GER	8:28.93
7	Polina Schornikova	RUS	8:37.73
8	Angelika Oleksy	POL	8:38.02

=== Final 50 m backstroke ===
Rank	Name	Nationality	Time
1st place, gold medalist(s)	Ilona Hlaváčková	CZE	27.48
2nd place, silver medalist(s)	Antje Buschschulte	GER	27.54
3rd place, bronze medalist(s)	Louise Ørnstedt	DEN	27.56
4	Janine Pietsch	GER	27.76
5	Sanja Jovanović	CRO	27.99
6	Sarah Price	GBR	28.38
7	Alessandra Cappa	ITA	28.55
8	Carla Stampfli	SUI	28.68

=== Final 100 m backstroke ===
Rank	Name	Nationality	Time
1st place, gold medalist(s)	Antje Buschschulte	GER	58.40
2nd place, silver medalist(s)	Ilona Hlaváčková	CZE	58.72
3rd place, bronze medalist(s)	Laure Manaudou	FRA	58.99
4	Sarah Price	GBR	59.19
5	Stanislava Komarova	RUS	59.23
6	Louise Ørnstedt	DEN	59.24
7	Iryna Amshennikova	UKR	59.28
8	Janine Pietsch	GER	59.45

=== Final 200 m backstroke ===
Rank	Name	Nationality	Time
1st place, gold medalist(s)	Antje Buschschulte	GER	2:04.23
2nd place, silver medalist(s)	Stanislava Komarova	RUS	2:05.42
3rd place, bronze medalist(s)	Iryna Amshennikova	UKR	2:06.51
4	Sarah Price	GBR	2:06.95
5	Alenka Kejžar	SLO	2:08.01
6	Annika Liebs	GER	2:09.16
7	Nikolett Szepesi	HUN	2:09.62
8	Esther Baron	FRA	2:10.51

=== Final 50 m breaststroke ===
Rank	Name	Nationality	Time
1st place, gold medalist(s)	Sarah Poewe	GER	30.40
2nd place, silver medalist(s)	Emma Igelström	SWE	30.59
3rd place, bronze medalist(s)	Yelena Bogonazova	RUS	30.99
4	Kerstin Vogel	GER	31.07
5	Moniek Nijhuis	NED	31.28
6	Rachel Genner	GBR	31.29
7	Majken Thorup	DEN	31.44
8	Jane Trepp	EST	31.45

=== Final 100 m breaststroke ===
Rank	Name	Nationality	Time
1st place, gold medalist(s)	Sarah Poewe	GER	1:06.31
2nd place, silver medalist(s)	Elena Bogonazova	RUS	1:06.63
3rd place, bronze medalist(s)	Mirna Jukić	AUT	1:06.68
4	Emma Igelström	SWE	1:06.72
5	Rachel Genner	GBR	1:07.14
6	Simone Weiler	GER	1:07.33
7	Majken Thorup	DEN	1:07.56
8	Kirsty Balfour	GBR	1:07.61

=== Final 200 m breaststroke ===
Rank	Name	Nationality	Time
1st place, gold medalist(s)	Mirna Jukić	AUT	2:21.09
2nd place, silver medalist(s)	Anne Poleska	GER	2:21.93
3rd place, bronze medalist(s)	Simone Weiler	GER	2:22.64
4	Kirsty Balfour	GBR	2:24.03
5	Natalia Hissamutdinova	EST	2:25.54
6	Smiljana Marinović	CRO	2:26.66
7	Chiara Boggiatto	ITA	2:27.29
8	Diana Remenyi	HUN	2:27.31

=== Final 50 m butterfly ===
Rank	Name	Nationality	Time
1st place, gold medalist(s)	Anna-Karin Kammerling	SWE	25.91
2nd place, silver medalist(s)	Martina Moravcová	SVK	26.25
3rd place, bronze medalist(s)	Fabienne Nadarajah	AUT	26.44
4	Jeanette Ottesen	DEN	26.57
5	Hinkelien Schreuder	NED	26.62
6	Chantal Groot	NED	26.69
7	Johanna Sjöberg	SWE	26.73
8	Tine Bossuyt	BEL	26.93

=== Final 100 m butterfly ===
Rank	Name	Nationality	Time
1st place, gold medalist(s)	Martina Moravcová	SVK	57.25
2nd place, silver medalist(s)	Johanna Sjöberg	SWE	58.23
3rd place, bronze medalist(s)	Alena Popchanka	BLR	58.26
4	Malia Metella	FRA	58.42
5	Otylia Jędrzejczak	POL	58.75
6	Chantal Groot	NED	59.28
7	Aleksandra Urbanczyk	POL	59.34
8	Inge Dekker	NED	59.50

=== Final 200 m butterfly ===
Rank	Name	Nationality	Time
1st place, gold medalist(s)	Éva Risztov	HUN	2:06.72
2nd place, silver medalist(s)	Francesca Segat	ITA	2:07.12
3rd place, bronze medalist(s)	Mette Jacobsen	DEN	2:07.55
4	Otylia Jędrzejczak	POL	2:07.81
5	Paola Cavallino	ITA	2:08.63
6	María Peláez	ESP	2:09.41
7	Beatrix Boulsevicz	HUN	2:10.31
8	Roser Vives	ESP	2:10.42

=== Final 100 m individual medley ===
Rank	Name	Nationality	Time
1st place, gold medalist(s)	Alison Sheppard	GBR	1:01.19
2nd place, silver medalist(s)	Alenka Kejžar	SLO	1:01.29
3rd place, bronze medalist(s)	Hanna Shcherba	BLR	1:01.40
4	Sara Parise	ITA	1:01.61
5	Hanna Eriksson	SWE	1:02.03
6	Tatiana Rouba	ESP	1:02.57
7	Jane Trepp	EST	1:02.90
8	Julie Hjørt-Hansen	DEN	1:03.00

=== Final 200 m individual medley ===
Rank	Name	Nationality	Time
1st place, gold medalist(s)	Alenka Kejžar	SLO	2:09.32
2nd place, silver medalist(s)	Hanna Shcherba	BLR	2:11.00
3rd place, bronze medalist(s)	Teresa Rohmann	GER	2:11.44
4	Aleksandra Urbanczyk	POL	2:11.56
5	Julie Hjørt-Hansen	DEN	2:11.76
6	Anja Klinar	SLO	2:12.76
7	Yana Tolkacheva	RUS	2:13.46
8	Tatiana Rouba	ESP	2:14.41

=== Final 400 m individual medley ===
Rank	Name	Nationality	Time
1st place, gold medalist(s)	Éva Risztov	HUN	4:33.57
2nd place, silver medalist(s)	Yana Tolkatcheva	RUS	4:35.28
3rd place, bronze medalist(s)	Teresa Rohmann	GER	4:35.47
4	Anja Klinar	SLO	4:35.81
5	Vasiliki Angelopoulou	GRE	4:41.30
6	Rebecca Cooke	GBR	4:42.45
7	Mirjana Boševska	MKD	4:42.67
8	Roser Vives	ESP	4:42.92

=== Final 4 × 50 m freestyle relay ===
Rank	Name	Nationality	Time
1st place, gold medalist(s)	Hinkelien Schreuder; Annabel Kosten; Chantal Groot; Marleen Veldhuis	NED	1:37.52
2nd place, silver medalist(s)	Claire Hedenskog; Anna-Karin Kammerling; Johanna Sjöberg; Josefin Lillhage	SWE	1:37.68
3rd place, bronze medalist(s)	Katrin Meissner; Sandra Völker; Petra Dallmann; Britta Steffen	GER	1:38.68

=== Final 4 × 50 m medley relay ===
Rank	Name	Nationality	Time
1st place, gold medalist(s)	Emelie Kierkegaard; Emma Igelström; Johanna Sjöberg; Josefin Lillhage	SWE	1:48.79
2nd place, silver medalist(s)	Antje Buschschulte; Sarah Poewe; Janine Pietsch; Sandra Völker	GER	1:48.85
3rd place, bronze medalist(s)	Hinkelien Schreuder; Moniek Nijhuis; Chantal Groot; Marleen Veldhuis	NED	1:49.10
