= Swimming at the 2000 Summer Olympics – Women's 100 metre breaststroke =

Women's 100 metre breaststroke at the Games of the XXVII Olympiad
- Venue: Sydney International Aquatic Centre
- Date: 17 September 2000 (heats & semifinals); 18 September 2000 (final)
- Competitors: 44 from 37 nations
- Winning time: 1:07.05 AM

Medalists
1st place, gold medalist(s)		Megan Quann	United States
2nd place, silver medalist(s)		Leisel Jones	Australia
3rd place, bronze medalist(s)		Penny Heyns	South Africa

The women's 100 metre breaststroke event at the 2000 Summer Olympics took place on 17–18 September at the Sydney International Aquatic Centre in Sydney, Australia.

At only 16 years of age, U.S. swimmer Megan Quann fulfilled her merciless prediction by knocking off South Africa's defending Olympic champion Penny Heyns in the event. Coming from third at the final turn, she surged powerfully past the champion over the last 25 metres to snatch the gold medal in a new American record of 1:07.05, just a small fraction closer to an Olympic standard. Spurred on by the home crowd, 15 year-old Leisel Jones roared back from fifth place on the final stretch to take home the silver in 1:07.49. Heyns, who was struggling with her form in the prelims and semifinals, seized off a strong lead under a world-record pace (31.10), but ended up only with a bronze in a time of 1:07.55. Meanwhile, Sarah Poewe, the fastest qualifier for the final, trailed behind her teammate by three-tenths of a second in 1:07.85.

Outside the 1:08-club, Hungary's Ágnes Kovács finished fifth in 1:08.09, and was followed in sixth by Japan's Masami Tanaka with a time of 1:08.37. Aussie favorite Tarnee White (1:09.09) and 31-year-old Sylvia Gerasch (1:09.86), a product of the old East German system, closed out the field.

Notable swimmers missed out the top 8 final, featuring Quann's teammate Staciana Stitts, who had a poor start on the morning prelims with an eighteenth-place effort; and Angola's Nádia Cruz, the first for her nation to compete in all four editions of the Games since 1988.

== Records ==
Prior to this competition, the existing world and Olympic records were as follows.

World record	Penny Heyns (RSA)	1:06.52	Sydney, Australia	23 August 1999
Olympic record	Penny Heyns (RSA)	1:07.02	Atlanta, United States	21 July 1996

== Results ==
=== Heats ===
Rank	Heat	Lane	Name	Nationality	Time	Notes
1	5	4	Megan Quann	United States	1:07.48	Q
2	6	4	Penny Heyns	South Africa	1:07.85	Q
3	6	3	Leisel Jones	Australia	1:07.92	Q
4	4	5	Sarah Poewe	South Africa	1:08.06	Q
5	4	3	Tarnee White	Australia	1:08.35	Q
6	5	5	Ágnes Kovács	Hungary	1:08.50	Q
7	4	4	Masami Tanaka	Japan	1:09.12	Q
8	6	6	Sylvia Gerasch	Germany	1:09.31	Q
9	4	2	Brigitte Becue	Belgium	1:09.38	Q
10	4	7	Christin Petelski	Canada	1:09.57	Q
11	5	3	Svitlana Bondarenko	Ukraine	1:09.60	Q
12	6	2	Rhiannon Leier	Canada	1:09.68	Q
13	5	6	Qi Hui	China	1:09.88	Q
14	6	7	Simone Karn	Germany	1:09.94	Q
15	5	8	Nataša Kejžar	Slovenia	1:10.44	Q, NR
16	6	8	Madelon Baans	Netherlands	1:10.47	Q
17	5	1	Olga Bakaldina	Russia	1:10.53	
18	6	5	Staciana Stitts	United States	1:10.54	
19	4	6	Li Wei	China	1:10.55	
20	5	7	Heidi Earp	Great Britain	1:10.56	
21	5	2	Alicja Pęczak	Poland	1:10.57	
22	6	1	Emma Igelström	Sweden	1:11.09	
23	2	6	İlkay Dikmen	Turkey	1:11.51	NR
24	3	4	Elvira Fischer	Austria	1:11.58	
25	4	8	Byun Hye-young	South Korea	1:11.64	
26	3	1	Isabel Ceballos	Colombia	1:11.90	NR
27	3	7	Agata Czaplicki	Switzerland	1:13.19	
28	3	5	Joscelin Yeo	Singapore	1:13.25	
29	3	3	Emma Robinson	Ireland	1:13.41	
30	3	2	Smiljana Marinović	Croatia	1:13.49	
31	3	6	Imaday Nuñez Gonzalez	Cuba	1:13.91	
32	2	4	Siow Yi Ting	Malaysia	1:13.92	
33	2	3	Íris Edda Heimisdóttir	Iceland	1:14.07	
34	2	5	Olga Moltchanova	Kyrgyzstan	1:14.41	
35	3	8	Jenny Rose Guerrero	Philippines	1:15.14	
36	2	2	Caroline Chiu Sin Wing	Hong Kong	1:15.87	
37	2	1	Katerine Moreno	Bolivia	1:16.15	NR
38	2	7	Nádia Cruz	Angola	1:19.57	
39	2	8	Xenia Peni	Papua New Guinea	1:19.62	
40	1	3	Mariam Pauline Keita	Mali	1:37.80	
41	1	5	Balkissa Ouhoumoudou	Niger	1:42.39	
	1	4	Doli Akhter	Bangladesh	DSQ	
	1	6	Pamela Girimbabazi	Rwanda	DSQ	
	4	1	Junko Isoda	Japan	DNS	

=== Semifinals ===
==== Semifinal 1 ====
Rank	Lane	Name	Nationality	Time	Notes
1	5	Sarah Poewe	South Africa	1:07.48	Q
2	3	Ágnes Kovács	Hungary	1:07.79	Q, NR
3	4	Penny Heyns	South Africa	1:08.33	Q
4	6	Sylvia Gerasch	Germany	1:09.33	Q
5	2	Christin Petelski	Canada	1:09.54	
6	7	Rhiannon Leier	Canada	1:09.63	
7	1	Simone Karn	Germany	1:09.85	
8	8	Madelon Baans	Netherlands	1:10.44	

==== Semifinal 2 ====
Rank	Lane	Name	Nationality	Time	Notes
1	4	Megan Quann	United States	1:07.79	Q
2	5	Leisel Jones	Australia	1:08.03	Q
3	3	Tarnee White	Australia	1:08.61	Q
4	6	Masami Tanaka	Japan	1:09.04	Q
5	2	Brigitte Becue	Belgium	1:09.47	
6	1	Qi Hui	China	1:09.81	
7	7	Svitlana Bondarenko	Ukraine	1:09.84	
8	8	Nataša Kejžar	Slovenia	1:10.66	

=== Final ===
Rank	Lane	Name	Nationality	Time	Notes
1st place, gold medalist(s)	5	Megan Quann	United States	1:07.05	AM
2nd place, silver medalist(s)	6	Leisel Jones	Australia	1:07.49	OC
3rd place, bronze medalist(s)	2	Penny Heyns	South Africa	1:07.55	
4	4	Sarah Poewe	South Africa	1:07.85	
5	3	Ágnes Kovács	Hungary	1:08.09	
6	1	Masami Tanaka	Japan	1:08.37	
7	7	Tarnee White	Australia	1:09.09	
8	8	Sylvia Gerasch	Germany	1:09.86	
