= Swimming at the 2002 Commonwealth Games – Women's 100 metre breaststroke =

Women's 100 metre breaststroke at the 2002 Commonwealth Games
- Venue: Manchester Aquatics Centre
- Dates: 2–3 August 2002
- Competitors: 19 from 12 nations
- Winning time: 1:08.74

Medalists
gold medal	Leisel Jones	Australia
silver medal	Brooke Hanson	Australia
bronze medal	Sarah Poewe	South Africa

The women's 100 metre breaststroke event at the 2002 Commonwealth Games as part of the swimming programme took place on 2 and 3 August at the Manchester Aquatics Centre in Manchester, England.

== Records ==
Prior to this competition, the existing world, Commonwealth and Commonwealth Games records were as follows.

World record	Penelope Heyns (RSA)	1:06.52	Sydney, Australia	23 August 1999
Commonwealth record	Penelope Heyns (RSA)	1:06.52	Sydney, Australia	23 August 1999
Games record	Samantha Riley (AUS)	1:08.02	Victoria, Canada	22 August 1994

== Results ==
=== Heats ===
Heats were held on 2 August.

Rank	Heat	Lane	Name	Nationality	Time	Notes
1	2	5	Rhiannon Leier	Canada	1:09.46	Q
2	1	4	Tarnee White	Australia	1:09.82	Q
3	3	5	Brooke Hanson	Australia	1:09.93	Q
4	3	4	Leisel Jones	Australia	1:09.94	Q
5	2	4	Sarah Poewe	South Africa	1:10.60	Q
6	1	3	Jaime King	England	1:10.78	Q
7	1	5	Kirsty Balfour	Scotland	1:10.87	Q
8	3	3	Heidi Earp	England	1:11.28	Q
9	2	3	Kate Haywood	England	1:11.44	Q
10	3	6	Christin Petelski	Canada	1:11.95	Q
11	1	6	Emma Robinson	Northern Ireland	1:12.58	Q
12	2	6	Annamay Pierse	Canada	1:13.72	Q
13	2	2	Siow Yi Ting	Malaysia	1:14.08	Q
14	1	2	Lowri Tynan	Wales	1:14.35	Q
15	3	2	Georgia Holderness	Wales	1:14.36	Q
16	3	7	Natalie Bree	Jersey	1:15.96	Q
17	1	7	Rachel Ah Koy	Fiji	1:17.33	
18	2	1	Gail Strobridge	Guernsey	1:18.89	
19	1	1	Keren Visser	Malawi	1:26.51	

=== Semifinals ===
The semifinals were held on 2 August.

Rank	Heat	Lane	Name	Nationality	Time	Notes
1	1	5	Leisel Jones	Australia	1:08.31	Q
2	2	5	Brooke Hanson	Australia	1:09.00	Q
3	1	4	Tarnee White	Australia	1:09.19	Q
4	2	4	Rhiannon Leier	Canada	1:09.75	Q
5	2	3	Sarah Poewe	South Africa	1:09.95	Q
6	2	2	Kate Haywood	England	1:10.44	Q
7	2	6	Kirsty Balfour	Scotland	1:10.68	Q
8	1	3	Jaime King	England	1:10.92	Q
9	1	2	Christin Petelski	Canada	1:11.06	
10	1	6	Heidi Earp	England	1:11.27	
11	1	7	Annamay Pierse	Canada	1:11.99	
12	2	7	Emma Robinson	Northern Ireland	1:12.23	
13	2	1	Siow Yi Ting	Malaysia	1:13.65	
14	2	8	Georgia Holderness	Wales	1:13.80	
15	1	1	Lowri Tynan	Wales	1:13.90	
16	1	8	Natalie Bree	Jersey	1:15.23	

=== Final ===
The final was held on 3 August.

Rank	Lane	Name	Nationality	Time	Notes
1st place, gold medalist(s)	4	Leisel Jones	Australia	1:08.74	
2nd place, silver medalist(s)	5	Brooke Hanson	Australia	1:09.10	
3rd place, bronze medalist(s)	2	Sarah Poewe	South Africa	1:09.29	
4	3	Tarnee White	Australia	1:09.63	
5	6	Rhiannon Leier	Canada	1:09.92	
6	7	Kate Haywood	England	1:10.20	
7	1	Kirsty Balfour	Scotland	1:10.61	
8	8	Jaime King	England	1:11.45	
