= Emma Robinson (Irish swimmer) =

Irish swimmer (born 1978)

Personal information
- Full name: Emma Kathryne Robinson
- National team: Ireland
- Born: 16 August 1978 (age 47) Ballymoney, Northern Ireland, United Kingdom
- Height: 1.80 m (5 ft 11 in)
- Weight: 66 kg (146 lb)

Sport
- Sport: Swimming
- Strokes: Breaststroke
- College team: Loughborough University (GBR)
- Coach: Paul Dennis

Emma Kathryne Robinson (born 16 August 1978) is an Irish former swimmer, who specialized in breaststroke events. She is a former Irish record holder in the 100 m breaststroke and a member of the swimming team at Loughborough University, under her personal coach Paul Dennis.

Robinson made her first Irish team at the 2000 Summer Olympics in Sydney, where she competed in the women's 100 m breaststroke. She edged out Croatia's Smiljana Marinović to take a fifth spot and twenty-ninth overall in heat three by 0.08 of a second in 1:13.41.

At the 2004 Summer Olympics in Athens, Robinson qualified again for the women's 100 m breaststroke by posting a FINA A-cut of 1:09.64 from the British Olympic trials in Sheffield. She challenged seven other swimmers on the sixth heat, including defending Olympic silver medalist Leisel Jones of Australia. She rounded out the field to last place by a hundredth of a second (0.01) behind Finland's Eeva Saarinen in 1:11.40. Robinson failed to advance into the semifinals, as she matched a twenty-fourth place tie with Portugal's Diana Gomes in the preliminaries.
