= Yip Tsz-wa =

Hong Kong swimmer (born 1990)

Yip Tsz-wa OLY
Personal information
- Full name: Yvonne Yip Tsz-wa
- National team: Hong Kong
- Born: 22 October 1990 (age 35) Hong Kong, Hong Kong
- Height: 1.57 m (5 ft 2 in)
- Weight: 47 kg (104 lb)

Sport
- Sport: Swimming
- Strokes: Breaststroke
- Club: DL Trading Limited

Yvonne Yip Tsz-wa (also Yip Tsz-wa, Chinese: 葉芷華; pinyin: Yè Zhǐhuá; Jyutping: jip^{6} zi^{2}waa^{4}; born October 22, 1990) is a Hong Kong swimmer, who specialized in breaststroke events. Yip qualified for the women's 100 m breaststroke, as Hong Kong's youngest ever swimmer (aged 13), at the 2004 Summer Olympics in Athens. She set a new Hong Kong record and posted a FINA B-standard entry time of 1:13.02 from the Asian Age Group Championships in her home venue. She challenged seven other swimmers in heat two, including 15-year-old Alia Atkinson, who later became Jamaica's top swimmer. She edged out Iceland's Íris Edda Heimisdóttir to claim a seventh spot by 0.82 of a second, outside her record time of 1:14.53. Yip failed to advance into the semifinals, as she placed thirty-ninth overall in the preliminaries.
