= Balkissa Ouhoumoudou =

Nigerien swimmer (born 1983)

Personal information
- Born: 8 July 1983 (age 43)

Sport
- Sport: Swimming
- Strokes: Breaststroke

Balkissa Ouhoumoudou (born 8 July 1983) is a Nigerien former swimmer, who specialized in breaststroke events. Ouhoumoudou competed only in the women's 100 m breaststroke at the 2000 Summer Olympics in Sydney. She received a ticket from FINA, under a Universality program, without meeting an entry time. She participated in heat one against three other swimmers Mariam Pauline Keita of Mali, 14-year-old Doli Akhter of Bangladesh, and Pamela Girimbabazi of Rwanda. With one swimmer casting out of the race for a no false-start rule (Akhter), and the other for an illegal turn (Girimbabazi), Ouhoumoudou raced to the second seed in a time of 1:42.39, the slowest ever in the heats. Ouhoumoudou failed to advance into the semifinals, as she placed forty-first overall in the prelims.
