= Lee Ji-young (swimmer) =

South Korean swimmer (born 1989)

Personal information
- Full name: Lee Ji-young
- National team: South Korea
- Born: 10 July 1989 (age 36) Seoul, South Korea
- Height: 1.63 m (5 ft 4 in)
- Weight: 52 kg (115 lb)

Korean name
- Hangul: 이지영
- RR: I Jiyeong
- MR: I Chiyŏng

Sport
- Sport: Swimming
- Strokes: Breaststroke
- Club: Peddie Aquatics (U.S.)

Lee Ji-young (Korean: 이지영; born July 10, 1989) is a South Korean swimmer, who specialized in breaststroke events. She became the first female South Korean in history to train in the United States, and swim for the Peddie Aquatic Association in Hightstown, New Jersey.

As one of South Korea's youngest swimmers, Lee qualified for two swimming events at the 2004 Summer Olympics in Athens, by achieving FINA A-standard entry time of 2:31.32 (200 m breaststroke) from the Dong-A Swimming Tournament in Seoul. In the 100 m breaststroke, Lee challenged seven other swimmers on the third heat, including two-time Olympian İlkay Dikmen of Turkey. She edged out New Zealand's Annabelle Carey to take a seventh spot and thirty-third overall by 0.29 of a second in 1:12.93. In her second event, 200 m breaststroke, Lee placed twenty-fourth overall on the morning's preliminaries. Swimming in the final heat of five, she rounded out a field of seven swimmers to last place in 2:34.55, more than three seconds off her entry time.
