= Samar Nassar =

Palestinian-Jordanian swimmer (born 1978)

Personal information
- Full name: Sangay Odett Nassar
- Born: 16 February 1978 (age 48) Beirut, Lebanon

Sport
- Sport: Swimming

Samar Odett Nassar (born 16 February 1978) is a Palestinian-Jordanian former swimmer and sports official. As a swimmer, she competed for Palestine at the 2000 Summer Olympics, wherein she was the first female Palestinian Olympian, and for Jordan at the 2004 Summer Olympics. As a sports official, she led Jordan's bid and hosting of the 2016 FIFA U-17 Women's World Cup.

== Biography ==
Samar Odett Nassar was born on 16 February 1978 in Beirut, Lebanon. Nassar graduated from the University of Surrey with a bachelor's degree in molecular biology and genetics and later a master's degree in sport organizational management from KU Leuven.

As a swimmer, Nassar first competed for Palestine at the 2000 Summer Olympics held in Sydney, Australia, in the women's 50 metre freestyle. She competed in the second preliminary heat against six other swimmers on 22 September. There, she recorded a time of 30.05 seconds and placed 65th overall, failing to advance further to the semifinals. With her participation, she became the first Palestinian woman to compete for the nation at any edition of an Olympic Games.

After the 2000 Summer Games, she switched her sporting nationality to represent Jordan. She competed for Jordan at the 2003 World Aquatics Championships held in Barcelona, Spain, competing in the women's 50 metre breaststroke, 50 metre freestyle, and 100 metre breaststroke. She did not make it past any of the preliminary heats of the events. She also competed for Jordan at the 2004 Summer Olympics held in Athens, Greece, in the women's 50 metre freestyle.

As a sports official, she was the chef de mission for the Jordanian delegation at the 2012 Summer Olympics. She then became active in association football, wherein Nassar was the CEO of the FIFA U-17 Women's World Cup Local Organizing Committee that handled Jordan's bid and hosting of the 2016 FIFA U-17 Women's World Cup. In 2018, the International Olympic Committee awarded her with the "Winner for Asia" title for her efforts developing women's role in sports, which included her establishment of football programs for Syrian girls living in the Zaatari refugee camp.
