= Aikaterini Sarakatsani =

Greek swimmer (born 1977)

Personal information
- Full name: Aikaterini Sarakatsani
- Nickname: Katia
- National team: Greece
- Born: 3 January 1977 (age 49) Athens, Greece
- Height: 1.73 m (5 ft 8 in)
- Weight: 63 kg (139 lb)

Sport
- Sport: Swimming
- Strokes: Breaststroke, medley
- Club: Panathinaikos (1996–2004); Ionikos Nikaias (2014–)
- College team: University of Hawaiʻi (U.S.)
- Coach: Vojko Race (SRB)

Aikaterini "Katia" Sarakatsani (Greek: Αικατερίνη Σαρακατσάνη; born 3 January 1977) is a Greek swimmer, who specialized in breaststroke and individual medley events. She is a three-time Olympian (1996, 2000, and 2004), a former Greek record holder in the breaststroke, and a member of the swimming team for Hawaiʻi Rainbow Wahine at the University of Hawaiʻi at Mānoa, under head coach Vojko Race.

Sarakatsani made her first Greek team, as a 19-year-old, at the 1996 Summer Olympics in Atlanta. She failed to reach the top 16 final in any of her individual events, finishing twenty-third in the 200 m individual medley (2:19.74), and twenty-fifth in the 400 m individual medley (4:56.32). She also placed twenty-second, as a member of the Greek team, in the 4 × 100 m medley relay (4:24.80).

At the 2000 Summer Olympics in Sydney, Sarakatsani competed only in the 200 m individual medley. Swimming in heat two, she raced to sixth place and thirtieth overall by 0.07 of a second behind Argentina's Maria Garrone in 2:23.05.

When her nation hosted the 2004 Summer Olympics in Athens, Sarakatsani decided to focus instead on the 100 m breaststroke. She posted a FINA B-standard entry time of 1:11.27 from the Mare Nostrum Swim Meet in Belgrade. She challenged seven other swimmers in heat five, including top medal favorites Amanda Beard of the United States, and Luo Xuejuan of China. She rounded out the field to last place in 1:12.46, more than a second off her entry time. Sarakatsani ended her third Olympic stint by sharing a twenty-ninth place tie with Argentina's Javiera Salcedo in the prelims.

After a decade out of competitive swimming, Sarakatsani began to train for a possible twelve-year Olympic comeback and her fourth Games in 2014 under the aquatics club Ionikos Nikaias.
