= Chiara Boggiatto =

Italian swimmer (born 1986)

Personal information
- Full name: Chiara Boggiatto
- Nationality: Italy
- Born: 17 February 1986 (age 40) Moncalieri, Turin
- Height: 1.72 m (5 ft 8 in)

Sport
- Sport: Swimming
- Strokes: Breaststroke
- Club: Sisport Fiat Torino
Medal record
European Championships (LC)
Silver medal – second place	2012 Debrecen	4 x 100 m medley
European Championships (SC)
Bronze medal – third place	2005 Trieste	100 m breaststroke
Bronze medal – third place	2005 Trieste	200 m breaststroke
Bronze medal – third place	2010 Eindhoven	200 m breaststroke
Mediterranean Games
Gold medal – first place	2001 Tunis	200m Breaststroke

Chiara Boggiatto (born 17 February 1986 in Moncalieri, Turin) is an Italian breaststroke swimmer. She was several times finalist in European and World Championship swimming 200 m breaststroke and relays. She participated for Italy at the 2004 Summer Olympics in Athens, Greece and the 2012 Summer Olympics in London, Great Britain.

She is a sibling of Alessio Boggiatto, a world class medley swimmer.

== See also ==
- Swimming at the 2004 Summer Olympics – Women's 100 metre breaststroke
- Swimming at the 2004 Summer Olympics – Women's 200 metre breaststroke
- Swimming at the 2004 Summer Olympics – Women's 4 × 100 metre medley relay
- European SC Championships 2003
- European SC Championships 2005
