= Javiera Salcedo =

Argentine swimmer (born 1977)

Personal information
- National team: Argentina
- Born: 29 November 1977 (age 48) San Nicolás, Buenos Aires, Argentina
- Height: 1.66 m (5 ft 5 in)
- Weight: 55 kg (121 lb)

Sport
- Sport: Swimming
- Strokes: Breaststroke
- Club: JCC Buenos Aires

Javiera Salcedo (born November 29, 1977) is an Argentine former swimmer, who specialized in breaststroke events. She blasted an Argentine record of 1:11.79 to pull off a fifth-place effort in the 100 m breaststroke at the 2007 Pan American Games in Rio de Janeiro, Brazil.

Salcedo qualified for the women's 100 m breaststroke at the 2004 Summer Olympics in Athens, by clearing a FINA B-standard entry time of 1:12.08 from the Spanish Spring Open Championships in Cádiz. She challenged seven other swimmers in heat three, including 15-year-olds Annabelle Carey of New Zealand and Lee Ji-Young of South Korea. She edged out Philippines' Jaclyn Pangilinan to take a fourth spot by one hundredth of a second (0.01) in 1:12.46. Salcedo failed to advance into the semifinals, as she shared a twenty-ninth place tie with Greece's Aikaterini Sarakatsani in the preliminaries.
