= Varduhi Avetisyan =

Armenian swimmer (born 1986)

Personal information
- Full name: Varduhi Avetisyan
- Nationality: Armenia
- Born: February 27, 1986 (age 40) Armenian SSR

Sport
- Sport: Swimming
- Strokes: Breaststroke
Medal record
Women's Swimming
Representing Armenia

Varduhi Avetisyan (Armenian: Վարդուհի Ավէտիսյան, born February 27, 1986, in Armenian SSR) is an Armenian retired swimmer. She competed at the 2004 Summer Olympics in the women's 100 metre breaststroke.
