= Maria Östling =

Swedish swimmer

Personal information
- Full name: Maria Östling
- Nationality: Sweden
- Born: 17 January 1978 (age 48) Gnesta, Sweden

Sport
- Sport: Swimming
- Strokes: Breaststroke
Medal record
Women's swimming
Representing Sweden
World Championships (SC)
Bronze medal – third place	1999 Hong Kong	4×50 m medley
European Championships (LC)
Gold medal – first place	1999 Istanbul	4×100 m medley
Gold medal – first place	2004 Madrid	50 m breaststroke
European Championships (SC)
Bronze medal – third place	1998 Sheffield	4×50 m medley

Maria Cecilia Christina Östling (born 17 January 1978) is a former breaststroke swimmer from Sweden, who twice won a gold medal at the European Championships. She competed for her native country at the 1996 Summer Olympics in Atlanta, Georgia, in the women's 100 m breaststroke (23rd place) and the women's 200 m breaststroke (21st place). Östling also participated in the 2004 Summer Olympics, finishing in 17th place in the women's 100 m breaststroke.

== Clubs ==
- SS Mora 1991–1996
- Södertörns SS 1996–present
