= Vipa Bernhardt =

German swimmer (born 1982)

Personal information
- Full name: Vipa Bernhardt
- National team: Germany
- Born: 20 September 1982 (age 43) Riyadh, Saudi Arabia
- Height: 1.65 m (5 ft 5 in)
- Weight: 60 kg (132 lb)

Sport
- Sport: Swimming
- Strokes: Breaststroke
- Club: SG Frankfurt
- College team: University of Florida (U.S.)
- Coach: Gregg Troy (U.S.)

Vipa Bernhardt (born 20 September 1982) is a German former competitive swimmer who specialized in breaststroke events. She was a member of the swimming team for Schwimmgemeinschaft Frankfurt. Bernhardt was also a college swimmer for the Florida Gators swimming and diving team under head coach Gregg Troy at the University of Florida in Gainesville, Florida.

Bernhardt qualified for the women's 100-meter breaststroke at the 2004 Summer Olympics in Athens, Greece, by attaining an A-standard entry time of 1:09.04 at the German Olympic trials. Bernhardt failed to advance to the Olympic final, and she placed thirteenth overall in the semifinal, with a time of 1:09.72.

Bernhardt graduated from the University of Florida with a Bachelor of Science degree major in neurobiology and a Bachelor of Arts degree major in music performance, as well as a Ph.D. in biomedical sciences.
