= Melissa Ashby =

Grenadian swimmer (born 1986)

Personal information
- Full name: Melissa Ashby
- National team: Grenada
- Born: 16 March 1986 (age 40)
- Height: 1.65 m (5 ft 5 in)
- Weight: 60 kg (132 lb)

Sport
- Sport: Swimming
- Strokes: Breaststroke

Melissa Ashby (born March 6, 1986) is a Grenadian former swimmer, who specialized in breaststroke events. Ashby qualified for the women's 100 m breaststroke at the 2004 Summer Olympics in Athens, by receiving a Universality place from FINA, in an entry time of 1:20.53. She challenged seven other swimmers in heat one, including Bolivia's Katerine Moreno, who competed at her third Olympics since 1988. She raced to fifth place in 1:22.67, just 2.14 seconds off her entry time. Ashby failed to advance into the semifinals, as she placed forty-fifth overall in the prelims.
