= Nayana Shakya =

Nepalese swimmer

Personal information
- Full name: Nayana Shakya
- National team: Nepal
- Born: 10 May 1982 (age 44) Kathmandu, Nepal
- Height: 1.65 m (5 ft 5 in)
- Weight: 60 kg (132 lb)

Sport
- Sport: Swimming
- Strokes: Breaststroke

Nayana Shakya (Nepali: नयना शाक्य) (born May 10, 1982) is a Nepalese former swimmer, who specialized in breaststroke events. Shakya qualified for the women's 100 m breaststroke at the 2004 Summer Olympics in Athens, by receiving a Universality place from FINA, in an entry time of 1:34.99. She challenged seven other swimmers in heat one, including Bolivia's Katerine Moreno, who competed at her third Olympics since 1988. She posted a lifetime best of 1:32.92 to edge out Rwanda's Pamela Girimbabazi for a seventh seed by nearly 18 seconds. Shakya failed to advance into the semifinals, as she placed forty-seventh overall in the preliminaries.

She was also a member of the Nepal basketball team until 2014.
