= Brooke Hanson =

Australian swimmer

Personal information
- Full name: Brooke Louise Hanson
- National team: Australia
- Born: 18 March 1978 (age 48) Sydney, New South Wales, Australia
- Height: 1.75 m (5 ft 9 in)
- Weight: 67 kg (148 lb)

Sport
- Sport: Swimming
- Strokes: breaststroke, medley
- Club: Nunawading Swimming Club
Medal record
Women's swimming
Representing Australia
Olympic Games
| Gold medal – first place | 2004 Athens | 4×100 m medley |
| Silver medal – second place | 2004 Athens | 100 m breaststroke |
World Championships (LC)
| Gold medal – first place | 2005 Montreal | 4×100 m medley |
| Silver medal – second place | 2003 Barcelona | 50 m breaststroke |
| Bronze medal – third place | 2005 Montreal | 50 m breaststroke |
World Championships (SC)
| Gold medal – first place | 2004 Indianapolis | 50 m breaststroke |
| Gold medal – first place | 2004 Indianapolis | 100 m breaststroke |
| Gold medal – first place | 2004 Indianapolis | 200 m breaststroke |
| Gold medal – first place | 2004 Indianapolis | 100 m medley |
| Gold medal – first place | 2004 Indianapolis | 200 m medley |
| Gold medal – first place | 2004 Indianapolis | 4×100 m medley |
| Gold medal – first place | 2006 Shanghai | 100 m medley |
| Gold medal – first place | 2006 Shanghai | 4×100 m medley |
| Silver medal – second place | 2006 Shanghai | 50 m breaststroke |
| Bronze medal – third place | 2000 Athens | 200 m breaststroke |
Commonwealth Games
| Silver medal – second place | 2002 Manchester | 100 m breaststroke |
| Silver medal – second place | 2006 Melbourne | 200 m medley |
Summer Universiade
| Silver medal – second place | 1999 Mallorca | 200 m breaststroke |
| Bronze medal – third place | 1999 Mallorca | 100 m breaststroke |

Brooke Louise Hanson, OAM (born 18 March 1978) is an Australian former competitive swimmer, Olympic gold medallist, world champion, and former world record-holder.

== Swimming career ==
A swimmer since the age of four, Hanson was the youngest swimmer on the Australian national team at the 1994 Commonwealth Games, where she finished fourth in the 200-metre breaststroke. However, she would not qualify for another major international competition for eight years, until she qualified for the 100- and 200-metre breaststroke at the 2002 Commonwealth Games. At the 2003 World Aquatics Championships, she would finish second in the 50-metre breaststroke and sixth in the 100-metre breaststroke.

At the 2004 Summer Olympics, Hanson won a gold medal as part of the Australian 4×100-metre medley relay team by swimming the breaststroke leg in a preliminary heat (Leisel Jones swam the breaststroke leg in the final). Jones' selection was the source of much discussion, and rumours spread of conflict between the two. She also won silver in the 100-metre breaststroke, finishing 0.01s ahead of Jones.

Several weeks later, Hanson competed at the 2004 FINA Short Course World Championships in Indianapolis, Indiana. Most of the medal-winners from the recently finished Olympics chose not to attend which allowed Hanson to win six gold medals, five of which were for individual events.

2005 was a difficult year for Hanson. She was defeated by both Jade Edmistone and Leisel Jones in the 50- and 100-metre breaststroke at the Australian Championships. At the 2005 World Aquatics Championships in Montreal, Hanson missed the medals in both the 100-metre breaststroke and the 200-metre individual medley, but claimed bronze in the 50-metre breaststroke.

She admitted after the 2006 Commonwealth Games trials that she had been close to retiring. She missed qualification for the 50- and 100-metre breaststroke events, where the three positions were claimed by Jones, Edmistone and Tarnee White respectively. She qualified for the 200 m breaststroke and individual medley, and claimed silver in the latter event behind young teammate Stephanie Rice.

She swims with the Nunawading Swimming Club in Melbourne.

== Career after swimming ==
In 2006, she joined the health and lifestyle program What's Good For You team and was a presenter in the second series of the show. At the 2007 Logies, she was nominated for Most Popular Female New Talent for her role in the show.

In 2008, she auditioned unsuccessfully for Gladiators on the Seven Network.

== Personal life ==
On 17 June 2007, Hanson was taken to hospital after collapsing after an apparent electric shock after climbing out of a spa at a pool and spa show in Melbourne. An investigation by Energy Safe Victoria found no fault with the spa.

Hanson is married to Jared Clarke and they have four children. Their son Jack died in 2012 at nine months of age due to chronic lung disease.

== See also ==
- List of Olympic medalists in swimming (women)
- List of World Aquatics Championships medalists in swimming (women)
- List of Commonwealth Games medallists in swimming (women)
- World record progression 4 × 100 metres medley relay
