= Íris Edda Heimisdóttir =

Icelandic swimmer

Personal information
- Full name: Íris Edda Heimisdóttir
- National team: Iceland
- Born: 8 February 1984 (age 42) Reykjavík, Iceland
- Height: 1.80 m (5 ft 11 in)
- Weight: 79 kg (174 lb)

Sport
- Sport: Swimming
- Strokes: Breaststroke
- Club: Keflavík íþrótta- og ungmennafélag

Íris Edda Heimisdóttir (born February 8, 1984) is an Icelandic former swimmer who specialized in breaststroke events. She is a two-time Olympian (2000 and 2004) and a former Icelandic record holder in the 100 and 200 m breaststroke.

Íris made her Olympic debut as Iceland's youngest swimmer (aged 16) at the 2000 Summer Olympics in Sydney. There, she failed to reach the semifinals in any of her individual events, finishing thirty-third in the 100 m breaststroke (1:14.07) and thirty-second in the 200 m breaststroke (2:38.52).

At the 2004 Summer Olympics in Athens, Íris shortened her program, swimming only in the 100 m breaststroke. She cleared a FINA B-standard entry time of 1:13.28 at the Croatian Open Championships in Dubrovnik. She challenged seven other swimmers in the same heat as Sydney, including 13-year-old Yip Tsz Wa of Hong Kong. She rounded out the field in last place by less than 0.18 of a second behind Yip in 1:15.35. Íris failed to advance into the semifinals, as she placed forty-eighth overall in the preliminaries rounds.

Shortly after the Olympics, Íris retired from swimming to pursue her career in professional modeling and physical fitness.
