= Leisel Jones =

Australian swimmer (born 1985)

Leisel Jones OAM
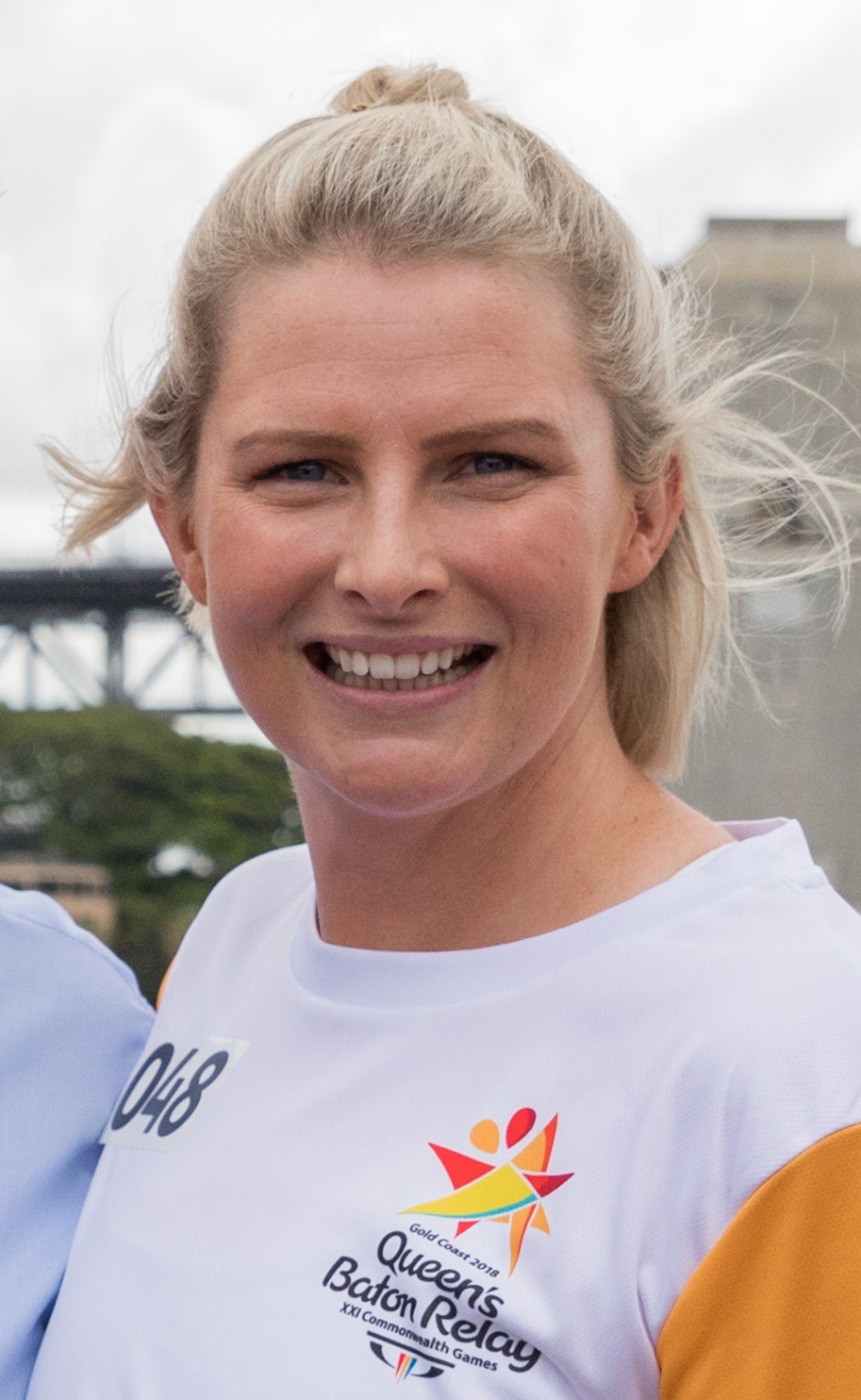
- Jones in 2018

Personal information
- Full name: Leisel Marie Jones
- Nicknames: "Diesel", "Lethal Leisel"
- National team: Australia
- Born: Leisel Marie Jones; 30 August 1985 (age 41) Katherine, Northern Territory, Australia
- Height: 174 cm (5 ft 9 in)
- Weight: 68 kg (150 lb)
- Spouse: Damon Martin (m. 2018)

Sport
- Sport: Swimming
- Strokes: Breaststroke
Medal record
Representing Australia
Women's swimming
Event	1st	2nd	3rd
Olympic Games	3	5	1
World Championships (LC)	7	4	3
World Championships (SC)	0	1	1
Pan Pacific Championships	1	4	1
Commonwealth Games	10	1	0
Total	21	15	6
Women's swimming
Representing Australia
Olympic Games
Gold medal – first place	2004 Athens	4×100 m medley
Gold medal – first place	2008 Beijing	100 m breaststroke
Gold medal – first place	2008 Beijing	4×100 m medley
Silver medal – second place	2000 Sydney	100 m breaststroke
Silver medal – second place	2000 Sydney	4×100 m medley
Silver medal – second place	2004 Athens	200 m breaststroke
Silver medal – second place	2008 Beijing	200 m breaststroke
Silver medal – second place	2012 London	4×100 m medley
Bronze medal – third place	2004 Athens	100 m breaststroke
World Championships (LC)
Gold medal – first place	2001 Fukuoka	4×100 m medley
Gold medal – first place	2005 Montreal	100 m breaststroke
Gold medal – first place	2005 Montreal	200 m breaststroke
Gold medal – first place	2005 Montreal	4×100 m medley
Gold medal – first place	2007 Melbourne	100 m breaststroke
Gold medal – first place	2007 Melbourne	200 m breaststroke
Gold medal – first place	2007 Melbourne	4×100 m medley
Silver medal – second place	2001 Fukuoka	100 m breaststroke
Silver medal – second place	2003 Barcelona	200 m breaststroke
Silver medal – second place	2007 Melbourne	50 m breaststroke
Silver medal – second place	2011 Shanghai	100 m breaststroke
Bronze medal – third place	2003 Barcelona	100 m breaststroke
Bronze medal – third place	2003 Barcelona	4×100 m medley
Bronze medal – third place	2011 Shanghai	4×100 m medley
World Championships (SC)
Silver medal – second place	2010 Dubai	100 m breaststroke
Bronze medal – third place	2010 Dubai	4×100 m medley
Pan Pacific Championships
Gold medal – first place	2002 Yokohama	4×100 m medley
Silver medal – second place	2002 Yokohama	200 m breaststroke
Silver medal – second place	2010 Irvine	100 m breaststroke
Silver medal – second place	2010 Irvine	200 m breaststroke
Silver medal – second place	2010 Irvine	4×100 m medley
Bronze medal – third place	2010 Irvine	50 m breaststroke
Commonwealth Games
Gold medal – first place	2002 Manchester	100 m breaststroke
Gold medal – first place	2002 Manchester	200 m breaststroke
Gold medal – first place	2002 Manchester	4×100 m medley
Gold medal – first place	2006 Melbourne	50 m breaststroke
Gold medal – first place	2006 Melbourne	100 m breaststroke
Gold medal – first place	2006 Melbourne	200 m breaststroke
Gold medal – first place	2006 Melbourne	4×100 m medley
Gold medal – first place	2010 Delhi	100 m breaststroke
Gold medal – first place	2010 Delhi	200 m breaststroke
Gold medal – first place	2010 Delhi	4×100 m medley
Silver medal – second place	2010 Delhi	50 m breaststroke

Leisel Marie Jones, OAM (born 30 August 1985) is an Australian former competition swimmer and Olympic gold medallist. A participant in the 2000 Summer Olympics – at just 15 years old – and the 2004 Summer Olympics, she was part of the gold-medal-winning Australian team in the women's 4×100-metre medley relay at the Athens Games in 2004 and a gold medallist for 100-metre breaststroke in the 2008 Summer Olympics in Beijing.

On 17 March 2012, Jones earned selection to compete at the 2012 Summer Olympics in London, and became the first Australian swimmer to compete at four Olympic games. There, she won her ninth Olympic medal, a silver medal in the 4×100-metre medley relay.

Jones is noted for employing a classic breaststroke technique, typified by a slow but deeper stroke cycle and also by her slow starts. Along with South African champion Penny Heyns, she is regarded as one of the greatest breaststroke swimmers ever.

== Personal ==
While at Southern Cross Catholic College, Jones used to train at the Redcliffe club in Scarborough, Queensland, and was coached by Ken Wood. Her training partners included fellow Australian team members, Geoff Huegill and Jessicah Schipper. After her disappointing campaign in Athens, Jones moved to train at the Fortitude Valley Pool in Brisbane, Australia, alongside Libby Lenton, under Swiss-born coach Stephan Widmar at the Commercial Swimming Club. Following the move, Jones began to speak openly about the depression and self-esteem issues that had plagued her following her being thrust into the spotlight at such a young age. The successes that followed endeared her to an Australian public that had been critical of her attitude following her failure to capture individual gold in Athens. Some, including Dawn Fraser, believed Jones had acted immaturely and ungratefully, particularly in her indifferent displays of emotion during post-race interviews and medal ceremonies.

In 2009, Jones became the new face of the World Animal Protection Australia & New Zealand anti-whaling campaign.

Jones confirmed her retirement from swimming in November 2012. She planned to begin a university degree in psychology in 2013.

In 2015, Jones published an autobiography titled Body Lengths.

== Career ==
Jones was selected for the Australian team at just 14 years of age, qualifying in the 100-metre breaststroke by winning the event at the Australian Championships in May 2000 in Sydney, ending the international career of former world champion Samantha Riley.

=== 2000 Olympics ===
Jones swam a personal best in the final at the Sydney Olympics to claim an unexpected silver medal behind American Megan Quann. She also combined with Dyana Calub, Petria Thomas and Susie O'Neill in the 4×100-metre medley relay to win silver, again behind the Americans. Jones left school aged 15 to concentrate on swimming.

At the 2001 World Aquatics Championships in Fukuoka, Japan, Jones was now one of the established swimmers and expected to win medals. She finished second to China's Luo Xuejuan. The competition also marked her international debut in the 200-metre breaststroke, where she came fourth place (2:25.46). She also collected a gold in the medley relay alongside Calub, Thomas and Sarah Ryan, the first time that the US women had been beaten at world or Olympic level in this event, excluding the systemically doped East German and Chinese teams.

In 2002, Jones claimed her first titles on the international arena, claiming the breaststroke double at the 2002 Commonwealth Games in Manchester, England. Australia also won the medley relay.

At the 2003 World Aquatics Championships in Barcelona, Jones set a world record in the semifinals of the 100-metre breaststroke (1:06.37). However, she succumbed to nerves in the final and came third, with Luo again winning the event. She also achieved a silver in the 200-metre breaststroke in Barcelona, behind Amanda Beard in (2:24.33). She collected a bronze in the medley relay.

In the month leading up to the Athens Olympics, Jones set a world record (2:22.96) in the 200-metre breaststroke in a meet in Brisbane, Australia. This led to high expectations of an even better performance in Athens, as Jones had not been rested prior to swimming the world record. However, it was reclaimed by Beard at the US Olympic trials only a few days later.

=== 2004 Olympics ===
In Athens, Jones was again the quickest qualifier of the 100-metre breaststroke, after setting an Olympic record (1:06.78) in the semifinals, which was almost two seconds clear of the then second fastest swimmer in the event's history, Amanda Beard. However, in the final race she finished in the bronze position. In the 200-metre breaststroke, she attempted to take an attacking approach, but faded in the last 50 metres and was pipped to the wall by Amanda Beard, winning silver. Australia went on to win the 4×100-metre medley relay, giving Jones her first Olympic gold.

Jones' world record in the 100-metre breaststroke was broken at the 2005 World Aquatics Championships in Montreal, Canada by Jessica Hardy of the United States in 1:06.20, again in the semifinal. However, this time the expectations turned to Hardy and Jones turned the tables and beat her to the wall, breaking through for her first win at world or Olympic level. She also broke the world record for the 200-metre breaststroke (2:21.72), on 29 July 2005. In the process she won the gold medal, leaving her rivals more than six metres behind. For her efforts she was named by Swimming World magazine as the Female World Swimmer of the Year in 2005.

The changes which occurred in 2005 continued to pay off at the Australian Commonwealth Games Swimming Trials in early 2006 where Jones broke her personal best time in the 50-metre breaststroke (30.85) and took 1.18 seconds off her previous world record in the 200-metre breaststroke (2.20:54). On Day 5 of the Australian Nationals Jones swam a world record in the 100-metre breaststroke final. Jones won the Australian championship in a time of 1:05.71 which lowered the previous mark by 0.49 of a second.

Jones completed a clean sweep of the breaststroke events (50-, 100- and 200-metre) at the 2006 Commonwealth Games—the only time this has been achieved in the breaststroke events in the games' history. In the butterfly events (50-, 100- and 200-metre) at the 2002 Manchester Games, Petria Thomas was the first swimmer in Commonwealth Games history to complete a clean sweep. The 50-metre events were introduced at the Manchester Games. In the 50-metre breaststroke, an event she had only recently begun competing in, she defeated the reigning world champion and world record-holder Jade Edmistone. She later won another gold in the 200-metre breaststroke and completed the sweep with the gold medal in the 100-metre in a world record time of 1:05.09 – an effort that saw her own world record reduced 0.62 of a second and was declared "Beamonesque" by aquatics journalist Craig Lord, a reference to Bob Beamon's legendary long jump at the Mexico City Olympics. A fourth gold medal in world record time in the 4×100-metre medley relay with Sophie Edington, Jessicah Schipper and Libby Lenton rounded off her Commonwealth Games.

In 2007, she competed in the World Championships and won the 100-metre breaststroke, 200-metre breaststroke, and 4×100-metre medley relay, setting a world record in the relay. She also won silver in the 50-metre breaststroke. She then left Brisbane and Widmer to move to Melbourne to train under Rohan Taylor, so that she could live with her fiancé Marty Pask, an Australian rules footballer with the Western Bulldogs. Her dissolution of a successful partnership raised eyebrows and many questioned whether putting her personal life ahead of a proven competitive formula would backfire in the pool.

In early 2008, she won the breaststroke double at the 2008 Australian Swimming Championships to qualify for the Beijing Olympics.

Although missing the World Short Course Championships in Manchester due to the preparation for the 2008 Beijing Olympics she broke her own world record over 100-metre breaststroke (SC) in 1:03.72 at the Telstra Grand Prix in Canberra.

=== 2008 Olympics ===
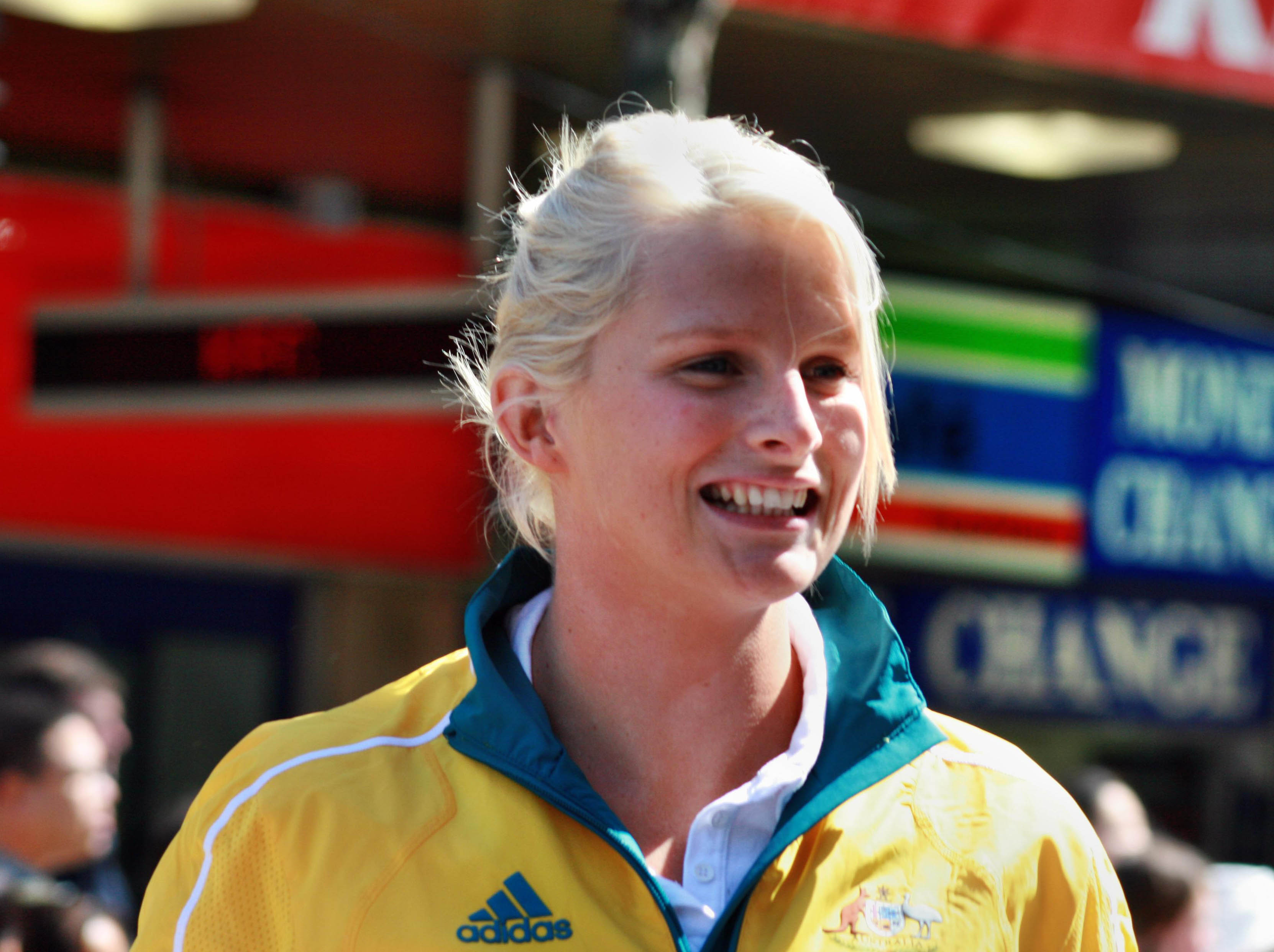
Jones in 2008

Jones won gold at the 2008 Beijing Olympics in 100-metre breaststroke, touching the line a full body length ahead of her rival. Her time of 1:05.17 was 1.66 seconds faster than the American silver medalist Rebecca Soni. While she was the favourite to win in the 200-metre breaststroke, she was beaten by Soni, who won gold in world record time. Jones took the silver. She also won a gold medal in the 4×100-metre medley relay, with the Australian team breaking the previous world record by three seconds.

Jones was awarded the Telstra Swimmer Of The Year award as part of the year's international all-star team, in Sydney in October 2008.

At the World Cup meeting at Berlin, Germany, Jones set world records in the 100- and 200-metre breaststroke (short course). Jones had a low-key year and opted out of the 2009 World Championships.

=== 2012 Olympics ===
Jones confirmed that she was aiming for the 2012 Olympics in London and competed at the Pan Pacific Championships and the Commonwealth Games in 2010. Jones confirmed her place on these teams by winning the 50-, 100- and 200-metre breaststroke at the 2010 Telstra Australian Swimming Championships.

At the Pan Pacific Swimming Championships in Irvine, California, in 2010 Jones collected three silver medals and a bronze. She competed in the 50-metre breaststroke (bronze) 100-metre breaststroke (silver), 200-metre breaststroke (silver), and the 4×100-metre medley relay (silver) events. In all four of events, she was behind the Americans; in the 50-metre she was behind Jessica Hardy and fellow Australian Leiston Pickett, and in the 100- and 200-metre she finished behind Rebecca Soni.

After earning selection to compete at the 2012 London Olympics, Jones became the first Australian swimmer to compete at four Olympic games. Together with Emily Seebohm, Alicia Coutts and Melanie Schlanger, she won a silver medal for Australia in the 4×100-metre medley relay.

=== Retirement ===
Jones confirmed her retirement from swimming on 16 November 2012.

In 2015, Jones appeared in the Australian version of I'm a Celebrity...Get Me Out of Here! (Australian TV series). She was, however, voted off the show in the first week.

In January 2016, Jones graduated from the Nutrition Coach course at the Australian Institute of Fitness. She believes she is "so much more informed now" than when she was swimming in terms of good nutrition.

== Recognition ==
- 2004 – Order of Australia for service to sport as a Gold Medallist at the Athens 2004 Olympic Games.
- 2005 & 2006 – World Swimmer of the Year
- 2006 – Australian Swimmer of the Year.
- 2015 – Sport Australia Hall of Fame inductee.
- 2017 – International Swimming Hall of Fame inductee.

== See also ==
- List of Australian records in swimming
- List of Commonwealth Games records in swimming
- List of multiple Summer Olympic medalists
- List of Olympic medalists in swimming (women)
- World record progression 100 metres breaststroke
- World record progression 200 metres breaststroke
- World record progression 4 × 100 metres medley relay

Records
Preceded by Penelope Heyns; Jessica Hardy	Women's 100-metre breaststroke world record-holder (long course); 21 July 2003 – 25 July 2005; 3 February 2006 – 27 July 2009	Succeeded by Jessica Hardy; Rebecca Soni
Preceded by Amanda Beard; Amanda Beard	Women's 200-metre breaststroke world record-holder (long course); 10 July 2004 – 12 July 2004; 29 July 2005 – 15 August 2008	Succeeded by Amanda Beard; Rebecca Soni
Awards
Preceded by Yana Klochkova	Swimming World; World Swimmer of the Year; 2005–2006	Succeeded by Laure Manaudou
Preceded by Petria Thomas; Jodie Henry	Swimming World; Pacific Rim Swimmer of the Year; 2003; 2005–2006	Succeeded by Jodie Henry; Libby Lenton
Sporting positions
Preceded by László Cseh	Mare Nostrum Tour Overall Winner; 2006	Succeeded by Tara Kirk
