= İlkay Dikmen =

Turkish swimmer (born 1981)

Personal information
- Nationality: Turkey
- Born: February 2, 1981 (age 45) İzmir, Turkey
- Height: 166 cm (5 ft 5 in)
- Weight: 60 kg (130 lb)

Sport
- Sport: Swimming
- Strokes: Breaststroke
- Club: Fenerbahçe Swimming
Medal record
Representing Turkey
Women's swimming
Mediterranean Games
Silver medal – second place	2001 Tunis	100m breast
Silver medal – second place	2001 Tunis	200m breast

İlkay Dikmen (born February 2, 1981) is a Turkish swimmer competing in the breaststroke events. The 166 cm (5 ft 5 in) tall sportswoman at 60 kg (130 lb) is a member of Fenerbahçe Swimming in Istanbul.

== Biography ==
She was born to Atilla and İlknur Dikmen in İzmir. She has a younger brother Eray.

In 1992, she became the Turkish champion in her age group in the 100 m and 200 m breaststroke, the 100 m backstroke, the 100 m freestyle and the 200 m individual medley events. She swam in the swimming team of Fenerbahçe during the last two years of high school.

After completing the high school in Turkey, she went to Champaign, Illinois,[United States for university education. Between 2000 and 2003, Dikmen swam for the University of Illinois' sports team Illinois Fighting Illini. She contributed to her school's success and set also a school record in the 200-yard breaststroke event.

Dikmen took part at the 100 m breaststroke and 200 m breaststroke events of the 2000 Summer Olympics and 2004 Summer Olympics. In July 2004, she carried the Olympic torch in Istanbul.

At the European Short Course Swimming Championships 2005 held in Trieste, Italy, she set a national record in 200 m breaststroke with 2:27.98.

== Achievements ==
Year	Competition	Venue	Position	Event	Notes
Representing Turkey
2000	Summer Olympics	Sydney, Australia	23rd	100 m breaststroke	1:11.51
2000	Summer Olympics	Sydney, Australia	24th	200 m breaststroke	2:33.34
2001	Mediterranean Games	Tunis, Tunisia	2nd place, silver medalist(s)	100 m breaststroke	1:11.17
2001	Mediterranean Games	Tunis, Tunisia	2nd place, silver medalist(s)	200 m breaststroke	2:32.34
2004	Summer Olympics	Athens, Greece	26th	100 m breaststroke	1:11.69
2004	Summer Olympics	Athens, Greece	19th	200 m breaststroke	2:32.69
2005	European Short Course Swimming Championships	Trieste, Italy	11th	200 m breaststroke	2.27.98 NR
2005	Mediterranean Games	Almería, Spain	4th	100 m breaststroke	1:11.77
2005	23rd Summer Universiade	İzmir, Turkey	8th	100 m breaststroke	1:11.70

== Honors ==
- 2003 Illinois Swimming Association Swimmer of the Year
