= Eeva Saarinen =

Finnish swimmer (born 1984)

Eeva Kuusela
Personal information
- Full name: Eeva Kuusela
- Nationality: Finland
- Born: 12 June 1984 (age 42) Keuruu, Finland
- Height: 1.69 m (5 ft 7 in)
- Weight: 68 kg (150 lb)

Sport
- Sport: Swimming
- Strokes: Breaststroke
- Club: Tampereen Uimaseura

Eeva Kuusela née Saarinen (born 12 June 1984 in Keuruu, Finland) is a female breaststroke swimmer from Finland. She competed for her native country at the 2004 Summer Olympics in Athens, Greece.
