= Natalia Hissamutdinova =

Estonian swimmer

Personal information
- Born: 16 October 1983 (age 42) Kohtla-Järve, then part of Estonian SSR, Soviet Union
- Height: 174 cm (5 ft 9 in)

Sport
- Sport: Swimming

Natalia Hissamutdinova (born 16 November 1983) is an Estonian breaststroke and medley swimmer. She is 37-time long course and 64-time short course Estonian swimming champion. She has broken 71 Estonian records in swimming.
