= Amanda Beard =

American swimmer (born 1981)

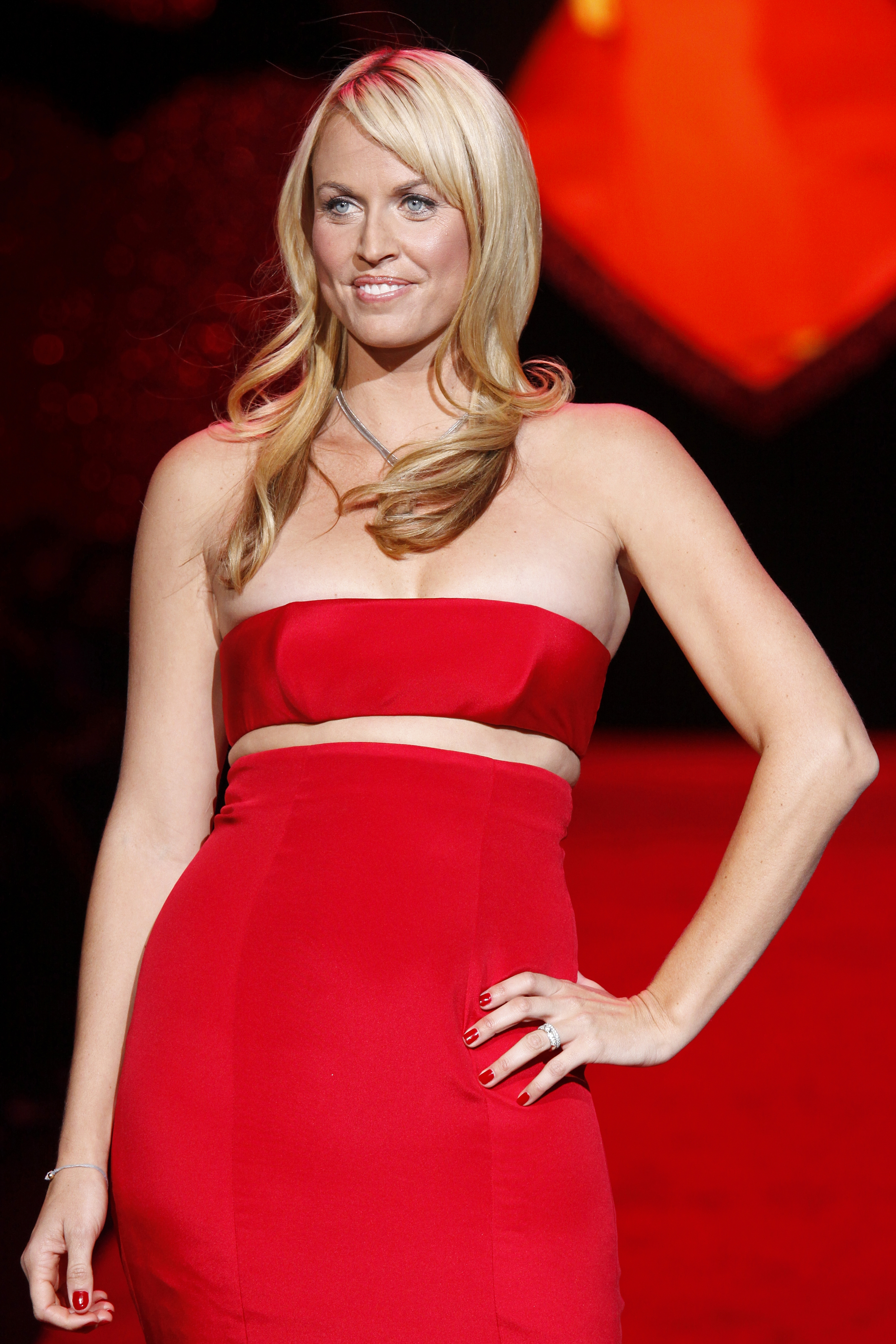
- Beard at the 2009 Heart Truth fashion show
- Sports career
- National team: United States
- Born: Amanda Ray Beard; October 29, 1981 (age 44) Newport Beach, California, U.S.
- Occupations: Swim Coaching; Broadcasting; Spokesperson
- Height: 5 ft 8 in (173 cm)
- Weight: 130 lb (59 kg)
- Spouse: Sacha Brown (m. 2009)
- Website: AmandaBeard.net
- Sport: Swimming
- Strokes: Breaststroke, individual medley
- Club: Irvine Novaquatics
- College team: University of Arizona
- Coach: Dave Salo (Irvine Novaquatics); Frank Busch (U. of Arizona)
Medal record
Women's swimming
Representing the United States
Olympic Games
Gold medal – first place	1996 Atlanta	4×100 m medley
Gold medal – first place	2004 Athens	200 m breaststroke
Silver medal – second place	1996 Atlanta	100 m breaststroke
Silver medal – second place	1996 Atlanta	200 m breaststroke
Silver medal – second place	2004 Athens	200 m medley
Silver medal – second place	2004 Athens	4×100 m medley
Bronze medal – third place	2000 Sydney	200 m breaststroke
World Championships (LC)
Gold medal – first place	2003 Barcelona	200 m breaststroke
Silver medal – second place	2003 Barcelona	100 m breaststroke
Silver medal – second place	2003 Barcelona	4×100 m medley
World Championships (SC)
Silver medal – second place	1997 Gothenburg	4×100 m medley
Silver medal – second place	2002 Moscow	4×100 m medley
Silver medal – second place	2004 Indianapolis	200 m breaststroke
Silver medal – second place	2004 Indianapolis	4×100 m medley
Pan Pacific Championships
Gold medal – first place	2002 Yokohama	100 m breaststroke
Gold medal – first place	2002 Yokohama	200 m breaststroke
Silver medal – second place	2002 Yokohama	4×100 m medley
Silver medal – second place	1995 Atlanta	4×100 m medley
Bronze medal – third place	1995 Atlanta	100 m breaststroke
Bronze medal – third place	1995 Atlanta	200 m breaststroke
Summer Universiade
Silver medal – second place	1999 Majorca	100 m breaststroke

Signature
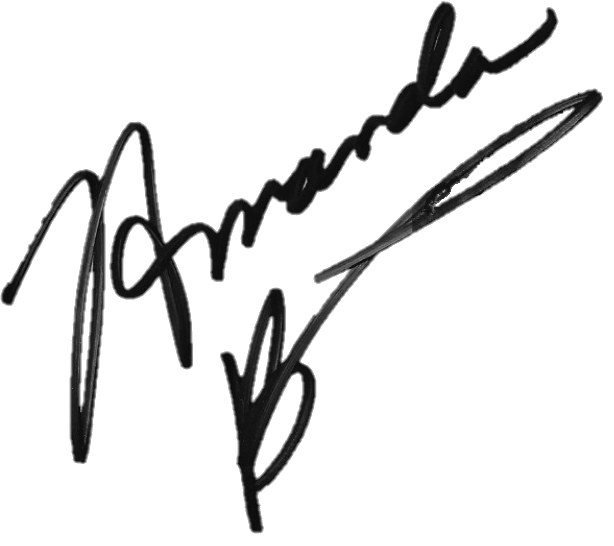

Amanda Ray Beard (born October 29, 1981), also known by her married name Amanda Brown after 2009, is an American swimmer and a seven-time Olympic medalist with two gold, four silver, and one bronze medal. She is a former world record holder in the 200-meter breaststroke long course. An exceptionally accomplished competitor, Beard captured a total of twenty-one medals in major international competition, five gold, thirteen silver, and three bronze spanning the Olympics, the World Championships, the Pan Pacific Championships, and the Summer Universiade. In addition to brief careers in modeling, advertising, and broadcasting, she has worked as a swimming coach and instructor.

== Early life and swimming ==
Beard was born October 29, 1981 in Newport Beach, California. Her father Daniel, a Professor at a local college and mother Gayle, a long serving art teacher, primarily for high schools, divorced around 1993 when Beard was twelve. Amanda began competing in swimming at an early age. Her two older sisters, Leah and Taryn both competed in swimming when Amanda was young, and which may have subtly influenced her to pursue the sport. She attended Irvine High School in Irvine California, competing in the 1996 Atlanta Olympics as only a Freshman. She trained with the Irvine Novaquatics during her High School years under Hall of Fame Coach Dave Salo and age-group coach Brian Pajer. Though Coach Salo preferred his High School swimming competitors to train no more than ten hours a week, he and age group coach Brian Pajer helped shape Amanda in her early years into a world ranked breaststroke competitor, and she subsequently ceased competing in club soccer in early 1994 to focus exclusively on swimming. At 14, after a meteoric rise in the sport in a two year period, Beard had a world rating of fourth in the 200 meter breaststroke, and was rated sixth in the 100 breaststroke. Salo's approach to training high school age competitors focused more on intensity than very long distance training sessions.

While representing Irvine High School, Beard held the California Interscholastic Federation Division 1 record in the 100-meter breaststroke of 1:01.79. A notably dominant regional team, the Irvine High School Vaquero's Women's swim team, frequently with Beard's participation, won the Division I Southern Section (CIF) Championships five years successively from 1996-2001.

Gaining national recognition at 14 in 1995, Beard won the 100-meter breaststroke national championship.

== 1996 Atlanta Olympics ==
At the March 1996 Olympic trials, Beard won both the 100 and 200-meter breaststroke, qualifying in both events.

Having qualified at the trials, Beard made her inaugural Olympic appearance at the age of 14 at the 1996 Summer Olympics in Atlanta. She was often photographed clutching her teddy bear, even on the medal stand. With her three medals, Beard had the distinction of being the second-youngest American Olympic medalist. Beard won a gold in the 4x100 meter medley relay with a combined team time of 4:02.88, a silver in the 100 meter breaststroke with an American record time of 1:08.09, and a silver in the 200 meter breaststroke with a time of 2:25.75. In the 100-meter breaststroke, South African gold medalist Penny Heyns had broken her own former world record in the preliminary heats, but had a bad turn in the finals allowing Beard to gain ground. In the close finish, Beard touched only .36 seconds behind Heyns.

=== University of Arizona ===
Beard attended the University of Arizona, where she competed for the Arizona Wildcats swimming and diving team under ASCAA Hall of Fame Coach Frank Busch for two seasons. During her time as a Wildcat, in 2001 Beard captured an NCAA National Championship title in her signature event, the 200 meter breaststroke. She was selected as an All-American ten times, and was instrumental in lifting the 2000 Arizona Women's swim team to their inaugural championship in the Pac-10 Conference. In 2003, she became the world champion and American record-holder in the 200-meter breaststroke.

== 2000 Sydney Olympics ==
At the 2000 Summer Olympics in Sydney, Australia, Beard won a bronze medal in the 200-meter breaststroke, with a time of 2:25.35.

== 2004 Athens Olympics ==
At the 2004 U.S. Olympic Swim Trials, she qualified to participate in four events at the Athens Olympics. In trial heats, she broke the world record in the 200-meter breaststroke.

In 2004 Olympic competition, in a close race Beard won a gold medal in the 200-meter breaststroke with a time of 2:23.37. In the exciting 200-meter finish, Beard accelerated in the last five meters, touching out Australian Leisel Jones by a mere .23 seconds.

Beard won silver in the 200-meter individual medley where she swam a time of 2:11.70 and a second silver in the 4×100-meter medley relay where the U.S. team swam a combined time of 3:59.12. In an historic finish, the Australians won the gold medal, making them the first team other than Germany or American to take the gold in the event. Beard, swam well, as her split in the medley relay, was the fastest of the eight competing American women (1:06.32).

In the 100-meter breaststroke, Beard finished fourth with a time of 1:07.44, placing her only .28 seconds behind bronze medalist Leisel Jones of Australia who swam a 1:07.16.

== 2008 Beijing Olympics ==
At the 2008 U.S. Olympic Swim Trials, Beard finished second in the 200-meter breaststroke event, qualifying her for her fourth consecutive Olympics. On July 30, 2008, at the U.S. swimming team's final training in Singapore, Beard, together with Dara Torres and Natalie Coughlin, were elected co-captains of the U.S. Olympic women's swimming team.

At the Olympics in Beijing, Beard failed to reach the semi-finals in the 200-meter breaststroke, placing 18th in the preliminaries.

=== 2010 U.S. Swimming Nationals ===
In August 2010, she came out of retirement to compete at the 2010 Conoco Phillips National Championships. She finished second in the 200-meter breaststroke finals at 2:26.50, qualifying her for the Pan Pac team to represent the United States later in the month.

In the 100-meter breaststroke, Amanda Beard swam a 1:08.72 in prelims and 1:09.12 in finals, finishing 6th.

After the U.S. Nationals, Beard and Natalie Coughlin were nominated co-captains of U.S. national team once again. During the Pan Pacific Swimming Championships, Amanda Beard signed up for her two signature events, the 100- and the 200-meter breaststroke. Beard qualified for finals in both events, but failed to medal. She was fifth in the 100-meter breaststroke (1:07.49) and fifth in the 200-meter breaststroke (2:24.30).

== 2012 London Summer Olympics ==
Beard failed to qualify for the 2012 Olympic team after finishing 5th in the 200-meter breaststroke at the Olympic swimming trials.

=== Swimming honors ===
Beard's success has earned her the American Swimmer of the Year Award twice. In 2008, she was made a member of the University of Arizona Hall of Fame. In a distinctive and rather exclusive honor, in 2018, Beard became a member of the International Swimming Hall of Fame

== Swim coaching ==
Beard accumulated significant experience as a swimming technique consultant, but less experience as a full-time coach. In 2010, she was the co-founder of Beard Swim Co., in Washington, where she had served as the Chief Operations Officer. She worked for a period as a volunteer coach at the University of California Los Angeles, and worked from 2010-2017 as a consulting stroke specialist at Beard Swim Company. At King Aquatics, she served three years advising swimmers on their stroke techniques.

In June 2023, Beard began employment as an Assistant Swim Coach at the University of Arizona under Head Coach Augie Busch. As of the 2025 season, Beard remained as Arizona coach.

=== Modeling and advertising ===
Her modeling work has included appearances in FHM, the 2006 Sports Illustrated Swimsuit Edition, and the July 2007 issue of Playboy magazine, in which she posed nude.

She is a spokeswoman for Defenders of Wildlife, and enjoys interior decorating. Amanda placed eighth in the Toyota Grand Prix of Long Beach Celebrity car race in 2006.

In November 2007, Beard made her first television commercial for GoDaddy entitled "Shock". It featured her "flashing" the seven Olympic medals she won from 1996 to 2004. Mark Spitz made a cameo appearance.

In April 2008, she joined Fox Network's popular sports talk program, The Best Damn Sports Show Period as a correspondent, covering major sporting events.

In 2008, Beard participated in an anti-fur campaign for the organization People for the Ethical Treatment of Animals (PETA). She was photographed semi-nude (again covering her breasts and not exposing her nipples) in front of an American flag. The flag in that photograph is hung incorrectly according to the United States Flag Code with the blue field (canton) to the upper right. Shortly after the PETA campaign was released, accusations of hypocrisy surfaced. Beard had told a fashion blogger the year before that her favorite shoes were leather sandals, and she had stated during an interview with SmartMoney magazine that she would never buy a low-quality leather jacket.

=== Personal life ===
Beard follows a paleo diet. She reports a case of mild dyslexia, which caused trouble with grades in school. She is married to photographer Sacha Brown. On September 15, 2009, she gave birth to their first child, a boy named Blaise Ray Brown. Their daughter, Doone Isla Brown, was born on June 19, 2013.

==== Body dysmorphia ====
After achieving an athletic scholarship to the University of Arizona, Beard began to struggle with body dysmorphic disorder. Stress from wearing a swimsuit in front of others as well as seeing the photo-shopping process of her ads caused Beard to desire having a body which matched that in her photos. Beard has said that "even if it had hurt my swimming, I wouldn't have stopped. I wanted to be a great swimmer, but more than that, I wanted to be pretty, skinny, and perfect."

=== Autobiography ===
Beard released an autobiography on April 3, 2012, entitled In the Water They Can't See You Cry: A Memoir. She explains the title's significance as the sensation of putting her face in the water while swimming to hide any tears she shed into her goggles. The book cites her parents' divorce at the age of 12 as the beginning of her personal struggles, as well as her perfectionist nature. In the memoir, Beard chronicles struggles with self-mutilation, depression and drug use. She credits her husband with encouraging her to seek therapy.

== Personal bests ==
Beard's personal bests in long-course meters are:

- 100 m breaststroke: 1:07.42, 2003 World Aquatics Championships
- 200 m breaststroke: 2:22.44, 2004 U.S. Olympic Swimming Trials 2004
- 200 m individual medley: 2:11.70, 2004 Summer Olympics

== Bibliography ==
- Beard, Amanda with Rebecca Paley. In the Water They Can't See You Cry: A Memoir. New York, Simon & Schuster, April 3, 2012. ISBN 978-1451644371.

== See also ==
- List of Olympic medalists in swimming (women)
- List of University of Arizona people
- List of World Aquatics Championships medalists in swimming (women)
- World record progression 200 metres breaststroke

Records
Preceded by Qi Hui; Leisel Jones	Women's 200-meter breaststroke world record-holder July 25, 2003 (tied) – July 10, 2004; July 12, 2004 – July 29, 2005	Succeeded by Leisel Jones; Leisel Jones
Awards
Preceded by Natalie Coughlin	Swimming World; American Swimmer of the Year; 2003–2004	Succeeded by Katie Hoff
