= Mirna Jukić =

Austrian swimmer (born 1986)

- Jukić in 2026

Personal information
- Born: 9 April 1986 (age 40) Novi Sad, SR Serbia, SFR Yugoslavia
- Height: 1.78 m (5 ft 10 in)
- Weight: 68 kg (150 lb)

Sport
- Sport: Swimming
- Strokes: Breaststroke
Medal record
Women's swimming
Representing Austria
Olympic Games
Bronze medal – third place	2008 Beijing	100 m breaststroke
World Championships (LC)
Bronze medal – third place	2005 Montreal	200 m breaststroke
Bronze medal – third place	2009 Rome	200 m breaststroke
World Championships (SC)
Bronze medal – third place	2002 Moscow	200 m breaststroke
European Championships (LC)
Gold medal – first place	2002 Berlin	200 m breaststroke
Gold medal – first place	2004 Madrid	200 m breaststroke
Gold medal – first place	2008 Eindhoven	100 m breaststroke
Silver medal – second place	2008 Eindhoven	200 m breaststroke
Bronze medal – third place	2004 Madrid	100 m breaststroke
Bronze medal – third place	2008 Eindhoven	50 m breaststroke
European Championships (SC)
Gold medal – first place	2002 Riesa	200 m breaststroke
Gold medal – first place	2003 Dublin	200 m breaststroke
Silver medal – second place	2001 Antwerp	100 m breaststroke
Silver medal – second place	2001 Antwerp	200 m breaststroke
Silver medal – second place	2002 Riesa	100 m breaststroke
Silver medal – second place	2004 Vienna	100 m breaststroke
Silver medal – second place	2004 Vienna	200 m breaststroke
Silver medal – second place	2007 Debrecen	100 m breaststroke
Silver medal – second place	2007 Debrecen	200 m breaststroke
Silver medal – second place	2008 Rijeka	200 m breaststroke
Bronze medal – third place	2003 Dublin	100 m breaststroke
Bronze medal – third place	2008 Rijeka	100 m breaststroke

Mirna Jukić (born 9 April 1986) is a retired Austrian swimmer who won a bronze medal in both short course and long course at the world championships in swimming. She is trained by her father Željko Jukić, a former basketball player. She has had numerous European and World championship successes.

== Family ==
Jukić was born in Novi Sad, Serbia and grew up in Vukovar, Croatia. In November 1991, the family moved to Zagreb, and her father started training her at Mladost in 1996. Her brother, Dinko Jukić, with whom she was trained early on, also became an international-level swimmer. In the autumn of 1999, the family moved to Vienna, Austria, and the same year Mirna became an Austrian citizen. Her brother became an Austrian citizen in 2000, while the parents remained Croatian citizens.

== Olympic career ==
At the 2008 Olympics, Jukić garnered a bronze medal in the 100 m breaststroke (1:07.34); she also swam the 200 m breaststroke. At the 2009 World Aquatics Championships she won the bronze medal in the 200 m breaststroke final with a time of 2:21.97.

== Training ==
For the 2004 and 2008 Olympics, Jukić trained at The Race Club, a swimming club founded by Olympic swimmers Gary Hall, Jr. and his father, Gary Hall, Sr. The Race Club, originally known as "The World Team," was designed to serve as a training group for elite swimmers across the world in preparation for the 2000 Sydney Olympic Games. To be able to train with the Race Club, one must either have been ranked in the top 20 in the world the past 3 calendar years or top 3 in their nation in the past year. The Race Club included such well known swimmers as Roland Mark Schoeman, Mark Foster, Ryk Neethling, Ricardo Busquets and Therese Alshammar.

== Broadcasting ==
In January 2010, Mirna Jukić was the host of the Croatian team in Graz for the 2010 European Men's Handball Championship.

== See also ==
- The Race Club

Awards
Preceded by Stephanie Graf	(Austria) Austrian Sportswoman of the year 2002	Succeeded by Michaela Dorfmeister
Preceded by Nicole Hosp	(Austria) Austrian Sportswoman of the year 2008–2009	Succeeded by Andrea Fischbacher
