= Majken Thorup =

Danish swimmer

Personal information
- Born: 1 May 1979 (age 47) Hadsund, Denmark
- Height: 1.74 m (5 ft 9 in)
- Weight: 59 kg (130 lb)

Sport
- Sport: Swimming
- Club: Aalborg Svømmeklub, Aalborg
Medal record
Women's swimming
Representing Denmark
European Championships
| Bronze medal – third place | 2004 Madrid | 50 m breaststroke |

Majken Thorup Toft (born 1 May 1979) is a Danish former swimmer who won a bronze medal in the 50 m breaststroke at the 2004 European Aquatics Championships. The same year she competed in three events at the 2004 Summer Olympics, but was eliminated in the preliminaries. She retired from swimming in 2005 due to pericarditis that resulted in her hospitalization earlier that year. During her career she set 27 national records.
