= Sarah Poewe =

South African / German swimmer (born 1983)

Personal information
- Full name: Sarah Poewe
- Nationality: South Africa; Germany
- Born: 3 March 1983 (age 43) Cape Town, South Africa

Sport
- Sport: Swimming
- Club: Bayer-Wuppertal, Germany
- College team: University of Georgia (U.S.)
Medal record
Women's swimming
Representing South Africa
World Championships (SC)
| Gold medal – first place | 2000 Athens | 50 m breaststroke |
| Gold medal – first place | 2000 Athens | 100 m breaststroke |
| Silver medal – second place | 2002 Moscow | 100 m breaststroke |
Pan Pacific Championships
| Bronze medal – third place | 1999 Sydney | 200 m breaststroke |
Commonwealth Games
| Silver medal – second place | 2002 Manchester | 50 m breaststroke |
| Silver medal – second place | 2002 Manchester | 200 m breaststroke |
| Bronze medal – third place | 2002 Manchester | 100 m breaststroke |
Representing Germany
Olympic Games
| Bronze medal – third place | 2004 Athens | 4×100 m medley |
World Championships (LC)
| Bronze medal – third place | 2005 Montreal | 4×100 m medley |
| Bronze medal – third place | 2009 Rome | 4×100 m medley |
European Championships (LC)
| Gold medal – first place | 2012 Debrecen | 100 m breaststroke |
| Gold medal – first place | 2012 Debrecen | 4 x 100 m medley |
| Silver medal – second place | 2006 Budapest | 4x100 m medley |
| Bronze medal – third place | 2012 Debrecen | 200 m breaststroke |
European Championships (SC)
| Gold medal – first place | 2002 Riesa | 100 m breaststroke |
| Gold medal – first place | 2003 Dublin | 50 m breaststroke |
| Gold medal – first place | 2003 Dublin | 100 m breaststroke |
| Gold medal – first place | 2004 Vienna | 50 m breaststroke |
| Gold medal – first place | 2004 Vienna | 100 m breaststroke |
| Silver medal – second place | 2002 Riesa | 50 m breaststroke |
| Silver medal – second place | 2002 Riesa | 200 m breaststroke |
| Silver medal – second place | 2002 Riesa | 4x50 m medley |
| Silver medal – second place | 2003 Dublin | 4x50 m medley |
| Silver medal – second place | 2004 Vienna | 4x50 m medley |
| Bronze medal – third place | 2004 Vienna | 200 m breaststroke |
| Bronze medal – third place | 2007 Debrecen | 50 m breaststroke |

Sarah Poewe (born 3 March 1983) is an Olympic breaststroke swimmer who has competed internationally for both South Africa and Germany.

Poewe was born in Cape Town, South Africa, the daughter of Lorrain (née Stoch) and Reinhardt Poewe. She lives in Wuppertal, Germany. Her mother is from a Jewish family in South Africa, and her father is German.

At the age of 14, she made her international debut at the 1997 Pan Pacific Championships. Poewe was the voted the Best Female Swimmer in the 1998 Junior Olympics in Moscow. She won the Hungarian National Championships in 100-meter breaststroke 23 June 1999. When she was 17, Poewe competed for the South African swimming team in three events at the 2000 Olympic Games, and finished in fourth place in the women's 100 m breaststroke.

In 2001, Poewe won the South African National Championships in the 100-meter breaststroke. At the 2001 World Championships, Poewe finished fourth in the 100-meter breaststroke.

Poewe represented Germany in the 2004 Olympics, where she was part of the team that won the bronze medal in the women's 4 × 100 m medley. She also represented Germany at the 2008 and 2012 Summer Olympics. In Beijing 2008, she swam in the 100m and 200m breaststroke and the 4 × 100 m medley but didn't medal in any race. In London 2012, Poewe swam in the 100m breaststroke and the 4 × 100 m medley, and again didn't medal in either race. She placed 9th in the 4 × 100 m medleys for the 2008 and 2012 Summer Olympics.

== See also ==
- List of select Jewish swimmers
- Georgia Bulldogs
