= Smiljana Marinović =

Croatian swimmer (born 1977)

Personal information
- Born: September 25, 1977 (age 48) Split, Yugoslavia

Sport
- Sport: Swimming

Smiljana Marinović (born 25 September 1977 in Split) is an Olympic and national-record holding breaststroke swimmer from Croatia. She swam at the Olympics in 2000, 2004 and 2008. In July 2009, she set the Croatian Record in the long course 100 Breaststroke at 1:10.42.

She also swam for Croatia internationally at the 2003 and 2005 World Championships.
