= Swimming at the 2001 World Aquatics Championships – Women's 200 metre breaststroke =

Women's 200 metre breaststroke at the 2001 FINA World Championships
- Dates: 24 July 2001 (heats, semifinals); 25 July 2001 (final)
- Competitors: 33
- Winning time: 2 minutes 24.90 seconds

Medalists
gold medal	Ágnes Kovács	Hungary
silver medal	Qi Hui	China
bronze medal	Luo Xuejuan	China

The women's 200 metre breaststroke event at the 2001 World Aquatics Championships took place 25 July. The heats and semifinals took place 24 July, with the final being held on 25 July.

== Records ==
Prior to this competition, the existing world and competition records were as follows:

World record	Qi Hui (CHN)	2:22.99	Hangzhou, China	13 April 2001
Championship record	Ágnes Kovács (HUN)	2:25.45	Perth, Australia	15 January 1998

The following record was established during the competition:

Date	Round	Name	Nation	Time	Record
24 July	Semifinal 1	Beatrice Câșlaru	Romania	2:25.00	CR
25 July	Final	Ágnes Kovács	Hungary	2:24.90	CR

== Results ==
=== Heats ===
Rank	Name	Nationality	Time	Notes
1	Kristy Kowal	United States	2:27.40	Q
2	Mirna Jukić	Austria	2:28.53	Q
3	Yuko Sakaguchi	Japan	2:28.85	Q
4	Ágnes Kovács	Hungary	2:29.04	Q
5	Olga Bakaldina	Russia	2:29.72	Q
6	Sarah Poewe	South Africa	2:29.85	Q
7	Leisel Jones	Australia	2:30.26	Q
8	Elvira Fischer	Austria	2:30.31	Q
9	Simone Weiler	Germany	2:30.35	Q
10	Beatrice Câșlaru	Romania	2:30.48	Q
11	Christin Petelski	Canada	2:31.01	Q
11	Qi Hui	China	2:31.01	Q
13	Luo Xuejuan	China	2:31.14	Q
13	Jaime King	United Kingdom	2:31.14	Q
15	Brooke Hanson	Australia	2:31.25	Q
16	Megan Quann	United States	2:31.38	Q
17	Junko Isoda	Japan	2:31.39	
18	İlkay Dikmen	Turkey	2:33.29	
19	Natalia Hissamutdinova	Estonia	2:34.66	
20	Ku Hyo-Jin	South Korea	2:35.12	
21	Rhiannon Leier	Canada	2:35.18	
22	Anne-Mari Gulbrandsen	Norway	2:36.23	
23	Yi Ting Siow	Malaysia	2:38.07	
24	Agata Czaplicki	Switzerland	2:40.37	
25	Chen Yi-Fan	Chinese Taipei	2:44.97	
26	Shun Kwan Andrea Chum	Macau	2:46.38	
27	Anastasiya Korolyova	Uzbekistan	2:46.62	
28	Beatriz Cordon Towsend	Guatemala	2:47.50	
29	Rebecca Heng	Singapore	2:48.20	
30	Katerine Moreno	Bolivia	2:51.52	
31	Weng Lam Cheong	Macau	2:51.55	
32	Yang Chin-Kuei	Chinese Taipei	2:54.61	
–	Nicolette Teo	Singapore	DSQ	

=== Semifinals ===
Rank	Name	Nationality	Time	Notes
1	Beatrice Câșlaru	Romania	2:25.00	Q, CR
2	Ágnes Kovács	Hungary	2:25.83	Q
3	Luo Xuejuan	China	2:26.03	Q
4	Kristy Kowal	United States	2:26.25	Q
5	Olga Bakaldina	Russia	2:26.63	Q
6	Qi Hui	China	2:27.24	Q
7	Leisel Jones	Australia	2:28.11	Q
8	Mirna Jukić	Austria	2:28.41	Q
9	Yuko Sakaguchi	Japan	2:28.50	
10	Elvira Fischer	Austria	2:28.71	
11	Sarah Poewe	South Africa	2:28.76	
12	Megan Quann	United States	2:29.25	
13	Brooke Hanson	Australia	2:29.40	
14	Simone Weiler	Germany	2:31.13	
15	Christin Petelski	Canada	2:31.73	
16	Jaime King	United Kingdom	2:34.67	

=== Final ===
Rank	Name	Nationality	Time	Notes
1st place, gold medalist(s)	Ágnes Kovács	Hungary	2:24.90	CR
2nd place, silver medalist(s)	Qi Hui	China	2:25.09	
3rd place, bronze medalist(s)	Luo Xuejuan	China	2:25.29	
4	Leisel Jones	Australia	2:25.46	
5	Kristy Kowal	United States	2:25.84	
6	Beatrice Câșlaru	Romania	2:25.92	
7	Olga Bakaldina	Russia	2:26.83	
8	Mirna Jukić	Austria	2:27.96	
