= Swimming at the 2001 World Aquatics Championships – Women's 4 × 100 metre medley relay =

Women's 4×100 metre medley relay at the 2001 World Aquatics Championships
- Dates: 29 July 2001
- Winning time: 4:01.50

Medalists
gold medal	Dyana Calub; Leisel Jones; Petria Thomas; Sarah Ryan	Australia
silver medal	Natalie Coughlin; Megan Quann; Mary Descenza; Erin Phenix	United States
bronze medal	Zhan Shu; Luo Xuejuan; Ruan Yi; Xu Yanwei	China

The women's 4 × 100 metre medley relay event at the 2001 World Aquatics Championships took place in Marine Messe in Fukuoka, Japan on 29 July 2001.

== Records ==
Prior to the competition, the existing world and championship records were as follows.

	Nation	Time	Location	Date
World record	United States; Barbara Bedford (1:01.39); Megan Quann (1:06.29); Jenny Thompson (57.25); Dara Torres (53.37)	3:58.30	Sydney	23 Sep 2000
Championship record	China; He Cihong (1:00.16); Dai Guohong (1:09.03); Liu Limin (58.65); Le Jingyi (53.54)	4:01.67	Rome	10 Sep 1994

The following record was established during the competition:

Date	Round	Nation	Time	Record
29 July 2001	Final	Australia; Dyana Calub (1:02.80); Leisel Jones (1:07.68); Petria Thomas (57.65); Sarah Ryan (54.09)	4:01.50	CR

== Results ==
=== Heats ===
Place	Heat	Lane	Nation	Swimmers (split)	Time	Notes
1	3	5	Germany	Antje Buschschulte (1:01.27); Simone Karn (1:09.77); Annika Mehlhorn (58.09); Katrin Meissner (55.32)	4:04.45	Q
2	3	4	United States	Courtney Shealy (1:03.13); Megan Quann (1:07.22); Shelly Ripple-Johnston (59.08); Maritza Correia (55.64)	4:05.07	Q
3	2	5	China	Zhan Shu (1:02.67); Luo Xuejuan (1:08.43); Ruan Yi (1:00.00); Xu Yanwei (54.60)	4:05.70	Q
4	2	4	Australia	Clementine Stoney (1:03.03); Tarnee White (1:10.00); Petria Thomas (57.95); Elka Graham (56.05)	4:07.03	Q
5	1	4	Japan	Mai Nakamura (1:02.37); Junko Isoda (1:10.07); Junko Onishi (59.55); Sumika Minamoto (55.38)	4:07.37	Q
6	1	5	United Kingdom	Sarah Price (1:01.80); Jaime King (1:10.18); Georgina Lee (1:00.42); Karen Pickering (55.16)	4:07.56	Q
7	1	3	Russia	Stanislava Komarova (1:02.13); Olga Bakaldina (1:10.48); Irina Bespalova (59.67); Inna Yaitskaya (56.00)	4:08.28	Q
8	2	3	Canada	Jennifer Fratesi (1:02.90); Rhiannon Leier (1:09.59); Audrey Lacroix (1:00.63); Laura Nicholls (55.46)	4:08.58	Q
9	2	7	Denmark	Louise Ørnstedt (1:02.51); Majken Thorup (1:10.39); Sophia Skou (1:00.04); Mette Jacobsen (55.75)	4:08.69	
10	3	3	Sweden	Therese Alshammar (1:04.71); Emma Igelström (1:09.81); Johanna Sjöberg (59.64); Josefin Lillhage (55.88)	4:10.04	
11	3	2	Romania	Valentina Brat (1:03.89); Beatrice Câșlaru (1:09.77); Diana Mocanu (1:00.66); Camelia Potec (56.74)	4:11.06	
12	3	6	Netherlands	Hinkelien Schreuder (1:02.99); Madelon Baans (1:09.32); Chantal Groot (1:02.91); Manon van Rooijen (56.02)	4:11.24	
13	1	6	Italy	Alessandra Cappa (1:04.18); Roberta Crescentini (1:11.36); Sara Parise (1:00.70); Cecilia Vianini (55.29)	4:11.53	
14	2	2	Singapore	Denyse Tan (1:10.09); Nicolette Teo (1:12.39); Christel Bouvron (1:04.95); Jacqueline Lim (58.90)	4:26.33	
15	1	2	Chinese Taipei	Yang Chin-Kuei (1:08.19); Chen Yi-Fan (1:18.86); Kuan Chia-Hsien (1:05.48); Sung Yi-Chien (1:00.74)	4:33.27	
16	3	7	Macau	Shun Kwan Andrea Chum (1:13.83); Weng Lam Cheong (1:18.92); Weng Tong Cheong (1:07.71); Wai Man Lam (1:04.87)	4:45.33	
–	2	6	Switzerland	Dominique Diezi (1:03.93); Carmela Schlegel; Agata Czaplicki; Nicole Zahnd	DSQ	

=== Final ===
Place	Lane	Nation	Swimmers (split)	Time	Notes
1st place, gold medalist(s)	6	Australia	Dyana Calub (1:02.80); Leisel Jones (1:07.68); Petria Thomas (57.65); Sarah Ryan (54.09)	4:01.50	CR, OC
2nd place, silver medalist(s)	5	United States	Natalie Coughlin (1:00.18); Megan Quann (1:07.67); Mary Descenza (59.59); Erin Phenix (54.37)	4:01.81	
3rd place, bronze medalist(s)	3	China	Zhan Shu (1:01.97); Luo Xuejuan (1:06.47); Ruan Yi (59.74); Xu Yanwei (54.35)	4:02.53	
4	4	Germany	Antje Buschschulte (1:01.07); Simone Karn (1:09.58); Annika Mehlhorn (58.59); Katrin Meissner (53.82)	4:03.06	
5	2	Japan	Mai Nakamura (1:01.97); Junko Isoda (1:10.14); Junko Onishi (59.14); Sumika Minamoto (55.19)	4:06.44	
6	7	United Kingdom	Sarah Price (1:01.84); Jaime King (1:09.86); Nicola Jackson (59.85); Rosalind Brett (55.11)	4:06.66	
7	1	Russia	Stanislava Komarova (1:02.06); Elena Bogomazova (1:10.05); Natalia Soutiagina (59.32); Inna Yaitskaya (56.15)	4:07.58	
8	8	Canada	Jennifer Fratesi (1:02.62); Rhiannon Leier (1:09.85); Audrey Lacroix (1:00.26); Laura Nicholls (55.37)	4:08.10	
