= Swimming at the 2001 World Aquatics Championships =

The swimming events of the 2001 World Aquatics Championships were held in a temporary pool at Marine Messe in Fukuoka, Japan in July 2001. This edition of the championships featured 20 events for both men and women, including the introduction of a 50 m event in all strokes and equality in the distance freestyle events, with both men and women swimming both 800 and 1500 m.

The swimming event resulted in eight world records and Australia topping the medal tally with 13 golds, although the USA claimed 26 total medals to 19 for Australia. The men's FINA Trophy (top individual performers) was awarded to Australia's Ian Thorpe for his three individual wins and three world records. Inge de Bruijn (the Netherlands) won the women's FINA Trophy for three individual wins. Australia swept the men's relays and won two of three of the women's relays, although were subsequently disqualified in the women's 4 × 200 m freestyle for a post-race infraction – jumping into the pool before all teams had finished.

The Seiko timing system used for the swimming events at the championships experienced some faults with the touch pads throughout the eight days of competition causing controversy amongst teams and media.

== Medal table ==
* Host nation (Japan)

| Rank | Nation | Gold | Silver | Bronze | Total |
|---|---|---|---|---|---|
| 1 | Australia (AUS) | 13 | 3 | 3 | 19 |
| 2 | United States (USA) | 9 | 9 | 8 | 26 |
| 3 | Germany (GER) | 3 | 6 | 6 | 15 |
| 4 | Netherlands (NED) | 3 | 4 | 0 | 7 |
| 5 | Ukraine (UKR) | 3 | 1 | 0 | 4 |
| 6 | China (CHN) | 2 | 2 | 3 | 7 |
| 7 | Italy (ITA) | 2 | 2 | 2 | 6 |
| 8 | Sweden (SWE) | 1 | 3 | 2 | 6 |
| 9 | Great Britain (GBR) | 1 | 2 | 4 | 7 |
| 10 | Russia (RUS) | 1 | 2 | 3 | 6 |
| 11 | Romania (ROM) | 1 | 1 | 2 | 4 |
| 12 | Hungary (HUN) | 1 | 0 | 1 | 2 |
| 13 | Austria (AUT) | 0 | 2 | 0 | 2 |
| 14 | Iceland (ISL) | 0 | 1 | 1 | 2 |
| 15 | Costa Rica (CRC) | 0 | 1 | 0 | 1 |
| 15 | Poland (POL) | 0 | 1 | 0 | 1 |
| 15 | Switzerland (SUI) | 0 | 1 | 0 | 1 |
| 18 | Japan (JPN)* | 0 | 0 | 4 | 4 |
| 19 | South Africa (RSA) | 0 | 0 | 1 | 1 |
| Totals (19 entries) | | 40 | 41 | 40 | 121 |

== Medal summary ==
=== Men ===
| Event | Gold | | Silver | | Bronze | |
|---|---|---|---|---|---|---|
| 50 m freestyle | Anthony Ervin (USA) | 22.09 | Pieter van den Hoogenband (NED) | 22.16 | Roland Schoeman (RSA) Tomohiro Yamanoi (JPN) | 22.18 |
| 100 m freestyle | Anthony Ervin (USA) | 48.33; CR, AM | Pieter van den Hoogenband (NED) | 48.43 | Lars Frölander (SWE) | 48.79 |
| 200 m freestyle | Ian Thorpe (AUS) | 1:44.06; WR | Pieter van den Hoogenband (NED) | 1:45.81 | Klete Keller (USA) | 1:47.10 |
| 400 m freestyle | Ian Thorpe (AUS) | 3:40.17; WR | Grant Hackett (AUS) | 3:42.51 | Emiliano Brembilla (ITA) | 3:45.11 |
| 800 m freestyle | Ian Thorpe (AUS) | 7:39.16; WR | Grant Hackett (AUS) | 7:40.34 | Graeme Smith (GBR) | 7:51.12 |
| 1500 m freestyle | Grant Hackett (AUS) | 14:34.56; WR | Graeme Smith (GBR) | 14:58.94; NR | Alexei Filipets (RUS) | 15:01.43 |
| 50 m backstroke | Randall Bal (USA) | 25.34 | Thomas Rupprath (GER) | 25.44 | Matt Welsh (AUS) | 25.49 |
| 100 m backstroke | Matt Welsh (AUS) | 54.31; CR | Örn Arnarson (ISL) | 54.75 | Steffen Driesen (GER) | 54.91 |
| 200 m backstroke | Aaron Peirsol (USA) | 1:57.13; CR | Markus Rogan (AUT) | 1:58.07 | Örn Arnarson (ISL) | 1:58.37 |
| 50 m breaststroke | Oleg Lisogor (UKR) | 27.52; CR | Roman Sloudnov (RUS) | 27.60 | Domenico Fioravanti (ITA) | 27.72 |
| 100 m breaststroke | Roman Sloudnov (RUS) | 1:00.16 | Domenico Fioravanti (ITA) | 1:00.47 | Ed Moses (USA) | 1:00.61 |
| 200 m breaststroke | Brendan Hansen (USA) | 2:10.69; CR | Maxim Podoprigora (AUT) | 2:11.09 | Kosuke Kitajima (JPN) | 2:11.21; AS |
| 50 m butterfly | Geoff Huegill (AUS) | 23.50 | Lars Frölander (SWE) | 23.57 | Mark Foster (GBR) | 23.62 |
| 100 m butterfly | Lars Frölander (SWE) | 52.10; CR | Ian Crocker (USA) | 52.25; AM | Geoff Huegill (AUS) | 52.36 |
| 200 m butterfly | Michael Phelps (USA) | 1:54.58; WR | Tom Malchow (USA) | 1:55.28 | Anatoly Polyakov (RUS) | 1:55.68 |
| 200 m I.M. | Massimiliano Rosolino (ITA) | 1:59.71 | Tom Wilkens (USA) | 2:00.73 | Justin Norris (AUS) | 2:00.91 |
| 400 m I.M. | Alessio Boggiatto (ITA) | 4:13.15 | Erik Vendt (USA) | 4:15.36 | Tom Wilkens (USA) | 4:15.94 |
| 4 × 100 m Freestyle Relay | Australia (AUS); Michael Klim (49.12); Ashley Callus (48.31); Todd Pearson (48.80); Ian Thorpe (47.87) | 3:14.10; CR | Netherlands (NED); Mark Veens (49.80); Johan Kenkhuis (48.56); Klaas-Erik Zwering (49.18); Pieter van den Hoogenband (47.02) | 3:14.56; ER | Germany (GER); Stefan Herbst (50.54); Torsten Spanneberg (48.86); Lars Conrad (49.08); Sven Lodziewski (49.04) | 3:17.52 |
| 4 × 200 m Freestyle Relay | Australia (AUS); Grant Hackett (1:46.11); Michael Klim (1:46.49); Bill Kirby (1:47.92); Ian Thorpe (1:44.14) | 7:04.66; WR | Italy (ITA); Emiliano Brembilla (1:48.19); Matteo Pelliciari (1:48.02); Andrea Beccari (1:47.97); Massimiliano Rosolino (1:46.68) | 7:10.86; ER | United States (USA); Scott Goldblatt (1:49.00); Nate Dusing (1:48.78); Chad Carvin (1:48.41); Klete Keller (1:47.50) | 7:13.69 |
| 4 × 100 m medley relay | Australia (AUS); Matt Welsh (55.19); Regan Harrison (1:00.80); Geoff Huegill (51.39); Ian Thorpe (47.97) | 3:35.35; CR | Germany (GER); Steffen Driesen (55.22); Jens Kruppa (1:01.06); Thomas Rupprath (51.96); Torsten Spanneberg (48.10) | 3:36.34 | Russia (RUS); Vladislav Aminov (55.63); Dmitry Komornikov (1:00.90); Vladislav Kulikov (52.01); Dmitry Chernyshov (49.23) | 3:37.77 |

Legend: WR – World record; CR – Championship record

=== Women ===
| Event | Gold | | Silver | | Bronze | |
|---|---|---|---|---|---|---|
| 50 freestyle | Inge de Bruijn (NED) | 24.47 | Therese Alshammar (SWE) | 24.88 | Sandra Völker (GER) | 24.96 |
| 100 freestyle | Inge de Bruijn (NED) | 54.18 | Katrin Meissner (GER) | 55.07 | Sandra Völker (GER) | 55.11 |
| 200 freestyle | Giaan Rooney (AUS) | 1:58.57 | Yang Yu (CHN) | 1:58.78 | Camelia Potec (ROM) | 1:58.85 |
| 400 freestyle | Yana Klochkova (UKR) | 4:07.30 | Claudia Poll (CRC) | 4:09.15 | Hannah Stockbauer (GER) | 4:09.36 |
| 800 freestyle | Hannah Stockbauer (GER) | 8:24.66 | Diana Munz (USA) | 8:28.84 | Kaitlin Sandeno (USA) | 8:31.45 |
| 1500 freestyle | Hannah Stockbauer (GER) | 16:01.02; CR | Flavia Rigamonti (SUI) | 16:05.99 | Diana Munz (USA) | 16:07.05 |
| 50 backstroke | Haley Cope (USA) | 28.51 | Antje Buschschulte (GER) | 28.53 | Natalie Coughlin (USA) | 28.54 |
| 100 backstroke | Natalie Coughlin (USA) | 1:00.37 | Diana Mocanu (ROM) | 1:00.68 | Antje Buschschulte (GER) | 1:01.42 |
| 200 backstroke | Diana Mocanu (ROM) | 2:09.94 | Stanislava Komarova (RUS) | 2:10.43 | Joanna Fargus (GBR) | 2:11.05 |
| 50 breaststroke | Luo Xuejuan (CHN) | 30.84; CR, AS | Kristy Kowal (USA) | 31.37 | Zoë Baker (GBR) | 31.40 |
| 100 breaststroke | Luo Xuejuan (CHN) | 1:07.18; CR | Leisel Jones (AUS) | 1:07.96 | Ágnes Kovács (HUN) | 1:08.50 |
| 200 breaststroke | Ágnes Kovács (HUN) | 2:24.90; CR | Qi Hui (CHN) | 2:25.09 | Luo Xuejuan (CHN) | 2:25.29 |
| 50 butterfly | Inge de Bruijn (NED) | 25.90; CR | Therese Alshammar (SWE) | 26.18 | Anna-Karin Kammerling (SWE) | 26.45 |
| 100 butterfly | Petria Thomas (AUS) | 58.27; CR | Otylia Jędrzejczak (POL) | 58.72 | Junko Onishi (JPN) | 58.88 |
| 200 butterfly | Petria Thomas (AUS) | 2:06.73; CR | Annika Mehlhorn (GER) | 2:06.97 | Kaitlin Sandeno (USA) | 2:08.52 |
| 200 I.M. | Maggie Bowen (USA) | 2:11.93 | Yana Klochkova (UKR) | 2:12.30 | Qi Hui (CHN) | 2:12.46 |
| 400 I.M. | Yana Klochkova (UKR) | 4:36.98 | Maggie Bowen (USA) | 4:39.06 | Beatrice Câșlaru (ROM) | 4:39.33 |
| 4 × 100 free relay | Germany (GER); Petra Dallmann (55.33); Antje Buschschulte (55.13); Katrin Meissner (54.07); Sandra Völker (55.05) | 3:39.58 | United States (USA); Colleen Lanne (56.15); Erin Phenix (54.68); Maritza Correia (54.94); Courtney Shealy (55.03) Great Britain (GBR); Alison Sheppard (56.15); Melanie Marshall (55.22); Rosalind Brett (54.76); Karen Pickering (54.67) | 3:40.80 | not awarded | |
| 4 × 200 m freestyle relay | Great Britain (GBR); Nicola Jackson (2:00.05); Janine Belton (2:00.64); Karen Legg (1:58.95); Karen Pickering (1:59.05) | 7:58.69; NR | Germany (GER); Silvia Szalai (2:00.39); Sara Harstick (1:59.48); Hannah Stockbauer (1:59.06); Meike Freitag (2:02.42) | 8:01.35 | Japan (JPN); Maki Mita (2:00.38); Tomoko Hagiwara (1:59.25); Tomoko Nagai (2:00.98); Eri Yamanoi (2:02.36) | 8:02.97; NR |
| 4 × 100 m medley relay | Australia (AUS); Dyana Calub (1:02.08); Leisel Jones (1:07.68); Petria Thomas (57.65); Sarah Ryan (54.09) | 4:01.50; CR, OC | United States (USA); Natalie Coughlin (1:00.18); Megan Quann (1:07.67); Mary DeScenza (59.59); Erin Phenix (54.37) | 4:01.81 | China (CHN); Zhan Shu (1:01.97); Luo Xuejuan (1:06.47); Ruan Yi (59.74); Xu Yanwei (54.35) | 4:02.53 |

Legend: WR – World record; CR – Championship record

== Records ==
The following world and championship records were set during the competition.

=== World records ===
| Date | Round | Event | Time | Name | Nation |
|---|---|---|---|---|---|
| July 22 | Final | Men's 400 metre freestyle | 3:40.17 | Ian Thorpe | Australia |
| July 23 | Semifinal 2 | Men's 100 metre breaststroke | 59.94 | Roman Sludnov | Russia |
| July 24 | Final | Men's 800 metre freestyle | 7:39.16 | Ian Thorpe | Australia |
| July 24 | Final | Men's 200 metre butterfly | 1:54.58 | Michael Phelps | United States |
| July 25 | Final | Men's 200 metre freestyle | 1:44.06 | Ian Thorpe | Australia |
| July 27 | Semifinal 2 | Men's 50 metre butterfly | 23.44 | Geoff Huegill | Australia |
| July 27 | Final | Men's 4 × 100 metre freestyle relay | 7:04.66 | Grant Hackett (1:46.11); Michael Klim (1:46.49); Bill Kirby (1:47.92); Ian Thorpe (1:44.14) | Australia |
| July 29 | Final | Men's 1500 metre freestyle | 14:34.56 | Grant Hackett | Australia |

=== Championship records ===
| Date | Round | Event | Established for | Time | Name | Nation |
|---|---|---|---|---|---|---|
| July 22 | Semifinal 2 | Men's 50 metre freestyle | (same) | 22.05 | Anthony Ervin | United States |
| July 22 | Semifinal 1 | Women's 100 metre breaststroke | (same) | 1:07.48 | Luo Xuejuan | China |
| July 22 | Final | Men's 4 × 100 metre freestyle relay | (same) | 3:14.10 | Michael Klim (49.12); Ashley Callus (48.31); Todd Pearson (48.80); Ian Thorpe (47.87) | Australia |
| July 23 | Heat 7 | Men's 100 metre breaststroke | (same) | 1:00.95 | Kosuke Kitajima | Japan |
| July 23 | Heat 8 | Men's 100 metre breaststroke | (same) | 1:00.40 | Roman Sludnov | Japan |
| July 23 | Heat 4 | Women's 50 metre backstroke | (same) | 28.60 | Haley Cope | United States |
| July 23 | Heat 4 | Men's 800 metre freestyle | (same) | 7:52.74 | Ian Thorpe | Australia |
| July 23 | Final | Women's 200 metre butterfly | (same) | 2:06.73 | Petria Thomas | Australia |
| July 23 | Final | Men's 100 metre backstroke | (same) | 54.31 | Matt Welsh | Australia |
| July 23 | Final | Women's 100 metre breaststroke | (same) | 1:07.18 | Luo Xuejuan | China |
| July 23 | Semifinal 2 | Men's 200 metre butterfly | (same) | 1:55.03 | Franck Esposito | France |
| July 23 | Semifinal 2 | Men's 200 metre butterfly | (same) | 1:55.03 | Tom Malchow | United States |
| July 23 | Semifinal 1 | Women's 50 metre backstroke | (same) | 28.49 | Natalie Coughlin | United States |
| July 24 | Heat 8 | Men's 50 metre backstroke | (same) | 25.43 | Randall Bal | United States |
| July 24 | Semifinal 2 | Men's 50 metre backstroke | (same) | 25.31 | Thomas Rupprath | Germany |
| July 24 | Heat 6 | Men's 200 metre freestyle | (same) | 1:47.18 | Pieter van den Hoogenband | Netherlands |
| July 24 | Semifinal 1 | Women's 200 metre breaststroke | (same) | 2:25.00 | Beatrice Câșlaru | Romania |
| July 24 | Semifinal 2 | Men's 200 metre freestyle | (same) | 1:45.80 | Pieter van den Hoogenband | Netherlands |
| July 25 | Heat 5 | Women's 50 metre butterfly | (same) | 26.52 | Natalie Coughlin | United States |
| July 25 | Semifinal 2 | Men's 100 metre butterfly | (same) | 52.17 | Lars Frölander | Sweden |
| July 25 | Semifinal 1 | Women's 50 metre butterfly | (same) | 26.10 | Inge de Bruijn | Netherlands |
| July 25 | Final | Women's 200 metre breaststroke | (same) | 2:24.90 | Ágnes Kovács | Hungary |
| July 26 | Heat 5 | Women's 50 metre breaststroke | (same) | 31.23 | Zoë Baker | United Kingdom |
| July 26 | Final | Women's 50 metre butterfly | (same) | 25.90 | Inge de Bruijn | Netherlands |
| July 26 | Final | Men's 100 metre butterfly | (same) | 52.10 | Lars Frölander | Sweden |
| July 26 | Semifinal 1 | Women's 50 metre breaststroke | (same) | 31.10 | Luo Xuejuan | China |
| July 26 | Final | Men's 200 metre breaststroke | (same) | 2:10.69 | Brendan Hansen | United States |
| July 26 | Semifinal 2 | Men's 100 metre freestyle | (same) | 48.57 | Pieter van den Hoogenband | Netherlands |
| July 27 | Heat 10 | Men's 50 metre butterfly | (same) | 23.71 | Geoff Huegill | Australia |
| July 27 | Heat 4 | Women's 1500 metre freestyle | (same) | 16:14.51 | Hannah Stockbauer | Germany |
| July 27 | Final | Men's 100 metre freestyle | (same) | 48.33 | Anthony Ervin | United States |
| July 27 | Final | Men's 200 metre backstroke | (same) | 1:57.13 | Aaron Peirsol | United States |
| July 27 | Final | Women's 50 metre breaststroke | (same) | 30.84 | Luo Xuejuan | China |
| July 28 | Heat 7 | Men's 50 metre breaststroke | (same) | 27.71 | James Gibson | United Kingdom |
| July 28 | Heat 3 | Men's 4 × 100 metre medley relay | (same) | 3:37.56 | Aaron Peirsol (55.36); Brendan Hansen (1:00.32); Daniel Jones (52.93); Scott Tucker (48.95) | United States |
| July 28 | Semifinal 2 | Women's 50 metre freestyle | (same) | 24.45 | Inge de Bruijn | Netherlands |
| July 28 | Semifinal 2 | Men's 50 metre breaststroke | (same) | 27.59 | Mark Warnecke | Germany |
| July 28 | Final | Women's 1500 metre freestyle | (same) | 16:01.02 | Hannah Stockbauer | Germany |
| July 28 | Final | Women's 100 metre butterfly | (same) | 58.27 | Petria Thomas | Australia |
| July 28 | Final | Men's 4 × 100 metre medley relay | (same) | 3:35.35 | Matt Welsh (55.19); Regan Harrison (1:00.80); Geoff Huegill (51.39); Ian Thorpe (47.97) | Australia |
| July 29 | Final | Men's 50 metre breaststroke | (same) | 27.52 | Oleh Lisohor | Ukraine |
| July 29 | Final | Women's 4 × 100 metre medley relay | (same) | 4:01.50 | Dyana Calub (1:02.08); Leisel Jones (1:07.68); Petria Thomas (57.65); Sarah Ryan (54.09) | Australia |

== See also ==
- List of world records in swimming
- List of World Championships records in swimming
