= 2002 Pan Pacific Swimming Championships – Women's 200 metre breaststroke =

Women's 200 metre breaststroke at the 2002 Pan Pacific Swimming Championships
- Venue: Yokohama International Swimming Pool
- Dates: August 27, 2002 (heats & semifinals); August 28, 2002 (final)
- Competitors: 24 from 9 nations
- Winning time: 2:26.31

Medalists
gold medal	Amanda Beard	United States
silver medal	Leisel Jones	Australia
bronze medal	Kristy Kowal	United States

The women's 200 metre breaststroke competition at the 2002 Pan Pacific Swimming Championships took place on August 27–28 at the Yokohama International Swimming Pool. The last champion was Penelope Heyns of South Africa.

This race consisted of four lengths of the pool, all in breaststroke.

== Records ==
Prior to this competition, the existing world and Pan Pacific records were as follows:

World record	Qi Hui (CHN)	2:22.99	Hangzhou, China	April 13, 2001
Pan Pacific Championships record	Penelope Heyns (RSA)	2:23.64	Sydney, Australia	August 27, 1999

== Results ==
All times are in minutes and seconds.

KEY:	q	Fastest non-qualifiers	Q	Qualified	CR	Championships record	NR	National record	PB	Personal best	SB	Seasonal best

=== Heats ===
The first round was held on August 27.

Rank	Heat	Lane	Name	Nationality	Time	Notes
1	3	4	Amanda Beard	United States	2:28.92	Q
2	2	4	Leisel Jones	Australia	2:29.83	Q
3	3	3	Tara Kirk	United States	2:30.89	Q
4	4	5	Kristy Kowal	United States	2:30.92	Q
5	2	5	Junko Isoda	Japan	2:31.72	Q
6	4	6	Brooke Hanson	Australia	2:32.22	Q
7	3	5	Fumiko Kawanabe	Japan	2:32.32	Q
8	4	3	Megan Quann	United States	2:32.45	Q
9	4	2	Corrie Clark	United States	2:32.47	Q
10	2	6	Rhiannon Leier	Canada	2:33.59	Q
11	2	3	Kelli Waite	Australia	2:33.59	Q
12	4	4	Luo Xuejuan	China	2:33.98	Q
13	3	6	Christin Petelski	Canada	2:34.15	Q
14	2	7	Lisa Blackburn	Canada	2:34.95	Q
15	3	2	Jane Copland	New Zealand	2:36.38	Q
16	4	1	Dena Durand	Canada	2:38.17	Q
17	4	8	Joanna Maranhão	Brazil	2:38.31	
18	3	1	Tamara Wagner	Canada	2:38.52	
19	2	1	Kristy Cameron	Canada	2:39.34	
20	4	7	Wei Min Teo	Singapore	2:39.82	
21	3	8	Hiu Nam Joyce Wong	Hong Kong	2:40.76	
22	1	4	Tse May Heng	Singapore	2:42.60	
23	1	5	Ka Lei Liu	Hong Kong	2:43.19	
24	1	3	Sin Wing Caroline Chiu	Hong Kong	2:49.60	
-	2	2	Jenny Guerrero	Philippines	DNS	
-	2	8	Andrea Cassidy	United States	DNS	
-	3	7	Jessica Abbott	Australia	DNS	

=== Semifinals ===
The semifinals were held on August 27.

Rank	Heat	Lane	Name	Nationality	Time	Notes
1	1	4	Leisel Jones	Australia	2:26.86	Q
2	1	5	Kristy Kowal	United States	2:27.34	Q
3	2	4	Amanda Beard	United States	2:27.44	Q
4	2	3	Junko Isoda	Japan	2:29.36	Q
5	1	3	Brooke Hanson	Australia	2:29.60	Q
6	2	5	Tara Kirk	United States	2:29.85	Q
7	2	6	Fumiko Kawanabe	Japan	2:30.16	Q
8	2	7	Luo Xuejuan	China	2:31.09	Q
9	1	2	Kelli Waite	Australia	2:31.61	
10	1	6	Megan Quann	United States	2:31.82	
11	2	2	Rhiannon Leier	Canada	2:32.28	
12	2	1	Lisa Blackburn	Canada	2:34.57	
13	1	7	Christin Petelski	Canada	2:35.69	
14	2	8	Dena Durand	Canada	2:36.35	
15	1	1	Jane Copland	New Zealand	2:36.40	
16	1	8	Joanna Maranhão	Brazil	2:37.99	

=== Final ===
The final was held on August 28.

Rank	Lane	Name	Nationality	Time	Notes
1st place, gold medalist(s)	3	Amanda Beard	United States	2:26.31	
2nd place, silver medalist(s)	4	Leisel Jones	Australia	2:26.42	
3rd place, bronze medalist(s)	5	Kristy Kowal	United States	2:27.59	
4	1	Luo Xuejuan	China	2:28.23	
5	6	Junko Isoda	Japan	2:29.30	
6	7	Fumiko Kawanabe	Japan	2:30.80	
7	2	Brooke Hanson	Australia	2:31.22	
8	8	Rhiannon Leier	Canada	2:32.64	
