= Swimming at the 2001 World Aquatics Championships – Women's 100 metre breaststroke =

Women's 100 metre breaststroke at the 2001 FINA World Championships
- Dates: 22 July 2001 (heats, semifinals); 23 July 2001 (final)
- Competitors: 42
- Winning time: 1 minute 7.18 seconds

Medalists
gold medal	Luo Xuejuan	China
silver medal	Leisel Jones	Australia
bronze medal	Ágnes Kovács	Hungary

The women's 100 metre breaststroke event at the 2001 World Aquatics Championships took place 23 July. The heats and semifinals took place 22 July, with the final being held on 23 July.

== Records ==
Prior to this competition, the existing world and competition records were as follows:

World record	Penelope Heyns (RSA)	1:06.52	Sydney, Australia	23 August 1999
Championship record	Samantha Riley (AUS)	1:07.69	Rome, Italy	9 September 1994

The following record was established during the competition:

Date	Round	Name	Nation	Time	Record
22 July	Semifinal 1	Luo Xuejuan	China	1:07.48	CR
23 July	Final	Luo Xuejuan	China	1:07.18	CR

== Results ==
=== Heats ===
Rank	Name	Nationality	Time	Notes
1	Sarah Poewe	South Africa	1:08.71	Q
2	Luo Xuejuan	China	1:08.78	Q
3	Leisel Jones	Australia	1:08.86	Q
4	Ágnes Kovács	Hungary	1:08.98	Q
5	Kristy Kowal	United States	1:09.02	Q
6	Rhiannon Leier	Canada	1:09.40	Q
7	Megan Quann	United States	1:09.71	Q
8	Mirna Jukić	Austria	1:09.85	Q
9	Tarnee White	Australia	1:09.94	Q
10	Simone Weiler	Germany	1:09.96	Q
11	Elena Bogomazova	Russia	1:09.99	Q
12	Junko Isoda	Japan	1:10.45	Q
13	Jaime King	United Kingdom	1:10.85	Q
14	Roberta Crescentini	Italy	1:10.90	Q
15	Madelon Baans	Netherlands	1:11.08	Q
16	Elvira Fischer	Austria	1:11.14	Q
17	Emma Igelström	Sweden	1:11.24	
18	Yuko Sakaguchi	Japan	1:11.27	
19	Christin Petelski	Canada	1:11.42	
20	Najken Thorup	Denmark	1:11.45	
21	Maria Östling	Sweden	1:11.51	
22	Emma Robinson	Ireland	1:11.70	
23	Anne-Mari Gulbrandsen	Norway	1:12.45	
24	Natalia Hissamutdinova	Estonia	1:12.60	
25	Carmela Schlegel	Switzerland	1:13.00	
26	Nicolette Teo	Singapore	1:13.01	
27	Ku Hyo-Jin	South Korea	1:13.20	
28	İlkay Dikmen	Turkey	1:13.34	
29	Ziada Jardine	South Africa	1:14.23	
30	Yi Ting Siow	Malaysia	1:14.47	
31	Valeria Silva	Peru	1:15.57	
32	Agata Czaplicki	Switzerland	1:15.69	
33	Chen Yi-Fan	Chinese Taipei	1:15.93	
34	Anastasiya Korolyova	Uzbekistan	1:17.06	
35	Katerine Moreno	Bolivia	1:17.55	
36	Weng Lam Cheong	Macau	1:17.66	
37	Rebecca Heng	Singapore	1:18.73	
38	Beatriz Cordon Towsend	Guatemala	1:20.07	
39	Yang Chin-Kuei	Chinese Taipei	1:20.88	
40	Kwan Andrea Shun Chum	Macau	1:21.42	
41	Xenia Peni	Papua New Guinea	1:23.64	
42	Lkhundev Bilguun	Mongolia	1:29.95	

=== Semifinals ===
Rank	Name	Nationality	Time	Notes
1	Luo Xuejuan	China	1:07.48	Q, CR
2	Ágnes Kovács	Hungary	1:08.02	Q
3	Leisel Jones	Australia	1:08.58	Q
4	Sarah Poewe	South Africa	1:08.98	Q
5	Mirna Jukić	Austria	1:09.31	Q
6	Megan Quann	United States	1:09.32	Q
7	Kristy Kowal	United States	1:09.37	Q
8	Rhiannon Leier	Canada	1:09.69	Q
9	Tarnee White	Australia	1:09.77	
10	Elena Bogomazova	Russia	1:09.92	
11	Simone Weiler	Germany	1:10.44	
12	Junko Isoda	Japan	1:10.79	
13	Madelon Baans	Netherlands	1:10.98	
14	Jaime King	United Kingdom	1:11.04	
15	Roberta Crescentini	Italy	1:11.12	
16	Elvira Fischer	Austria	1:11.18	

=== Final ===
Rank	Name	Nationality	Time	Notes
1st place, gold medalist(s)	Luo Xuejuan	China	1:07.18	CR
2nd place, silver medalist(s)	Leisel Jones	Australia	1:07.96	
3rd place, bronze medalist(s)	Ágnes Kovács	Hungary	1:08.50	
4	Sarah Poewe	South Africa	1:08.52	
5	Megan Quann	United States	1:08.80	
6	Kristy Kowal	United States	1:08.92	
7	Mirna Jukić	Austria	1:09.48	
8	Rhiannon Leier	Canada	1:09.90	
