= Swimming at the 2000 Summer Olympics – Women's 200 metre breaststroke =

Women's 200 metre breaststroke at the Games of the XXVII Olympiad
- Venue: Sydney International Aquatic Centre
- Date: September 20, 2000 (heats & semifinals); September 21, 2000 (final)
- Competitors: 36 from 30 nations
- Winning time: 2:24.35

Medalists
1st place, gold medalist(s)		Ágnes Kovács	Hungary
2nd place, silver medalist(s)		Kristy Kowal	United States
3rd place, bronze medalist(s)		Amanda Beard	United States

The women's 200 metre breaststroke event at the 2000 Summer Olympics took place on 20–21 September at the Sydney International Aquatic Centre in Sydney, Australia.

Charging back from third at the 150-metre turn, Hungary's Ágnes Kovács edged out U.S. swimmer Kristy Kowal on the final stretch to capture the gold in 2:24.35. Kowal, who seized off a powerful lead from the start, took home the silver in a new American record of 2:24.56. Her teammate Amanda Beard, silver medalist in Atlanta four years earlier, gave the Americans a further reason to celebrate as she enjoyed the race to move up from eighth after the semifinals for the bronze in 2:25.35, holding off a fast-pacing Qi Hui of China (2:25.36) by a hundredth of a second (0.01).

Qi was followed in fifth by Russia's Olga Bakaldina (2:25.47) and in sixth by South Africa's Sarah Poewe (2:25.72), fourth-place finalist in the 100 m breaststroke. Japan's Masami Tanaka (2:26.98) and Qi's teammate Luo Xuejuan (2:27.33) closed out the field.

World record holder Penny Heyns missed a chance to defend her Olympic title in the event, after helplessly winding up a twentieth-place effort in the prelims at 2:30.17. Shortly after the Games, she made a decision to officially announce her retirement from international swimming.

Earlier, Kovacs established a new Olympic standard of 2:24.92 on the morning prelims to clear a 2:25-barrier and cut off Heyns' record by almost half a second (0.50). Following by an evening session, she eventually lowered it to 2:24.03 in the semifinals.

== Records ==
Prior to this competition, the existing world and Olympic records were:

World record	Penny Heyns (RSA)	2:23.64	Sydney, Australia	27 August 1999
Olympic record	Penny Heyns (RSA)	2:25.41	Atlanta, United States	23 July 1996

The following new world and Olympic records were set during this competition.

Date	Event	Name	Nationality	Time	Record
20 September	Heat 5	Ágnes Kovács	Hungary	2:24.92	OR
20 September	Semifinal 1	Ágnes Kovács	Hungary	2:24.03	OR

== Results ==
=== Heats ===
Rank	Heat	Lane	Name	Nationality	Time	Notes
1	5	5	Ágnes Kovács	Hungary	2:24.92	Q, OR
2	3	4	Kristy Kowal	United States	2:26.73	Q
3	4	5	Qi Hui	China	2:26.76	Q
4	4	2	Karine Brémond	France	2:27.13	Q, NR
5	4	4	Masami Tanaka	Japan	2:27.39	Q
6	4	3	Beatrice Câșlaru	Romania	2:27.59	Q, WD
7	4	6	Caroline Hildreth	Australia	2:27.60	Q
8	3	3	Amanda Beard	United States	2:27.83	Q
9	3	5	Sarah Poewe	South Africa	2:27.84	Q
10	5	3	Olga Bakaldina	Russia	2:28.19	Q
11	4	8	Ku Hyo-jin	South Korea	2:28.21	Q, NR
12	4	7	Rebecca Brown	Australia	2:28.24	Q
13	5	6	Luo Xuejuan	China	2:28.43	Q
14	5	1	Christin Petelski	Canada	2:29.11	Q
15	3	6	Anne Poleska	Germany	2:29.15	Q
16	5	7	Alicja Pęczak	Poland	2:29.45	Q
17	5	2	Junko Isoda	Japan	2:29.60	Q
18	3	2	Ina Hüging	Germany	2:30.00	
19	4	1	Elvira Fischer	Austria	2:30.05	
20	5	4	Penny Heyns	South Africa	2:30.17	
21	3	1	Brigitte Becue	Belgium	2:31.27	
22	5	8	Agata Czaplicki	Switzerland	2:32.98	
23	3	7	Jaime King	Great Britain	2:33.10	
24	2	8	İlkay Dikmen	Turkey	2:33.34	NR
25	1	5	Isabel Ceballos	Colombia	2:34.09	
26	2	4	Inna Nikitina	Ukraine	2:34.20	
27	2	2	Siow Yi Ting	Malaysia	2:34.52	NR
28	2	3	Margarita Kalmikova	Latvia	2:35.69	
29	2	5	Adriana Marmolejo	Mexico	2:36.93	
30	2	7	Nicolette Teo	Singapore	2:37.39	
31	1	4	Jenny Rose Guerrero	Philippines	2:38.10	
32	2	6	Íris Edda Heimisdóttir	Iceland	2:38.52	
33	1	3	Olga Moltchanova	Kyrgyzstan	2:41.43	
34	2	1	Imaday Nuñez Gonzalez	Cuba	2:41.97	
35	1	6	Anastasiya Korolyova	Uzbekistan	2:43.23	
	3	8	Lourdes Becerra	Spain	DNS	

=== Semifinals ===
==== Semifinal 1 ====
Rank	Lane	Name	Nationality	Time	Notes
1	4	Kristy Kowal	United States	2:25.46	Q
2	6	Sarah Poewe	South Africa	2:25.54	Q
3	7	Luo Xuejuan	China	2:25.86	Q
4	5	Karine Brémond	France	2:27.86	
5	3	Caroline Hildreth	Australia	2:28.30	
6	2	Ku Hyo-Jin	South Korea	2:28.50	
7	1	Anne Poleska	Germany	2:28.99	
8	8	Junko Isoda	Japan	2:31.71	

==== Semifinal 2 ====
Rank	Lane	Name	Nationality	Time	Notes
1	4	Ágnes Kovács	Hungary	2:24.03	Q, OR, NR
2	5	Qi Hui	China	2:24.21	Q, NR
3	2	Olga Bakaldina	Russia	2:25.41	Q, NR
4	3	Masami Tanaka	Japan	2:26.24	Q
5	6	Amanda Beard	United States	2:26.62	Q
6	1	Christin Petelski	Canada	2:29.43	
7	7	Rebecca Brown	Australia	2:29.90	
8	8	Alicja Pęczak	Poland	2:30.02	

=== Final ===
Rank	Lane	Name	Nationality	Time	Notes
1st place, gold medalist(s)	4	Ágnes Kovács	Hungary	2:24.35	
2nd place, silver medalist(s)	6	Kristy Kowal	United States	2:24.56	AM
3rd place, bronze medalist(s)	8	Amanda Beard	United States	2:25.35	
4	5	Qi Hui	China	2:25.36	
5	3	Olga Bakaldina	Russia	2:25.47	
6	2	Sarah Poewe	South Africa	2:25.72	
7	1	Masami Tanaka	Japan	2:26.98	
8	7	Luo Xuejuan	China	2:27.33	
