= Swimming at the 2001 World Aquatics Championships – Women's 50 metre breaststroke =

Women's 50 metre breaststroke at the 2001 FINA World Championships
- Dates: 26 July 2001 (heats, semifinals); 27 July 2001 (final)
- Competitors: 39
- Winning time: 30.84 seconds

Medalists
gold medal	Luo Xuejuan	China
silver medal	Kristy Kowal	United States
bronze medal	Zoë Baker	Great Britain

The women's 50 metre breaststroke event at the 2001 World Aquatics Championships took place 27 July. The heats and semifinals took place 26 July, with the final being held on 27 July.

== Records ==
Prior to the competition, the existing world and championship records were as follows:

World record	Penelope Heyns (RSA)	30.83	Sydney, Australia	29 August 1999
Championship record	New event			

The following record was established during the competition:

Date	Round	Name	Nation	Time	Record
26 July 2001	Heat 5	Zoë Baker	United Kingdom	31.23	CR
26 July 2001	Semifinal 1	Luo Xuejuan	China	31.10	CR
27 July 2001	Final	Luo Xuejuan	China	30.84	CR

== Results ==
=== Heats ===
Rank	Name	Nationality	Time	Notes
1	Zoë Baker	United Kingdom	31.23	Q, CR
2	Kristy Kowal	United States	31.62	Q
3	Megan Quann	United States	31.77	Q
4	Brooke Hanson	Australia	31.96	Q
5	Luo Xuejuan	China	32.05	Q
5	Sarah Poewe	South Africa	32.05	Q
7	Ágnes Kovács	Hungary	32.09	Q
8	Sanae Nawata	Japan	32.25	Q
8	Roberta Crescentini	Italy	32.25	Q
10	Vera Lischka	Austria	32.31	Q
11	Elena Bogomazova	Russia	32.34	Q
12	Simone Karn	Germany	32.37	Q
13	Majken Thorup	Denmark	32.42	Q
14	Madelon Baans	Netherlands	32.55	Q
15	Tarnee White	Australia	32.62	Q
16	Emma Igelström	Sweden	32.63	Q
17	Anne-Mari Gulbrandsen	Norway	32.72	
18	Emma Robinson	Ireland	32.75	
19	Rhiannon Leier	Canada	32.79	
20	Mirna Jukić	Austria	32.81	
21	Maria Östling	Sweden	32.85	
22	Natalia Hissamutdinova	Estonia	32.96	
23	Junko Isoda	Japan	33.03	
24	Ziada Jardine	South Africa	33.33	
25	Carmela Schlegel	Switzerland	33.36	
26	İlkay Dikmen	Turkey	33.43	
27	Nicolette Teo	Singapore	33.64	
28	Christin Petelski	Canada	33.85	
29	Valeria Silva	Peru	34.01	
30	Anastasiya Korolyova	Uzbekistan	34.76	
31	Chen Yi-Fan	Chinese Taipei	35.43	
32	Weng Lam Cheong	Macau	35.60	
33	Ayeisha Collymore	Trinidad and Tobago	35.73	
34	Katerine Moreno	Bolivia	35.76	
35	Rebecca Heng	Singapore	36.26	
36	Yang Chin-Kuei	Chinese Taipei	36.91	
37	Beatriz Cordon Towsend	Guatemala	37.04	
38	Xenia Peni	Papua New Guinea	37.58	
–	Lasm Quissoh Genevieve Meledje	Ivory Coast	DSQ	

=== Semifinals ===
Rank	Name	Nationality	Time	Notes
1	Luo Xuejuan	China	31.10	Q, CR
2	Zoë Baker	United Kingdom	31.27	Q
3	Megan Quann	United States	31.58	Q
4	Kristy Kowal	United States	31.67	Q
5	Brooke Hanson	Australia	31.71	Q
6	Ágnes Kovács	Hungary	31.88	Q
7	Sarah Poewe	South Africa	32.02	Q
8	Roberta Crescentini	Italy	32.15	Q
9	Tarnee White	Australia	32.27	
10	Emma Igelström	Sweden	32.43	
11	Majken Thorup	Denmark	32.45	
12	Elena Bogomazova	Russia	32.46	
13	Simone Karn	Germany	32.51	
14	Vera Lischka	Austria	32.56	
15	Sanae Nawata	Japan	32.64	
16	Madelon Baans	Netherlands	32.71	

=== Final ===
Rank	Name	Nationality	Time	Notes
1st place, gold medalist(s)	Luo Xuejuan	China	30.84	CR
2nd place, silver medalist(s)	Kristy Kowal	United States	31.37	
3rd place, bronze medalist(s)	Zoë Baker	United Kingdom	31.40	
4	Megan Quann	United States	31.55	
5	Brooke Hanson	Australia	31.87	
6	Roberta Crescentini	Italy	31.96	
7	Sarah Poewe	South Africa	32.03	
8	Ágnes Kovács	Hungary	32.05	
