= 2002 Pan Pacific Swimming Championships – Women's 100 metre breaststroke =

Women's 100 metre breaststroke at the 2002 Pan Pacific Swimming Championships
- Venue: Yokohama International Swimming Pool
- Dates: August 24, 2002 (heats & semifinals); August 25, 2002 (final)
- Competitors: 23 from 8 nations
- Winning time: 1:08.22

Medalists
gold medal	Amanda Beard	United States
silver medal	Tara Kirk	United States
bronze medal	Luo Xuejuan	China

The women's 100 metre breaststroke competition at the 2002 Pan Pacific Swimming Championships took place on August 24–25 at the Yokohama International Swimming Pool. The last champion was Penelope Heyns of South Africa.

This race consisted of two lengths of the pool, both lengths being in breaststroke.

== Records ==
Prior to this competition, the existing world and Pan Pacific records were as follows:

World record	Penelope Heyns (RSA)	1:06.52	Sydney, Australia	August 23, 1999
Pan Pacific Championships record	Penelope Heyns (RSA)	1:06.52	Sydney, Australia	August 23, 1999

== Results ==
All times are in minutes and seconds.

KEY:	q	Fastest non-qualifiers	Q	Qualified	CR	Championships record	NR	National record	PB	Personal best	SB	Seasonal best

=== Heats ===
The first round was held on August 24.

Rank	Heat	Lane	Name	Nationality	Time	Notes
1	4	5	Tara Kirk	United States	1:08.13	Q
2	3	5	Kristy Kowal	United States	1:08.59	Q
3	2	5	Amanda Beard	United States	1:08.65	Q
4	3	4	Leisel Jones	Australia	1:09.18	Q
5	3	3	Tarnee White	Australia	1:09.26	Q
6	4	2	Gabrielle Rose	United States	1:09.38	Q
7	2	4	Megan Quann	United States	1:09.59	Q
8	2	3	Rhiannon Leier	Canada	1:09.61	Q
9	4	3	Brooke Hanson	Australia	1:09.93	Q
10	3	6	Corrie Clark	United States	1:09.99	Q
11	4	6	Junko Isoda	Japan	1:10.22	Q
12	4	4	Luo Xuejuan	China	1:10.61	Q
13	2	6	Fumiko Kawanabe	Japan	1:10.86	Q
14	2	2	Lisa Blackburn	Canada	1:10.88	Q
15	3	7	Kelli Waite	Australia	1:11.05	Q
16	4	7	Tamara Wagner	Canada	1:11.83	Q
17	3	2	Christin Petelski	Canada	1:12.39	
18	2	1	Ka Lei Liu	Hong Kong	1:13.65	
19	4	8	Kristy Cameron	Canada	1:13.75	
20	2	7	Wei Min Teo	Singapore	1:13.84	
21	3	1	Jane Copland	New Zealand	1:14.55	
22	1	4	Hiu Nam Joyce Wong	Hong Kong	1:15.59	
23	1	5	Sin Wing Caroline Chiu	Hong Kong	1:15.99	
-	1	1	Jenny Guerrero	Philippines	DNS	
-	3	3	Tse May Heng	Singapore	DQ	

=== Semifinals ===
The semifinals were held on August 24.

Rank	Heat	Lane	Name	Nationality	Time	Notes
1	1	2	Luo Xuejuan	China	1:08.14	Q
2	1	5	Leisel Jones	Australia	1:08.39	Q
3	2	5	Amanda Beard	United States	1:08.42	Q
4	2	4	Tara Kirk	United States	1:08.74	Q
5	1	4	Kristy Kowal	United States	1:09.10	Q
6	1	6	Brooke Hanson	Australia	1:09.27	Q
7	1	3	Megan Quann	United States	1:09.50	Q
8	2	3	Tarnee White	Australia	1:09.58	Q
9	2	6	Rhiannon Leier	Canada	1:09.63	
10	2	2	Junko Isoda	Japan	1:10.30	
11	2	7	Fumiko Kawanabe	Japan	1:11.19	
12	1	7	Lisa Blackburn	Canada	1:11.45	
13	2	1	Kelli Waite	Australia	1:11.74	
14	1	1	Tamara Wagner	Canada	1:12.11	
15	2	8	Christin Petelski	Canada	1:12.12	
16	1	8	Ka Lei Liu	Hong Kong	1:13.55	

=== Final ===
The final was held on August 25.

Rank	Lane	Name	Nationality	Time	Notes
1st place, gold medalist(s)	3	Amanda Beard	United States	1:08.22	
2nd place, silver medalist(s)	6	Tara Kirk	United States	1:08.66	
3rd place, bronze medalist(s)	4	Luo Xuejuan	China	1:08.70	
4	5	Leisel Jones	Australia	1:08.76	
5	2	Brooke Hanson	Australia	1:09.56	
6	7	Rhiannon Leier	Canada	1:09.84	
7	8	Fumiko Kawanabe	Japan	1:10.15	
8	1	Junko Isoda	Japan	1:10.44	
