= Swimming at the 2002 Asian Games – Women's 100 metre breaststroke =

Women's 100 metre breaststroke at the 2002 Asian Games
- Venue: Sajik Swimming Pool
- Date: 1 October 2002
- Competitors: 18 from 12 nations

Medalists
gold medal	Luo Xuejuan	China
silver medal	Qi Hui	China
bronze medal	Fumiko Kawanabe	Japan

The women's 100 metre breaststroke swimming competition at the 2002 Asian Games in Busan was held on 1 October at the Sajik Swimming Pool.

== Schedule ==
All times are Korea Standard Time (UTC+09:00)

Date	Time	Event
Tuesday, 1 October 2002	10:00	Heats
Tuesday, 1 October 2002	19:00	Final

== Records ==
Prior to this competition, the existing world, Asian and Games records were as follows.

World Record	Penelope Heyns (RSA)	1:06.52	Sydney, Australia	23 August 1999
Asian Record	Luo Xuejuan (CHN)	1:06.96	Guangzhou, China	14 November 2001
Games Record	Li Wei (CHN)	1:08.95	Bangkok, Thailand	10 December 1998

== Results ==
Legend

- DSQ — Disqualified

=== Heats ===
Rank	Heat	Athlete	Time	Notes
1	3	Luo Xuejuan (CHN)	1:09.32	
2	1	Junko Isoda (JPN)	1:11.42	
3	2	Qi Hui (CHN)	1:11.47	
4	3	Fumiko Kawanabe (JPN)	1:11.91	
5	2	Ku Hyo-jin (KOR)	1:12.01	
6	1	Cho A-ra (KOR)	1:12.47	
7	2	Jenny Guerrero (PHI)	1:13.68	
8	3	Nicolette Teo (SIN)	1:14.28	
9	1	Liu Ka Lei (HKG)	1:14.40	
10	1	Rebecca Heng (SIN)	1:14.87	
11	3	Joyce Wong (HKG)	1:15.18	
12	2	Jariyawadee Narongrit (THA)	1:15.39	
13	3	Siow Yi Ting (MAS)	1:15.66	
14	2	Andrea Chum (MAC)	1:21.81	
15	3	Nayana Shakya (NEP)	1:31.24	
16	2	Sana Abdul Wahid (PAK)	1:32.39	
17	1	Ven Malyno (CAM)	1:40.94	
—	1	Mehrunnisa Khan (PAK)	DSQ	

=== Final ===
Rank	Athlete	Time	Notes
1st place, gold medalist(s)	Luo Xuejuan (CHN)	1:06.84	AR
2nd place, silver medalist(s)	Qi Hui (CHN)	1:08.35	
3rd place, bronze medalist(s)	Fumiko Kawanabe (JPN)	1:10.11	
4	Junko Isoda (JPN)	1:10.42	
5	Ku Hyo-jin (KOR)	1:11.11	
6	Cho A-ra (KOR)	1:12.06	
7	Nicolette Teo (SIN)	1:13.48	
—	Jenny Guerrero (PHI)	DSQ	
