= Swimming at the 2002 Asian Games – Women's 200 metre breaststroke =

Women's 200 metre breaststroke at the 2002 Asian Games
- Venue: Sajik Swimming Pool
- Date: 3 October 2002
- Competitors: 14 from 9 nations

Medalists
gold medal	Qi Hui	China
silver medal	Luo Xuejuan	China
bronze medal	Fumiko Kawanabe	Japan

The women's 200 metre breaststroke swimming competition at the 2002 Asian Games in Busan was held on 3 October at the Sajik Swimming Pool.

== Schedule ==
All times are Korea Standard Time (UTC+09:00)

Date	Time	Event
Thursday, 3 October 2002	10:00	Heats
Thursday, 3 October 2002	19:00	Final

== Records ==
Prior to this competition, the existing world, Asian and Games records were as follows.

World Record	Qi Hui (CHN)	2:22.99	Hangzhou, China	13 April 2001
Asian Record	Qi Hui (CHN)	2:22.99	Hangzhou, China	13 April 2001
Games Record	Yuan Yuan (CHN)	2:28.34	Hiroshima, Japan	4 October 1994

== Results ==
=== Heats ===
Rank	Heat	Athlete	Time	Notes
1	2	Qi Hui (CHN)	2:31.04	
2	1	Junko Isoda (JPN)	2:35.13	
3	2	Cho A-ra (KOR)	2:35.16	
4	2	Fumiko Kawanabe (JPN)	2:36.33	
5	1	Luo Xuejuan (CHN)	2:37.22	
6	2	Siow Yi Ting (MAS)	2:38.11	
7	1	Jung Seul-ki (KOR)	2:38.12	
8	2	Jenny Guerrero (PHI)	2:38.74	
9	2	Rebecca Heng (SIN)	2:39.21	
10	1	Joyce Wong (HKG)	2:39.56	
11	1	Nicolette Teo (SIN)	2:39.83	
12	1	Jariyawadee Narongrit (THA)	2:42.78	
13	2	Caroline Chiu (HKG)	2:46.60	
14	1	Mehrunnisa Khan (PAK)	3:15.84	

=== Final ===
Rank	Athlete	Time	Notes
1st place, gold medalist(s)	Qi Hui (CHN)	2:24.01	GR
2nd place, silver medalist(s)	Luo Xuejuan (CHN)	2:24.67	
3rd place, bronze medalist(s)	Fumiko Kawanabe (JPN)	2:29.82	
4	Junko Isoda (JPN)	2:29.93	
5	Jung Seul-ki (KOR)	2:32.67	
6	Cho A-ra (KOR)	2:33.61	
7	Siow Yi Ting (MAS)	2:37.04	
8	Jenny Guerrero (PHI)	2:37.26	
