= Swimming at the 1998 Asian Games – Women's 200 metre breaststroke =

Women's 200 metre breaststroke at the 1998 Asian Games
- Venue: Thammasat Aquatic Center
- Date: 8 December 1998
- Competitors: 15 from 11 nations

Medalists
gold medal	Masami Tanaka	Japan
silver medal	Qi Hui	China
bronze medal	Junko Isoda	Japan

The women's 200 metre breaststroke swimming competition at the 1998 Asian Games in Bangkok was held on 8 December at the Thammasat Aquatic Center.

== Schedule ==
All times are Indochina Time (UTC+07:00)

Date	Time	Event
Tuesday, 8 December 1998	09:00	Heats
Tuesday, 8 December 1998	18:00	Final

== Results ==
=== Heats ===
Rank	Heat	Athlete	Time	Notes
1	2	Qi Hui (CHN)	2:34.33	
2	2	Masami Tanaka (JPN)	2:34.35	
3	2	Kye Yoon-hee (KOR)	2:34.55	
4	1	Wang Wei (CHN)	2:38.76	
5	1	Junko Isoda (JPN)	2:39.02	
6	1	Rita Mariani (INA)	2:39.70	
7	2	Daphne Teo (SIN)	2:40.67	
8	1	May Ooi (SIN)	2:41.31	
9	1	Tachaporn Iamsanitamorn (THA)	2:44.07	
10	2	Anastasiya Korolyova (UZB)	2:44.45	
11	2	Caroline Chiu (HKG)	2:44.93	
12	1	Lin Fang-tzu (TPE)	2:45.60	
13	2	Cheong Weng Lam (MAC)	2:47.17	
14	1	Songporn Leelakitichok (THA)	2:48.60	
15	2	Nguyễn Thị Hương (VIE)	3:01.64	

=== Final ===
Rank	Athlete	Time	Notes
1st place, gold medalist(s)	Masami Tanaka (JPN)	2:28.44	
2nd place, silver medalist(s)	Qi Hui (CHN)	2:28.71	
3rd place, bronze medalist(s)	Junko Isoda (JPN)	2:32.39	
4	Wang Wei (CHN)	2:32.52	
5	Kye Yoon-hee (KOR)	2:32.79	
6	Rita Mariani (INA)	2:38.97	
7	May Ooi (SIN)	2:40.25	
8	Daphne Teo (SIN)	2:40.85	
