= 2010 Pan Pacific Swimming Championships – Women's 100 metre breaststroke =

Women's 100 metre breaststroke at the 2010 Pan Pacific Swimming Championships
- Venue: William Woollett Jr. Aquatics Center
- Dates: August 19, 2010 (heats & finals)
- Competitors: 25 from 7 nations
- Winning time: 1:04.93

Medalists
gold medal	Rebecca Soni	United States
silver medal	Leisel Jones	Australia
bronze medal	Sarah Katsoulis	Australia

The women's 100 metre breaststroke competition at the 2010 Pan Pacific Swimming Championships took place on August 19 at the William Woollett Jr. Aquatics Center. The last champion was Tara Kirk of US.

This race consisted of two lengths of the pool, both lengths being in breaststroke.

== Records ==
Prior to this competition, the existing world and Pan Pacific records were as follows:

World record	Jessica Hardy (USA)	1:04.45	Federal Way, United States	August 7, 2009
Pan Pacific Championships record	Jessica Hardy (USA)	1:06.43	Victoria, Canada	August 18, 2006

== Results ==
All times are in minutes and seconds.

KEY:	q	Fastest non-qualifiers	Q	Qualified	CR	Championships record	NR	National record	PB	Personal best	SB	Seasonal best

=== Heats ===
The first round was held on August 19, at 10:33.

Rank	Heat	Lane	Name	Nationality	Time	Notes
1	4	4	Rebecca Soni	United States	1:05.89	QA, CR
2	2	4	Sarah Katsoulis	Australia	1:06.78	QA
3	3	4	Leisel Jones	Australia	1:06.80	QA
4	4	5	Satomi Suzuki	Japan	1:06.94	QA
5	3	5	Samantha Marshall	Australia	1:07.41	QA
6	3	2	Amanda Beard	United States	1:07.53	QA
7	3	3	Micah Lawrence	United States	1:07.62	QA
8	2	3	Mina Matsushima	Japan	1:07.74	QA
9	2	7	Tessa Wallace	Australia	1:07.92	QB
10	4	3	Ann Chandler	United States	1:08.08	QB
11	4	7	Jillian Tyler	Canada	1:08.29	QB
12	3	6	Annamay Pierse	Canada	1:08.31	QB
13	2	2	Leiston Pickett	Australia	1:08.35	QB
14	4	1	Chelsey Salli	Canada	1:08.44	QB
15	2	1	Katlin Freeman	United States	1:08.68	QB
16	4	2	Tianna Rissling	Canada	1:09.27	QB
17	2	5	Rie Kaneto	Japan	1:09.54	
18	3	7	Jeong Darae	South Korea	1:09.79	
18	4	8	Ashley McGregor	Canada	1:09.79	
20	2	6	Carolina Mussi	Brazil	1:10.54	
21	1	4	Sarra Lajnef	Tunisia	1:10.79	
22	3	1	Tatiane Sakemi	Brazil	1:10.93	
23	3	8	Ana Carvalho	Brazil	1:12.40	
24	1	3	Juliana Marin	Brazil	1:13.23	
25	1	5	Natália Favoreto	Brazil	1:15.30	
-	4	6	Fumie Kawanabe	Japan	DSQ	

=== B Final ===
The B final was held on August 19, at 18:29.

Rank	Lane	Name	Nationality	Time	Notes
9	4	Samantha Marshall	Australia	1:07.04	
10	5	Micah Lawrence	United States	1:07.85	
11	3	Chelsey Salli	Canada	1:08.15	
12	6	Rie Kaneto	Japan	1:09.38	
13	2	Jeong Darae	South Korea	1:09.69	
14	7	Carolina Mussi	Brazil	1:10.89	
15	1	Sarra Lajnef	Tunisia	1:11.05	
16	8	Tatiane Sakemi	Brazil	1:11.15	

=== A Final ===
The A final was held on August 19, at 18:29.

Rank	Lane	Name	Nationality	Time	Notes
1st place, gold medalist(s)	4	Rebecca Soni	United States	1:04.93	CR
2nd place, silver medalist(s)	3	Leisel Jones	Australia	1:05.66	
3rd place, bronze medalist(s)	5	Sarah Katsoulis	Australia	1:07.04	
4	6	Satomi Suzuki	Japan	1:07.05	
5	2	Amanda Beard	United States	1:07.49	
6	8	Annamay Pierse	Canada	1:07.90	
7	7	Mina Matsushima	Japan	1:08.32	
8	1	Jillian Tyler	Canada	1:08.45	
