= Swimming at the 2001 World Aquatics Championships – Women's 50 metre butterfly =

Women's 50 metre butterfly at the 2001 FINA World Championships
- Dates: 25 July 2001 (heats, semifinals); 26 July 2001 (final)
- Competitors: 45
- Winning time: 25.90 seconds

Medalists
gold medal	Inge de Bruijn	Netherlands
silver medal	Therese Alshammar	Sweden
bronze medal	Anna-Karin Kammerling	Sweden

The women's 50 metre butterfly event at the 2001 World Aquatics Championships took place 26 July. The heats and semifinals took place 25 July, with the final being held on 26 July.

== Records ==
Prior to the competition, the existing world and championship records were as follows:

World record	Inge de Bruijn (NED)	25.64	Sheffield, United Kingdom	26 May 2000
Championship record	New event			

The following record was established during the competition:

Date	Round	Name	Nation	Time	Record
25 July	Heat 5	Natalie Coughlin	United States	26.52	CR
25 July	Semifinal 1	Inge de Bruijn	Netherlands	26.10	CR
26 July	Final	Inge de Bruijn	Netherlands	25.90	CR

== Results ==
=== Heats ===
Rank	Name	Nationality	Time	Notes
1	Natalie Coughlin	United States	26.52	Q, CR
2	Inge de Bruijn	Netherlands	26.63	Q
3	Karen Egdal	Denmark	26.89	Q
4	Petria Thomas	Australia	27.01	Q
5	Vered Borochovski	Israel	27.02	Q
6	Anna-Karin Kammerling	Sweden	27.05	Q
7	Junko Onishi	Japan	27.11	Q
8	Ruan Yi	China	27.16	Q
9	Therese Alshammar	Sweden	27.19	Q
10	Alison Sheppard	United Kingdom	27.33	Q
11	Fabienne Dufour	Belgium	27.39	Q
12	Natalia Soutiagina	Russia	27.40	Q
13	Otylia Jędrzejczak	Poland	27.47	Q
14	Alena Popchanka	Belarus	27.51	Q
15	Urska Slapsak	Slovenia	27.53	Q
16	Mary Descenza	United States	27.54	Q
17	Julia Ham	Australia	27.61	
18	Judith Draxler	Austria	27.64	
19	Chantal Groot	Netherlands	27.84	
20	Inna Yaitskaya	Russia	27.88	
21	Anna Kopatchenia	Belarus	28.04	
22	Angela San Juan	Spain	28.04	
23	Leah Martindale	Barbados	28.27	
24	Yuko Nakanishi	Japan	28.32	
25	Sophia Skou	Denmark	28.42	
26	Tine Bossuyt	Belgium	28.46	
27	Audrey Lacroix	Canada	28.47	
28	Sharntelle McLean	Trinidad and Tobago	29.00	
29	Julie Douglas	Ireland	29.02	
30	Shim Min-Ji	South Korea	29.10	
31	Ayse Diker	Turkey	29.15	
32	Natalia Roubina	Cyprus	29.42	
33	Jacqueline Lim	Singapore	29.63	
34	Xenavee Pangelinan	Northern Mariana Islands	29.75	
35	Yang Chin-Kuei	Chinese Taipei	29.82	
36	Sung Yi-Chieh	Chinese Taipei	29.85	
37	Weng Tong Cheong	Macau	30.55	
38	Ayeisha Collymore	Trinidad and Tobago	31.36	
39	Nicole Hayes	Palau	31.81	
40	Wai Man Lam	Macau	32.17	
41	Khadija Ciss	Senegal	32.34	
42	Xenia Peni	Papua New Guinea	32.53	
43	Lasm Quissoh Genevieve Meledje	Ivory Coast	32.75	
44	Monika Bakale	Republic of the Congo	34.32	
45	Amanda Onyango	Kenya	35.46	

=== Semifinals ===
Rank	Name	Nationality	Time	Notes
1	Inge de Bruijn	Netherlands	26.10	Q, CR
2	Therese Alshammar	Sweden	26.18	Q
3	Anna-Karin Kammerling	Sweden	26.56	Q
4	Natalie Coughlin	United States	26.64	Q
5	Petria Thomas	Australia	26.78	Q
6	Karen Egdal	Denmark	26.87	Q
7	Otylia Jędrzejczak	Poland	27.05	Q
8	Ruan Yi	China	27.10	Q
9	Urska Slapsak	Slovenia	27.12	
10	Alison Sheppard	United Kingdom	27.15	
11	Junko Onishi	Japan	27.17	
12	Mary Descenza	United States	27.18	
12	Vered Borochovski	Israel	27.18	
14	Natalia Soutiagina	Russia	27.46	
15	Fabienne Dufour	Belgium	27.49	
16	Alena Popchanka	Belarus	27.69	

=== Final ===
Rank	Name	Nationality	Time	Notes
1st place, gold medalist(s)	Inge de Bruijn	Netherlands	25.90	CR
2nd place, silver medalist(s)	Therese Alshammar	Sweden	26.18	
3rd place, bronze medalist(s)	Anna-Karin Kammerling	Sweden	26.45	
4	Natalie Coughlin	United States	26.70	
5	Petria Thomas	Australia	26.91	
6	Otylia Jędrzejczak	Poland	27.02	
7	Karen Egdal	Denmark	27.03	
8	Ruan Yi	China	27.19	
