= 1999 Pan Pacific Swimming Championships – Women's 100 metre breaststroke =

Women's 100 metre freestyle at the 1999 Pan Pacific Swimming Championships
- Venue: Sydney International Aquatic Centre
- Dates: August 23, 1999 (heats & semifinals); August 24, 1999 (final)
- Competitors: 18 from 8 nations
- Winning time: 1:07.08

Medalists
| gold medal | Penelope Heyns | South Africa |
| silver medal | Megan Quann | United States |
| bronze medal | Kristy Kowal | United States |

The women's 100 metre breaststroke competition at the 1999 Pan Pacific Swimming Championships took place on August 23–24 at the Sydney International Aquatic Centre. The last champion was Samantha Riley of AUS.

This race consisted of two lengths of the pool, both lengths being in breaststroke.

== Records ==
Prior to this competition, the existing world and Pan Pacific records were as follows:

| World record | Penelope Heyns (RSA) | 1:06.95 | Los Angeles, United States | July 18, 1999 |
| Pan Pacific Championships record | Samantha Riley (AUS) | 1:07.81 | Fukuoka, Japan | August 11, 1997 |

== Results ==
All times are in minutes and seconds.

| KEY: | q | Fastest non-qualifiers | Q | Qualified | CR | Championships record | NR | National record | PB | Personal best | SB | Seasonal best |

=== Heats ===
The first round was held on August 23.

| Rank | Name | Nationality | Time | Notes |
|---|---|---|---|---|
| 1 | Penelope Heyns | South Africa | 1:06.52 | Q, WR |
| 2 | Megan Quann | United States | 1:09.02 | Q |
| 3 | Samantha Riley | Australia | 1:09.13 | Q |
| 4 | Kristy Kowal | United States | 1:09.55 | Q |
| 5 | Sarah Poewe | South Africa | 1:09.76 | Q |
| 6 | Tarnee White | Australia | 1:10.34 | Q |
| 7 | Caroline Hildreth | Australia | 1:10.95 | Q |
| 8 | Li Wei | China | 1:11.07 | Q |
| 9 | Masami Tanaka | Japan | 1:11.08 | Q |
| 10 | Catherine Street | United States | 1:11.25 | Q |
| 11 | Ashley Roby | United States | 1:11.43 | Q |
| 12 | Lauren van Oosten | Canada | 1:11.65 | Q |
| 13 | Fumiko Kawanabe | Japan | 1:12.03 | Q |
| 14 | Ayumi Shirata | Japan | 1:12.08 | Q |
| 15 | Nadine Neumann | Australia | 1:12.33 | Q |
| 16 | Jolie Workman | New Zealand | 1:12.38 | Q |
| 17 | Kye Yoon-Hee | South Korea | 1:13.87 | |
| 18 | Megan McMahon | Australia | 1:15.28 | |

=== Semifinals ===
The semifinals were held on August 23.

| Rank | Name | Nationality | Time | Notes |
|---|---|---|---|---|
| 1 | Penelope Heyns | South Africa | 1:06.99 | Q |
| 2 | Kristy Kowal | United States | 1:08.62 | Q |
| 3 | Megan Quann | United States | 1:09.16 | Q |
| 4 | Masami Tanaka | Japan | 1:09.61 | Q |
| 5 | Samantha Riley | Australia | 1:09.72 | Q |
| 6 | Tarnee White | Australia | 1:09.91 | Q |
| 7 | Sarah Poewe | South Africa | 1:10.08 | Q |
| 8 | Caroline Hildreth | Australia | 1:10.36 | |
| 9 | Lauren van Oosten | Canada | 1:10.61 | Q |
| 10 | Fumiko Kawanabe | Japan | 1:10.88 | |
| 11 | Ayumi Shirata | Japan | 1:11.17 | |
| 12 | Ashley Roby | United States | 1:11.27 | |
| 13 | Catherine Street | United States | 1:11.50 | |
| 14 | Li Wei | China | 1:11.59 | |
| 15 | Jolie Workman | New Zealand | 1:11.88 | |
| 16 | Nadine Neumann | Australia | 1:11.89 | |

=== Final ===
The final was held on August 24.

| Rank | Lane | Nationality | Time | Notes |
|---|---|---|---|---|
| 1st place, gold medalist(s) | Penelope Heyns | South Africa | 1:07.08 | |
| 2nd place, silver medalist(s) | Megan Quann | United States | 1:08.54 | |
| 3rd place, bronze medalist(s) | Kristy Kowal | United States | 1:08.56 | |
| 4 | Samantha Riley | Australia | 1:09.21 | |
| 5 | Sarah Poewe | South Africa | 1:09.30 | |
| 6 | Masami Tanaka | Japan | 1:09.31 | |
| 7 | Tarnee White | Australia | 1:10.12 | |
| 8 | Lauren van Oosten | Canada | 1:10.91 | |
