= 1999 Pan Pacific Swimming Championships – Women's 200 metre breaststroke =

Women's 200 metre freestyle at the 1999 Pan Pacific Swimming Championships
- Venue: Sydney International Aquatic Centre
- Dates: August 25, 1999 (heats & semifinals); August 26, 1999 (final)
- Competitors: 22 from 8 nations
- Winning time: 2:23.64

Medalists
gold medal	Penelope Heyns	South Africa
silver medal	Kristy Kowal	United States
bronze medal	Sarah Poewe	South Africa

The women's 200 metre breaststroke competition at the 1999 Pan Pacific Swimming Championships took place on August 25–26 at the Sydney International Aquatic Centre. The last champion was Samantha Riley of Australia.

This race consisted of four lengths of the pool, all in breaststroke.

== Records ==
Prior to this competition, the existing world and Pan Pacific records were as follows:

World record	Penelope Heyns (RSA)	2:24.51	Los Angeles, United States	July 17, 1999
Pan Pacific Championships record	Samantha Riley (AUS)	2:24.81	Atlanta, United States	August 13, 1995

== Results ==
All times are in minutes and seconds.

KEY:	q	Fastest non-qualifiers	Q	Qualified	CR	Championships record	NR	National record	PB	Personal best	SB	Seasonal best

=== Heats ===
The first round was held on August 25.

Rank	Name	Nationality	Time	Notes
1	Penelope Heyns	South Africa	2:24.61	Q, CR
2	Kristy Kowal	United States	2:27.90	Q
3	Samantha Riley	Australia	2:29.43	Q
4	Sarah Poewe	South Africa	2:29.73	Q
5	Masami Tanaka	Japan	2:29.94	Q
6	Catherine Street	United States	2:30.39	Q
7	Madeleine Crippen	United States	2:31.08	Q
8	Caroline Hildreth	Australia	2:31.52	Q
9	Ayumi Shirata	Japan	2:31.98	Q
10	Fumiko Kawanabe	Japan	2:33.14	Q
11	Tarnee White	Australia	2:33.56	Q
12	Nadine Neumann	Australia	2:34.01	Q
13	Megan Quann	United States	2:35.13	Q
14	Ashley Roby	United States	2:36.67	
15	Jolie Workman	New Zealand	2:37.07	Q
16	Lauren van Oosten	Canada	2:37.35	Q
17	Kye Yoon-Hee	South Korea	2:37.57	Q
18	Elizabeth Warden	Canada	2:37.96	
19	Megan McMahon	Australia	2:38.49	
20	Carissa Thompson	New Zealand	2:48.37	
21	Ziada Jardine	South Africa	2:49.16	
22	Lin Fang-Tzu	Chinese Taipei	2:49.52	

=== Semifinals ===
The semifinals were held on August 25.

Rank	Name	Nationality	Time	Notes
1	Penelope Heyns	South Africa	2:24.42	Q, WR
2	Kristy Kowal	United States	2:26.11	Q
3	Sarah Poewe	South Africa	2:28.41	Q
4	Samantha Riley	Australia	2:28.47	Q
4	Masami Tanaka	Japan	2:28.47	Q
6	Ayumi Shirata	Japan	2:29.62	Q
7	Catherine Street	United States	2:29.96	Q
8	Fumiko Kawanabe	Japan	2:30.21	
9	Madeleine Crippen	United States	2:30.66	
10	Caroline Hildreth	Australia	2:30.91	Q
11	Nadine Neumann	Australia	2:33.52	
12	Megan Quann	United States	2:33.92	
13	Tarnee White	Australia	2:34.11	
14	Lauren van Oosten	Canada	2:34.34	
15	Jolie Workman	New Zealand	2:36.70	
16	Kye Yoon-Hee	South Korea	2:38.60	

=== Final ===
The final was held on August 26.

Rank	Lane	Nationality	Time	Notes
1st place, gold medalist(s)	Penelope Heyns	South Africa	2:23.64	WR
2nd place, silver medalist(s)	Kristy Kowal	United States	2:25.52	
3rd place, bronze medalist(s)	Sarah Poewe	South Africa	2:25.90	
4	Samantha Riley	Australia	2:28.75	
5	Masami Tanaka	Japan	2:29.46	
6	Catherine Street	United States	2:30.00	
7	Ayumi Shirata	Japan	2:30.14	
8	Caroline Hildreth	Australia	2:31.11	
