= 2006 Pan Pacific Swimming Championships – Women's 100 metre breaststroke =

Women's 100 metre backstroke at the 2006 Pan Pacific Swimming Championships
- Venue: Saanich Commonwealth Place
- Dates: August 18, 2006 (heats & finals)
- Competitors: 20 from 11 nations
- Winning time: 1:07.56

Medalists
gold medal	Tara Kirk	United States
silver medal	Megan Jendrick	United States
bronze medal	Sarah Katsoulis	Australia

The women's 100 metre breaststroke competition at the 2006 Pan Pacific Swimming Championships took place on August 18 at the Saanich Commonwealth Place. The last champion was Amanda Beard of US.

This race consisted of two lengths of the pool, both lengths being in breaststroke.

== Records ==
Prior to this competition, the existing world and Pan Pacific records were as follows:

World record	Leisel Jones (AUS)	1:05.09	Melbourne, Australia	March 20, 2006
Pan Pacific Championships record	Penny Heyns (RSA)	1:06.52	Sydney, Australia	August 26, 1999

== Results ==
All times are in minutes and seconds.

KEY:	q	Fastest non-qualifiers	Q	Qualified	CR	Championships record	NR	National record	PB	Personal best	SB	Seasonal best

=== Heats ===
The first round was held on August 18, at 10:27.

Rank	Heat	Lane	Name	Nationality	Time	Notes
1	2	4	Tara Kirk	United States	1:07.05	QA
2	1	4	Megan Jendrick	United States	1:07.09	QA
3	3	4	Jessica Hardy	United States	1:07.12	QA
4	3	3	Sarah Katsoulis	Australia	1:08.67	QA
5	3	5	Suzaan Van Biljon	South Africa	1:09.93	QA
6	2	5	Asami Kitagawa	Japan	1:09.67	QA
7	1	5	Yoshimi Miwa	Japan	1:10.34	QA
8	2	6	Lisa Blackburn	Canada	1:10.43	?
8	3	6	Jillian Tyler	Canada	1:10.43	?
10	3	2	Jung Seul-Ki	South Korea	1:10.50	QB
11	2	2	Back Su-Yeon	South Korea	1:11.05	QB
12	2	7	Chelsey Salli	Canada	1:11.49	QB
13	1	7	Siow Yi Ting	Malaysia	1:11.72	QB
14	1	6	Annabelle Carey	New Zealand	1:11.76	QB
15	3	7	Helen Pitchik	Canada	1:11.87	QB
16	1	3	Chen Huijia	China	1:12.20	QB
17	2	3	Sun Ye	China	1:12.41	
18	1	2	Kathleen Stoody	Canada	1:13.24	
19	2	1	Suen Ka Yi	Hong Kong	1:14.72	
20	3	1	Lin Ting-Wei	Chinese Taipei	1:16.14	

=== B Final ===
The B final was held on August 18, at 18:34.

Rank	Lane	Name	Nationality	Time	Notes
9	4	Jessica Hardy	United States	1:06.43	CR
10	5	Jung Seul-Ki	South Korea	1:10.03	
11	3	Back Su-Yeon	South Korea	1:10.51	
12	7	Annabelle Carey	New Zealand	1:10.66	
13	6	Chelsey Salli	Canada	1:11.58	
14	2	Siow Yi Ting	Malaysia	1:11.70	
15	1	Chen Huijia	China	1:11.87	
16	8	Sun Ye	China	1:12.06	

=== A Final ===
The A final was held on August 18, at 18:34.

Rank	Lane	Name	Nationality	Time	Notes
1st place, gold medalist(s)	4	Tara Kirk	United States	1:07.56	
2nd place, silver medalist(s)	5	Megan Jendrick	United States	1:07.58	
3rd place, bronze medalist(s)	3	Sarah Katsoulis	Australia	1:08.12	
4	6	Suzaan Van Biljon	South Africa	1:08.47	
5	2	Asami Kitagawa	Japan	1:09.70	
6	7	Yoshimi Miwa	Japan	1:09.89	
7	8	Jillian Tyler	Canada	1:10.19	
8	1	Lisa Blackburn	Canada	1:10.37	
