= Junko Onishi =

Junko Onishi may refer to:

- Junko Onishi (swimmer)
- Junko Onishi (musician)
