= Swimming at the 2010 Commonwealth Games – Women's 200 metre breaststroke =

The Women's 200 metre breaststroke event at the 2010 Commonwealth Games took place on 6 October 2010, at the SPM Swimming Pool Complex.

Three heats were held, with both containing the seven swimmers. The heat in which a swimmer competed did not formally matter for advancement, as the swimmers with the top eight times from the entire field qualified for the finals.

== Heats ==
=== Heat 1 ===
Rank	Lane	Name	Nationality	Time	Notes
1	4	Sarah Katsoulis	Australia	02:28.29	Q
2	5	Stacey Tadd	England	02:28.75	Q
3	3	Kerry Buchan	Scotland	02:31.05	Q
4	6	Chia Kong	Malaysia	02:39.03	
5	2	Jessica Stephenson	Guyana	02:49.56	

=== Heat 2 ===
Rank	Lane	Name	Nationality	Time	Notes
1	4	Annamay Pierse	Canada	02:27.74	Q
2	5	Tessa Wallace	Australia	02:28.89	Q
3	3	Kate Hutchinson	England	02:34.08	
4	6	Sycerika McMahon	Northern Ireland	02:36.34	
5	2	Danielle Beaubrun	Saint Lucia	02:45.70	
6	7	Raghavi Manipal	India	02:55.20	

=== Heat 3 ===
Rank	Lane	Name	Nationality	Time	Notes
1	4	Leisel Jones	Australia	02:28.57	Q
2	5	Martha McCabe	Canada	02:28.85	Q
3	3	Hannah Miley	Scotland	02:32.04	Q
4	6	Alia Atkinson	Jamaica	02:34.32	
5	2	Yen Loh	Malaysia	02:41.77	
6	7	Poorva Shetye	India	02:55.44	

== Final ==
Rank	Lane	Name	Nationality	Time	Notes
1st place, gold medalist(s)	3	Leisel Jones	Australia	02:25.38	
2nd place, silver medalist(s)	7	Tessa Wallace	Australia	02:25.60	
3rd place, bronze medalist(s)	5	Sarah Katsoulis	Australia	02:25.92	
4	2	Martha McCabe	Canada	02:26.46	
5	4	Annamay Pierse	Canada	02:27.21	
6	6	Stacey Tadd	England	02:28.48	
7	8	Hannah Miley	Scotland	02:30.20	
8	1	Kerry Buchan	Scotland	02:31.18	
