= Tessa Wallace =

Australian swimmer

Personal information
- Full name: Tessa Clare Wallace
- Nickname: "Tess"
- National team: Australia
- Born: 9 September 1993 (age 32) Buderim, Queensland
- Height: 1.72 m (5 ft 8 in)
- Weight: 59 kg (130 lb)

Sport
- Sport: Swimming
- Strokes: Breaststroke
- Club: Pelican Waters Caloundra
- Coach: John Wallace
Medal record
Women's swimming
Representing Australia
Commonwealth Games
Silver medal – second place	2010 Delhi	200 m breaststroke

Tessa Clare Wallace (born 9 September 1993) represented Australia at the 2010 Commonwealth Games in Delhi, India, her debut into major international meets. Wallace's only Commonwealth Games race, the 200-metre breaststroke, was held on Wednesday 6 October. After a solid heat she qualified 6th for the final, where she came second to ex-world record-holder and fellow Australian, Leisel Jones. Not far behind Tessa, Sarah Katsoulis finished 3rd, completing an Australia sweep of gold, silver and bronze medals.

On 20 March 2012, Wallace qualified for her first Olympic Games. At the 2012 Summer Olympics in London, she advanced to the semifinals of the women's 200-metre breaststroke, and finished with the 15th-best time overall.
