= Karen Egdal =

Danish swimmer (born 1978)

Personal information
- Born: 15 February 1978 (age 48) Tommerup, Denmark

Sport
- Sport: Swimming
- Club: Nyborg Svømmeklub
Medal record
Women's swimming
Representing Denmark
European Championships (LC)
Silver medal – second place	2000 Helsinki	50 m butterfly
European Championships (SC)
Silver medal – second place	2000 Valencia	50 m butterfly

Karen Egdal (born 15 February 1978) is a Danish former swimmer who won two silver medals in the 50 m butterfly event at the European championships in 2000. She also competed at the 1996 Summer Olympics in the 4×100 m freestyle relay. She retired from competitive swimming in 2003.
