= Erin Phenix =

American swimmer

Personal information
- Full name: Erin Ashley Phenix
- National team: United States
- Born: March 1, 1981 (age 45) Cincinnati, Ohio, U.S.
- Height: 5 ft 10 in (1.78 m)
- Weight: 139 lb (63 kg)

Sport
- Sport: Swimming
- Strokes: Freestyle
- College team: University of Texas
Medal record
Women's swimming
Representing the United States
Olympic Games
Gold medal – first place	2000 Sydney	4×100 m freestyle
World Championships (LC)
Silver medal – second place	2001 Fukuoka	4×100 m freestyle
Silver medal – second place	2001 Fukuoka	4×100 m medley

Erin Ashley Phenix (born March 1, 1981) is an American former competition swimmer who won a gold medal at the 2000 Summer Olympics.

== Early life ==
Phenix was raised in Greenhills, Ohio, a suburb of Cincinnati, by her mother, Laurie. She swam for the Cincinnati Marlins. At Ursuline Academy, she won the state championship as part of the 200 yard freestyle relay team. The next year, she earned individual state championships in both the 50 and 100 yard freestyle, while participating in the championships relay teams at both 200 and 400 yard distances. In her final year at Ursuline, she would repeat as champion in those four races, and be named the GGCL swimmer of the year, and The Cincinnati Enquirer "swimmer of the year".

== Texas and the Olympics ==
In 1999, Phenix enrolled at the University of Texas at Austin on an athletic scholarship. At the U.S. Olympic Trials on August 14, 2000, she placed sixth in the 100-meter freestyle, earning a spot on the 4×100 metre relay squad in Sydney. Her mother, Laurie, was working two jobs at the time, and could not afford the trip to Australia, so her friends and neighbours worked together to raise the $3,500 for her to go to Sydney. Their efforts were rewarded, as in Sydney, Phenix swam in the preliminary heat, and when the U.S. team won the finals, she was awarded a gold medal.

The next year, Phenix won two silver medals at the 2001 World Aquatics Championships in Fukuoka, in the 4×100-meter freestyle relay, and swimming the anchor freestyle leg in the 4×100-meter medley relay. Though she would swim at the Olympic Trials again in 2004, she failed to qualify for the Athens games, effectively ending her swimming career in international competitions.

== See also ==
- List of Olympic medalists in swimming (women)
- List of University of Texas at Austin alumni
- List of World Aquatics Championships medalists in swimming (women)
