= Ágnes Kovács =

Hungarian swimmer (born 1981)

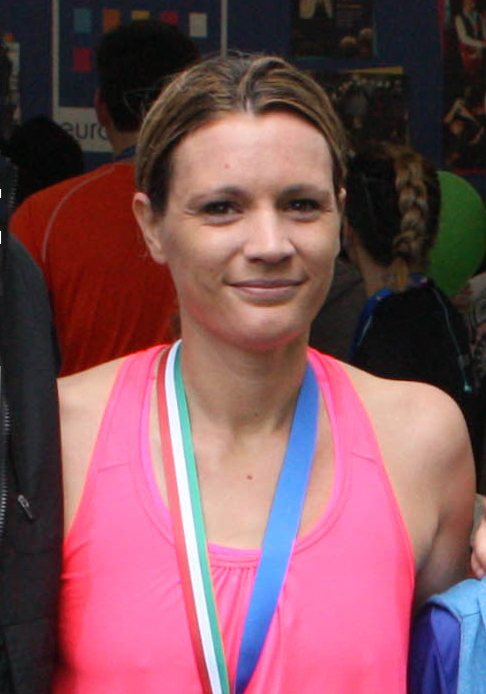
- Kovács in 2014

Personal information
- Full name: Kovács Ágnes
- National team: Hungary
- Born: 13 July 1981 (age 44) Budapest, Hungary
- Height: 1.78 m (5 ft 10 in)
- Weight: 63 kg (139 lb)

Sport
- Sport: Swimming
- Strokes: Breaststroke, medley
- Club: Budapesti Spartacus Sport Club
- College team: Arizona State University (USA)
- Coach: Mike Chasson (USA)
Medal record
Representing Hungary
Olympic Games
Gold medal – first place	2000 Sydney	200 m breaststroke
Bronze medal – third place	1996 Atlanta	200 m breaststroke
World Championships (LC)
Gold medal – first place	1998 Perth	200 m breaststroke
Gold medal – first place	2001 Fukuoka	200 m breaststroke
Bronze medal – third place	2001 Fukuoka	100 m breaststroke
European Championships (LC)
Silver medal – second place	1995 Vienna	4×100 m medley
Bronze medal – third place	1995 Vienna	100 m breaststroke
Gold medal – first place	1997 Seville	100 m breaststroke
Gold medal – first place	1997 Seville	200 m breaststroke
Gold medal – first place	1999 Istanbul	50 m breaststroke
Gold medal – first place	1999 Istanbul	100 m breaststroke
Gold medal – first place	1999 Istanbul	200 m breaststroke
Gold medal – first place	2000 Helsinki	50 m breaststroke
Gold medal – first place	2000 Helsinki	100 m breaststroke
Silver medal – second place	2000 Helsinki	200 m breaststroke
Bronze medal – third place	2006 Budapest	50 m breaststroke
Bronze medal – third place	2006 Budapest	100 m breaststroke
Bronze medal – third place	2006 Budapest	200 m breaststroke
European Championships (SC)
Silver medal – second place	1999 Lisbon	50 m breaststroke
Silver medal – second place	1999 Lisbon	100 m breaststroke
Silver medal – second place	1999 Lisbon	200 m breaststroke
Bronze medal – third place	2002 Riesa	100 m breaststroke

Ágnes Kovács (born 13 July 1981) is a Hungarian swimmer who competed at the 1996, 2000 and 2004 Olympics. In 2000, she won the 200 m breaststroke and set the Hungary records in the 100 m and 200 m breaststrokes events (1:07.79 and 2:24.03). As of 2014, these records still stand. She won a bronze medal in the 200 m breaststroke at the 1996 Olympics and placed fifth in 2004; in 2004 she also finished fourth in the 200 m individual medley event.

Kovács learned to swim aged two and a half years and started to train seriously at nine. Aged fourteen, she became a European Junior champion in the 100 yard breaststroke, and next year won an Olympic medal. From 1995 through 2007 she won 17 medals at European championships and 53 Hungarian titles. She was named Hungarian Sportswoman of the Year in four consecutive years, from 1997 to 2000. In 2014, she was inducted into the International Swimming Hall of Fame.

Kovács lives with her husband and son in Hungary. She is a PhD student at the Faculty of Physical Education and Sports Sciences of Semmelweis University.

== Awards ==
- Masterly youth athlete: 1995, 1996
- Cross of Merit of the Republic of Hungary – Silver Cross (1996)
- Best Hungarian Junior Athlete of the Year (Telesport) (1): 1996
- Hungarian swimmer of the Year (7): 1997, 1998, 1999, 2000, 2001, 2004, 2006
- Hungarian Sportswoman of the Year (4) – votes of sports journalists: 1997, 1998, 1999, 2000
- Swimming World Magazine – European Swimmer of the Year (2): 1997, 1998
- Order of Merit of the Republic of Hungary – Officer's Cross (2000)
- Honorary Citizen of Kőbánya (2001)
- Presidential recognition (2004)
- Budapest Pro Urbe award (2006)
- Member of International Swimming Hall of Fame (2014)
- Honorary Citizen of Budapest (2014)
- Arizona State University Hall of Fame (2015)

Awards
Preceded by Krisztina Egerszegi	Hungarian Sportswoman of The Year; 1997–2000	Succeeded by Gyöngyi Likerecz
Preceded by Michelle Smith	European Swimmer of the Year; 1997–1998	Succeeded by Inge de Bruijn
