= Nadine Neumann =

Australian swimmer (born 1975)

Personal information
- Full name: Nadine Bernadette Neumann
- Nickname: Wobbles
- National team: Australia
- Born: 3 December 1975 (age 50) Sydney, New South Wales
- Height: 1.66 m (5 ft 5 in)
- Weight: 58 kg (128 lb)

Sport
- Sport: Swimming
- Strokes: Breaststroke
- Club: Ryde-Carlile Swimming Club
Medal record
Women's swimming
Representing Australia
Pan Pacific Championships
Bronze medal – third place	1997 Fukuoka	4×100 m freestyle
Bronze medal – third place	1997 Fukuoka	4×200 m freestyle
Summer Universiade
Silver medal – second place	1995 Fukuoka	200 m breaststroke
Bronze medal – third place	1995 Fukuoka	100 m breaststroke

Nadine Bernadette Neumann (born 3 December 1975) is an Australian former breaststroke swimmer.

She overcame chronic fatigue syndrome at the age of 15, and was denied an Olympic birth in Barcelona because of a broken neck. She competed for Australia at the 1996 Summer Olympics in Atlanta, where she finished in sixth position, clocking 2:28.34 in the final of the 200-metre breaststroke. She captained the Australian Swimming Team at the 1998 Commonwealth Games and 1999 Pan Pacific Championships, competing in the 400-metre Individual Medley, 200-metre Butterfly and 800-metre Freestyle events as well as the breaststroke.

Upon retiring from competitive swimming, Neumann was a motivational speaker and worked in public relations and marketing, before becoming a high school teacher.

Neumann's memoir, An Olympic Story, won the 2009 IP Picks Award for Best Creative Non-Fiction and was published the same year. She has published a number of other short pieces and news articles and is currently working on a series of picture books, a middle-grade fantasy novel, and an historical fiction novel based on the lives of her two grandmothers.

She lives with her husband and four young children in the Hunter Valley, NSW.
