= Caroline Hildreth =

Australian swimmer who specialized in breaststroke events

Personal information
- Full name: Caroline May Hildreth
- National team: Australia
- Born: 22 February 1978 (age 48) Mackay, Queensland
- Height: 1.69 m (5 ft 7 in)
- Weight: 57 kg (126 lb)

Sport
- Sport: Swimming
- Strokes: Breaststroke
- Club: Australian Institute of Sport

Caroline May Hildreth (born 22 February 1978) is an Australian former competition swimmer who specialized in breaststroke events. She represented Australia at the 2000 Summer Olympics, and also trained for the Australian Institute of Sport, where she was coached by former British Olympic coach and longtime mentor Barry Prime.

Hildreth competed in the women's 200 m breaststroke at the 2000 Summer Olympics in Sydney. She finished in front of her teammate Rebecca Brown from the Olympic trials, with a FINA A-standard of 2:27.69. After posting a seventh-seeded time of 2:27.60 from the preliminary heats, Hildreth failed to advance to the top 8 final, as she finished her semifinal run with a ninth-place effort in 2:28.30.
