= Inna Yaitskaya =

Russian swimmer

Personal information
- Born: 18 August 1979 (age 46) Kuybyshev, Russian SFSR, Soviet Union
- Height: 1.71 m (5 ft 7 in)
- Weight: 62 kg (137 lb)

Sport
- Sport: Swimming
- Club: Ministry of Defense Sports Club
Medal record
Women's swimming
Representing Russia
European Championships
Bronze medal – third place	1997 Seville	4×100 m freestyle

Inna Yaitskaya (Russian: Инна Яицкая; born 18 August 1979) is a Russian swimmer who won a bronze medal at the 1997 European Aquatics Championships. She also competed at the 1996 and 2000 Summer Olympics in three relay events, but did not reach the finals.

She graduated from an Olympic boarding school in Samara.
