= Jillian Tyler =

Canadian swimmer

Personal information
- Full name: Jillian Tyler
- National team: Canada
- Born: September 5, 1988 (age 38) Didsbury, Alberta
- Height: 1.52 m (5 ft 0 in)
- Weight: 65 kg (143 lb)

Sport
- Sport: Swimming
- Strokes: Breaststroke
- Club: Cascade Swim Club

Jillian Tyler (born September 5, 1988) is a former competition swimmer who represented Canada in two consecutive Olympic Games. At the 2008 Summer Olympics in Beijing, and again at the 2012 Summer Olympics in London, Tyler competed in the 100-metre breaststroke and advanced to the semifinals before being eliminated.

Tyler played for Minnesota Golden Gophers in College, where she was a National Champion, winning the 100-yard breaststroke in 2011. Tyler was inducted into the M Club Hall of Fame by University of Minnesota in 2021.
