= Anastasiya Korolyova =

Uzbekistani swimmer (born 1983)

Personal information
- Full name: Anastasiya Korolyova
- National team: Uzbekistan
- Born: 26 June 1983 (age 43) Tashkent, Uzbek SSR, Soviet Union
- Height: 1.60 m (5 ft 3 in)
- Weight: 57 kg (126 lb)

Sport
- Sport: Swimming
- Strokes: Breaststroke

Anastasiya Korolyova (Uzbek: Анастасия Королëва; born June 26, 1983) is an Uzbek former swimmer, who specialized in breaststroke events. Korolyova competed only in the women's 200 m breaststroke at the 2000 Summer Olympics in Sydney. She achieved a FINA B-cut of 2:37.39 from the Russian Open Championships in Saint Petersburg. She participated in heat one against three other swimmers Isabel Ceballos of Colombia, Jenny Guerrero of the Philippines, and Russian import Olga Moltchanova of Kyrgyzstan. Coming from second at the initial turn, she dropped her pace on the final stretch to round out the field in a time of 2:43.23, the slowest in the heats. Korolyova failed to advance into the semifinals, as she placed thirty-fifth overall in the prelims.
