= Olga Bakaldina =

Russian swimmer

Personal information
- Born: 28 March 1985 (age 41) Volgograd, Russian SFSR, Soviet Union
- Height: 1.70 m (5 ft 7 in)
- Weight: 49 kg (108 lb)

Sport
- Sport: Swimming
- Club: Volga Club

Olga Bakaldina (Russian: Ольга Бакалдина; born 28 March 1985) is a Russian swimmer. She competed at the 2000 Summer Olympics in the 100 m and 200 m breaststroke and 4 × 100 m medley relay and finished in 17th, 5th and 9th place, respectively.
