= Kristy Kowal =

American swimmer (born 1978)

Personal information
- Full name: Kristina Ann Kowal
- Nickname: "Kristy"
- National team: United States
- Born: October 9, 1978 (age 47) Reading, Pennsylvania, U.S.
- Height: 6 ft 0 in (1.83 m)
- Weight: 146 lb (66 kg)
- Website: KristyKowal.com

Sport
- Sport: Swimming
- Strokes: Breaststroke
- Club: Athens Bulldog Swim Club
- College team: University of Georgia 2002
- Coach: Jack Bauerle (U. Georgia)
Medal record
Event	1st	2nd	3rd
Olympic Games	0	1	0
World Championships (LC)	2	2	0
Pan Pacific Championships	1	1	3
Total	3	4	3
Event	1st	2nd	3rd
200 m Breaststroke (OG/WC)	0	3	0
100m Breaststroke (OG/WC)	1	0	2
50m Breaststroke (OG/WC)	0	1	0
Women's 4 × 100 metre medley relay (OG/WC)	1	0	0
Total	2	4	2
Women's swimming
Representing United States
Olympic Games
Silver medal – second place	2000 Sydney	200 m breaststroke
World Championships (LC)
Gold medal – first place	1998 Perth	100 m breaststroke
Gold medal – first place	1998 Perth	4×100 m medley
Silver medal – second place	1998 Perth	200 m breaststroke
Silver medal – second place	2001 Fukuoka	50 m breaststroke
Pan Pacific Championships
Gold medal – first place	1997 Fukuoka	4×100 m medley
Silver medal – second place	1999 Sydney	200 m breaststroke
Bronze medal – third place	1997 Fukuoka	100 m breaststroke
Bronze medal – third place	1999 Sydney	100 m breaststroke
Bronze medal – third place	2002 Yokohama	200 m breaststroke

Kristina Ann Kowal (born October 9, 1978) is an American swimmer, Olympic medalist, World Champion, and former world record-holder. Kowal represented the United States at the 2000 Summer Olympics in Sydney, winning the silver medal in the 200-meter breaststroke.

== Early life and swimming ==
Kristy Kowal was born on October 9, 1978 in Reading, Pennsylvania, to Edward and Donna Kowal, and attended nearby Wilson High School in West Lawn. In the District 3 Championships at Wilson High in March, 1993, Kowal swam a 1:06.12 for the 100 breast stroke, a meet record, qualifying for the State Championships in Harrisburg. She seeded third in the 200-yard individual medley for the State Championships with a 2:08.47, also a District 3 meet record. In the PIAA Championships at Penn State, swimming for Wilson High in March, 1995, Kowal placed first in the 100-yard breaststroke with a time of 1:02.63, winning the state championship, and seeded first in the 200-yard IM with a time of 2:03.91.

In the summer of 1995, before her Senior year at Wilson High, Kowal attended the Central Penn Aquatics Summer swim program session. On July 27, 1997, Kowal broke the meet record at the Phillips 66 National Swimming Championships in the 100-meter breast stroke with a time of 1:08.80.

=== University of Georgia ===
Enrolling around the fall of 1997, Kowal helped her college team, the Georgia Bulldogs swimming and diving team of the University of Georgia (UGA), win two NCAA Division I Women's Swimming and Diving Championships. She was the NCAA swimmer of the year in 1999 and 2000. At the University of Georgia, Kowal was trained and mentored by Head Coach Jack Bauerle, and competed with top women swimmers, Stef Williams, a 2001 World Championships competitor, and 2000 Olympic gold medalist Courtney Shealey. In conference-wide competition, she was a 16-time Southeastern Conference champion for Georgia from 1997-2000.

She won eight NCAA titles and 10 U.S. Swimming national titles. During her college career she held 8 American and one world record. Kowal was the first American woman to break the one-minute barrier in the 100-yard breaststroke in 1998. While still in High School, Kowal broke a National Federation Record in the 100-yard breaststroke with a 1:01.47 at the District 3 Meet at Franklin and Marshall College in February,1996. In 2000, she was named NCAA Woman of the Year and was a recipient of the Today's Top VIII Award as a member of the Class of 2001, which honors eight senior student-athletes each year. She graduated from UGA in 2002 with a Bachelor of Science in Education (B.S.Ed). She holds a master's degree in elementary education.

=== International competition ===
She was the first American woman to win a world championship title in the 100-meter breaststroke on January 13, 1998 at the FINA World Championships in Perth, Australia in a close race with a time of 1:08.42. During her career she held 8 American Records, and one World Record. Kowal became a member of the United States Swimming Team in 1995 at the age of 16. She participated in the 1998 and 2001 World Championships, and won gold medals in 1998 in the medley relay and 100-metre breaststroke. At the 1998 World Championships, she also won a silver medal in the 200 metre breaststroke and won a silver medal in the 50 metre breaststroke at the 2001 World Championships. At the Pan Pacific Championships she won five medals from 1997-2002, capturing a gold medal in the medley relay in 1997.

== Olympics ==
She placed third and seventh in the 100 and 200-meter breastroke finals in the 1996 Atlanta Olympic trials, failing to make the team. She placed third in the 200-meter breaststroke at the 2004 Athens Olympic trials in Long Beach, California, and did not qualify for the team.

=== 2000 Sydney Olympic silver medal ===
Kowal missed out qualifying for the 2000 Olympic 100-meter trials, placing third by only .001 seconds, and requiring a second place to qualify. She performed well and qualified in the 200-meter U.S. breast stroke trials, however, swimming a U.S. record time of 2:15.8, the third fastest time in the history of the event.

Kowal's University of Georgia Coach Jack Bauerle was an Assistant Coach for the U.S. Olympic Women's swim team in 2000. At 21, Kowal represented the United States at the 2000 Summer Olympics in Sydney, winning the silver medal in the 200-meter breaststroke with a time of 2:24.56, finishing only .21 seconds behind Hungary's Agnes Kovacs. Kowal took an early lead and led through the first 100 meters, but Kovacs, who came from fifth place, bore down on Kowal and passed her in the final meters, taking the gold medal. American Amanda Beard, a 1996 Atlanta Olympic medalist, finished in third place taking the bronze medal.

By 2005, Kowal had retired from competitive swimming. She has served as an Elementary School Teacher in Pennsylvania, often in the Wilson school district where she grew up, and has stayed active in the swimming community by serving with Swim Across America, and the Mutual of Omaha Breakout! Swim Clinics. In 2015, she was a third grade teacher in the Wilson School district, and taught a swim clinic to the Colonial Clippers Swim team, an age-group team associated with the Colonial Golf and Tennis Club in greater Harrisburg.

=== Honors ===
Kowal was inducted into the Pennsylvania Swimming Hall of Fame in 2009, the National Polish-American Sports Hall of Fame in 2010, University of Georgia's Circle of Honor in 2012 and the Georgia Aquatic Hall of Fame in 2013.

== See also ==
- List of Olympic medalists in swimming (women)
- List of University of Georgia people
- List of World Aquatics Championships medalists in swimming (women)
- World record progression 4 × 100 metres medley relay
