= Agata Czaplicki =

Swiss swimmer

Personal information
- Full name: Agata Czaplicki
- National team: Switzerland
- Born: 22 October 1983 (age 42) Locarno, Switzerland
- Height: 1.67 m (5 ft 6 in)
- Weight: 57 kg (126 lb)

Sport
- Sport: Swimming
- Strokes: Breaststroke
- Club: Team Atlantide Agno

Agata Czaplicki (born 22 October 1983) is a Swiss former swimmer, who specialized in breaststroke events. She represented Switzerland, as a 16-year-old, at the 2000 Summer Olympics, and also held numerous national meet and age group records in a breaststroke double (both 100 and 200 m).

Czaplicki competed in a breaststroke double at the 2000 Summer Olympics in Sydney. She achieved FINA B-standards of 1:12.40 (100 m breaststroke) and 2:31.12 (200 m breaststroke) from the European Championships in Helsinki, Finland. On the second day of the Games, Czaplicki placed twenty-seventh in the 100 m breaststroke. Swimming in heat three, she came up with a spectacular swim on the final stretch to a third seed in 1:13.19, more than half a second (0.50) closer to her entry standard. Three days later, in the 200 m breaststroke, Czaplicki posted a time of 2:32.98 from the final of five heats, but finished outside the semifinals by 3.38 seconds with a twenty-second-place effort.
