= Jenny Guerrero =

Filipino swimmer (born 1984)

Personal information
- Full name: Jenny Rose Guerrero
- National team: Philippines
- Born: 10 October 1984 (age 41) Muntinlupa, Philippines
- Height: 1.60 m (5 ft 3 in)
- Weight: 48 kg (106 lb)

Sport
- Sport: Swimming
- Strokes: Breaststroke
- Club: Alabang Gators Swim Team
- Coach: Anthony Lozada
Medal record
Women's swimming
Representing the Philippines
Southeast Asian Games
Silver medal – second place	2001 Kuala Lumpur	100 m breaststroke
Bronze medal – third place	2001 Kuala Lumpur	200 m breaststroke

Jenny Rose Guerrero (born October 10, 1984) is a Filipino former swimmer, who specialized in breaststroke events. She represented the Philippines, as the youngest ever athlete of the squad (aged 14), at the 2000 Summer Olympics, in Sydney. She won two medals at the 2001 Southeast Asian Games in Kuala Lumpur, and later became a top 8 finalist at the 2002 Asian Games in Busan, South Korea before her official retirement in 2005.

== Career ==
Started her sporting career at the age of eight, Guerrero trained for the Alabang Gators Swim Team in Muntinlupa under her longtime coach and mentor Anthony Lozada, before she rose to a worldwide fame at the age of fourteen.

Guerrero competed in a breaststroke double at the 2000 Summer Olympics in Sydney. She achieved FINA B-standards of 1:13.04 (100 m breaststroke) and 2:36.90 (200 m breaststroke) from the Southeast Asian Games in Bandar Seri Begawan, Brunei. On the second day of the Games, Guerrero placed thirty-fifth in the 100 m breaststroke. Swimming in heat three, she struggled to keep her pace against seven other swimmers, and raced to the last seed in 1:15.14, more than two seconds below her entry standard. Three days later, in the 200 m breaststroke, Guerrero posted a time of 2:38.10 in heat one, but finished farther from the semifinal field with a thirty-first-place effort.

At the 2001 Southeast Asian Games in Kuala Lumpur, Malaysia, Guerrero held off a three-way challenge in the pool against host nation's Siow Yi Ting and Singapore's Nicolette Teo, but her relentless effort was worthy enough to take home the silver in the 100 m breaststroke (1:12.91, a fresh Filipino record) and bronze in the 200 m breaststroke (2:36.05).

Two years after her first worldwide debut, Guerrero competed at the 2002 Asian Games in Busan, South Korea, where she failed to medal in any of her individual events, finishing eighth in the 200 m breaststroke (2:37.26), and being disqualified for an illegal dolphin kick in the 100 m breaststroke.

== Personal ==
Guerrero is a graduate of University of the Philippines Diliman with a Bachelor of Science degree major in hotel and restaurant management (HRM). She is currently working as a head coach for the Bert Lozada Swim School in Quezon City.
