= Beatrice Câșlaru =

Romanian swimmer (born 1975)

Personal information
- Full name: Beatrice Nicoleta Câșlaru
- Nickname: "Biki"
- Nationality: Romania
- Born: 20 August 1975 (age 50) Brăila, Romania
- Height: 1.70 m (5 ft 7 in)
- Weight: 64 kg (141 lb)

Sport
- Sport: Swimming
- Strokes: Freestyle and medley
Medal record
Women's swimming
Representing Romania
Olympic Games
| Silver medal – second place | 2000 Sydney | 200 m medley |
| Bronze medal – third place | 2000 Sydney | 400 m medley |
World Championships (LC)
| Bronze medal – third place | 2001 Fukuoka | 400 m medley |
| Bronze medal – third place | 2003 Barcelona | 400 m medley |
European Championships (LC)
| Gold medal – first place | 2000 Helsinki | 200 m breaststroke |
| Gold medal – first place | 2000 Helsinki | 200 m medley |
| Gold medal – first place | 2000 Helsinki | 4×200 m freestyle |
| Silver medal – second place | 1991 Athens | 400 m freestyle |
| Silver medal – second place | 1991 Athens | 200 m breaststroke |
| Silver medal – second place | 1991 Athens | 200 m medley |
| Silver medal – second place | 1991 Athens | 400 m medley |
| Silver medal – second place | 1999 Istanbul | 200 m breaststroke |
| Silver medal – second place | 1999 Istanbul | 200 m medley |
| Silver medal – second place | 1999 Istanbul | 400 m medley |
| Silver medal – second place | 2000 Helsinki | 400 m medley |
| Bronze medal – third place | 1999 Istanbul | 4×200 m freestyle |
| Bronze medal – third place | 2000 Helsinki | 4×100 m medley |
| Bronze medal – third place | 2004 Madrid | 200 m medley |
| Bronze medal – third place | 2004 Madrid | 4×200 m freestyle |
European Championships (SC)
| Silver medal – second place | 1996 Rostock | 400 m medley |
Summer Universiade
| Silver medal – second place | 1999 Majorca | 400 m medley |

Beatrice Nicoleta Câșlaru, née Coadă, (20 August 1975 in Brăila) is a former medley swimmer from Romania, who competed in three consecutive Summer Olympics for her native country, starting in 1996. At her second Olympic appearance, in Sydney, Australia, she won a silver and a bronze medal.

Nicknamed Biki, she made her international debut at the 1991 European Aquatics Championships in Athens, Greece. Just like two other swimmers from Romania, Diana Mocanu and Camelia Potec, she comes from the town of Brăila.

== See also ==
- List of World Aquatics Championships medalists in swimming (women)
