= Junko Onishi (swimmer) =

Japanese swimmer (born 1974)

Personal information
- Born: 1974 (age 51–52)
Medal record
Women's swimming
Representing Japan
Olympic Games
Bronze medal – third place	2000 Sydney	4x100 m medley relay
World Championships (LC)
Bronze medal – third place	2001 Fukuoka	100 m butterfly
Summer Universiade
Silver medal – second place	1997 Catania	100 m butterfly

Junko Onishi (大西 順子, Onishi Junko; born October 18, 1974 in Hyōgo) is a former butterfly swimmer from Japan, who won the bronze medal in the 4 × 100 m medley relay at the 2000 Summer Olympics in Sydney, Australia. Her winning teammates in that race were Mai Nakamura, Masami Tanaka, and Sumika Minamoto.
