= Simone Weiler =

German swimmer (born 1978)

Personal information
- Born: 16 December 1978 (age 47) Speyer, West Germany
- Height: 1.73 m (5 ft 8 in)
- Weight: 60 kg (132 lb)

Sport
- Sport: Swimming
- Club: SV Nikar Heidelberg
Medal record
Swimming
Representing Germany
European Championships (LC)
Gold medal – first place	2002 Berlin	4×100 m medley
European Championships (SC)
Bronze medal – third place	2004 Vienna	100 m breaststroke
Bronze medal – third place	2005 Trieste	100 m breaststroke
Bronze medal – third place	2003 Dublin	200 m breaststroke

Simone Weiler (née Karn, 16 December 1978) is a German swimmer who won a gold medal in the 4×100 m medley relay at the 2002 European Aquatics Championships (50 m pool). She also won three bronze medals in breaststroke in 2003–2005 at short-course (25 m pool) European championships. She competed at the 2000 Summer Olympics in the 100 m breaststroke but failed to reach the final. Between 2001 and 2002 she won four national titles in breaststroke events. Around 2000–2001 she married and changed her last name from Karn to Weiler.

After retirement from senior swimming she competed in the masters category.
