= Qi Hui =

Chinese swimmer

QI Hui
Personal information
- Full name: Hui Qi
- Nationality: China
- Born: 13 January 1985 (age 41) Fuzhou, China

Sport
- Sport: Swimming
- Strokes: Breaststroke
Medal record
World Championships
Silver medal – second place	2001 Fukuoka	200m Breaststroke
Bronze medal – third place	2001 Fukuoka	200m IM
Bronze medal – third place	2003 Barcelona	200m Breaststroke
Short Course Worlds
Gold medal – first place	2002 Moscow	200m Breaststroke
Gold medal – first place	2006 Shanghai	200m Breaststroke
Gold medal – first place	2006 Shanghai	200m IM
Gold medal – first place	2006 Shanghai	400m IM
Bronze medal – third place	2002 Moscow	4 x 100 m medley
Summer Universiade
Gold medal – first place	2003 Daegu	200m Breaststroke
Gold medal – first place	2003 Daegu	4x200m Free Relay
Gold medal – first place	2005 Izmir	200m IM
Gold medal – first place	2005 Izmir	400m IM

Qi Hui (齐晖, born 13 January 1985 in Fuzhou, Fujian) is an Olympic and former world record holding breaststroke swimmer from China.

She held the world record in the long course women's 200 breaststroke from April 2001 – July 2004. She specializes in breaststroke, but is also an individual medley swimmer.

== History ==
Qi competed at the 1997 Chinese National Games, aged 12, where she placed 4th in the 200 breaststroke (2:30.77). She made her international debut at the 1998 Goodwill Games in New York. She won silver behind Japan's Masami Tanaka in the 200 breaststroke (2:28.44 to 2:28.71) at the 1998 Asian Games in Bangkok, where she was the youngest athlete in the Chinese delegation.

At the 1999 World Short Course Championships in Hong Kong, she placed 3rd behind Tanaka and South Africa's Olympic champion Penny Heyns in the 200 breaststroke (2:25.05). A few months later, she broke 1992 Olympic champion Kyoko Iwasaki's Asian record (long course) with 2:26.51. This ranked her 4th globally in 1999. Considered to be China's best hope for a swimming medal, in the 2000 Olympics in Sydney, Qi finished 0.01 second behind USA's Amanda Beard for 4th (2:25.35 to 2:25.36). Her time in the semifinal, 2:24.21, was a national record.

Qi set her first world record in January 2001 in Paris with 2:19.25 for the 200 breaststroke (short course), followed shortly by a 2:22.99 world record in the long course pool, breaking Penny Heyns' original mark by 0.65 sec. She won the 2001 East Asian Games in 2:25.33. At the 2001 World Championships in Fukuoka, she finished 2nd in the 200 breaststroke event behind Kovacs (2:24.90 to 2:25.09). She won a bronze in the 200 individual medley (2:12.46 personal best) and was 4th in the 400 individual medley (4:41.64). In the 2001 Chinese National Games, Qi was 2nd in the 400 individual medley after former world record holder Chen Yan (4:35.22 to 4:38.20) and 3rd in the 100 breast (1:09.12) behind Luo Xuejuan and Luo Nan.

In 2002, Qi swam a 2:23.74 200 breaststroke (fastest time of the year, and 3rd fastest all time) at the Chinese Nationals, won her first world title at the Short Course Worlds in Moscow (2:20.91 in the 200 breaststroke), and took home three golds (200 breaststroke: 2:24.01; 200 individual medley: 2:13.94 and 400 individual medley: 4:40.37) and 1 silver (100 breaststroke: 1:08.24) at the 2002 Asian Games in Busan, Korea in October. She broke her own 200 breast world record (short course) to 2:18.86 in December.

At the 2003 World Championships, Qi finished 3rd in the 200 breaststroke (2:25.78) behind USA's Amanda Beard (who won by tying Qi's world record of 2:22.99) and Australia's Leisel Jones (2:24.33, Commonwealth record). Qi was 4th in the 200 individual medley and 9th in the 400 individual medley.

Before the 2004 Olympics, Qi lost her (joint) world record to Leisel Jones, who swam a 2:22.96 in Brisbane, and this was followed by Amanda Beard's world record of 2:22.44 at the US Olympics Trials a few days later. At the 200 meter breastroke at the games, Qi was in 3rd place at the 150m mark, but finished 6th at 2:26.35. In the Olympics, Qi also entered the 100 breaststroke, but was disqualified in the final for an illegal underwater dolphin kick. Qi placed 29th in the 200 individual medley in 2:26.02. Qi competed in the 2004 World Short Course Championships in Indianapolis but did not win any medals.

Qi skipped the 2005 World Championships in Montreal to concentrate on the Chinese National Games in October, where she won the 200 breaststroke (2:24.14), 200 individual medley (2:12.17) and the 400 individual medley (4:38.24), and placed 2nd in the 100 breaststroke (in a personal best of 1:07.27). She won the 200 individual medley (2:09.33), 400 individual medley (4:34.28) and 200m breaststroke (2:20.72) at the 2006 World Short Course Championship in Shanghai. She won the same three events at the Doha Asian Games: 200 individual medley at 2:11.92; 400 individual medley at 4:38.31 and 200 breaststroke at 2:23.93. All times ranked among the top 4 globally in 2006.

At the 2007 World Championships, after having switched to a new training approach, she performed poorly in her two individual medley races in Melbourne. However, she made the semifinals in the 200 breaststroke.

She competed in the World Military Games in Hyderabad, India, in October 2007, where she won the 200 breaststroke (2:29.23) and took silver in the 100 meter breaststroke (1:09.52).

At the Good Luck Beijing 2008 Swimming China Open, held in the "WaterCube" (venue for 2008 Olympic swimming and diving competitions) in early February, she swam in the 200 individual medley (2:14.14), 100 breaststroke (1:08.22) and 200 breaststroke (2:27.11).

At the 2008 Olympics in Beijing she finished 13th in the 200 meter breaststroke and 20th in the 200 meter individual medley.

== See also ==
- China at the 2008 Summer Olympics

Records
Preceded by Penny Heyns	World Record Holder; Women's 200 Breaststroke; April 13, 2001 – July 10, 2004	Succeeded by Leisel Jones
