= Christin Petelski =

Canadian swimmer

Personal information
- Full name: Christin Petelski
- National team: Canada
- Born: December 29, 1977 (age 48) Nanaimo, British Columbia
- Height: 1.70 m (5 ft 7 in)
- Weight: 57 kg (126 lb)

Sport
- Sport: Swimming
- Strokes: Breaststroke
- Club: Island Swimming

Christin Petelski (born December 29, 1977) is a former competition swimmer and breaststroke specialist who represented Canada at two consecutive Summer Olympics in 1996 and 2000. At the 1996 Summer Olympics in Atlanta, Georgia, she finished eighth position in the final of the women's 200-metre breaststroke. Four years later at the 2000 Summer Olympics in Sydney, Australia, she advanced to the semifinals of the 100-metre and 200-metre breaststroke, finishing 10th and 13th, respectively. Petelski was also a member of the sixth-place Canadian team in the women's 4x100-metre medley relay at the 2000 Olympics.
