= Megan Jendrick =

American swimmer

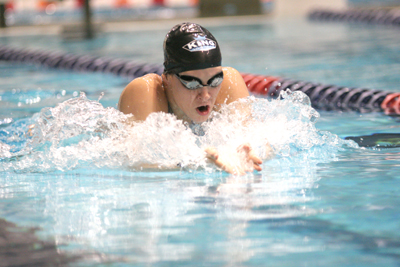
- Megan Jendrick in 2008

Personal information
- Full name: Megan M. Jendrick
- Nickname: "MJ"
- National team: United States
- Born: Megan M. Quann; January 15, 1984 (age 42) Tacoma, Washington, U.S.
- Height: 5 ft 7 in (170 cm)
- Weight: 140 lb (64 kg)

Sport
- Sport: Swimming
- Strokes: Breaststroke
- Coach: Nate Jendrick
Medal record
Women's swimming
Representing the United States
Olympic Games
Gold medal – first place	2000 Sydney	100 m breaststroke
Gold medal – first place	2000 Sydney	4×100 m medley
Silver medal – second place	2008 Beijing	4×100 m medley relay
World Championships (LC)
Silver medal – second place	2001 Fukuoka	4×100 m medley
Silver medal – second place	2007 Melbourne	200 m breaststroke
Pan Pacific Championships
Gold medal – first place	1999 Sydney	4×100 m medley
Silver medal – second place	1999 Sydney	100 m breaststroke
Silver medal – second place	2006 Victoria	100 m breaststroke
Summer Universiade
Gold medal – first place	2005 Izmir	50 m breaststroke
Gold medal – first place	2005 Izmir	100 m breaststroke
Gold medal – first place	2005 Izmir	4×100 m medley

Megan M. Jendrick (née Quann, born January 15, 1984) is an American former competition swimmer, former world record-holder, and fitness columnist. She won two gold medals at the 2000 Summer Olympics and a silver medal at the 2008 Summer Olympics. Jendrick set 27 American records and four world records in her swimming career. She is a 13-time national champion, ten-time U.S. Open champion, seven-time masters world record-holder, and fifteen-time U.S. Masters national record-holder. Jendrick is married to American author Nathan Jendrick.

== Career ==
Jendrick first made her mark on the swimming world in 1998. During the course of that year, she took 3rd in the 100-meter breaststroke at the national championships held in Clovis, California, and later captured her first national championship in that same event during the nationals held in Minneapolis, Minnesota. In Minnesota, she was presented the Phillips 66 Performance Award.

At the U.S. Open that same year, in College Station, Texas, Jendrick won both the 100 and 200-meter breaststrokes. In the 100-meter event, she broke the 50-meter American record at the 50-meter split of the race—a rare feat—and her final time of 1:07.14 broke the American record that had been held by Olympian Tracy Caulkins for 17 years. To round out her year, Jendrick would win a gold (400-meter medley relay) and a bronze (100-meter breaststroke) at the Goodwill Games in New York.

In 2000, Jendrick was the youngest medalist on the U.S. Olympic swim team and second-youngest athlete overall (only Michael Phelps was younger). Jendrick went on to win gold medals in the 100-meter breaststroke (setting an American record) and 4×100-meter medley relay (setting a World record), and subsequently she was featured on the cover of Sports Illustrated magazine, becoming one of a small number of women to be honored as such. Jendrick has additionally been featured on covers of newspapers such as The Seattle Times, The New York Times, and USA Today.

At the 2001 World Championships in Fukuoka, Japan, Jendrick earned a silver medal on the 4×100-meter medley relay.

After failing to make the 2004 Athens Olympic team, missing qualifying by eleven one-hundredths of a second, Jendrick retired from swimming. Shortly thereafter, she was inducted into the Pacific Northwest Swimming Hall of Fame, class of 2004.

After coming out of retirement, Jendrick was the star of the 2005 World University Games in Izmir, Turkey, winning three gold medals and setting two University Games records. At those games, she was the only American woman to capture individual gold in two events. Jendrick was only the second woman to swim the 100-yard breaststroke in under a minute and was also the second woman in history to swim the 100-yard breaststroke in under 59 seconds.

In 2006, Jendrick was the subject of a question on the December 6 episode of the game show Jeopardy!. The question for $1,600 was under the subject "12 Letter Words" and read, "In the 2000 Summer Olympics, the USA's Megan Quann swam the 100m in this event in 1:07.05 to win gold."

In 2007, Jendrick won the silver medal in the 200-meter breaststroke at the 12th FINA World Championships.

On July 1, 2008, Jendrick qualified for the 2008 U.S. Olympic team in the 100-meter breaststroke, eight years after winning gold in the event at the 2000 Summer Olympics in Sydney, Australia. With the disqualification of Jessica Hardy, who was dropped from the team after testing positive for a banned substance (clenbuterol), Jendrick was officially the winner of the event at the U.S. Olympic Trials. In Beijing, Jendrick silenced many critics by making the final of the 100-meter breaststroke—ultimately finishing in fifth place—and capturing a silver medal as part of the 4×100-meter medley relay. Competing under her married name Megan Jendrick (she competed as Megan Quann in 2000), she became only the third person to win Olympic swimming medals under two different names and just the second American to do so. The first was Eleanor Garatti (later Saville) in 1928 and 1932, the second was Libby Lenton (later Trickett) in 2004 and 2008.

On July 25, 2009, Jendrick set the 27th American record of her career, this time in unusual fashion. Taking out a 200-meter breaststroke final, she raced her first 50 in 30.40 seconds, beating the 30.63 record that had been held by Jessica Hardy since 2007.

In 2012, just seven months after giving birth to her first child, Jendrick competed at the U.S. Olympic Trials. In 2013, she swam at the U.S. National Championships, winning bronze in the 50-meter breaststroke. On September 24, 2013, Jendrick announced her retirement from international swimming.

== Personal ==
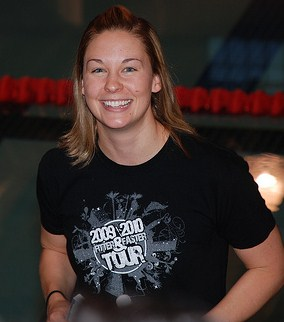
Megan Jendrick at a swim clinic.

Jendrick graduated from Emerald Ridge High School in Puyallup, Washington. Jendrick attended Pacific Lutheran University in Parkland, Washington, before enrolling at, and graduating from, Arizona State University.

In December 2004, Jendrick married author Nathan Jendrick. Jendrick is still often listed as Quann or Quann-Jendrick but she has said that her legal and professional name is Megan Jendrick and that the hyphenated version is not correct.

In 2006, Jendrick was honored as the female recipient of the Henry Iba Citizen Athlete Award, with the male honoree that year being former NFL quarterback Drew Bledsoe. She was also nominated that same year for a Golden Goggle Award, the highest honor outside of swimming an American aquatic athlete may receive. To date, she is a two-time nominee. From the Iba Award, Jendrick donated $10,000 to Children's Hospital in Seattle.

In late 2008, Jendrick began writing a weekly fitness question and answer column on the Advanced Research Press publication website, FitnessRxMag.com.

Late in 2011, Jendrick gave birth to a son named Daethan. In 2014, the Jendricks welcomed a daughter, Sydney.

In 2019, Jendrick was inducted to the Washington State Sports Hall of Fame.

Jendrick and her family live in Buckley, Washington.

== See also ==
- List of Olympic medalists in swimming (women)
- List of Pacific Lutheran University alumni
- List of World Aquatics Championships medalists in swimming (women)
- World record progression 4 × 100 metres medley relay
