= Luo Xuejuan =

Chinese swimmer (born 1984)

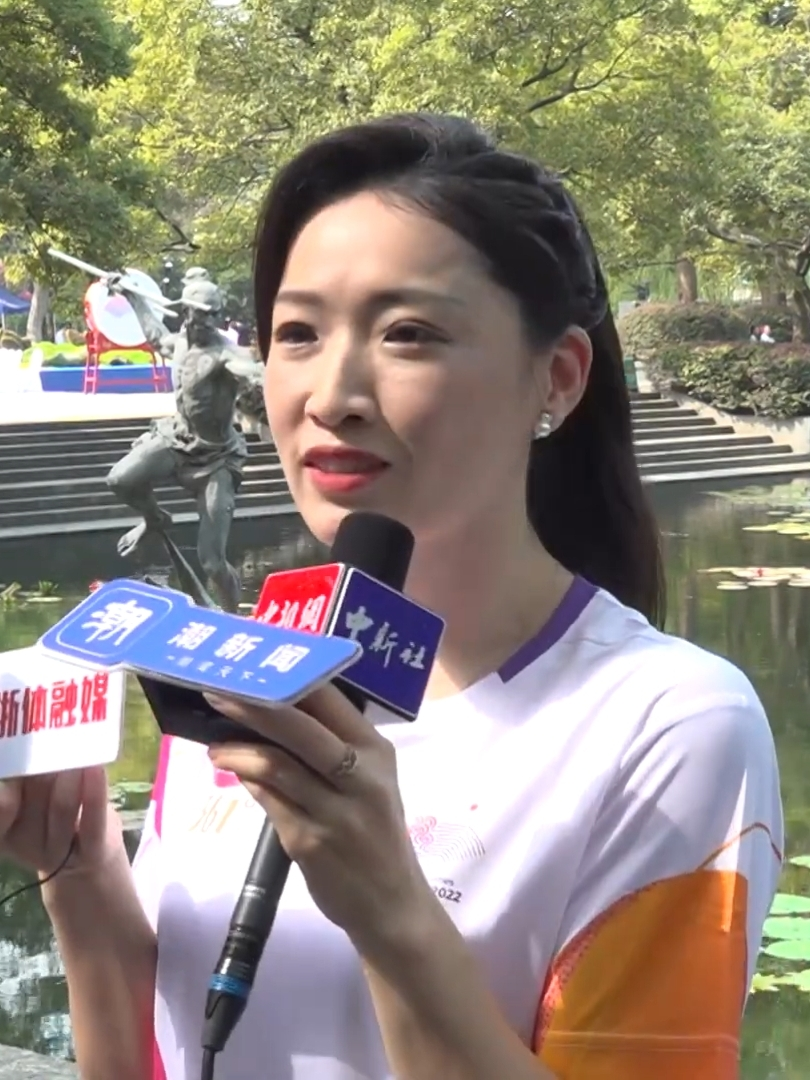
- Luo in 2023

Personal information
- Full name: 罗雪娟
- Nationality: China
- Born: January 26, 1984 (age 42) Hangzhou, Zhejiang
- Height: 1.67 m (5 ft 6 in)
- Weight: 64 kg (141 lb)

Sport
- Sport: Swimming
- Strokes: Breaststroke
- Club: Zhejiang
Medal record
Women's swimming
Representing China
Olympic Games
| Gold medal – first place | 2004 Athens | 100 m breaststroke |
World Championships (LC)
| Gold medal – first place | 2001 Fukuoka | 50 m breaststroke |
| Gold medal – first place | 2001 Fukuoka | 100 m breaststroke |
| Gold medal – first place | 2003 Barcelona | 50 m breaststroke |
| Gold medal – first place | 2003 Barcelona | 100 m breaststroke |
| Gold medal – first place | 2003 Barcelona | 4×100 m medley |
| Bronze medal – third place | 2001 Fukuoka | 200 m breaststroke |
| Bronze medal – third place | 2001 Fukuoka | 4×100 m medley |
World Championships (SC)
| Silver medal – second place | 2002 Moscow | 50 m breaststroke |
| Bronze medal – third place | 2002 Moscow | 100 m breaststroke |
| Bronze medal – third place | 2002 Moscow | 4x100 m medley |
Pan Pacific Championships
| Bronze medal – third place | 2002 Yokohama | 100 m breaststroke |
Summer Universiade
| Gold medal – first place | 2003 Daegu | 50 m breaststroke |
| Gold medal – first place | 2003 Daegu | 100 m breaststroke |
| Gold medal – first place | 2003 Daegu | 4x100 m medley |
| Silver medal – second place | 2003 Daegu | 200 m breaststroke |

Luo Xuejuan (also Luo Xue Juan; simplified Chinese: 罗雪娟; traditional Chinese: 羅雪娟; pinyin: Luó Xuějuān; born January 26, 1984, in Hangzhou, Zhejiang) is a female Chinese swimmer, who competed mostly in the breaststroke. She is a former world record holder in the 50-meter breastroke (short course).

== Career ==
She began swimming in 1991 because her parents thought she was so thin that the exercise would make her stronger.

Luo first caught sporting world attention when she won the 100 breaststroke at China's 2000 Olympics Trials in Jinan in a solid time of 1:08.87 and finished second in the 200 breaststroke in 2:27.29. Strangely, she was only selected to swim the 200 breaststroke, her weaker event, at the 2000 Summer Olympics a few months later. She posted a personal best of 2:25.86 in the semi-finals, only to falter in the final and finish 8th in 2:27.33.

Going into 2001, Luo progressed rapidly. At the Chinese Nationals in April, she set a national record of 1:07.85 in the 100 breaststroke and placed 2nd in the 200 breaststroke (2:26.37) which was won by Qi Hui in a world record (2:22.99). Shortly afterwards, Luo lowered by 100 breast national record to 1:07.42 at the 2001 East Asian Games in Osaka.

At the 2001 World Championships in Fukuoka, Luo took home 4 medals, including gold in the 50 breaststroke (30.84, Asian record, missing the WR by a mere 0.01 sec) and 100 breaststroke (1:07.18, Asian record), and bronze in the 200 breaststroke (2:25.29 pb) and 4x100 medley relay (4:02.53; breaststroke split 1:06.47 was the 2nd fastest ever, behind USA's Megan Quann's 1:06.29 from Sydney 2000). Luo went on to win the 100 breaststroke at the 2001 Chinese National Games at 1:06.96 (Asian record). It was during these Games that she said her very well known quote, "The water in this pool is not very clean, but I am a clean swimmer myself" (referring to the series of astonishingly fast times posted by some totally unknown swimmers who were highly suspected of doping at the National Games).

The year 2002 did not start out well for Luo. She failed to win any gold at the World Short Course Championships in Moscow, finishing 2nd in the 50 breaststroke (30.17) and 3rd in the 100 breaststroke (1:06.36). The Pan Pacific Championships were equally disappointing, where Luo only managed a bronze in the 100 (1:08.70) and was 4th in the 200. Ironically, her time in the 100 breaststroke semi-final (1:08.14) would have been enough to win gold in the final.

Luo eventually shined at the 2002 Asian Games in Busan, winning gold in Asian records in the 100 breaststroke (1:06.84, fastest time globally in 2002) and 4x100 medley relay (4:00.21). She also placed 2nd in the 200 breaststroke behind WR holder Qi Hui (2:24.01 to 2:24.67 pb).

Before the 2003 World Championships in Barcelona, Luo set her goal at erasing Penny Heyns' 1:06.52 from the world record books. The record was indeed broken in Barcelona, not by Luo but by Australia's 2000 Olympic silver medallist Leisel Jones in the semi-finals (1:06.37). Luo, the defending champion, immediately became the underdog as she qualified 3rd fastest (1:07.76). In the event final, as all eyes (and pressure) were on Jones, Luo took the race out really hard, splitting a mind-boggling 30.87 at the 50m mark. This strategy worked as Jones was disturbed by Luo's horrid pace. Luo hanged on to win the race in yet another Asian record of 1:06.80, the 3rd fastest time in history. Jones only managed 3rd in 1:07.47, with the USA's Amanda Beard 2nd in 1:07.42. Luo also defended her 50 breaststroke world title in 30.67 (30.64 in semi-finals, just 0.07 sec off the WR), and swam the fastest breaststroke relay split (1:05.79) to help China win the 4x100 medley relay in 3:59.89 (Asian record and 2nd fastest time in history; 2nd team after the USA to crack 4 mins).

=== 2004 Summer Olympics ===
Luo's career highlight was the 2004 Summer Olympics, where she earned a gold medal in the 100 breaststroke in a new Olympic record of 1:06.64, the 3rd fastest time in history and just off the WR by 0.27 seconds (after qualifying 7th fastest in a mediocre 1:08.57), a remarkable feat considering that she was one of the slowest qualifiers for the final and swam in the outermost lane. Jones only managed a bronze (1:07.16), after setting an Olympic record of 1:06.78 in the semi-finals. Luo pulled out of the 200 breaststroke race to concentrate on swimming the 4x100 medley relay. Unfortunately the Chinese team only managed 4th place (4:03.35). Luo swam the race with a heartache problem and had to be helped to get out of the pool by her teammates after finishing her breaststroke leg (1:08.82).

=== After the Olympics ===
Shortly after the Olympics, Luo competed at the 2004 World Short Course Championships, where she finished 5th in the 50 breaststroke (31.15).

Luo failed to defend her 50 & 100 breaststroke titles in the XI FINA World Swimming Championships in Montreal in 2005. She was 4th in 100 breaststroke (1:07.60) and 7th in 50 breaststroke (31.50). Yet this was understandable as Luo participated in the entire championships with an injured ankle but insisted on competing. She did win the 100 breaststroke at the 2005 Chinese National Games though, posting the 3rd fastest time of the year (1:06.86). She also won silver in the 200 (2:26.50) behind Qi Hui, and posted the fastest relay split (1:05.69) in history when she swam the breaststroke leg for the Zhejiang team in the 4x100 medley relay.

Luo was surprisingly upset by young teammate Wang Qun (1:08.56 to 1:09.14) at the 2005 East Asian Games in Macau, though she captured gold in the 50 breast (31.67).

The 2006 season saw Luo skipping all major international meets, including the World Short Course Championships in Shanghai and the Pan Pacific Championships in Vancouver. Rumours started to build that Luo had quarrels with longtime coach Zhang Yadong (Zhang was appointed head coach of the Chinese national team and hence no longer has as much time and attention on coaching Luo as before). Luo was said to have been "exiled" back for training at her home province of Zhejiang, although the swimming authorities insisted that she was still a national team member. At the 2006 Asian Games Trials, Luo managed to win the 50 breaststroke (31.75) and place 2nd in the 100 breaststroke (1:09.14), but her name did not appear on the official list of athletes. The official explanation for not selecting the Olympic Champion is that Luo needed more time to fully rehabilitate her heart condition in preparation for the 2008 Olympic Games. The media was speculating that Luo was close to retirement.

== Retirement and afterwards ==
On 24 January 2007 Luo announced in a press conference that she was retiring from competitive swimming due to a heart surgery failure. According to Luo, doctors advised that her life might be in jeopardy if she continued to train at the intensity required for Olympic-level athletes.

Following her retirement, Luo resumed her university studies.

Luo Xuejuan became, on 24 March 2008, the second torchbearer at the 2008 Summer Olympics torch relay and the first torchbearer for China. She expressed her view on Olympic ideals as follows:"As a torchbearer, I think the Olympic spirit means purity, fair play, friendship, passion, peace and harmony."

== See also ==
- China at the 2004 Summer Olympics
- Swimming at the 2004 Summer Olympics
