= Junko Isoda =

Japanese swimmer (born 1981)

Personal information
- Full name: Junko Isoda
- Nationality: Japan
- Born: 11 March 1981 (age 45) Tokyo, Japan
- Height: 1.65 m (5 ft 5 in)
- Weight: 58 kg (128 lb)

Sport
- Sport: Swimming
- Strokes: Breaststroke
Medal record
Women's swimming
Representing Japan
Pan Pacific Championships
Bronze medal – third place	1997 Fukuoka	4x100 m medley
Asian Games
Bronze medal – third place	1998 Bangkok	200 m breaststroke

Junko Isoda (磯田 順子, Isoda Junko; born 11 March 1981) is a Japanese former swimmer who competed in the 2000 Summer Olympics.
