= Swimming at the 2007 World Aquatics Championships – Women's 200 metre butterfly =

The Women's 200m Butterfly at the 2007 World Aquatics Championships took place on 28 March (prelims & semifinals) and the evening of 29 March (finals) at the Rod Laver Arena in Melbourne, Australia. 57 swimmers were entered in the event, of which 54 swam.

Existing records at the start of the event were:

- World Record (WR): 2:05.40, Jessicah Schipper (Australia), 17 August 2006 in Victoria, Canada.
- Championship Record (CR): 2:05.61, Otylia Jędrzejczak (Poland), Montreal 2005 (28 July 2005)

== Results ==
=== Final ===
| Place | Name | Nationality | Time | Note |
|---|---|---|---|---|
| 1st | Jessicah Schipper | Australia | 2:06.39 | |
| 2nd | Kim Vandenberg | USA | 2:06.71 | |
| 3rd | Otylia Jędrzejczak | Poland | 2:06.90 | |
| 4th | Jiao Liuyang | China | 2:07.22 | |
| 5th | Audrey Lacroix | Canada | 2:07.73 | |
| 6th | Yuko Nakanishi | Japan | 2:09.43 | |
| 7th | Sara Isaković | Slovenia | 2:09.66 | |
| 8th | Aurore Mongel | France | 2:13.61 | |

=== Semifinals ===
| Rank | Swimmer | Nation | Time | Note |
|---|---|---|---|---|
| 1 | Jessicah Schipper | Australia | 2:07.72 | Q |
| 2 | Kim Vandenberg | USA | 2:08.06 | Q |
| 3 | Jiao Liuyang | China | 2:08.20 | Q |
| 4 | Audrey Lacroix | Canada | 2:08.42 | Q |
| 5 | Otylia Jędrzejczak | Poland | 2:08.57 | Q |
| 6 | Sara Isaković | Slovenia | 2:09.15 | Q |
| 7 | Yuko Nakanishi | Japan | 2:09.21 | Q |
| 7 | Aurore Mongel | France | 2:09.21 | Q |
| 9 | Felicity Galvez | Australia | 2:09.49 | |
| 10 | Yurie Yano | Japan | 2:10.03 | |
| 11 | Yana Martynova | Russia | 2:10.45 | |
| 12 | Hye Ra Choi | South Korea | 2:10.52 | |
| 13 | Jessica Dickons | Great Britain | 2:11.32 | |
| 14 | Beatrix Boulsevicz | Hungary | 2:12.07 | |
| 15 | You Ri Kown | South Korea | 2:12.42 | |
| 16 | Terri Dunning | Great Britain | 2:13.08 | |

=== Preliminaries ===
==== Prelims rankings ====
| Rank | Name | Nationality | Time | Note |
|---|---|---|---|---|
| 1 | Audrey Lacroix | Canada | 2:08.12 | Q |
| 2 | Otylia Jędrzejczak | Poland | 2:08.38 | Q |
| 3 | Kim Vandenberg | USA | 2:08.63 | Q |
| 4 | Sara Isaković | Slovenia | 2:08.69 | Q |
| 5 | Jiao Liuyang | China | 2:09.33 | Q |
| 6 | Yurie Yano | Japan | 2:09.58 | Q |
| 7 | Felicity Galvez | Australia | 2:09.67 | Q |
| 8 | Yuko Nakanishi | Japan | 2:09.69 | Q |
| 9 | Jessicah Schipper | Australia | 2:09.83 | Q |
| 10 | Yana Martynova | Russia | 2:09.90 | Q |
| 11 | Aurore Mongel | France | 2:10.19 | Q |
| 12 | Jessica Dickons | Great Britain | 2:10.40 | Q |
| 13 | Hye Ra Choi | South Korea | 2:10.85 | Q |
| 14 | Beatrix Boulsevicz | Hungary | 2:10.87 | Q |
| 15 | You Ri Kown | South Korea | 2:11.15 | Q |
| 16 | Terri Dunning | Great Britain | 2:11.65 | Q |
| 17 | Mary DeScenza | USA | 2:11.73 | |
| 18 | Francesca Segat | Italy | 2:11.88 | |
| 19 | Caterina Giacchetti | Italy | 2:11.99 | |
| 19 | Natalya Sutyagina | Russia | 2:11.99 | |
| 21 | Mackenzie Downing | Canada | 2:12.34 | |
| 22 | Georgina Bardach | Argentina | 2:12.45 | |
| 22 | Mireia Belmonte García | Spain | 2:12.45 | |
| 24 | Keri-Leigh Shaw | South Africa | 2:12.49 | |
| 25 | Sara Oliveira | Portugal | 2:12.61 | |
| 26 | Sara Madeira | Portugal | 2:13.32 | |
| 27 | DENG Biying | China | 2:13.88 | |
| 28 | Petra Granlund | Sweden | 2:14.10 | |
| 29 | Sarah Bey | France | 2:14.83 | |
| 30 | Birgit Koschischek | Austria | 2:15.90 | |
| 31 | Heather Brand | Zimbabwe | 2:15.91 | |
| 32 | Sarah Hadj Aberrahmane | Algeria | 2:18.22 | |
| 33 | Andreina Pinto | Venezuela | 2:18.96 | |
| 34 | Maria Rodriguez | Venezuela | 2:19.20 | |
| 35 | Ting Wen Quah | Singapore | 2:19.27 | |
| 36 | Denisa Smolenova | Slovakia | 2:19.59 | |
| 37 | Maria Gandionco | Philippines | 2:20.98 | |
| 38 | Pooja Raghava Alva | India | 2:23.25 | |
| 39 | Angela Galea | Malta | 2:23.91 | |
| 40 | Ira Kurniawan | Indonesia | 2:24.37 | |
| 41 | Yih Shiuan Chan | Macao | 2:24.45 | |
| 42 | Simona Muccioli | San Marino | 2:24.87 | |
| 43 | Monika Spasova | Macedonia | 2:27.03 | |
| 44 | Madhavi Gir Govind | India | 2:27.90 | |
| 45 | Ana Guadalupe Hernandez Duarte | El Salvador | 2:28.26 | |
| 46 | Lynette Lim | Singapore | 2:28.51 | |
| 47 | Thi Hanh Phan | Vietnam | 2:30.13 | |
| 48 | Tojohanitra Andriamanjatoarimanana | Madagascar | 2:32.41 | |
| 49 | Maftunabonu Tuhtasinova | Uzbekistan | 2:34.01 | |
| 50 | Cai Lin Khoo | Malaysia | 2:35.18 | |
| 51 | Darja Pop | Montenegro | 2:35.40 | |
| 52 | Layla Alghul | Jordan | 2:35.86 | |
| 53 | Prisca Rose | Mauritius | 2:36.21 | |
| 54 | Binta Zahra Diop | Senegal | 2:49.48 | |
| -- | Nina Dittrich | Austria | DNS | |
| -- | Noufissa Chbihi | Morocco | DQ | |
| -- | Gabriella Fagundez | Sweden | DQ | |

==== Heat 1 ====
| # | Lane | Name | Country | Reaction time | 50 m | 100 m | 150 m | Time | Rank | Behind |
|---|---|---|---|---|---|---|---|---|---|---|
| 1 | 4 | Tojohanitra Andriamanjatoarimanana | Madagascar | 0.76 | 31.92 | 1:09.83 | 1:49.90 | 2:32.41 | 48 | +24.29 |
| 2 | 5 | Prisca Rose | Mauritius | 0.89 | 33.67 | 1:12.55 | 1:53.93 | 2:36.21 | 53 | +28.09 |
| 3 | 3 | Binta Zahra Diop | Senegal | 0.89 | 34.39 | 1:17.75 | 2:03.03 | 2:49.48 | 54 | +41.36 |

==== Heat 2 ====
| # | Lane | Name | Country | Reaction time | 50 m | 100 m | 150 m | Time | Rank | Behind |
|---|---|---|---|---|---|---|---|---|---|---|
| 1 | 2 | Simona Muccioli | San Marino | 0.84 | 31.90 | 1:08.54 | 1:46.39 | 2:24.87 | 42 | +16.75 |
| 2 | 4 | Ana Guadalupe Hernandez Duarte | El Salvador | 0.74 | 32.84 | 1:10.02 | 1:47.68 | 2:28.26 | 45 | +20.14 |
| 3 | 7 | Maftunabonu Tuhtasinova | Uzbekistan | 0.86 | 34.24 | 1:13.34 | 1:52.51 | 2:34.01 | 49 | +25.89 |
| 4 | 5 | Darija Pop | Montenegro | 0.87 | 33.09 | 1:11.01 | 1:52.10 | 2:35.40 | 51 | +27.28 |
| 5 | 3 | Layla Alghul | Jordan | 0.97 | 32.05 | 1:09.95 | 1:50.72 | 2:35.86 | 52 | +27.74 |
| | 6 | Noufissa Chbihi | Morocco | DSQ | | | | | | |

==== Heat 3 ====
| # | Lane | Name | Country | Reaction time | 50 m | 100 m | 150 m | Time | Rank | Behind |
|---|---|---|---|---|---|---|---|---|---|---|
| 1 | 3 | Heather Brand | Zimbabwe | 0.79 | 30.37 | 1:05.26 | 1:40.44 | 2:15.91 | 31 | +7.79 |
| 2 | 2 | Pooja Raghava | India | 0.95 | 31.14 | 1:06.76 | 1:44.31 | 2:23.25 | 38 | +15.13 |
| 3 | 1 | Ira Kurniawan | Indonesia | 0.77 | 32.27 | 1:09.32 | 1:46.85 | 2:24.37 | 40 | +16.25 |
| 4 | 5 | Yih Shiuan Chan | Macau | 0.74 | 31.69 | 1:07.77 | 1:45.29 | 2:24.45 | 41 | +16.33 |
| 5 | 7 | Monika Spasova | Macedonia | 0.77 | 32.89 | 1:09.96 | 1:48.56 | 2:27.03 | 43 | +18.91 |
| 6 | 8 | Madhavi Giri Govind | India | 0.83 | 32.55 | 1:09.35 | 1:48.22 | 2:27.90 | 44 | +19.78 |
| 7 | 4 | Lynette Lim | Singapore | 0.72 | 32.64 | 1:09.52 | 1:48.06 | 2:28.51 | 46 | +20.39 |
| 8 | 6 | Cai Lin Khoo | Malaysia | 0.84 | 33.41 | 1:13.27 | 1:54.72 | 2:35.18 | 50 | +27.06 |

==== Heat 4 ====
| # | Lane | Name | Country | Reaction time | 50 m | 100 m | 150 m | Time | Rank | Behind |
|---|---|---|---|---|---|---|---|---|---|---|
| 1 | 5 | Birgit Koschischek | Austria | 0.79 | 30.72 | 1:05.49 | 1:40.29 | 2:15.90 | 30 | +7.78 |
| 2 | 3 | Sarah Hadj Aberrahmane | Algeria | 0.77 | 30.33 | 1:04.83 | 1:40.94 | 2:18.22 | 32 | +10.10 |
| 3 | 6 | Andreina Pinto | Venezuela | 0.87 | 31.77 | 1:07.63 | 1:43.41 | 2:18.96 | 33 | +10.84 |
| 4 | 2 | Maria Rodriguez | Algeria | 0.68 | 31.39 | 1:06.81 | 1:43.61 | 2:19.20 | 34 | +11.08 |
| 5 | 4 | Ting Wen Quah | Singapore | 0.79 | 30.78 | 1:06.17 | 1:42.58 | 2:19.27 | 35 | +11.15 |
| 6 | 7 | Maria Georgina Consuelo Gandionco | Philippines | 0.77 | 32.04 | 1:07.56 | 1:43.48 | 2:20.98 | 37 | +12.86 |
| 7 | 8 | Angela Galea | Malta | 0.85 | 32.30 | 1:09.54 | 1:46.79 | 2:23.91 | 39 | +15.79 |
| 8 | 1 | Thi Hanh Phan | Vietnam | 0.72 | 33.20 | 1:11.69 | 1:51.08 | 2:30.13 | 47 | +22.01 |

==== Heat 5 ====
| # | Lane | Name | Country | Reaction time | 50 m | 100 m | 150 m | Time | Rank | Behind |
|---|---|---|---|---|---|---|---|---|---|---|
| 1 | 5 | Georgina Bardach | Argentina | 0.84 | 30.12 | 1:03.75 | 1:37.78 | 2:12.45 | =22 | +4.33 |
| 2 | 2 | Keri-Leigh Shaw | South Africa | 0.77 | 29.71 | 1:03.51 | 1:37.89 | 2:12.49 | 24 | +4.37 |
| 3 | 8 | Sara Oliveira | Portugal | 0.82 | 29.38 | 1:03.01 | 1:37.47 | 2:12.61 | 25 | +4.49 |
| 4 | 6 | Sara Madeira | Portugal | 0.81 | 29.75 | 1:03.20 | 1:37.67 | 2:13.32 | 26 | +5.20 |
| 5 | 3 | Petra Granlund | Sweden | 0.83 | 29.62 | 1:03.37 | 1:38.05 | 2:14.10 | 28 | +5.98 |
| 6 | 1 | Denisa Smolenova | Slovakia | 0.81 | 29.87 | 1:04.20 | 1:40.76 | 2:19.59 | 36 | +11.47 |
| | 4 | Nina Dittrich | Austria | DNS | | | | | | |
| | 7 | Gabriella Fagundez | Sweden | DSQ | | | | | | |

==== Heat 6 ====
| # | Lane | Name | Country | Reaction time | 50 m | 100 m | 150 m | Time | Rank | Behind |
|---|---|---|---|---|---|---|---|---|---|---|
| 1 | 4 | Otylia Jędrzejczak | Poland | 0.81 | 29.15 | 1:01.72 | 1:34.60 | 2:08.38 Q | 2 | +0.26 |
| 2 | 5 | Kim Vandenberg | United States | 0.69 | 29.37 | 1:01.94 | 1:35.03 | 2:08.63 Q | 3 | +0.51 |
| 3 | 2 | Sara Isaković | Slovenia | 0.80 | 29.18 | 1:01.51 | 1:34.99 | 2:08.69 Q | 4 | +0.57 |
| 4 | 7 | Yana Martynova | Russia | 0.97 | 30.39 | 1:02.12 | 1:36.18 | 2:09.90 Q | 10 | +1.78 |
| 5 | 6 | Aurore Mongel | France | 0.85 | 29.26 | 1:02.44 | 1:36.30 | 2:10.19 Q | 11 | +2.07 |
| 6 | 3 | Mary Descenza | United States | 0.78 | 29.23 | 1:02.04 | 1:35.76 | 2:11.73 | 17 | +3.61 |
| 7 | 8 | Mireia Belmonte García | Spain | 0.93 | 30.15 | 1:03.74 | 1:38.09 | 2:12.45 | =22 | +4.33 |
| 8 | 1 | Biying Deng | China | 0.83 | 29.18 | 1:02.42 | 1:37.89 | 2:13.88 | 27 | +5.76 |

==== Heat 7 ====
| # | Lane | Name | Country | Reaction time | 50 m | 100 m | 150 m | Time | Rank | Behind |
|---|---|---|---|---|---|---|---|---|---|---|
| 1 | 3 | Jiao Liuyang | China | 0.78 | 28.44 | 1:01.80 | 1:35.73 | 2:09.33 Q | 5 | +1.21 |
| 2 | 5 | Felicity Galvez | Australia | 0.79 | 29.31 | 1:01.98 | 1:35.36 | 2:09.67 Q | 7 | +1.55 |
| 3 | 4 | Yuko Nakanishi | Japan | 0.77 | 28.81 | 1:02.26 | 1:35.78 | 2:09.69 Q | 8 | +1.57 |
| 4 | 2 | Jessica Dickons | United Kingdom | 0.73 | 29.18 | 1:02.24 | 1:36.14 | 2:10.40 Q | 12 | +2.28 |
| 5 | 1 | You Ri Kown | South Korea | 0.83 | 29.38 | 1:02.98 | 1:37.04 | 2:11.15 Q | 15 | +3.03 |
| 6 | 7 | Terri Dunning | United Kingdom | 0.80 | 29.34 | 1:02.37 | 1:36.40 | 2:11.65 Q | 16 | +3.53 |
| 7 | 6 | Caterina Giacchetti | Italy | 0.87 | 29.44 | 1:02.52 | 1:36.88 | 2:11.99 | =19 | +3.87 |
| 7 | 8 | Natalya Sutyagina | Russia | 0.86 | 28.91 | 1:02.78 | 1:36.54 | 2:11.99 | =19 | +3.87 |

==== Heat 8 ====
| # | Lane | Name | Country | Reaction time | 50 m | 100 m | 150 m | Time | Rank | Behind |
|---|---|---|---|---|---|---|---|---|---|---|
| 1 | 8 | Audrey Lacroix | Canada | 0.76 | 28.63 | 1:00.98 | 1:33.92 | 2:08.12 Q | 1 | +0.00 |
| 2 | 5 | Yurie Yano | Japan | 0.77 | 29.18 | 1:02.00 | 1:35.60 | 2:09.58 Q | 6 | +1.46 |
| 3 | 4 | Jessicah Schipper | Australia | 0.71 | 28.16 | 1:00.91 | 1:35.71 | 2:09.83 Q | 9 | +1.71 |
| 4 | 7 | Hye Ra Choi | South Korea | 0.81 | 29.75 | 1:02.33 | 1:35.86 | 2:10.85 Q | 13 | +2.73 |
| 5 | 6 | Beatrix Boulsevicz | Hungary | 0.77 | 28.81 | 1:01.18 | 1:35.35 | 2:10.87 Q | 14 | +2.75 |
| 6 | 3 | Francesca Segat | Italy | 0.81 | 29.40 | 1:02.67 | 1:36.55 | 2:11.88 | 18 | +3.76 |
| 7 | 1 | Mackenzie Downing | Canada | 0.81 | 29.17 | 1:02.74 | 1:37.19 | 2:12.34 | 21 | +4.22 |
| 8 | 2 | Sarah Bey | France | 0.84 | 30.03 | 1:03.87 | 1:38.59 | 2:14.83 | 29 | +6.71 |

== See also ==
- Swimming at the 2005 World Aquatics Championships – Women's 200 metre butterfly
- Swimming at the 2008 Summer Olympics – Women's 200 metre butterfly
- Swimming at the 2009 World Aquatics Championships – Women's 200 metre butterfly
