= Swimming at the 2007 World Aquatics Championships – Women's 100 metre butterfly =

The Women's 100m Butterfly at the 2007 World Aquatics Championships took place on 25 March (prelims & semifinals) and the evening of 26 March (finals) at the Rod Laver Arena in Melbourne, Australia. 75 swimmers were entered in the event, of which 74 swam.

Existing records at the start of the event were:

- World Record (WR): 56.61, Inge de Bruijn (Netherlands), 17 September 2000 in Sydney, Australia.
- Championship Record (CR): 57.23, Jessicah Schipper (Australia), Montreal 2005 (25 July 2005)

== Results ==
=== Final ===
Place	Lane	Name	Country	50 m split	Time	Note
1st place, gold medalist(s)	5	Lisbeth Lenton	Australia	26.58	57.15	CR
2nd place, silver medalist(s)	4	Jessicah Schipper	Australia	26.74	57.24	
3rd place, bronze medalist(s)	6	Natalie Coughlin	USA	26.40	57.34	
4	3	Inge Dekker	Netherlands	26.79	58.30	
5	7	Rachel Komisarz	USA	27.45	58.34	
6	1	Alena Popchanka	France	26.97	58.73	
7	2	Zhou Yafei	China	26.90	58.76	
8	8	Xu Yanwei	China	27.07	59.22	

=== Semifinals ===
Rank	Heat/Lane	Name	Country	50 m split	Time	Note
1	H2-L5	Jessicah Schipper	Australia	26.82	57.57	Q
2	H2-L6	Lisbeth Lenton	Australia	26.71	57.78	Q
3	H1-L5	Inge Dekker	Netherlands	26.32	57.82	Q
4	H1-L4	Natalie Coughlin	USA	26.64	58.11	Q
5	H1-L2	Zhou Yafei	China	26.69	58.20	Q
6	H2-L4	Rachel Komisarz	USA	27.07	58.39	Q
7	H1-L6	Alena Popchanka	France	27.24	58.49	Q
8	H2-L2	Xu Yanwei	China	27.20	58.82	Q
9	H1-L8	Tao Li	Singapore	27.63	59.07	
10	H2-L3	Irina Bespalova	Russia	27.43	59.10	
11	H1-L7	Antje Buschschulte	Germany	26.91	59.12	
12	H2-L1	Sara Isaković	Slovenia	27.35	59.16	
13	H1-L3	Natalya Sutyagina	Russia	27.35	59.17	
14	H1-L1	Daniela Samulski	Germany	27.26	59.35	
15	H2-L7	Mackenzie Downing	Canada	28.06	59.61	
16	H2-L8	Keri-Leigh Shaw	South Africa	27.71	1:00.50	

=== Preliminaries ===
Heat	Lane	Name	Country	50 m split	Time	Overall rank	Note
1	5	Nicole Ellsworth	Mauritius	32.93	1:10.55	71	
1	4	Emma Hunter	Samoa	31.65	1:10.76	72	
1	3	Ana Roxiero	Angola		DNS		
2	6	Layla Alghul	Jordan	31.18	1:07.00	59	
2	3	Karen Torrez	Bolivia	32.22	1:08.47	62	
2	5	Razan Taha	Jordan	31.84	1:09.25	65	
2	4	Mandhavi Giri Govind	India	32.02	1:09.41	66	
2	8	Marie Laura Meza Peraza	Costa Rica	32.60	1:09.93	67	
2	7	Fiorella Gomez-Sanchez	Peru	32.75	1:10.00	68	
2	1	Prisca Rose	Mauritius	31.98	1:10.38	70	
2	2	Dalia Massiel Torrez Zamora	Nicaragua	32.15	1:11.72	73	
3	4	Cheok Mei Ma	Macau	30.50	1:05.00	51	
3	6	Angela Galea	Malta	31.38	1:05.75	54	
3	7	Davina Mangion	Malta	31.12	1:06.39	57	
3	1	Galina Dukhanova	Uzbekistan	31.12	1:06.98	58	
3	2	Binta Zahra Diop	Senegal	31.19	1:07.01	60	
3	5	Ana Guadalupe Hernandez Duarte	El Salvador	31.85	1:08.59	64	
3	8	Maria Alejandra Torres	Peru	32.26	1:10.14	69	
3	3	Mirjana Stojanova	Macedonia	32.61	1:13.01	74	
4	5	Ellen Hight	Zambia	29.60	1:03.76	48	
4	4	Maria Rodriguez	Venezuela	29.95	1:03.93	49	
4	3	Koh Ting Ting	Singapore	30.29	1:05.00	51	
4	7	Ira Kurniawan	Indonesia	30.69	1:05.68	53	
4	1	Sharon Paola Fajardo Sierra	Honduras	30.79	1:05.88	55	
4	2	Monika Spasova	Macedonia	31.26	1:05.89	56	
4	6	Thi Hanh Phan	Vietnam	31.38	1:07.01	60	
4	8	Cai Lin Khoo	Malaysia	32.09	1:08.50	63	
5	7	Anna Gostomelsky	Israel	28.08	1:00.37	25	
5	4	Fabíola Molina	Brazil	28.86	1:01.18	35	
5	5	Amit Ivry	Israel	28.54	1:01.22	36	
5	6	Heather Brand	Zimbabwe	28.43	1:01.64	40	
5	2	Hang Yu Sze	Hong Kong	28.74	1:01.92	43	
5	3	Iris Rosenberger	Turkey	29.12	1:02.26	45	
5	8	Loren Bahamonde	Ecuador	29.54	1:03.65	47	
5	1	Chanelle van Wyk	South Africa	29.39	1:04.55	50	
6	1	Gabriella Fagundez	Sweden	28.26	1:00.64	30	
6	5	Sara Oliveira	Portugal	28.49	1:00.81	31	
6	6	Petra Granlund	Sweden	28.38	1:00.95	32	
6	4	Jessica Dickons	Great Britain	28.94	1:01.11	34	
6	8	Sara Madeira	Portugal	28.48	1:01.39	38	
6	2	You Ri Kown	South Korea	28.99	1:01.85	41	
6	3	Micha Jensen	Denmark	28.31	1:02.15	44	
6	7	Denisa Smolenova	Slovakia	29.38	1:03.54	46	
7	7	Keri-Leigh Shaw	South Africa	27.76	59.79	15	Q
7	4	Jeanette Ottesen	Denmark	27.89	1:00.04	19	
7	6	Birgit Koschischek	Austria	27.92	1:00.19	22	
7	1	Kimberly Buys	Belgium	27.98	1:00.37	25	
7	5	Audrey Lacroix	Canada	28.44	1:00.40	27	
7	2	Aleksandra Urbanczyk	Poland	28.19	1:01.22	36	
7	8	Hannah Wilson	Hong Kong	28.74	1:01.49	39	
7	3	Hae In Shin	South Korea	28.64	1:01.85	41	
8	4	Natalie Coughlin	USA	26.97	58.34	2	Q
8	5	Zhou Yafei	China	27.45	59.36	10	Q
8	8	Sara Isaković	Slovenia	27.48	59.40	13	Q
8	3	Daniela Samulski	Germany	27.40	59.70	14	Q
8	2	Terri Dunning	Great Britain	28.14	59.87	17	
8	1	Aurore Mongel	France	27.99	1:00.13	21	
8	6	Yuko Nakanishi	Japan	28.61	1:00.31	23	
8	7	Francesca Segat	Italy	28.80	1:00.53	29	
9	5	Inge Dekker	Netherlands	26.97	58.66	4	Q
9	7	Irina Bespalova	Russia	27.70	58.71	5	Q
9	6	Natalya Sutyagina	Russia	27.52	58.72	6	Q
9	4	Lisbeth Lenton	Australia	27.35	58.93	7	Q
9	3	Xu Yanwei	China	27.54	59.23	9	Q
9	8	Mackenzie Downing	Canada	27.90	59.36	10	Q
9	2	Martina Moravcová	Slovakia	28.17	1:00.02	18	
9	1	Chantal Groot	Netherlands	28.02	1:00.09	20	
10	5	Rachel Komisarz	USA	27.51	57.98	1	Q
10	4	Jessicah Schipper	Australia	27.46	58.52	3	Q
10	3	Alena Popchanka	France	27.58	59.14	8	Q
10	6	Antje Buschschulte	Germany	27.12	59.39	12	Q
10	2	Tao Li	Singapore	28.31	59.79	15	Q
10	1	Ayako Doi	Japan	27.76	1:00.31	23	
10	8	Elena Gemo	Italy	27.94	1:00.46	28	
10	7	Beatrix Boulsevicz	Hungary	28.44	1:01.04	33	

== See also ==
- Swimming at the 2005 World Aquatics Championships – Women's 100 metre butterfly
- Swimming at the 2008 Summer Olympics – Women's 100 metre butterfly
- Swimming at the 2009 World Aquatics Championships – Women's 100 metre butterfly
