= Swimming at the 2005 World Aquatics Championships – Women's 200 metre butterfly =

Women's 200 Butterfly at the 2005 FINA World Aquatics Championships
- Dates: 27 July (prelims and semifinals); 28 July (final)
- Competitors: 39 from 28 nations
- Winning time: 2:05.61 WR

Medalists
gold medal	Otylia Jędrzejczak	Poland
silver medal	Jessicah Schipper	Australia
bronze medal	Yuko Nakanishi	Japan

The Women's 200 Butterfly event at the 11th FINA World Aquatics Championships swam 27 – 28 July 2005 in Montreal, Canada. Preliminary and Semifinal heats were on 27 July; the Final was held 28 July.

At the start of the event, the existing World (WR) and Championships (CR) records were:

- WR: 2:05.78 swum by Otylia Jędrzejczak (Poland) on 4 August 2002 in Berlin, Germany
- CR: 2:06.73 swum by Petria Thomas (Australia) on 23 July 2001 in Fukuoka, Japan

== Results ==
=== Final ===
Place	Swimmer	Nation	Time	Notes
1	Otylia Jędrzejczak	Poland	2:05.61	WR
2	Jessicah Schipper	Australia	2:05.65	OC
3	Yuko Nakanishi	Japan	2:09.40	
4	Caterina Giacchetti	Italy	2:10.03	
5	Felicity Galvez	Australia	2:10.35	
6	Mary DeScenza	USA	2:10.44	
7	Annika Mehlhorn	Germany	2:10.61	
8	Yuri Yano	Japan	2:10.89	

=== Semifinals ===
Rank	Heat + Lane	Swimmer	Nation	Time	Notes
1	S2 L4	Otylia Jędrzejczak	Poland	2:08.30	q
2	S1 L4	Jessicah Schipper	Australia	2:08.38	q
3	S2 L5	Yurie Yano	Japan	2:08.63	q
4	S1 L2	Yuko Nakanishi	Japan	2:08.90	q
5	S1 L6	Caterina Giacchetti	Italy	2:09.40	q
6	S1 L5	Mary DeScenza	USA	2:09.73	q
7	S2 L3	Felicity Galvez	Australia	2:10.08	q
8	S2 L2	Annika Mehlhorn	Germany	2:10.28	q
9	S1 L3	Francesca Segat	Italy	2:10.63	
10	S1 L7	Mireia García	Spain	2:11.06	
11	S2 L8	Emily Mason	USA	2:11.13	
12	S2 L6	Zsuzsanna Jakabos	Hungary	2:11.82	
13	S1 L1	Beatrix Boulsevicz	Hungary	2:12.30	
14	S2 L7	Audrey Lacroix	Canada	2:12.59	
15	S1 L8	Petra Granlund	Sweden	2:13.60	
16	S2 L1	Li Jie	China	2:13.70	

=== Preliminaries ===
Rank	Heat + Lane	Swimmer	Nation	Time	Notes
1	H5 L4	Otylia Jędrzejczak	Poland	2:09.21	q
2	H3 L4	Jessicah Schipper	Australia	2:09.40	q
3	H5 L6	Yurie Yano	Japan	2:10.19	q
4	H3 L5	Mary DeScenza	United States	2:10.59	q
5	H5 L3	Felicity Galvez	Australia	2:10.89	q
6	H3 L6	Francesca Segat	Italy	2:10.98	q
7	H3 L3	Zsuzsanna Jakabos	Hungary	2:11.14	q
8	H5 L5	Caterina Giacchetti	Italy	2:11.17	q
9	H4 L3	Annika Mehlhorn	Germany	2:11.23	q
10	H4 L4	Yuko Nakanishi	Japan	2:11.24	q
11	H5 L2	Audrey Lacroix	Canada	2:11.34	q
12	H4 L7	Mireia García	Spain	2:11.75	q
13	H5 L7	Li Jie	China	2:11.85	q
14	H4 L5	Beatrix Boulsevicz	Hungary	2:12.62	q
15	H4 L6	Emily Mason	United States	2:12.64	q
16	H4 L8	Petra Granlund	Sweden	2:12.79	q
17	H3 L7	Natalia Sutiagina	Russia	2:13.24	
18	H3 L2	Aurore Mongel	France	2:13.51	
19	H4 L1	You-Ri Kwon	South Korea	2:14.15	
20	H3 L1	Liu Zige	China	2:14.25	
21	H3 L8	Mandy Loots	South Africa	2:15.19	
22	H5 L8	Georgina Bardach	Argentina	2:15.76	
23	H2 L3	Marcela Kubalčíková	Czech Republic	2:17.10	
24	H2 L5	Bernadette Lee	Singapore	2:17.39	
25	H4 L2	Hye Ra Choi	South Korea	2:17.69	
26	H2 L4	Channelle Van Wyk	South Africa	2:17.77	
27	H5 L1	Cheng Wan-tong	Chinese Taipei	2:19.04	
28	H2 L2	Ting Wen Quah	Singapore	2:21.50	
29	H2 L8	Phan Thi Hanh	Vietnam	2:21.55	
30	H2 L1	Angela Galea	Malta	2:21.87	
31	H2 L6	Yang Chin-kuei	Chinese Taipei	2:22.35	
32	H1 L5	Lacken Malateste	Tahiti	2:23.95	
33	H2 L7	Natnapa Prommuenwai	Thailand	2:24.06	
34	H1 L6	Davina Mangion	Malta	2:27.06	
35	H1 L3	Ana Hernandez Duarte	El Salvador	2:28.13	
36	H1 L7	Sharon Fajardo	Honduras	2:29.27	
37	H1 L2	Parita Parekh	India	2:42.24	
38	H1 L1	Binta Zahra Diop	Senegal	2:45.79	
--	--	Simona Muccioli	San Marino	DNS	
