= 2010 Pan Pacific Swimming Championships – Women's 100 metre butterfly =

Women's 100 metre butterfly at the 2010 Pan Pacific Swimming Championships
- Venue: William Woollett Jr. Aquatics Center
- Dates: August 20, 2010 (heats & finals)
- Competitors: 20 from 7 nations
- Winning time: 57.56

Medalists
gold medal	Dana Vollmer	United States
silver medal	Christine Magnuson	United States
bronze medal	Alicia Coutts	Australia

The women's 100 metre butterfly competition at the 2010 Pan Pacific Swimming Championships took place on August 20 at the William Woollett Jr. Aquatics Center. The last champion was Jessicah Schipper of Australia.

This race consisted of two lengths of the pool, all in butterfly.

== Records ==
Prior to this competition, the existing world and Pan Pacific records were as follows:

World record	Sarah Sjöström (SWE)	56.06	Rome, Italy	July 27, 2009
Pan Pacific Championships record	Jessicah Schipper (AUS)	57.30	Victoria, Canada	August 19, 2006

== Results ==
All times are in minutes and seconds.

KEY:	q	Fastest non-qualifiers	Q	Qualified	CR	Championships record	NR	National record	PB	Personal best	SB	Seasonal best

=== Heats ===
The first round was held on August 20, at 10:52.

Rank	Heat	Lane	Name	Nationality	Time	Notes
1	1	4	Christine Magnuson	United States	57.82	QA
2	3	5	Dana Vollmer	United States	57.89	QA
3	2	3	Kathleen Hersey	United States	58.32	QA
4	2	6	Alicia Coutts	Australia	58.44	QA
5	1	6	Yolane Kukla	Australia	58.46	QA
6	2	5	Felicity Galvez	Australia	58.61	QA
7	3	4	Jessicah Schipper	Australia	58.63	QA
8	1	7	Katerine Savard	Canada	58.84	QA
9	3	3	Yuka Kato	Japan	59.16	QB
10	3	6	Tomoyo Fukuda	Japan	59.19	QB
11	3	1	Audrey Lacroix	Canada	59.29	QB
12	1	2	Mary Mohler	United States	59.43	QB
13	1	3	Hannah Wilson	Hong Kong	59.71	QB
14	2	2	Marieke Guehrer	Australia	59.74	QB
15	2	4	Gabriella Silva	Brazil	59.84	QB
16	2	1	MacKenzie Downing	Canada	1:00.03	QB
17	2	7	Hiroko Sugino	Japan	1:00.22	
18	3	7	Park Na-Ri	South Korea	1:00.53	
19	3	2	Natsumi Hoshi	Japan	1:00.55	
20	3	8	Rachel Bootsma	United States	1:01.75	
-	1	1	Fabíola Molina	Brazil	DNS	
-	1	5	Stephanie Rice	Australia	DNS	

=== B Final ===
The B final was held on August 20, at 18:42.

Rank	Lane	Name	Nationality	Time	Notes
9	8	Jessicah Schipper	Australia	58.26	
10	5	Felicity Galvez	Australia	58.50	
11	4	Kathleen Hersey	United States	59.00	
12	3	Hannah Wilson	Hong Kong	59.86	
13	2	MacKenzie Downing	Canada	1:00.01	
14	7	Hiroko Sugino	Japan	1:00.02	
15	6	Gabriella Silva	Brazil	1:00.15	
16	1	Park Na-Ri	South Korea	1:00.30	

=== A Final ===
The A final was held on August 20, at 18:42.

Rank	Lane	Name	Nationality	Time	Notes
1st place, gold medalist(s)	5	Dana Vollmer	United States	57.56	
2nd place, silver medalist(s)	4	Christine Magnuson	United States	57.95	
3rd place, bronze medalist(s)	3	Alicia Coutts	Australia	57.99	
4	6	Yolane Kukla	Australia	58.22	
5	7	Yuka Kato	Japan	58.75	
6	2	Katerine Savard	Canada	58.92	
7	8	Audrey Lacroix	Canada	59.22	
8	1	Tomoyo Fukuda	Japan	59.35	
