= Swimming at the 2007 World Aquatics Championships – Women's 4 × 100 metre medley relay =

The Women's 4 × 100 m Medley Relay at the 2007 World Aquatics Championships took place on 31 March 2007 at the Rod Laver Arena in Melbourne, Australia. The top-12 finishers from this race qualified for the event at the 2008 Olympics. 29 teams were entered in the event; all swam.

The existing records when the event started were:

- World Record (WR): 3:56.30, Australia (Edington, Jones, Schipper, Lenton), 21 March 2006 in Melbourne, Australia.
- Championship Record (CR): 3:57.47, Australia (Edington, Jones, Schipper, Lenton), Montreal 2005 (Jul.30.2005)

== Results ==
=== Finals ===
Place	Nation	Swimmers	Time	Note
1st	Australia	Emily Seebohm (1:00.79); Leisel Jones (1:04.94); Jessicah Schipper (57.18); Lisbeth Lenton (52.83)	3:55.74	WR
2nd	(United States) USA	Natalie Coughlin (1:00.66); Tara Kirk (1:06.37); Rachel Komisarz (57.06); Lacey Nymeyer (54.22)	3:58.31	
3rd	China	XU Tianlongzi (1:01.06); LUO Nan (1:09.08); ZHOU Yafei (57.84); XU Yanwei (53.99)	4:01.97	
4th	(United Kingdom) Great Britain	Melanie Marshall (1:01.85); Kirsty Balfour (1:07.37); Terri Dunning (59.20); Francesca Halsall (53.76)	4:02.18	
5th	Russia	Anastasia Zuyeva (1:00.85); Elena Bogomazova (1:08.11); Irina Bespalova (58.61); Olga Shulgina (55.75)	4:03.32	
6th	Japan	Reiko Nakamura (1:00.69); Asami Kitagawa (1:08.17); Ayako Doi (58.78); Maki Mita (55.69)	4:03.33	
7th	Germany	Antje Buschschulte (1:01.43); Birte Steven (1:09.46); Daniela Samulski (59.04); Britta Steffen (53.41)	4:03.34	
8th	Sweden	Carin Moller (1:03.00); Hanna Westrin (1:08.64); Gabriella Fagundez (1:00.16); Josefin Lillhage (54.36)	4:06.16	

=== Preliminaries ===
Rank	Nation	Swimmers	Time	Note
1	(United States) USA	Leila Vaziri (1:00.84), Jessica Hardy (1:07.53), Dana Vollmer (57.47), Amanda Weir (55.26)	4:01.10	Q Olympic
2	Australia	Emily Seebohm (1:01.70), Tarnee White (1:07.23), Felicity Galvez (59.12), Jodie Henry (53.96)	4:02.01	Q Olympic
3	Japan	Hanae Ito (1:01.39), Asami Kitagawa (1:08.56), Ayako Doi (58.58), Maki Mita (55.48)	4:04.01	Q Olympic
4	China	XU Tianlongzi, (1:01.66), LUO Nan (1:09.72), ZHOU Yafei (58.44), XU Yanwei (54.57)	4:04.39	Q Olympic
5	Germany	Antje Buschschulte (1:01.58), Birte Steven (1:09.47), Daniela Samulski (58.44), Britta Steffen (53.62)	4:04.62	Q Olympic
6	Sweden	Carin Moller (1:02.97), Hanna Westrin (1:08.66), Gabriella Fagundez (59.75), Josefin Lillhage (54.01)	4:05.39	Q Olympic
7	Russia	Anastasia Zuyeva (1:01.59), Elena Bogomazova (1:08.58), Irina Bespalova (58.61), Olga Shulgina (56.47)	4:05.45	Q Olympic
8	(United Kingdom) Great Britain	Elizabeth Simmonds (1:02.06), Kirsty Balfour (1:08.11), Terri Dunning (1:00.57), Melanie Marshall (55.11)	4:05.85	Q Olympic
9	France	Camille Muffat (1:04.47), Anne-Sophie Le Paranthoën (1:07.89), Alena Popchanka (58.87), Céline Couderc (54.99)	4:06.22	Olympic
10	Italy	Elena Gemo (1:02.53), Chiara Boggiatto (1:09.89), Francesca Segat (59.77), Federica Pellegrini (54.45)	4:06.64	Olympic
11	Canada	Kelly Stefanyshyn (1:02.57), Erica Morningstar (1:09.23), Mackenzie Downing (59.39), Julia Wilkinson (55.52)	4:06.71	Olympic
12	Ukraine	Iryna Amshennikova (1:02.62), Anna Khlistunova (1:07.16), Kateryna Zubkova (1:01.05), Ganna Dzerkal (56.53)	4:07.36	Olympic
13	New Zealand	Hannah McLean (1:01.68), Annabelle Carey (1:10.02), Elizabeth Coster (1:00.53), Lauren Boyle (55.39)	4:07.75	
14	Poland	Iwona Lefanowicz (1:03.61), Beata Kaminska (1:09.13), Otylia Jędrzejczak (59.45), Paulina Barzycka (56.19)	4:08.38	
15	Denmark	Louise Ørnstedt (1:02.23), Julie Hjorth-Hansen (1:10.02), Jeanette Ottesen (59.51), Micha Østergaard (56.66)	4:08.42	
16	South Africa	Karin Prinsloo (1:03.22), Suzaan van Biljon (1:09.36), Keri-Leigh Shaw (59.99), Wendy Trott (58.38)	4:10.95	
17	(South Korea) Korea	Yoo Jin Jung (1:03.68), Seul Ki Jung (1:10.64), Hae In Shin (1:01.24), Keo Ra Lee (55.99)	4:11.55	
18	Hong Kong	Hiu Wai Sherry Tsai (1:02.79), Man Yi Yvette Kong (1:13.57), Hang Yu Sze (1:01.88), Hannah Wilson (57.31)	4:15.55	
19	Venezuela	Erin Volcán (1:04.46), Daniela Victoria (1:13.20), Maria Rodriguez (1:03.79), Arlene Semeco (57.35)	4:18.80	
20	Chinese Taipei	Hsu Jung He (1:06.87), Man Hsu Lin (1:17.82), Chin Kuei Yang (1:03.65), Pin Chieh Nieh (58.69)	4:27.03	
21	Singapore	Lynette Ng (1:06.45), Roanne Ho (1:18.28), Koh Ting Ting (1:06.04), Mylene Ong (59.09)	4:29.86	
22	Macau	Weng I Kuan (1:10.47), On Kei Lei (1:16.84), Yih Shiuan Chan (1:07.48), Cheok Mei Ma (59.17)	4:33.96	
23	Uzbekistan	Maftunabonu Tuhtasinova (1:08.96), Olga Gnedovskaya (1:18.92), Galina Dukhanova (1:07.72), Irina Shlemova (59.09)	4:34.69	
24	Malta	Madeleine Scerri (1:09.91), Angela Galea (1:18.79), Davina Mangion (1:05.84), Talisa Pace (1:02.52)	4:37.06	
25	Thailand	Wenika Kaewchaiwong (1:10.65), Pannika Prachgosin (1:22.15), Nimitta Thaveesupsoonthorn (1:08.40), Jiratida Phinyosophon (59.43)	4:40.63	
26	Peru	Slavica Pavic (1:11.00), Valeria Silva (1:14.28), Fiorella Gomez-Sanchez (1:11.84), Massie Milagros Carillo (1:04.32)	4:41.44	
27	Nigeria	Uche Monu (1:18.87), Blessing Forcados (1:21.11), Obia Inyengiyikabo (1:10.39), Ngozi Monu (1:02.32)	4:52.69	
28	Jordan	Layla Alghul (1:09.52), Razan Taha (1:28.77), Hiba Bashouti (1:14.40), Miriam Hatamleh (1:03.08)	4:55.77	
--	Zambia	Patricia Wellman, Mercedes Milner, Ellen Hight, Matana Wellman	DQ	

== See also ==
- Swimming at the 2005 World Aquatics Championships – Women's 4 × 100 metre medley relay
- Swimming at the 2008 Summer Olympics – Women's 4 × 100 metre medley relay
- Swimming at the 2009 World Aquatics Championships – Women's 4 × 100 metre medley relay
