= Swimming at the 2009 World Aquatics Championships – Women's 200 metre butterfly =

The women's 200 m butterfly at the 2009 World Championships took place on 29 July (heats and semifinals) and on the evening of 30 July (finals) at the Foro Italico in Rome, Italy.

== Records ==
Prior to this competition, the existing world and competition records were as follows:

World record	Liu Zige (CHN)	2:04.18	Beijing, China	14 August 2008
Championship record	Otylia Jędrzejczak (POL)	2:05.61	Montreal, Canada	28 July 2005

The following records were established during the competition:

Date	Round	Name	Nationality	Time	Record
29 July	Heat 4	Mary DeScenza	United States	2:04.14	WR
30 July	Final	Jessicah Schipper	Australia	2:03.41	WR

== Results ==
=== Heats ===
Rank	Name	Nationality	Time	Heat	Lane	Notes
1	Mary DeScenza	United States	2:04.14	4	3	WR
2	Jessicah Schipper	Australia	2:05.50	4	4	
3	Katinka Hosszú	Hungary	2:06.21	6	6	NR
4	Samantha Hamill	Australia	2:06.32	4	6	
5	Annika Mehlhorn	Germany	2:06.45	5	1	NR
6	Aurore Mongel	France	2:06.66	5	5	
7	Audrey Lacroix	Canada	2:06.67	5	2	NR
8	Jiao Liuyang	China	2:07.01	5	4	
9	Yui Miyamoto	Japan	2:07.13	5	6	
10	Ellen Gandy	Great Britain	2:07.33	6	4	
11	Kathleen Hersey	United States	2:07.34	6	3	
12	Liu Zige	China	2:07.55	5	3	
13	Caterina Giacchetti	Italy	2:07.84	6	5	
14	Micha Kathrine Østergaard Jensen	Denmark	2:08.54	6	2	
15	Magali Rousseau	France	2:08.57	6	7	
16	Zsuzsanna Jakabos	Hungary	2:08.63	1	8	
17	Mirela Olczak	Poland	2:08.72	6	0	
18	Tanya Hunks	Canada	2:09.42	4	8	
19	Francesca Segat	Italy	2:09.54	4	7	
20	Joanna Maranhão	Brazil	2:09.55	4	1	SA
21	Yana Martynova	Russia	2:09.80	4	0	
22	Petra Granlund	Sweden	2:09.87	5	7	
23	Rita Medrano	Mexico	2:10.29	5	9	NR
24	Jessica Dickons	Great Britain	2:10.32	4	2	
25	Martina van Berkel	Switzerland	2:11.41	5	0	
26	Mireia Belmonte García	Spain	2:11.55	4	5	
27	Martina Granström	Sweden	2:11.65	6	8	
28	Katheryn Meaklim	South Africa	2:11.75	6	1	
29	Yang Chin-Kuei	Chinese Taipei	2:12.90	3	4	
30	Gráinne Murphy	Ireland	2:13.66	3	3	
31	Emilia Pikkarainen	Finland	2:13.77	4	9	
32	Tetyana Khala	Ukraine	2:13.98	6	9	
33	Yumisleisy Morales Mendoza	Cuba	2:14.00	3	7	NR
34	Paula Zukowska	Poland	2:14.09	3	5	
35	Barbora Závadová	Czech Republic	2:14.83	3	8	
36	Lynette Lim	Singapore	2:15.82	2	2	
37	Nina Dittrich	Austria	2:15.95	5	8	
38	Erica Cirila Totten	Philippines	2:16.13	3	9	
39	Yasemin Rosenberger	Turkey	2:16.24	3	2	
40	Kristina Bernice Lennox	Puerto Rico	2:17.56	3	1	
41	Maida Turnadzic	Bosnia and Herzegovina	2:18.09	3	6	
42	Eliana Barrios	Venezuela	2:18.14	3	0	
43	Simona Muccioli	San Marino	2:19.84	2	4	
44	Ting Sheng-Yo	Chinese Taipei	2:21.05	1	4	
45	Koh Ting Ting	Singapore	2:21.31	2	5	
46	Maria Coy	Guatemala	2:21.37	2	3	
47	Laura lucia Paz Chavez	Honduras	2:21.47	2	9	
48	Aiste Dobrovolskaite	Lithuania	2:22.48	2	0	
49	Karrakchou Lilia	Morocco	2:23.32	2	8	
50	Davina Mangion	Malta	2:24.39	1	6	
51	Vandita Dhariyal	India	2:25.07	1	2	
52	Pooja Raghava Alva	India	2:25.08	1	3	
53	Ana Euceda Gutierrez	Honduras	2:25.51	1	5	
54	Ramond Sherazad	Morocco	2:26.69	2	1	
55	Daniela Reyes Hinrichsen	Chile	2:27.49	2	7	
56	Miniruwani Samarakoon	Sri Lanka	2:39.21	1	7	
57	Tieri Erasito	Fiji	2:45.20	1	1	

=== Semifinals ===
Rank	Name	Nationality	Time	Heat	Lane	Notes
1	Katinka Hosszú	Hungary	2:04.27	2	5	ER
2	Mary DeScenza	United States	2:04.33	2	4	
3	Jessicah Schipper	Australia	2:04.87	1	4	OC
4	Jiao Liuyang	China	2:04.96	1	6	
5	Aurore Mongel	France	2:05.09	1	3	NR
6	Liu Zige	China	2:05.29	1	7	
7	Samantha Hamill	Australia	2:05.99	1	5	
8	Audrey Lacroix	Canada	2:06.85	2	6	
9	Kathleen Hersey	United States	2:06.89	2	7	
10	Annika Mehlhorn	Germany	2:07.43	2	3	
11	Micha Kathrine Østergaard Jensen	Denmark	2:07.44	1	1	NR
12	Caterina Giacchetti	Italy	2:07.59	2	1	
13	Yui Miyamoto	Japan	2:08.13	2	2	
14	Zsuzsanna Jakabos	Hungary	2:08.34	1	8	
15	Ellen Gandy	Great Britain	2:08.55	1	2	
16	Magali Rousseau	France	2:08.94	2	8	

=== Finals ===
Rank	Name	Nationality	Time	Lane	Notes
1st place, gold medalist(s)	Jessicah Schipper	Australia	2:03.41	3	WR
2nd place, silver medalist(s)	Liu Zige	China	2:03.90	7	AS
3rd place, bronze medalist(s)	Katinka Hosszú	Hungary	2:04.28	4	
4	Mary Descenza	United States	2:04.41	5	
5	Jiao Liuyang	China	2:04.50	6	
6	Aurore Mongel	France	2:05.48	2	
7	Audrey Lacroix	Canada	2:05.95	8	NR
8	Samantha Hamill	Australia	2:06.11	1	

== See also ==
- Swimming at the 2007 World Aquatics Championships – Women's 200 metre butterfly
- Swimming at the 2008 Summer Olympics – Women's 200 metre butterfly
