= 2014 Pan Pacific Swimming Championships – Women's 200 metre butterfly =

Women's 200 metre breaststroke at the 2014 Pan Pacific Swimming Championships
- Venue: Gold Coast Aquatic Centre
- Dates: August 21, 2014 (heats & finals)
- Competitors: 15
- Winning time: 2:08.22

Medalists
gold medal	Cammile Adams	United States
silver medal	Natsumi Hoshi	Japan
bronze medal	Katie McLaughlin	United States

The women's 200 metre butterfly competition at the 2014 Pan Pacific Swimming Championships took place on August 21 at the Gold Coast Aquatic Centre. The last champion was Jessicah Schipper of Australia.

This race consisted of four lengths of the pool, all lengths being in butterfly stroke.

== Records ==
Prior to this competition, the existing world and Pan Pacific records were as follows:

World record	Liu Zige (CHN)	2:01.81	Jinan, China	October 21, 2009
Pan Pacific Championships record	Jessicah Schipper (AUS)	2:05.40	Victoria, Canada	August 17, 2006

== Results ==
All times are in minutes and seconds.

KEY:	q	Fastest non-qualifiers	Q	Qualified	CR	Championships record	NR	National record	PB	Personal best	SB	Seasonal best

=== Heats ===
The first round was held on August 21, at 11:36.

Rank	Name	Nationality	Time	Notes
1	Katie McLaughlin	United States	2:08.02	QA
2	Cammile Adams	United States	2:08.22	QA
3	Hali Flickinger	United States	2:08.33	QA
4	Audrey Lacroix	Canada	2:08.82	QA
5	Natsumi Hoshi	Japan	2:09.11	QA
6	Miyu Nakano	Japan	2:09.21	QA
7	Sakiko Shimizu	Japan	2:09.66	QA
8	Andreina Pinto	Venezuela	2:10.17	QA
9	Maya DiRado	United States	2:11.33	QB
10	Katerine Savard	Canada	2:11.77	QB
11	Caitlin Leverenz	United States	2:11.83	QB
12	Madeline Groves	Australia	2:13.24	QB
13	Samantha Lee	New Zealand	2:13.85	QB
14	Vanessa Mohr	South Africa	2:19.05	QB
15	Hang Yu Sze	Hong Kong	2:21.64	QB

=== B Final ===
The B final was held on August 21, at 20:59.

Rank	Name	Nationality	Time	Notes
9	Maya DiRado	United States	2:07.42	
10	Hali Flickinger	United States	2:08.81	
11	Sakiko Shimizu	Japan	2:10.06	
12	Caitlin Leverenz	United States	2:11.64	
13	Samantha Lee	New Zealand	2:13.08	
14	Vanessa Mohr	South Africa	2:19.19	

=== A Final ===
The A final was held on August 21, at 20:59.

Rank	Name	Nationality	Time	Notes
1st place, gold medalist(s)	Cammile Adams	United States	2:06.61	
2nd place, silver medalist(s)	Natsumi Hoshi	Japan	2:06.68	
3rd place, bronze medalist(s)	Katie McLaughlin	United States	2:07.08	
4	Miyu Nakano	Japan	2:08.54	
5	Audrey Lacroix	Canada	2:08.81	
6	Katerine Savard	Canada	2:09.42	
7	Madeline Groves	Australia	2:10.15	
8	Andreina Pinto	Venezuela	2:13.28	
