= 2010 Pan Pacific Swimming Championships – Women's 200 metre butterfly =

Women's 200 metre butterfly at the 2010 Pan Pacific Swimming Championships
- Venue: William Woollett Jr. Aquatics Center
- Dates: August 18, 2010 (heats & finals)
- Competitors: 17 from 7 nations
- Winning time: 2:06.90

Medalists
gold medal	Jessicah Schipper	Australia
silver medal	Teresa Crippen	United States
bronze medal	Kathleen Hersey	United States

The women's 200 metre butterfly competition at the 2010 Pan Pacific Swimming Championships took place on August 18 at the William Woollett Jr. Aquatics Center. The last champion was Jessicah Schipper of Australia.

This race consisted of four lengths of the pool, all lengths being in butterfly stroke.

== Records ==
Prior to this competition, the existing world and Pan Pacific records were as follows:

World record	Liu Zige (CHN)	2:01.81	Jinan, China	October 21, 2009
Pan Pacific Championships record	Jessicah Schipper (AUS)	2:05.40	Victoria, Canada	August 17, 2006

== Results ==
All times are in minutes and seconds.

KEY:	q	Fastest non-qualifiers	Q	Qualified	CR	Championships record	NR	National record	PB	Personal best	SB	Seasonal best

=== Heats ===
The first round was held on August 18, at 11:09.

Rank	Heat	Lane	Name	Nationality	Time	Notes
1	3	5	Teresa Crippen	United States	2:07.03	QA
2	1	4	Kathleen Hersey	United States	2:08.03	QA
3	2	3	Audrey Lacroix	Canada	2:08.20	QA
4	2	4	Natsumi Hoshi	Japan	2:08.25	QA
5	2	5	Samantha Hamill	Australia	2:08.30	QA
6	1	5	Mary Mohler	United States	2:09.18	QA
7	3	4	Jessicah Schipper	Australia	2:09.52	QA
8	3	2	Yurie Yano	Japan	2:09.85	QA
9	3	6	MacKenzie Downing	Canada	2:10.23	QB
10	2	6	Hiroko Sugino	Japan	2:10.43	QB
11	1	6	Katerine Savard	Canada	2:12.39	QB
12	3	3	Joanna Maranhão	Brazil	2:12.42	QB
13	2	2	Tomoyo Fukuda	Japan	2:13.93	QB
14	1	3	Park Na-Ri	South Korea	2:15.57	QB
15	1	2	Carmen Nam	Hong Kong	2:18.17	QB
16	3	7	Larissa Cieslak	Brazil	2:21.20	QB
17	2	7	Manuella Lyrio	Brazil	2:21.98	

=== B Final ===
The B final was held on August 18, at 19:35.

Rank	Lane	Name	Nationality	Time	Notes
9	4	Mary Mohler	United States	2:09.31	
10	5	Hiroko Sugino	Japan	2:10.37	
11	3	Katerine Savard	Canada	2:11.98	
12	6	Joanna Maranhão	Brazil	2:12.09	
13	8	Tomoyo Fukuda	Japan	2:16.37	
14	2	Park Na-Ri	South Korea	2:16.40	
15	7	Carmen Nam	Hong Kong	2:18.98	
16	1	Larissa Cieslak	Brazil	2:20.28	

=== A Final ===
The A final was held on August 18, at 19:35.

Rank	Lane	Name	Nationality	Time	Notes
1st place, gold medalist(s)	7	Jessicah Schipper	Australia	2:06.90	
2nd place, silver medalist(s)	4	Teresa Crippen	United States	2:06.93	
3rd place, bronze medalist(s)	5	Kathleen Hersey	United States	2:07.27	
4	3	Audrey Lacroix	Canada	2:08.32	
5	6	Natsumi Hoshi	Japan	2:08.49	
6	2	Samantha Hamill	Australia	2:09.23	
7	8	MacKenzie Downing	Canada	2:11.39	
8	1	Yurie Yano	Japan	2:12.91	
