= Swimming at the 2005 World Aquatics Championships – Women's 4 × 100 metre medley relay =

Women's 4×100m Medley Relay at the 2005 FINA World Aquatics Championships
- Dates: July 30, 2005
- Competitors: 21
- Winning time: 3 minutes 57.47 seconds

Medalists
gold medal	Australia
silver medal	United States
bronze medal	Germany

The Women's 4x100 Medley Relay event at the 11th FINA World Aquatics Championships swam on 30 July 2005 in Montreal, Canada.

At the start of the event, the existing World (WR) and Championships (CR) records were:

- WR: 3:57.32 swum by Australia on 21 August 2004 in Athens, Greece
- CR: 3:59.89 swum by China on 26 July 2003 in Barcelona, Spain

== Results ==
=== Final ===
Place	Nation	Swimmers	Time	Notes
1	Australia	Sophie Edington (1:01.48), Leisel Jones (1:05.73), Jessicah Schipper (57.13), Libby Lenton (53.13)	3:57.47	CR
2	USA	Natalie Coughlin (1:00.00), Jessica Hardy (1:07.70), Rachel Komisarz (57.80), Amanda Weir (54.42)	3:59.92	
3	Germany	Antje Buschschulte (1:00.72), Sarah Poewe (1:08.51), Annika Mehlhorn (58.75), Daniela Götz (54.53)	4:02.51	
4	China	Chen Yanyan (1:02.18), Xuejuan Luo (1:08.17), Yafei Zhou (58.53), Yingwen Zhu (53.92)	4:02.80	
5	Italy	Alessia Filippi (1:02.34), Chiara Boggiatto (1:08.45), Ambra Migliori (59.45), Federica Pellegrini (54.66)	4:04.90	
6	Poland	Katarzyna Staszak (1:03.17), Beata Kaminska (1:08.38), Otylia Jędrzejczak (58.39), Paulina Barzycka (55.14)	4:05.08	
7	Japan	Reiko Nakamura (1:01.62), Sayaka Nakamura (1:09.81), Yuko Nakanishi (59.55), Norie Urabe (55.87)	4:06.85	
--	Russia	Stanislava Komarova (1:02.27), Ekaterina Kormatcheva (1:08.73), Natalia Sutiagina (DQ), Daria Beliakina	DQ	

=== Preliminaries ===
Rank	Heat+Lane	Nation	Swimmers	Time	Notes
1	H3 L4	Australia	Giaan Rooney (1:02.26), Brooke Hanson (1:07.94), Felicity Galvez (59.39), Jodie Henry (54.03)	4:03.62	q
2	H2 L4	United States	Jeri Moss (1:02.54), Tara Kirk (1:07.90), Mary DeScenza (58.63), Lacey Nymeyer (55.36)	4:04.43	q
3	H1 L4	Germany	Antje Buschschulte (1:01.95), Sarah Poewe (1:09.09), Annika Mehlhorn (59.04), Daniela Götz (55.42)	4:05.50	q
4	H3 L2	Italy	Alessia Filippi (1:03.02), Chiara Boggiatto (1:08.14), Ambra Migliori (59.80), Federica Pellegrini (54.67)	4:05.63	q
5	H1 L6	Russia	Stanislava Komarova (1:02.26), Ekaterina Kormatcheva (1:08.99), Natalia Sutiagina (59.46), Daria Beliakina (55.66)	4:06.37	q
6	H3 L5	China	Jing Zhao (1:02.90), Xuejuan Luo (1:10.26), Yafei Zhou (59.30), Yingwen Zhu (54.23)	4:06.69	q
7	H3 L8	Poland	Katarzyna Staszak (1:04.08), Katarzyna Dulian (1:08.75), Otylia Jędrzejczak (58.55), Paulina Barzycka (55.33)	4:06.74	q
8	H2 5L	Japan	Mai Nakamura (1:02.53), Sayaka Nakamura (1:09.89), Yuko Nakanishi (59.68), Norie Urabe (55.22)	4:07.32	q
9	H2 L3	Netherlands	Hinkelien Schreuder (1:03.76), Madelon Baans (1:09.59), Inge Dekker (58.69), Chantal Groot (55.35)	4:07.39	
10	H1 L5	Great Britain	Katy Sexton (1:02.45), Kate Haywood (1:08.68), Rosalind Brett (1:01.16), Melanie Marshall (55.42)	4:07.71	
11	H3 L6	New Zealand	Hannah McLean (1:01.53), Annabelle Carey (1:10.73), Elizabeth Coster (1:00.36), Alison Fitch (55.39)	4:08.01	
12	H2 L6	Canada	Erin Gammel (1:02.77), Christin Petelski (1:10.07), Audrey Lacroix (1:00.51), Sophie Simard (55.40)	4:08.75	
13	H3 L7	Sweden	Therese Svendsen (1:04.22), Josefin Wede (1:09.85), Gabriella Fagundez (1:00.23), Josefin Lillhage (55.13)	4:09.43	
14	H3 L3	Spain	Duane Rocha (1:03.53), Sara Pérez (1:10.78), Mireia García (1:00.78), Tatiana Rouba (56.03)	4:11.12	
15	H1 L3	Denmark	Louise Ørnstedt (1:02.03), Julie Hjorth-Hansen (1:11.61), Jeanette Ottesen (1:00.65), Annette Hansen (57.25)	4:11.54	
16	H2 L2	South Africa	Melissa Corfe (1:04.73), Suzaan van Biljon (1:09.35), Mandy Loots (1:00.03), Chanelle Van Wyk (58.10)	4:12.21	
17	H L	South Korea	Yoo Jin Jung (1:04.51), Seul-Ki Jung (1:11.70), You-Ri Kwon (1:02.56), Keo Ra Lee (57.07)	4:15.84	
18	H L	Czech Republic	Petra Klosová (1:04.49), Petra Chocová (1:11.33), Lenka Jarosova (1:04.53), Jana Myšková (56.85)	4:17.20	
19	H L	Chinese Taipei	Man-Hsu Lin (1:06.46), Yu-Chia Tong (1:13.63), Chin-Kuei Yang (1:03.67), Pin-Chieh Nieh (58.22)	4:21.98	
20	H L	Singapore	Lynette Ng (1:07.85), Nicolette Teo (1:14.53), Bernadette Lee (1:03.85), Joscelin Yeo (57.41)	4:23.64	
21	H1 L1	Macau	Man Wai Fong (1:12.38), Sin Ian Lei (1:20.98), Cheok Mei Ma (1:07.74), Weng I Kuan (1:02.62)	4:43.72	
--	--	Slovenia		DNS	
