= Swimming at the 2006 Commonwealth Games – Women's 200 metre butterfly =

== Women's 200 m Butterfly - Final ==
The Women's 200m Butterfly Final were held on 21 March at 7:07pm.

Pos.	Lane	Athlete	R.T.	50 m	100 m	150 m	200 m	Tbh.
	4	Jessicah Schipper (AUS)	0.68	28.25 [1] 28.25	59.96 [1] 31.71	1:32.90 [1] 32.94	2:06.09 (GR); 33.19	
	6	Felicity Galvez (AUS)	0.83	28.60 [2] 28.60	1:01.32 [2] 32.72	1:34.35 [2] 33.03	2:08.16; 33.81	2.07
	5	Terri Dunning (ENG)	0.82	29.22 [5] 29.22	1:01.93 [4] 32.71	1:35.22 [3] 33.29	2:09.87; 34.65	3.78
4	3	Audrey Lacroix (CAN)	0.69	28.92 [3] 28.92	1:01.84 [3] 32.92	1:35.28 [4] 33.44	2:09.96; 34.68	3.87
5	2	Mandy Loots (RSA)	0.71	29.19 [4] 29.19	1:02.46 [5] 33.27	1:36.91 [5] 34.45	2:12.40; 35.49	6.31
6	7	Jemma Lowe (WAL)	0.77	30.01 [7] 30.01	1:04.08 [6] 34.07	1:38.47 [6] 34.39	2:13.75; 35.28	7.66
7	1	Tao Li (SIN)	0.68	29.89 [6] 29.89	1:04.49 [8] 34.60	1:40.01 [8] 35.52	2:15.85; 35.84	9.76
8	8	Bethan Coole (WAL)	0.77	30.11 [8] 30.11	1:04.36 [7] 34.25	1:39.27 [7] 34.91	2:15.93; 36.66	9.84

== Women's 200 m Butterfly - Heats ==
The Women's 200m Butterfly Heats were held on 21 March at 10:00am.

=== Women's 200 m Butterfly - Heat 01 ===
Pos.	Lane	Athlete	R.T.	50 m	100 m	150 m	200 m	Tbh.
1	5	Terri Dunning (ENG)	0.81	29.55 [2] 29.55	1:02.70 [1] 33.15	1:36.34 [1] 33.64	2:10.46; 34.12	
2	4	Felicity Galvez (AUS)	0.88	29.33 [1] 29.33	1:02.91 [2] 33.58	1:37.19 [2] 34.28	2:11.44; 34.25	0.98
3	3	Mandy Loots (RSA)	0.71	29.68 [3] 29.68	1:03.19 [3] 33.51	1:37.73 [3] 34.54	2:13.14; 35.41	2.68
4	6	Bethan Coole (WAL)	0.76	30.75 [4] 30.75	1:04.77 [4] 34.02	1:39.54 [4] 34.77	2:16.03; 36.49	5.57
DNS	2	Sophie Simard (CAN)						

=== Women's 200 m Butterfly - Heat 02 ===
Pos.	Lane	Athlete	R.T.	50 m	100 m	150 m	200 m	Tbh.
1	4	Jessicah Schipper (AUS)	0.67	28.42 [1] 28.42	1:01.42 [1] 33.00	1:35.74 [1] 34.32	2:09.77; 34.03	
2	5	Audrey Lacroix (CAN)	0.77	29.75 [2] 29.75	1:03.24 [2] 33.49	1:36.94 [2] 33.70	2:10.94; 34.00	1.17
3	6	Jemma Lowe (WAL)	0.76	30.23 [4] 30.23	1:03.89 [3] 33.66	1:37.84 [3] 33.95	2:14.04; 36.20	4.27
4	2	Tao Li (SIN)	0.68	30.20 [3] 30.20	1:05.36 [5] 35.16	1:40.93 [5] 35.57	2:15.49; 34.56	5.72
5	3	Kylie Palmer (AUS)	0.73	30.30 [5] 30.30	1:05.28 [4] 34.98	1:40.62 [4] 35.34	2:16.14; 35.52	6.37
6	7	Angela Galea (MLT)	0.80	31.79 [6] 31.79	1:07.65 [6] 35.86	1:44.23 [6] 36.58	2:20.73; 36.50	10.96
