= Swimming at the 2006 Commonwealth Games – Women's 4 × 100 metre medley relay =

The Women's 4 × 100 m Medley Relay at the 2006 Commonwealth Games occurred on Tuesday, 21 March 2006 at the Melbourne Sports and Aquatic Centre in Melbourne, Australia. It was the second-to-last event of the swimming program at the Games, and the last women's event (the final event was the Men's 4x100 Medley Relay).

As 8 teams were entered in the event, it was only swum in finals.

Records at the start of the competition were:

- World Record (WR): 3:57.32, Australia, 21 August 2004, Athens Greece
- Games Record (GR): 4:03.70, Australia, Manchester 2002.

== Results ==
Place	Nation	Swimmers	Time	Notes
1	Australia	Sophie Edington (1:01.06); Leisel Jones (1:05.51); Jessicah Schipper (56.86); Lisbeth Lenton (52.87)	3:56.30	WR
2	England	Melanie Marshall (1:01.64); Kate Haywood (1:08.54); Terri Dunning (59.40); Francesca Halsall (55.03)	4:04.61	
3	Canada	Kelly Stefanyshyn (1:02.26); Lauren van Oosten (1:09.53); Audrey Lacroix (59.27); Erica Morningstar (54.89)	4:05.95	
4	New Zealand	Hannah McLean (1:00.83) GR; Annabelle Carey (1:09.73); Elizabeth Coster (1:00.06); Alison Fitch (55.68)	4:06.30	NR
5	South Africa	Melissa Corfe (1:03.39); Suzaan van Biljon (1:08.53); Mandy Loots (59.65); Lauren Roets (55.03)	4:06.60	
6	Scotland	Lorna Smith (1:05.54); Kirsty Balfour (1:08.11); Stephanie Hill (1:02.47); Caitlin McClatchey (55.88)	4:12.00	
7	Singapore	Hiang Yuet Ng (1:06.13); Joscelin Yeo (1:11.32); Li Tao (1:01.39); Mylene Ong (58.46)	4:17.30	
8	Sri Lanka	Prabha Dharmadasa (1:17.47); Mayumi Raheem (1:21.00); Migali Gunatilake (1:16.62); Chathuri Abeykoon (1:08.56)	5:03.65	

== See also ==
- Swimming at the 2010 Commonwealth Games – Women's 4 × 100 metre medley relay
