= 2006 Pan Pacific Swimming Championships – Women's 200 metre butterfly =

Women's 200 metre butterfly at the 2006 Pan Pacific Swimming Championships
- Venue: Saanich Commonwealth Place; Saanich, British Columbia, Canada
- Dates: August 17, 2006 (heats & finals)
- Competitors: 16 from 6 nations
- Winning time: 2:05.40

Medalists
gold medal	Jessicah Schipper	Australia
silver medal	Yuko Nakanishi	Japan
bronze medal	Yurie Yano	Japan

The women's 200 metre butterfly competition at the 2006 Pan Pacific Swimming Championships took place on August 17 at the Saanich Commonwealth Place. The last champion was Petria Thomas of Australia.

This race consisted of four lengths of the pool, all lengths being in butterfly stroke.

== Records ==
Prior to this competition, the existing world and Pan Pacific records were as follows:

World record	Otylia Jędrzejczak (POL)	2:05.61	Montreal, Quebec, Canada	July 28, 2005
Pan Pacific Championships record	Susie O'Neill (AUS)	2:06.53	Sydney, Australia	August 25, 1999

== Results ==
All times are in minutes and seconds.

KEY:	q	Fastest non-qualifiers	Q	Qualified	CR	Championships record	NR	National record	PB	Personal best	SB	Seasonal best

=== Heats ===
The first round was held on August 17, at 10:57.

Rank	Heat	Lane	Name	Nationality	Time	Notes
1	2	4	Jessicah Schipper	Australia	2:07.85	QA
2	2	3	Mary Descenza	United States	2:09.40	QA
3	1	4	Yurie Yano	Japan	2:09.59	QA
4	2	5	Kim Vandenberg	United States	2:09.71	QA
5	1	3	Stephanie Rice	Australia	2:10.22	QA
6	1	5	Yuko Nakanishi	Japan	2:10.27	QA
7	1	2	Audrey Lacroix	Canada	2:10.36	QA
8	2	2	MacKenzie Downing	Canada	2:10.76	QA
9	1	6	Choi Hye-Ra	South Korea	2:10.90	QB
10	2	6	Kathleen Hersey	United States	2:10.97	QB
11	1	1	Teresa Crippen	United States	2:12.25	QB
12	2	7	Shin Hae-In	South Korea	2:13.23	QB
13	2	1	Kayla Rawlings	Canada	2:15.62	QB
14	1	7	Kylie Palmer	Australia	2:17.34	QB
15	1	8	Joanna Maranhão	Brazil	2:17.99	QB
16	2	8	Melanie Dodds	Canada	2:18.92	QB

=== B Final ===
The B final was held on August 17, at 19:46.

Rank	Lane	Name	Nationality	Time	Notes
9	4	Choi Hye-Ra	South Korea	2:10.32	
10	5	Kathleen Hersey	United States	2:10.49	
11	7	Teresa Crippen	United States	2:10.84	
12	6	Kayla Rawlings	Canada	2:15.15	
13	3	Shin Hae-In	South Korea	2:16.17	
14	2	Joanna Maranhão	Brazil	2:16.80	
15	1	Melanie Dodds	Canada	2:18.78	

=== A Final ===
The A final was held on August 17, at 19:46.

Rank	Lane	Name	Nationality	Time	Notes
1st place, gold medalist(s)	4	Jessicah Schipper	Australia	2:05.40	WR
2nd place, silver medalist(s)	7	Yuko Nakanishi	Japan	2:06.52	
3rd place, bronze medalist(s)	3	Yurie Yano	Japan	2:07.86	
4	5	Mary Descenza	United States	2:09.07	
5	2	Stephanie Rice	Australia	2:09.54	
6	6	Kim Vandenberg	United States	2:09.83	
7	8	MacKenzie Downing	Canada	2:10.53	
8	1	Audrey Lacroix	Canada	2:10.96	
