= Swimming at the 2010 Commonwealth Games – Women's 200 metre butterfly =

The Women's 200 metre butterfly event at the 2010 Commonwealth Games took place on 9 October 2010, at the SPM Swimming Pool Complex.

Two heats were held. The heat in which a swimmer competed did not formally matter for advancement, as the swimmers with the top eight times from the entire field qualified for the finals.

== Heats ==
=== Heat 1 ===
Rank	Lane	Name	Nationality	Time	Notes
1	5	Audrey Lacroix	Canada	2:09.63	Q
2	4	Ellen Gandy	England	2:10.35	Q
3	6	Jessica Dickons	England	2:11.43	Q
4	3	Felicity Galvez	Australia	2:13.57	Q
5	2	Alys Thomas	Wales	2:14.84	
6	1	Pooja Alva	India	2:24.74	
7	8	Aditi Dhumatkar	India	2:29.86	
–	7	Anna Schegelova	Cyprus		DNS

=== Heat 2 ===
Rank	Lane	Name	Nationality	Time	Notes
1	4	Jessicah Schipper	Australia	2:08.70	Q
2	5	Samantha Hamill	Australia	2:09.69	Q
3	6	MacKenzie Downing	Canada	2:10.04	Q
4	3	Jemma Lowe	Wales	2:10.47	Q
5	7	Anne Bochmann	England	2:17.29	
6	2	Katerine Savard	Canada	2:18.33	
7	1	Bethany Carson	Northern Ireland	2:21.87	
–	8	Shannon Austin	Seychelles	2:36.33	

== Final ==
Rank	Lane	Name	Nationality	Time	Notes
1st place, gold medalist(s)	4	Jessicah Schipper	Australia	2:07.04	
2nd place, silver medalist(s)	5	Audrey Lacroix	Canada	2:07.31	
3rd place, bronze medalist(s)	2	Ellen Gandy	England	2:07.75	
4	3	Samantha Hamill	Australia	2:07.84	
5	7	Jemma Lowe	Wales	2:08.28	
6	6	MacKenzie Downing	Canada	2:11.05	
7	1	Jessica Dickons	England	2:11.24	
8	8	Felicity Galvez	Australia	2:13.19	
