= 2006 Pan Pacific Swimming Championships – Women's 100 metre butterfly =

Women's 100 metre butterfly at the 2006 Pan Pacific Swimming Championships
- Venue: Saanich Commonwealth Place
- Dates: August 19, 2006 (heats & finals)
- Competitors: 26 from 8 nations
- Winning time: 57.30

Medalists
gold medal	Jessicah Schipper	Australia
silver medal	Rachel Komisarz	United States
bronze medal	Mary Descenza	United States

The women's 100 metre butterfly competition at the 2006 Pan Pacific Swimming Championships took place on August 19 at the Saanich Commonwealth Place. The last champion was Natalie Coughlin of US.

This race consisted of two lengths of the pool, all in butterfly.

== Records ==
Prior to this competition, the existing world and Pan Pacific records were as follows:

World record	Inge de Bruijn (NED)	56.61	Sydney, Australia	September 17, 2000
Pan Pacific Championships record	Jenny Thompson (USA); Natalie Coughlin (USA)	57.88	Sydney, Australia; Yokohama, Japan	August 22, 1999; August 23, 2002

== Results ==
All times are in minutes and seconds.

KEY:	q	Fastest non-qualifiers	Q	Qualified	CR	Championships record	NR	National record	PB	Personal best	SB	Seasonal best

=== Heats ===
The first round was held on August 19, at 10:45.

Rank	Heat	Lane	Name	Nationality	Time	Notes
1	4	4	Jessicah Schipper	Australia	58.26	QA
2	2	4	Rachel Komisarz	United States	59.16	QA
3	4	5	Mary Descenza	United States	59.26	QA
4	4	6	MacKenzie Downing	Canada	59.43	QA
5	4	3	Ayako Doi	Japan	59.58	QA
6	3	5	Yuko Nakanishi	Japan	59.72	QA
7	3	1	Whitney Myers	United States	59.91	QA
8	3	3	Dana Vollmer	United States	1:00.06	QA
9	4	2	Shin Hae-In	South Korea	1:00.23	QB
10	3	6	Kathleen Hersey	United States	1:00.37	QB
11	2	3	Audrey Lacroix	Canada	1:00.39	QB
12	2	5	Stephanie Rice	Australia	1:00.51	QB
13	3	7	Choi Hye-Ra	South Korea	1:00.59	QB
14	3	2	Kim Vandenberg	United States	1:00.64	QB
15	2	2	Yurie Yano	Japan	1:00.68	QB
16	2	6	Liz Coster	New Zealand	1:01.59	QB
17	3	8	Fabíola Molina	Brazil	1:01.81	
18	2	1	Stephanie Horner	Canada	1:01.87	
19	2	7	Courtney Cashion	United States	1:02.11	
20	4	7	Hannah Wilson	Hong Kong	1:02.31	
21	4	1	Genevieve Saumur	Canada	1:02.42	
22	4	8	Sze Hang Yu	Hong Kong	1:02.62	
23	1	3	Seanna Mitchell	Canada	1:02.75	
24	2	8	Kayla Rawlings	Canada	1:02.77	
25	1	5	Jessica Hardy	United States	1:03.81	
26	1	4	Melanie Dodds	Canada	1:03.87	
-	3	4	Natalie Coughlin	United States	DSQ	

=== B Final ===
The B final was held on August 19, at 18:45.

Rank	Lane	Name	Nationality	Time	Notes
9	5	Stephanie Rice	Australia	59.20	
10	4	Whitney Myers	United States	59.35	
11	6	Yurie Yano	Japan	1:00.54	
12	3	Choi Hye-Ra	South Korea	1:00.67	
13	2	Liz Coster	New Zealand	1:01.46	
14	7	Fabíola Molina	Brazil	1:01.67	
15	1	Stephanie Horner	Canada	1:01.98	
16	8	Hannah Wilson	Hong Kong	1:02.04	

=== A Final ===
The A final was held on August 19, at 18:45.

Rank	Lane	Name	Nationality	Time	Notes
1st place, gold medalist(s)	4	Jessicah Schipper	Australia	57.30	CR
2nd place, silver medalist(s)	5	Rachel Komisarz	United States	58.75	
3rd place, bronze medalist(s)	3	Mary Descenza	United States	59.03	
4	7	Yuko Nakanishi	Japan	59.13	
5	2	Ayako Doi	Japan	59.45	
6	6	MacKenzie Downing	Canada	59.76	
7	8	Audrey Lacroix	Canada	59.95	
8	1	Shin Hae-In	South Korea	1:00.00	
