= Swimming at the 2009 World Aquatics Championships – Women's 4 × 100 metre medley relay =

The Women's 4x100m Medley Relay at the 2009 World Aquatics Championships took place on August 1, 2009 at the Foro Italico in Rome, Italy.

== Records ==
Prior to this competition, the existing world and competition records were as follows:

World Record	Australia (AUS); Emily Seebohm (59.33); Leisel Jones (1:04.58); Jessicah Schipper (56.25); Libby Trickett (52.53)	3:52.69	Beijing, China	17 August 2008
Championship Record	Australia (AUS); Emily Seebohm (1:00.79); Leisel Jones (1:04.94); Jessicah Schipper (57.18); Libby Trickett (52.83)	3:55.74	Melbourne, Australia	31 March 2007

The following records were established during the competition:

Date	Event	Name	Nation	Time	Record
1 August	Final	Zhao Jing (58.98); Chen Huijia (1:04.12); Jiao Liuyang (56.28); Li Zhesi (52.81)	China (CHN)	3:52.19	WR

== Results ==
=== Heats ===
Rank	Heat	Lane	Nation	Swimmers	Time	Notes
1	2	4	China	Zhao Jing (1:00.24); Chen Huijia (1:05.04); Jiao Liuyang (56.92); Li Zhesi (53.94)	3:56.14	
2	2	5	Japan	Shiho Sakai (59.47); Nanaka Tamura (1:06.55); Yuka Kato (57.45); Haruka Ueda (53.97)	3:57.44	NR
3	2	3	Germany	Daniela Samulski (1:00.16); Sarah Poewe (1:06.74); Annika Mehlhorn (57.36); Daniela Schreiber (53.49)	3:57.75	NR
4	2	6	Netherlands	Femke Heemskerk (1:01.28) NR; Lia Dekker (1:07.41); Inge Dekker (56.95); Ranomi Kromowidjojo (52.41)	3:58.05	NR
5	4	5	Great Britain	Gemma Spofforth (59.58); Lowri Tynan (1:07.51); Ellen Gandy (57.80); Francesca Halsall (53.29)	3:58.18	
6	4	3	Canada	Julia Wilkinson (1:00.69); Annamay Pierse (1:06.10); Audrey Lacroix (57.70); Geneviève Saumur (53.74)	3:58.23	NR
7	4	4	Australia	Emily Seebohm (59.65); Sally Foster (1:07.32); Stephanie Rice (57.29); Shayne Reese (54.10)	3:58.36	
8	4	6	Brazil	Fabíola Molina (1:00.08) SA; Carolina Mussi (1:08.31); Gabriella Silva (56.25); Tatiana Lemos (53.85)	3:58.49	SA
9	3	2	Denmark	Pernille Jessing Larsen (1:01.63); Rikke Møller Pedersen (1:06.59); Micha Kathrine Østergaard Jensen (57.82); Jeanette Ottesen (52.89)	3:58.93	NR
10	3	4	United States	Elizabeth Pelton (1:00.78); Kasey Carlson (1:06.79); Christine Magnuson (57.29); Julia Smit (54.15)	3:59.01	
11	3	3	Sweden	Sarah Sjöström (1:00.74) NR; Joline Höstman (1:08.27); Gabriella Fagundez (58.44); Josefin Lillhage (53.59)	4:01.04	NR
12	3	6	France	Esther Baron (1:01.53); Fanny Babou (1:08.44); Aurore Mongel (57.69); Malia Metella (53.39)	4:01.05	NR
13	3	5	Russia	Maria Gromova (1:00.33); Valentina Artemyeva (1:08.30); Irina Bespalova (57.64); Olga Klyuchnikova (54.82)	4:01.09	
14	4	7	Hungary	Eszter Dara (1:01.07); Réka Pecz (1:09.53); Katinka Hosszú (59.34); Evelyn Verrasztó (53.69)	4:03.63	NR
15	1	4	Czech Republic	Simona Baumrtova (1:01.56); Petra Chocova (1:08.30); Lenka Jarosova (1:01.42); Petra Klosova (55.15)	4:06.43	NR
16	1	7	Ukraine	Daryna Zevina (1:02.34); Anna Khlistunova (1:10.35); Kateryna Zubkova (59.70); Dar'ya Stepanyuk (54.98)	4:07.37	
17	2	2	Poland	Alicja Tchorz (1:01.53); Ewa Scieszko (1:09.67); Mirela Olczak (1:01.17); Katarzyna Wilk (55.44)	4:07.81	
18	1	2	Norway	Katharina Stiberg (1:04.37); Sara Nordenstam (1:10.54); Ingvild Snildal (57.02); Henriette Brekke (56.31)	4:08.24	NR
19	2	9	Belgium	Elodie Vanhamme (1:03.90); Elise Matthysen (1:09.14); Kimberly Buys (59.85); Jolien Sysmans (56.29)	4:09.18	
20	2	1	Israel	Anna Volchkov (1:02.75); Yuliya Banach (1:09.72); Amit Ivry (58.33); Kristina Tchernychev (58.69)	4:09.49	NR
21	4	1	Belarus	Aleksandra Kovaleva (1:03.47); Inna Kapishina (1:08.11); Iryna Niafedava (1:01.51); Yulia Khitraya (56.63)	4:09.72	
22	4	8	Lithuania	Rugile Mileisyte (1:02.72) NR; Raminta Dvariskyte (1:09.97); Aiste Dobrovolskaite (1:02.05); Grite Apanaviciute (57.56)	4:12.30	NR
23	3	7	Singapore	Lim Shana Jia Yi (1:03.25); Roanne Ho (1:11.90); Lynette Lim (1:01.97); Quah Ting Wen (55.23)	4:12.35	NR
24	3	1	Ireland	Aisling Cooney (1:03.18); Fiona Doyle (1:10.53); Gráinne Murphy (1:02.41); Clare Dawson (56.55)	4:12.67	NR
25	2	8	Bahamas	Alana Dillette (1:03.40); Alicia Lightbourne (1:12.28); Arianna Vanderpool-Wallace (1:00.45); Teisha Lightbourne (59.46)	4:15.59	NR
26	3	8	Chinese Taipei	Chen Ting (1:04.63); Chen I-Chuan (1:14.08); Ting Sheng-Yo (1:03.59); Yang Chin-Kuei (56.58)	4:18.88	
27	1	1	Zimbabwe	Kirsten Lapham (1:07.06); Maxine Heard (1:13.30); Moira Fraser (1:06.25); Nicole Horn (57.74)	4:24.35	
28	4	0	Macau	Fong Man Wai (1:08.98); Lei On Kei (1:14.66); Ma Cheok Mei (1:06.50); Tan Chi Yan (1:01.53)	4:31.67	
29	1	5	Kenya	Rachita Shah (1:10.24); Achieng Ajulu-Bushell (1:11.94); Pina Ercolano (1:10.79); Sylvia Brunlehner (1:01.69)	4:34.66	NR
30	1	3	Malta	Nicol Cremona (1:08.65); Melinda Sue Micallef (1:19.84); Davina Mangion (1:06.08); Talisa Pace (1:00.35)	4:34.92	
31	2	0	Senegal	Khadidiatou Dieng (1:15.57); Ouleye Diallo (1:23.00); Binta Zahra Diop (1:02.31); Mareme Faye (1:05.32)	4:46.20	NR
32	1	6	Mozambique	Jessika Cossa (1:13.90); Monica Bernardo (1:19.47); Gessica Stagno (1:10.83); Faina Salate (1:04.42)	4:48.62	
33	3	0	India	Fariha Zaman (1:11.89); Murugaperumal Venpa (1:28.78); Pooja Raghava Alva (1:08.24); Chittaranjan Shubha (1:04.11)	4:53.02	
34	4	9	Albania	Reni Jani (1:21.63); Tea Pikuli (1:27.11); Sara Abdullahu (1:11.50); Rovena Marku (1:05.71)	5:05.95	
35	3	9	Pakistan	Rida Mitha (1:21.63); Aqsa Tariq (1:34.54); Sakina Ghulam (1:23.81); Mahnoor Maqsood (1:13.05)	5:33.03	
–	2	7	Venezuela		DNS	
–	4	2	Italy	Elena Gemo (1:01.00); Chiara Boggiatto (1:07.08); Ilaria Bianchi (58.77); Laura Letrari	DSQ	

=== Final ===
Rank	Lane	Nation	Swimmers	Time	Note
1st place, gold medalist(s)	4	China	Zhao Jing (58.98) AS; Chen Huijia (1:04.12); Jiao Liuyang (56.28); Li Zhesi (52.81)	3:52.19	WR
2nd place, silver medalist(s)	1	Australia	Emily Seebohm (59.40); Sarah Katsoulis (1:04.65); Jessicah Schipper (56.19); Lisbeth Trickett (52.34)	3:52.58	OC
3rd place, bronze medalist(s)	3	Germany	Daniela Samulski (59.85); Sarah Poewe (1:06.81); Annika Mehlhorn (57.14); Britta Steffen (51.99)	3:55.79	ER
4	2	Great Britain	Gemma Spofforth (58.96); Lowri Tynan (1:07.80); Ellen Gandy (57.39); Fran Halsall (52.88)	3:57.03	NR
5	6	Netherlands	Femke Heemskerk (1:01.28) =NR; Lia Dekker (1:06.51); Inge Dekker (56.82); Ranomi Kromowidjojo (52.70)	3:57.31	NR
6	7	Canada	Julia Wilkinson (1:00.37) NR; Annamay Pierse (1:06.48); Audrey Lacroix(57.51); Victoria Poon (53.51)	3:57.87	NR
7	5	Japan	Shiho Sakai (59.30); Nanaka Tamura (1:07.24); Yuka Kato (57.32); Haruka Ueda (54.07)	3:57.93	
8	8	Brazil	Fabíola Molina (1:00.07) SA; Carolina Mussi (1:08.22); Gabriella Silva (56.65); Tatiana Lemos (53.89)	3:58.83	
