= Osaka Seikei Girls' High School =

Private girls high school in Osaka, Japan

Osaka Seikei Girls' High School (大阪成蹊女子高等学校, Ōsaka Seikei Joshi Kōtōgakkō) is a girls' senior high school in Higashiyodogawa-ku, Osaka.

== Notable alumni ==
- Yuko Nakanishi
