= Liu Zige =

Chinese swimmer (born 1989)

Personal information
- Full name: Liu Zige
- Nationality: Chinese
- Born: 31 March 1989 (age 37) Benxi, Liaoning, China
- Height: 1.81 m (5 ft 11 in)
- Weight: 67 kg (148 lb; 10.6 st)

Sport
- Sport: Swimming
- Strokes: Butterfly
Medal record
Olympic Games
Gold medal – first place	2008 Beijing	200 m butterfly
World Championships (LC)
Gold medal – first place	2013 Barcelona	200 m butterfly
Silver medal – second place	2009 Rome	200 m butterfly
Bronze medal – third place	2011 Shanghai	200 m butterfly
World Championships (SC)
Gold medal – first place	2010 Dubai	4×100 m medley
Silver medal – second place	2012 Istanbul	100 m butterfly

Liu Zige (simplified Chinese: 刘子歌; traditional Chinese: 劉子歌; pinyin: Liú Zǐgē, born 31 March 1989) is a Chinese competitive swimmer. She won the gold medal in the 200 m butterfly at the 2008 Olympics and the 2013 World Championships. She formerly held the long course and short course world records in the event.

== Career ==
=== 2005–2008 ===
Liu swam at the 2005 World Championships, where she placed twentieth in the 200 m butterfly with a time of 2:14.25.

At the 2008 Olympics in Beijing, Liu competed in the 200 m butterfly. She qualified fastest for the final with a new Asian record of 2:06.25. In the final, she went head-to-head with Australia's Jessicah Schipper, who was the world record holder and reigning world champion in the event. Liu, a relative unknown, went 2:04.18 to win the gold medal and break Schipper's world record of 2:05.40 from 2006.

After the conclusion of the swimming events in Beijing, it was revealed that Schipper's coach, Ken Wood, had sold his training program to Liu's coach. Liu had spent time training with Schipper and Wood prior to the Beijing Olympics.

=== 2009 ===
In July 2009, Liu competed at the World Championships in Rome, swimming the 200 m butterfly. Her world record was broken by the US' Mary DeScenza in the heats. In the final, Liu won the silver medal in 2:03.90, finishing behind Schipper. Schipper and Liu recorded the two fastest times in history.

In October 2009, Liu competed at the National Games of China in Jinan. She broke the Asian record in the 100 m butterfly, going 56.07 to miss Sarah Sjöström's world record by 0.01 seconds. Days later, Liu competed in the 200 m butterfly. She went 2:01.81 to reclaim the world record, surpassing Schipper's mark by 1.60 seconds. Liu held it until 2026.

In November 2009, Liu competed in the FINA World Cup. At the Stockholm leg, she went 2:02.50 in the short course 200 butterfly to break Yuko Nakanishi's world record of 2:03.12 from 2008. Four days later, at the Berlin leg, Liu lowered the mark to 2:00.78. It stood until 2014.

=== 2010–2016 ===
In September 2010, Liu announced that she would skip the Asian Games scheduled for November 2010, choosing to prioritise the 2011 World Championships in Shanghai. She had not competed since the 2009 FINA World Cup.

At the 2011 Chinese National Championships in Wuhan, Liu won the 200 m butterfly in 2:04.40, which was the fastest time in a textile suit. This qualified her for the World Championships.

Despite going into the World Championships with the fastest time of the year, Liu was relegated to the bronze medal, recording 2:05.90 to finish 0.35 seconds behind gold medalist Jiao Liuyang.

Liu qualified for the 2012 Olympics in London as defending champion in the 200 m butterfly. In London, she finished eighth in the event, and her Olympic record was broken by gold medalist Jiao.

At the 2013 World Championships in Barcelona, Liu won the gold medal in the 200 m butterfly with a time of 2:04.59.

At the 2015 Chinese National Championships, Liu finished seventh in the 200 m butterfly, thereby missing qualification for the World Championships in Kazan.

At the 2016 Chinese National Championships in Foshan, Liu finished 5th in the 200 m butterfly with a time 2:08.86 and did not qualify for the Olympic team.

== See also ==
- China at the 2008 Summer Olympics – Swimming

Records
Preceded by (Australia) Jessicah Schipper	Women's 200 metre Butterfly; World Record Holder (Long Course); 14 August 2008 – 29 July 2009	Succeeded by (United States) Mary Descenza
Preceded by (Australia) Jessicah Schipper	Women's 200 metre Butterfly; World Record Holder (Long Course); 21 October 2009 – 5 July 2026	Succeeded by (Canada) Summer McIntosh
Preceded by (Japan) Yuko Nakanishi	Women's 200 metre Butterfly; World Record Holder (Short Course); 11 November 2009 – 3 December 2014	Succeeded by (Spain) Mireia Belmonte
