= Ken Wood (coach) =

Australian swimmer and coach (1929–2018)

Ken Wood (8 October 1929 – 16 June 2018) was an Australian swimmer and swimming coach and a three-time Olympic medal winner. He was the head coach at the Redcliffe Leagues Swimming Club at Redcliffe, Queensland, on the northern edge of Brisbane.

== Biography ==
Before moving into swimming coaching, he was a used car salesman and a Sydney cab driver. Wood's sporting career included playing for Footscray in the VFL, first grade cricketer for North Sydney and Cairns and was also a patrol captain and champion surf boat rower and lifesaver with Warriewood SLSC on Sydney's Northern Beaches.

Wood's replaced Laurie Lawrence in Townsville in the early 1970s and notable swimmers coached included Lesleigh Harvey and Michelle Pearson. His first major coaching appointment was on the 1982 Commonwealth Games swim team. Wood coached at the Australian Institute of Sport (AIS) from 1983 to 1985. He left the AIS to coach at the De Las Salle College at Scarborough, Brisbane. In 2001, he moved to the Redcliffe Memorial Pool.

During his coaching career, his swimmers won 85 National Championships and 152 Age Group National Championships, won a total of 61 international gold medals, broke 15 World Records, and 110 Australian Records.

Wood served on seven Olympic campaigns: 1988 in Seoul, 1992 in Barcelona, 1996 in Atlanta, 2000 in Sydney and 2004 in Athens, 2008 in Beijing and finally 2012 in London. He also coached swimmers on Commonwealth Games teams: 1974 in Christchurch, 1982 in Brisbane, 1986 in Edinburgh, 1990 in Auckland, 1994 in Victoria, 1998 in Kuala Lumpur, 2002 in Manchester and 2006 in Melbourne.

Wood trained Chinese swimming champions Liu Zige, Ye Shiwen and other Chinese National Team and Provincial team swimmers at his high performance centre. Liu won gold at the 2008 Beijing Olympics as well as 3 world medals in the 200m butterfly. Ye won the 200m and 400m medley at the 2012 London Olympics.

After Australia failed to win any individual gold medals in swimming at the 2012 London Olympics, Wood criticised the current swimmers, saying that they were "fat" compared to the Chinese swimmers, and criticised their "embarrassing" fixation on social media and treating the games like a "social gathering".

After the 2008 Summer Olympics, one of his students, Jessicah Schipper, left him after he sold training programs to Chinese swimmer Liu Zige, who later defeated Schipper in the 200m Butterfly and broke Schipper's world record at the 2008 Beijing Olympics.

== Death ==
Wood retired from coaching at the age of 87 in March 2018 and died on 16 June 2018 at the age of 88.

== Notable students ==
- Leisel Jones – coached from childhood through both the 2000 Summer Olympics in Sydney and the 2004 Summer Olympics in Athens
- Geoff Huegill – coached from age 12 through both the 2000 Summer Olympics in Sydney and the 2004 Summer Olympics in Athens
- Jessicah Schipper – coached from childhood through both the 2004 Summer Olympics in Athens and the 2008 Summer Olympics in Beijing
- Melissa Gorman – coached from early teens through both the 2008 Summer Olympics in Beijing and 2012 Summer Olympics in London
- Kylie Palmer
- Kate Brookes-Peterson
- Liu Zige
- Ye Shiwen
