= Rachel Komisarz =

American swimmer (born 1976)

Personal information
- Full name: Rachel Komisarz
- National team: United States
- Born: December 5, 1976 (age 49) Warren, Michigan, United States
- Height: 1.72 m (5 ft 8 in)
- Weight: 70 kg (150 lb)

Sport
- Sport: Swimming
- Strokes: Freestyle, butterfly
- Club: Lakeside Seahawks
- College team: University of Kentucky 1999
Medal record
Women's swimming
Representing the United States
Olympic Games
Gold medal – first place	2004 Athens	4×200 m freestyle relay
Silver medal – second place	2004 Athens	4×100 m medley relay
World Championships (LC)
Gold medal – first place	2003 Barcelona	4×200 m freestyle
Gold medal – first place	2005 Montreal	4×200 m freestyle
Silver medal – second place	2005 Montreal	4×100 m medley
Silver medal – second place	2007 Melbourne	4×100 m medley
World Championships (SC)
Gold medal – first place	2004 Indianapolis	4×200 m freestyle
Gold medal – first place	2008 Manchester	4x100 m medley
Silver medal – second place	2002 Moscow	4×200 m freestyle
Silver medal – second place	2004 Indianapolis	100 m butterfly
Silver medal – second place	2006 Shanghai	100 m butterfly
Silver medal – second place	2006 Shanghai	4×100 m medley
Silver medal – second place	2008 Manchester	100 m butterfly
Bronze medal – third place	2002 Moscow	400 m freestyle
Bronze medal – third place	2006 Shanghai	4×100 m freestyle
Pan Pacific Championships
Silver medal – second place	2006 Victoria	100 m butterfly

Rachel Komisarz (born December 5, 1976), also known by her married name Rachel Komisarz-Baugh, is an American former competition swimmer, Olympic gold medalist, world record-holder and collegiate swimming coach.

Born December 5, 1976 in Warren, Michigan, Komisarz began swimming as a senior at Warren Mott High School as a result of a gymnastics injury that left her with two fractured vertebrae.

She swam at the University of Kentucky, becoming a seven-time All American and three-time Southeastern Conference Champion by the end of her four years at the university. More than a dedicated swim athlete during her college years, she graduated with a Bachelor of Arts in Education at the University of Kentucky in 1999 and was a Kinesiology major with an emphasis in exercise. A standout swimmer during her college years, Rachel won Southeastern Conference titles in the 200-meter butterfly, and the 500 and 1650-meter freestyle. She was a three-time SEC Swimmer of the Year, and a recipient of the Southeastern Conference Commissioner's Trophy.

== 2004 Olympic medals ==
At the 2004 U.S. Olympic trials, she won the 200-meter butterfly event.

She swam for the United States team at the 2004 Summer Olympics, where she won a gold medal in the women's 4×200-meter freestyle relay, and a silver medal in the women's 4×100-meter medley relay, after swimming in the preliminary session of the meet. Though Komisarz did not swim, the silver medal American relay team in the 4x100-meter medley relay led through the first half of the final heat, but finished with a time of 3:59.12, second to Australia, who won the event for the first time.

With her career extending into her early 30's, in 2008 Komisarz set American records in the 50 and 100-meter butterfly, and helped set relay records in both the 400 and 800-meter freestyle and 400-meter individual medley. Komisarz won 23 medals representing the United States in World Championships between 2003-2008.

She did not make the 2008 Olympic team, and had shoulder surgery shortly afterwards. Komisarz tried to continue her swimming career, but was overly hampered by the injury, and retired from training for competition in 2009.

== Coaching ==
Komisarz was named an assistant swim coach at the University of Louisville in 2009, where she helped lead the men's and women's team to 5 conference championships. She was also the women's recruiting coordinator and helped field world class athletes, ranking the recruiting classes 12th and 7th in the NCAA for the 2010 and 2011 respectively. While she was an assistant at the University of Louisville, she led the women's team to place 15th, and the men's team to place 10th at the NCAA Championships. During her tenure at the University of Louisville, she also earned a master's degree in Sports Administration.

Komisarz was named the head coach of the Ohio Bobcats women's swimming team at Ohio University in 2014, after serving five years as an assistant coach for the Louisville Cardinals swimming team. Since taking the job at Ohio University, Komisarz's teams have finished 6th twice at the conference championships. The Bobcats improved one spot to 5th in the 2017 conference championships. Komisarz currently has a meet record of 18–15, and has helped 3 swimmers qualify for the Olympic Trials. Komisarz strongly advocated the benefits of personalization in training her swimmers. In describing her coaching focus, she has said, “My philosophy is to give the athlete what they need personally. My workouts are structures for the individual and how I can best help them reach their full potential.”

As of 2021, she was serving as an Associate Director for Planning and Development at Aspirant in Nashville, Tennessee.

== Honors ==
In October, 2009, she was inducted into the University of Kentucky Hall of Fame for her swimming achievements. On June 21, 2018, Komisarz and Conrad Dobler were enshrined into the National Polish-American Sports Hall of Fame in Troy, Michigan.

== See also ==
- List of Olympic medalists in swimming (women)
- List of World Aquatics Championships medalists in swimming (women)
- World record progression 4 × 100 metres medley relay
