= Jessicah Schipper =

Australian swimmer

Personal information
- Full name: Jessicah Lee Schipper
- National team: Australia
- Born: 19 November 1986 (age 39) Brisbane, Queensland
- Height: 1.70 m (5 ft 7 in)
- Weight: 60 kg (132 lb)

Sport
- Sport: Swimming
- Strokes: Butterfly
- Club: Commercial
Medal record
Event	1st	2nd	3rd
Olympic Games	2	0	2
World Championships (LC)	5	4	1
World Championships (SC)	4	0	1
Pan Pacific Championships	3	0	1
Commonwealth Games	5	1	0
Total	19	5	5
Women's swimming
Representing Australia
Olympic Games
Gold medal – first place	2004 Athens	4×100 m medley
Gold medal – first place	2008 Beijing	4×100 m medley
Bronze medal – third place	2008 Beijing	100 m butterfly
Bronze medal – third place	2008 Beijing	200 m butterfly
World Championships (LC)
Gold medal – first place	2005 Montreal	100 m butterfly
Gold medal – first place	2005 Montreal	4×100 m medley
Gold medal – first place	2007 Melbourne	200 m butterfly
Gold medal – first place	2007 Melbourne	4×100 m medley
Gold medal – first place	2009 Rome	200 m butterfly
Silver medal – second place	2005 Montreal	200 m butterfly
Silver medal – second place	2007 Melbourne	100 m butterfly
Silver medal – second place	2009 Rome	100 m butterfly
Silver medal – second place	2009 Rome	4×100 m medley
Bronze medal – third place	2003 Barcelona	4×100 m medley
World Championships (SC)
Gold medal – first place	2004 Indianapolis	4×100 m medley
Gold medal – first place	2006 Shanghai	200 m butterfly
Gold medal – first place	2006 Shanghai	4×200 m freestyle
Gold medal – first place	2006 Shanghai	4×100 m medley
Bronze medal – third place	2006 Shanghai	100 m butterfly
Pan Pacific Championships
Gold medal – first place	2006 Victoria	100 m butterfly
Gold medal – first place	2006 Victoria	200 m butterfly
Gold medal – first place	2010 Irvine	200 m butterfly
Bronze medal – third place	2006 Victoria	4×100 m medley
Commonwealth Games
Gold medal – first place	2006 Melbourne	100 m butterfly
Gold medal – first place	2006 Melbourne	200 m butterfly
Gold medal – first place	2006 Melbourne	4×100 m medley
Gold medal – first place	2010 Delhi	200 m butterfly
Gold medal – first place	2010 Delhi	4×100 m medley
Silver medal – second place	2006 Melbourne	50 m butterfly

Jessicah Lee Schipper OAM (born 19 November 1986) is an Australian former competition swimmer and former world record holder for 200 metres butterfly. Specialising in the 100 and 200 metres butterfly, she won several gold medals at the Olympic Games and the World Championships between 2004 and 2009.

== Early life ==
In 2003, Schipper finished high school at Pine Rivers State High School.

== Swimming career ==
Schipper made her Australian team debut at the 2003 World Championships in Barcelona. She finished ninth in the 100 m butterfly and tenth in the 200 m butterfly. She won a bronze medal in the 4×100 m medley relay.

Schipper qualified for the 2004 Olympics in Athens. She came fourth in the 100 m butterfly with a time of 58.22; the gold medal was won by compatriot Petria Thomas. Schipper swam in the heats of the 4×100 m medley relay and was replaced by Thomas in the final, with the team going on to win the gold medal.

Schipper competed at the 2005 World Championships in Montreal. She won the gold medal in the 100 m butterfly with a championship and Australian record time of 57.23. In the 200 m butterfly, Schipper won the silver medal in a time of 2:05.65, 0.04 seconds behind Otylia Jędrzejczak of Poland. Both swimmers surpassed Jędrzejczak's world record of 2:05.78 from 2002. Video footage showed Jędrzejczak finishing with a non-simultaneous touch, but she was not disqualified since video replay was not accepted as evidence at the time. Schipper's final event was the 4×100 m medley relay, where Australia won the gold medal in a championship record time of 3:57.47.

In February 2006, at the Australian Championships in Melbourne, Schipper set a new Australian record of 57.15 in the 100 m butterfly.

In March 2006, Schipper competed at the Commonwealth Games in Melbourne. She won the gold medal in the 100 and 200 m butterfly events, setting games records of 57.48 and 2:06.09, respectively. She swam in the 4×100 m medley relay, with Australia winning the gold medal in a world record time of 3:56.30.

In August 2006, Schipper competed at the Pan Pacific Championships in Victoria, British Columbia. She won the gold medal in the 200 m butterfly with a world record time of 2:05.40. She then won the 100 m butterfly, setting a new championship record of 57.30. She won bronze in the 4×100 m medley relay with a time of 4:03.82.

Schipper competed at the 2007 World Championships in Melbourne. She won the silver medal in the 100 m butterfly with a time of 57.24. She then won the gold medal in the 200 m butterfly with a time of 2:06.39. She won another gold medal in the 4×100 m medley relay, contributing to a new world record of 3:55.74.

At the 2008 Olympics in Beijing, Schipper won the bronze medal in the 100 m butterfly with a time of 57.25. Her next event was the 200 m butterfly, where she was favourite to win due to her status as world record holder and reigning world champion in the event. Schipper was beaten by Liu Zige and Jiao Liuyang, both of China, and who both surpassed Schipper's world record. Schipper recorded 2:06.26 to win the bronze medal. Schipper concluded her campaign with the 4×100 m medley relay, splitting 56.25 on the butterfly leg. Australia won the gold medal in a world record time of 3:52.69. After the conclusion of the swimming events in Beijing, it was revealed that Schipper's coach, Ken Wood, had sold his training program to Liu's coach. Liu had spent time training with Schipper and Wood prior to the Beijing Olympics. Consequently, Schipper left Wood's program and started working with Stephan Widmar.

At the 2009 World Championships in Rome, Schipper went 56.23 in the 100 m butterfly to win the silver medal behind Sarah Sjöström of Sweden. Both swimmers surpassed the world record of 56.44. Schipper's next event was the 200 m butterfly. In the semifinals, she went 2:04.87 to set a new Australian record and qualify third-fastest for the final. In the final, she won the gold medal and went 2:03.41 to reclaim the world record. She later swam in the 4×100 m medley relay. Australia won the silver medal, losing their world record to China. Australia recorded 3:52.58 to also surpass the former world record.

Schipper competed at the 2010 Pan Pacific Championships in Irvine. She won the gold medal in the 200 m butterfly with a time of 2:06.90. She then recorded 58.26 to finish ninth in the 100 m butterfly.

At the Commonwealth Games in Delhi, Schipper went 2:07.04 to win the gold medal in the 200 m butterfly. Later in the night, she competed in the 4×100 m medley relay, swimming the butterfly leg and contributing to the gold medal in an overall time of 3:56.99.

At the 2011 World Championships in Shanghai, Schipper went 57.95 to finish seventh in the 100 m butterfly. She then finished equal-seventh in the 200 m butterfly with a time of 2:06.64.

Schipper's final competition was the 2012 Olympics in London. She finished twenty-fourth in the 100 m butterfly and thirteenth in the 200 m butterfly.

In September 2014, Schipper retired from swimming at the age of 27.

== Awards and honours ==
- Order of Australia Medal (2005)
- Swimming Australia Swimmer of the Year (2009)
- Swimming World – Female Pacific Rim Swimmer of the Year (2009)

== See also ==
- List of Australian records in swimming
- List of Commonwealth Games records in swimming
- List of Olympic medalists in swimming (women)
- List of World Aquatics Championships medalists in swimming (women)
- List of Commonwealth Games medallists in swimming (women)
- World record progression 100 metres butterfly
- World record progression 200 metres butterfly

Records
Preceded by Otylia Jędrzejczak	Women's 200 metre butterfly world record holder (long course); 17 August 2006 – 14 August 2008	Succeeded by Liu Zige
Preceded by Mary DeScenza	Women's 200 metre butterfly world record holder (long course); 30 July 2009 – 21 October 2009	Succeeded by Liu Zige
