= Felicity Galvez =

Australian swimmer (born 1985)

Personal information
- Full name: Felicity Madeline Galvez
- National team: Australia
- Born: 4 March 1985 (age 41) Melbourne, Victoria
- Height: 1.67 m (5 ft 6 in)
- Weight: 58 kg (128 lb)

Sport
- Sport: Swimming
- Strokes: Freestyle, butterfly
- Club: SOPAC
Medal record
Women's swimming
Representing Australia
Olympic Games
Gold medal – first place	2008 Beijing	4×100 m medley
Gold medal – first place	2008 Beijing	4×200 m freestyle
World Championships (LC)
Gold medal – first place	2005 Montreal	4×100m medley
Gold medal – first place	2007 Melbourne	4×100 m medley
Bronze medal – third place	2009 Rome	4×100 m freestyle
World Championships (SC)
Gold medal – first place	2004 Indianapolis	4×100 m medley
Gold medal – first place	2008 Manchester	50 m butterfly
Gold medal – first place	2008 Manchester	100 m butterfly
Gold medal – first place	2010 Dubai	100 m butterfly
Silver medal – second place	2008 Manchester	200 m butterfly
Silver medal – second place	2008 Manchester	4×100 m medley
Silver medal – second place	2010 Dubai	50 m butterfly
Bronze medal – third place	2010 Dubai	4×100 m medley
Pan Pacific Championships
Silver medal – second place	2010 Irvine	4×100 m freestyle
Commonwealth Games
Gold medal – first place	2010 Delhi	4×100 m freestyle
Silver medal – second place	2006 Melbourne	200 m butterfly

Felicity Madeline Galvez, OAM (born 4 March 1985) is an Australian swimmer and two-time Olympic gold medalist. She was an Australian Institute of Sport scholarship holder. She was educated at Runnymede College in Madrid.

== Career ==
She broke both the short course 50-metre and 100-metre butterfly world records in 2008, in 25.32 and 55.89, respectively. The 100-metre record lasted for less than a month, as teammate Libby Trickett lowered it on 26 April 2008. The 50-metre record was broken by Therese Alshammar during the Stockholm stop of the 2008 FINA World Cup Series, but Marieke Guehrer returned it to Australian hands just days later. Galvez broke the 100m butterfly short course world record again at the 2009 FINA World Cup Series in Stockholm with a 55.46. That is 0.22 seconds faster than the previous mark of 55.68 set by Australian teammate, Jessicah Schipper on 12 August 2009.

== Career best times ==
Event	Time	Record	Season
Long Course
50m butterfly	26.24		2009
100m butterfly	57.60		2008
200m butterfly	2:07.66		2008
100 m freestyle	54.50		2009
200m freestyle	1:58.00		2008

Event	Time	Record	Season
Short Course
50 m butterfly	24.90	Former WR Holder	2010
100 m butterfly	55.43	Former WR Holder	2010
200 m butterfly	2:03.31		2009
100 m freestyle	52.76		2009
200 m freestyle	1:54.88		2009

== See also ==
- List of Olympic medalists in swimming (women)
- List of World Aquatics Championships medalists in swimming (women)
- List of Commonwealth Games medallists in swimming (women)
- World record progression 50 metres butterfly
- World record progression 100 metres butterfly

Records
Preceded by Libby Lenton	Women's 100-metre butterfly world record-holder (short course); 13 April 2008 – 26 April 2008	Succeeded by Libby Trickett
Preceded by Jessicah Schipper	Women's 100-metre butterfly world record-holder (short course); 11 November 2009 – 12 December 2009	Succeeded by Diane Bui Duyet
Preceded by Anna-Karin Kammerling	Women's 50-metre butterfly world record-holder (short course); 11 April 2008 – 12 November 2008	Succeeded by Therese Alshammar
