= Beatrix Boulsevicz =

Hungarian swimmer (born 1987)

Personal information
- Nationality: Hungary
- Born: February 15, 1987 (age 39) Budapest, Hungary
- Height: 1.69 m (5 ft 7 in)
- Weight: 63 kg (139 lb)

Sport
- Sport: Swimming
- Strokes: Butterfly
- Club: Rómani Sportegyesület/A Jövő SC
Medal record
European Championships (SC)
Gold medal – first place	2005 Triest	200 m Butterfly
Silver medal – second place	2006 Helsinki	200 m Butterfly

Beatrix Boulsevicz (born February 15, 1987, in Budapest) is a butterfly swimmer from Hungary, who won the gold medal in the 200 m butterfly at the European SC Championships 2005. She is trained by Attila Selmeczi.

Boulsevicz competed at the 2004 and 2008 Summer Olympics.
