= Otylia Jędrzejczak =

Polish swimmer (born 1983)

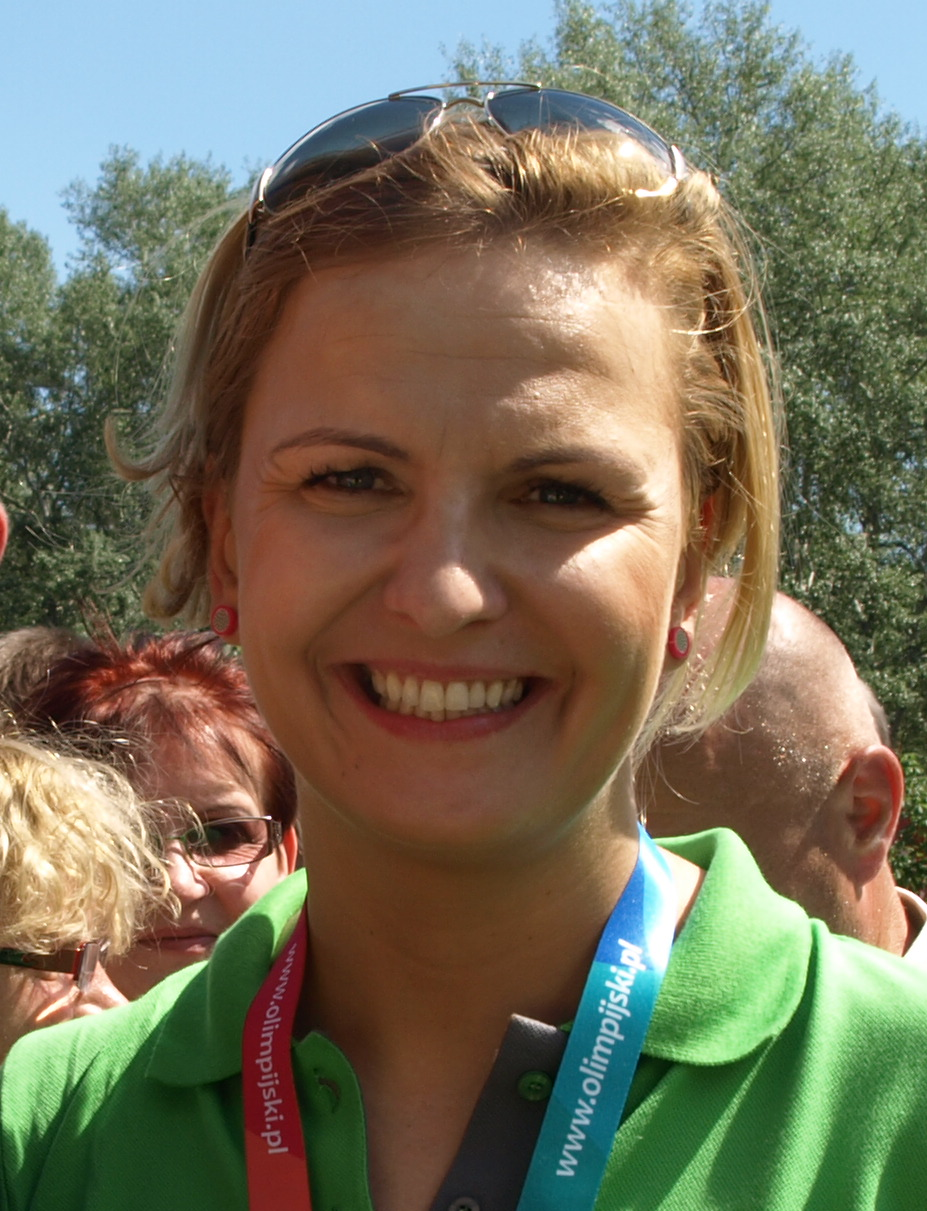

Personal information
- Full name: Otylia Jędrzejczak
- Nationality: Poland
- Born: 13 December 1983 (age 42) Ruda Śląska, Śląskie
- Height: 1.90 m (6 ft 3 in)
- Weight: 73 kg (161 lb)

Sport
- Sport: Swimming
- Strokes: Freestyle and butterfly
- Club: AZS-AWF Warszawa
Medal record
Event	1st	2nd	3rd
Olympic Games	1	2	0
World Championships (LC)	2	3	2
World Championships (SC)	0	0	1
European Championships (LC)	5	3	2
European Championships (SC)	3	1	1
Total	11	9	6
Women's swimming
Representing Poland
Olympic Games
Gold medal – first place	2004 Athens	200 m butterfly
Silver medal – second place	2004 Athens	400 m freestyle
Silver medal – second place	2004 Athens	100 m butterfly
World Championships (LC)
Gold medal – first place	2003 Barcelona	200 m butterfly
Gold medal – first place	2005 Montreal	200 m butterfly
Silver medal – second place	2001 Fukuoka	100 m butterfly
Silver medal – second place	2003 Barcelona	100 m butterfly
Silver medal – second place	2007 Melbourne	400 m freestyle
Bronze medal – third place	2005 Montreal	100 m butterfly
Bronze medal – third place	2007 Melbourne	200 m butterfly
World Championships (SC)
Bronze medal – third place	2000 Athens	200 m butterfly
European Championships (LC)
Gold medal – first place	2000 Helsinki	200 m butterfly
Gold medal – first place	2002 Berlin	200 m butterfly
Gold medal – first place	2004 Madrid	200 m butterfly
Gold medal – first place	2006 Budapest	200 m freestyle
Gold medal – first place	2006 Budapest	200 m butterfly
Silver medal – second place	2000 Helsinki	100 m butterfly
Silver medal – second place	2002 Berlin	100 m butterfly
Silver medal – second place	2006 Budapest	4×200 m freestyle
Bronze medal – third place	1999 Istanbul	200 m butterfly
Bronze medal – third place	2004 Madrid	100 m butterfly
European Championships (SC)
Gold medal – first place	2001 Antwerp	200 m butterfly
Gold medal – first place	2006 Helsinki	200 m butterfly
Gold medal – first place	2007 Debrecen	200 m butterfly
Silver medal – second place	2006 Helsinki	200 m freestyle
Bronze medal – third place	2007 Debrecen	100 m butterfly
Universiade
Gold medal – first place	2005 Izmir	100 m butterfly
Gold medal – first place	2005 Izmir	200 m butterfly
Gold medal – first place	2005 Izmir	200 m freestyle

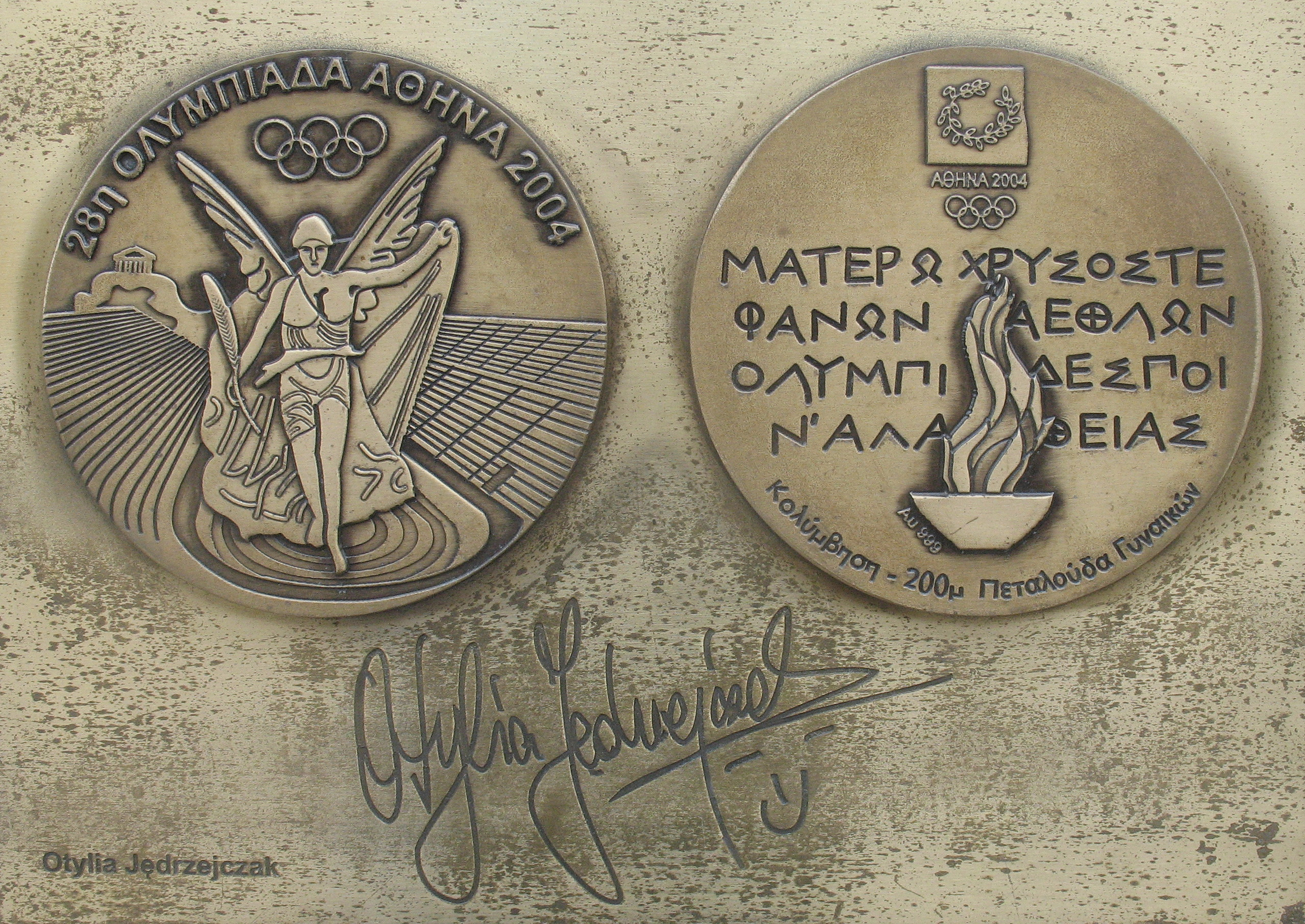
Copy of medal and autograph of Otylia Jędrzejczak in Stars Avenue in Dziwnów.

Otylia Jędrzejczak (Polish: [ɔˈtɨlja jɛndˈʐɛjtʂak]; born 13 December 1983) is a Polish swimmer. She was the Olympic champion from 2004 Athens in the 200 metre butterfly. She finished 4th in this event in the 2008 Summer Olympics in Beijing, and also swam at the 2000 Summer Olympics in Sydney. In Athens 2004 she also won silver in 400 m freestyle and 100 m butterfly. Three times she broke the world record in the women's 200 m butterfly (once in the 25-metre pool).

Jędrzejczak was born in Ruda Śląska, Silesian Voivodship, Poland. She started swimming at the age of six as a measure to correct a slight curvature of the spine. At first she hated the sport. Her attitude towards it changed after she had won her first prize in a competition in Germany at the age of eight. Jędrzejczak took up swimming seriously in high school. Led by coach Maria Jakóbik, she won her first titles in the Junior European Championships in 1999. Medals in the Senior European Championships in 1999 and 2000 opened the way to her first Olympic appearance.

Jędrzejczak studied at the Academy of Physical Education in Warsaw. Her coach is Paweł Słomiński. She is 190 cm (6 ft 3 in) tall.

For her sporting achievements, she received the Knight's Cross of the Order of Polonia Restituta (5th Class) in 2004.

== Career ==
In 1999 she won the 100 m and 200 m butterfly titles during the Junior European Championships in Moscow and a bronze medal in the 200 m butterfly event in the Senior European Championships in Istanbul.

In 2000, she won gold in the 200 m butterfly and silver in the 100 m butterfly in the European Championships in Helsinki.

In the 2000 Summer Olympics she placed 5th in the 200 m butterfly.

In 2001, she placed second in the 100 m butterfly event in the World Championships in Fukuoka.

On 4 August 2002 she established a new world record in the 200 m butterfly with a time of 2:05.78 during the European Championships in Berlin. Except the 200 m title, she won a silver medal in the 100 m butterfly event.

During the 2003 World Championships in Barcelona she placed first in the 200 m butterfly and second in the 100 m butterfly.

In the 2004 European Championships in Madrid she defended her 200 m butterfly title and placed third in the 100 m butterfly event.

During the 2004 Summer Olympics she won three medals: silver in the 400 m freestyle and 100 m butterfly, and gold in the 200 m butterfly. The latter one was Poland's first ever Olympic gold medal in swimming. This equals her in the number of medals earned during single Olympic games with the legendary Polish athlete Irena Szewińska.

After winning bronze in the 100 m butterfly during the 2005 World Championships in Montreal, Jędrzejczak managed to defend her title in the 200 m butterfly event on 29 July 2005. In the final she improved her own world record with a time of 2:05.61 to beat Australian Jessicah Schipper by only 0.04 seconds. After the race it was disputed that Jędrzejczak touched the finishing wall with only one hand (with video replays confirming this), which according to International Swimming Federation rules would be grounds for an automatic disqualification. But since this was not noticed by the judges and no complaints were filed within 30 minutes of the race, her result has been approved.

In the summer of 2005 she won three gold medals at the Summer Universiade in İzmir.

In the 2006 European Championships in Budapest she again defended her 200 m butterfly title and won 200 m freestyle. With her teammates, she took the silver medal in 4×200 m freestyle relay.

On 13 December 2007, on her 24th birthday, Jędrzejczak broke the world record for the 200 metre women's butterfly (short course) with a time of 2:03.53.

== Olympic Games gold medal auction ==
Jędrzejczak owes her Olympic gold medal success to a brilliant finish in the last quarter of the 200 metre distance, which allowed her to overtake Australian Petria Thomas, who led the race for over 150 metres.

After the race Jędrzejczak revealed, that during the pre-Olympic trials in Athens in June she had declared that if she won a gold medal in the Olympics, she would auction it off and hand the proceeds to a charity helping children suffering from leukemia.

The results of the internet auction were announced on 19 December 2004 with Victoria Cymes, a Polish food company, turning out to be the highest bidder with 257,550 zlotys (about 82,437 USD). The money was handed over to the Oncology and Haematology Clinic of Wrocław's Children's Hospital.

== Accident and trial ==
On 1 October 2005, she was injured in a car accident, which killed her 19-year-old brother, Szymon. The 2005 Chrysler 300C HEMI which she was driving crashed head-on into a tree, after a botched attempt to overtake several long-haul trucks at excessive speed during bad weather conditions.

She was tried for an accident resulting in passenger's death. The prosecutors initially proposed Jędrzejczak an agreement which would lead to a sentence of 2 years imprisonment in suspension. Jędrzejczak refused the agreement and strongly pressed for an acquittal, stating that she was already punished enough by her brother's death. Her trial began in February 2007 before the District Court in Płońsk, close to the place of the accident. She was convicted and sentenced to 9 months of probation during which she had to do 30 hours of community service a month. She also lost her driving licence for 1 year. Both the prosecution and Jędrzejczak appealed to the Regional Court in Płock, which upheld the ruling.

During the trial the prosecution highlighted the fact that Jędrzejczak was an inexperienced driver and her driving at the moment of the fatal accident was reckless. The defence suggested discrepancies in the accident witness testimonies and criticized the opinions of experts assessing the causes of the accident.

In relation to whoever was responsible for the accident council Tadeusz Wolfowicz declared that his client (Jędrzejczak) does not feel guilty of causing the accident, while her other attorney Jakub Wende claimed that "The mere fact that an accident took place cannot be regarded as that my client was at fault".

The accident, the trial and their aftermath started taking their toll. Her attitude during the trial resulted in alienation of many of her fans and decline of her popularity.

== Later career ==
In 2006, she returned to competitive swimming and competed in European Championships in Budapest, finishing first in 200 m freestyle and 200 m butterfly as well as second in 4×200 m relay. In 2007, she managed to set a new world record in 200m butterfly (short course) in Debrecen, but earlier in the year in Melbourne, in the World Championships, she finished third in her main competition, 200 m butterfly, and in Eindhoven in 2008, she failed to qualify for the final race in both 100 m and 200 m butterfly.

Although both Jędrzejczak and her trainer Paweł Słomiński stated that Eindhoven results were "just an accident", 2008 Summer Olympics proved otherwise. Jędrzejczak, who won three Olympic medals four years earlier, in Beijing managed only to reach 9th place in 200 m freestyle and a disastrous 17th place in 100 m butterfly. She hoped for a medal in her favourite 200 m butterfly, but she failed, finishing 4th.

After returning from Beijing, Jędrzejczak stated in an interview that she probably would quit her career as a professional swimmer.

However, Jędrzejczak qualified for the 2012 Summer Olympics in the 100m and 200m butterfly. She swam a time of 59.31 in her 100m heat, but did not qualify for the semifinals.

== World championship results ==
- 2001 World Aquatics Championships: silver medal in the 100 m butterfly
- 2003 World Aquatics Championships: silver medal in the 100 m butterfly
- 2003 World Aquatics Championships: gold medal in the 200 m butterfly
- 2005 World Aquatics Championships: bronze medal in the 100 m butterfly
- 2005 World Aquatics Championships: gold medal in the 200 m butterfly
- 2007 World Aquatics Championships: silver medal in the 400 m freestyle
- 2007 World Aquatics Championships: bronze medal in the 200 m butterfly

Records
Preceded by (Australia) Susie O'Neill	Women's 200 metre butterfly world record holder (long course); 4 August 2002 – 17 August 2006	Succeeded by (Australia) Jessicah Schipper
Preceded by (China) Yang Yu	Women's 200 metre butterfly world record holder (short course); 13 December 2007 – 23 February 2008	Succeeded by (Japan) Yuko Nakanishi
Awards
Preceded by (Ukraine) Yana Klochkova	European Swimmer of the Year; 2005	Succeeded by (France) Laure Manaudou
