= Terri Dunning =

British swimmer (born 1985)

Personal information
- Full name: Terri Dunning
- Nationality: British
- Born: 11 March 1985 (age 41) Stafford, United Kingdom

Sport
- Sport: Swimming
- Strokes: Butterfly
- Club: City of Birmingham
- College team: University of Wolverhampton
Medal record
Women's swimming
Representing Great Britain
European Championships (LC)
Gold medal – first place	2006 Budapest	4×100 m medley
Universiade
Bronze medal – third place	2005 Izmir	200 m butterfly
Representing England
Commonwealth Games
Silver medal – second place	2006 Melbourne	4×100 m medley
Bronze medal – third place	2006 Melbourne	200 m butterfly

Terri Dunning (born 11 March 1985) is a former British swimmer. She specialised in butterfly and won medals at the 2005 Summer Universiade (World University Games), 2006 European Aquatics Championships and 2006 Commonwealth Games. Terri set a new British Record three times in her career breaking the 100 Butterfly (long course) at the 2006 Commonwealth Games, the 100 Butterfly (short course) at the 2005 European Short Course Championships in Trieste and the 200 Butterfly (short course) when she missed a medal by just 0.01sec at the 2007 European Short Course Championships in Debrecen.

== See also ==
- List of Commonwealth Games medallists in swimming (women)
