= Aurore Mongel =

French swimmer

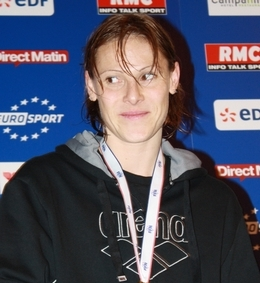

Personal information
- Nationality: France
- Born: 19 April 1982 (age 44) Épinal, France
- Height: 1.77 m (5 ft 10 in)
- Weight: 68 kg (150 lb)

Sport
- Sport: Swimming
- Strokes: Butterfly
- Club: Mulhouse ON
Medal record
World Championships (LC)
Bronze medal – third place	2007 Melbourne	4×200 m freestyle
European Championships (LC)
Gold medal – first place	2004 Madrid	4×100 m freestyle
Gold medal – first place	2004 Madrid	4×100 m medley
Gold medal – first place	2008 Eindhoven	200 m butterfly
Silver medal – second place	2008 Eindhoven	100 m butterfly
Bronze medal – third place	2006 Budapest	4×100 m freestyle
Bronze medal – third place	2006 Budapest	4×200 m freestyle
European Championships (SC)
Gold medal – first place	2009 Istanbul	200 m butterfly
Silver medal – second place	2008 Rijeka	200 m butterfly
Bronze medal – third place	2005 Trieste	200 m butterfly
Mediterranean Games
Gold medal – first place	2005 Almeríal	4×100 m medley

Aurore Mongel (born 19 April 1982 in Épinal, France) is a national record holding and Olympic butterfly swimmer from France. She swam for France at the 2008 Olympics, where she set the French record in the 200 m butterfly (2:06.49).

She was the 2008 European Champion in the 200 m butterfly (long course).

On 29 July 2009, she bettered her French record in the 200 m butterfly to 2:05.09 in semifinals of the event at the 2009 World Championships.
