= Yuko Nakanishi =

Japanese swimmer (born 1981)

Personal information
- Born: April 24, 1981 (age 45)
Medal record
Women's swimming
Representing Japan
Olympic Games
Bronze medal – third place	2004 Athens	200 m butterfly
World Championships (LC)
Bronze medal – third place	2003 Barcelona	200 m butterfly
Bronze medal – third place	2005 Montreal	200 m butterfly
Pan Pacific Championships
Silver medal – second place	2006 Victoria	200 m butterfly
Silver medal – second place	2006 Victoria	4x100 m medley

Yuko Nakanishi (中西悠子, Nakanishi Yūko; born April 24, 1981 in Ikeda, Osaka, Japan) is a Japanese butterfly swimmer.

She attended Osaka Seikei Girls' High School.

== Major achievements ==
2000 Sydney Olympics

- 200m butterfly 7th (Heat 2:10.22, Semifinal 2:09.89, Final 2:09.66)

2004 Athens Olympics

- 100m butterfly 14th (Heat 1:00.16, Semifinal 59.53)
- 200m butterfly 3rd (Heat 2:10.04, Semifinal 2:08.83, Final 2:08.04)

2008 Beijing Olympics

- 100m butterfly 18th (Heat 58.61)
- 200m butterfly 5th (Heat 2:06.62, Semifinal 2:06.96, Final 2:07.32)

== Personal bests ==
In long course

- 100m butterfly: 58.52 (April 16, 2008)
- 200m butterfly: 2:06.38 Japanese Record (April 19, 2008)

Records
Preceded by Otylia Jędrzejczak	World Record Holder; Women's 200 Butterfly (25m); February 23, 2008 – November 11, 2009	Succeeded by Liu Zige
