= Mary Mohler =

American swimmer

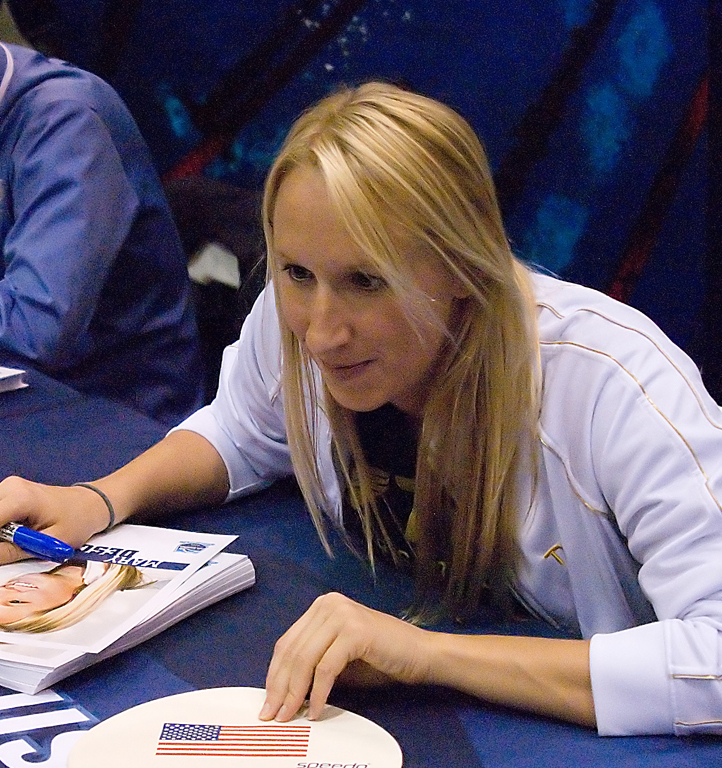
- Mohler in 2009

Personal information
- Full name: Mary Elizabeth Mohler
- National team: United States
- Born: Mary Elizabeth DeScenza; September 17, 1984 (age 41) Middlesex, New Jersey, U.S.
- Height: 5 ft 10 in (178 cm)

Sport
- Sport: Swimming
- Strokes: Butterfly, backstroke, freestyle
- Club: Athens Bulldog Swim Club
- College team: University of Georgia
- Coach: Jack Bauerle
Medal record
Women's swimming
Representing United States
World Championships (LC)
Gold medal – first place	2005 Montreal	4×200 m freestyle
Silver medal – second place	2001 Fukuoka	4×100 m medley
Silver medal – second place	2003 Barcelona	4×100 m medley
Silver medal – second place	2005 Montreal	4×100 m medley
Bronze medal – third place	2005 Montreal	4×100 m freestyle
World Championships (SC)
Gold medal – first place	2008 Manchester	200 m butterfly
Silver medal – second place	2006 Shanghai	4×100 m medley
Pan Pacific Championships
Silver medal – second place	2002 Yokohama	200 m butterfly
Bronze medal – third place	2006 Victoria	100 m butterfly

Mary Elizabeth Mohler (née DeScenza, born September 17, 1984) is an American former competition swimmer and former world record-holder in the Women's 200-meter butterfly (long course).

== Pre-college career ==
Mohler showed promise from an early age. Swimming for the Academy Bullets Swim Club, she set several team records, some lasting over a decade. In high school, Mohler was a two time state champion in the 200 yard freestyle, a four-time state champion in the 100 yard butterfly, and a two-time state champion in the 200 yard medley relay. She broke the 100 yard butterfly IHSA state record during the 2001 state finals with the time of 53.11.

Mohler swam the butterfly leg of the 4x100 medley relay in the 2001 World Aquatics Championships in Fukuoka, Japan, winning her first international medal, a silver. She had finished fourth in the individual final.

== Collegiate career ==
Mohler attended the University of Georgia, earning seven All-American certificates. She was a four-time NCAA champion in the 200 yard butterfly from 2003 to 2006 - only the second time a swimmer had done so, behind Mary T. Meagher.

In 2003, Mohler won another relay silver at the World Aquatics Championships, and followed it up with three more relay medals at the 2005 World Aquatics Championships, including her first gold medal in the 4x200 freestyle relay.

In 2005, she won an NCAA title with the UGA swimming and diving team. That year, she participated on four of the five winning relays and won two of her individual events, the 100 and 200 yard Butterfly. Her records set at UGA still stand for the 100 and 200 yard Butterfly with the times of 51.56 and 1:53.51, respectively. She won the 2005–06 Honda Sports Award for Swimming and Diving, recognizing her as the outstanding college female swimmer of the year.

In 2019, Mohler was inducted into the University of Georgia's Circle of Honor, the highest honor for UGA student-athletes.

NCAA swim titles
Year	Event	Time
2003	200 yard Butterfly	1:53.51
2004	200 meter Butterfly	2:06.02
2004	400 meter Freestyle Relay	3:35.14
2004	400 meter Medley Relay	3:56.00
2005	100 yard Butterfly	52.11
2005	200 yard Butterfly	1:54.19
2005	400 yard Freestyle Relay	3:13.56
2005	800 yard Freestyle Relay	7:01.03
2005	200 yard Medley Relay	1:37.81
2005	400 yard Medley Relay	3:33.89
2006	100 yard Butterfly	51.56
2006	200 yard Butterfly	1:53.78
2006	800 yard Freestyle Relay	7:03.75
2006	200 yard Medley Relay	1:37.24

=== 2004 Olympic Trials ===
In 2004, Mohler qualified for the U.S. Olympic Swim Trials, but did not make the team, coming in fourth in the 200m butterfly with a time of 2:10.89. This was an upset, as she was the reigning NCAA champion in the 200 butterfly, and had qualified for three US world championship teams before. She also finished 7th in the 100 meter butterfly.

== Professional career ==
A year before graduating from UGA, Mohler signed with major swimsuit brand TYR.

Mohler was motivated to make the 2008 Olympic Team after narrowly missing the team in 2004, citing her 4th place finish in the 200m fly as a "blessing in disguise" because she was able to focus more of her swimming and train harder by learning from her mistakes. In 2007, she came in second behind Michael Phelps in the 2007-08 USA Swimming Grand Prix Series.

=== 2008 Olympic Trials ===
However, in 2008, Mohler again was just short of a spot on the team. In the 200 meter butterfly, she finished fourth again, although improved her time to a 2:09.23. She also finished fourth in the 200 meter backstroke, sixth in the 100 meter butterfly, and 10th in the 100 meter backstroke.

However, at the 2008 U.S. Open Swim meet, Mohler won the 100m and 200m butterfly, setting a meet record in the former, and tied for first in the 200m freestyle with Kristen Heiss. She also set a meet record in the 4 × 200 m freestyle relay with the Athens Bulldogs.

=== 2009 US Open & 2009 World Championships ===
In the 2009 U.S. Open Swim meet, which also served as the US qualifying meet for the 2009 World Aquatics Championships, Mohler finished 2nd in the 200m fly with a 2:07.13. Because the top two finishers in each event get to swim it individually, this swim qualified Mohler for the 2009 World Aquatics Championships in Rome. She also finished 12th in 200m free, 8th in 100m back, and 4th in 100m fly.

In the preliminaries of the 200m butterfly, Mohler set a world record with a time of 2:04.14. This beat the old world record - set by Chinese swimmer Liu Zige in the 2008 Olympics - by just 0.04 of a second. Despite this outstanding performance, Mohler fell just short of a medal in the finals, finishing fourth with a time of 2:04.41, just 0.13 behind bronze medal winner Katinka Hosszú. The gold medalist, Australian swimmer Jessicah Schipper, broke Mohler's world record with a time of 2:03.41.

== Personal life ==
Mohler was born into an Italian-American family in Middlesex, New Jersey, and learned to swim at the age of six. Mohler has an older sister, Katie, and a younger sister, Patricia; the latter qualified to swim the 200 m butterfly in the 2004 US Olympic Trials alongside Mary. Her father, Robert DeScenza, works as a structural engineer and her mother, Margaret DeScenza, is a homemaker. She attended Rosary High School in Aurora, Illinois, and graduated from the University of Georgia in 2007 with a Bachelor of Science in Biology. Mohler's collegiate swimming career reached its peak as she became a four-time NCAA champion in the 200 butterfly.

Mohler's personality has been described by friends and family as very outgoing and quirky, so she has been known to have the nicknames of "Crazy" and "Crazy Mary". Mohler has a long-haired weiner dog named Speedo. Before swimming, she participated in soccer and softball. In addition, her favorite hobbies outside the pool are baking, reading, and shopping.

Currently, Mohler lives with her husband, Charlie, and their four kids, Maggie, Emily, Joey, and John. They married just weeks after she set the world record in the 200m butterfly.

== Personal best times ==
Mohler's former American record time of 2:04.14 in the 200m butterfly was broken on June 4, 2023 by Regan Smith.

Records
Stroke	Course	Time	Standard	Meet	Meet Date
50 Butterfly	Long Course Meters	27.25	"AA" and "All Times"	2003 World Championships	July 20, 2003
50 Butterfly	Short Course Meters	26.84	"All Times"	2006 SC World Champs	May 4, 2006
100 Butterfly	Short Course Meters	57.79	Summer Nationals (LCM)	2004 Women's NCAA Champs	March 18, 2004
100 Butterfly	Short Course Yards	51.56	Summer Nationals (LCM)	2006 Women's NCAA Champs	March 16, 2006
100 Butterfly	Long Course Meters	58.11	NRT	Missouri Grand Prix	February 13, 2009
200 Butterfly	Long Course Meters	2:04.14	Summer Nationals (LCM)	World Championships	July 29, 2009
200 Butterfly	Short Course Yards	1:51.28	Summer Nationals (LCM)	2009 So. CA Grand Prix Series	January 16, 2009
200 Butterfly	Short Course Meters	2:04.27	Summer Nationals (LCM)	2008 SC Worlds	September 4, 2008

== See also ==
- List of University of Georgia people
- List of World Aquatics Championships medalists in swimming (women)
- World record progression 200 metres butterfly

Records
Preceded by Liu Zige	Women's 200-meter butterfly world record-holder (long course); July 29, 2009 – July 30, 2009	Succeeded by Jessica Schipper
