= Audrey Lacroix =

Canadian swimmer

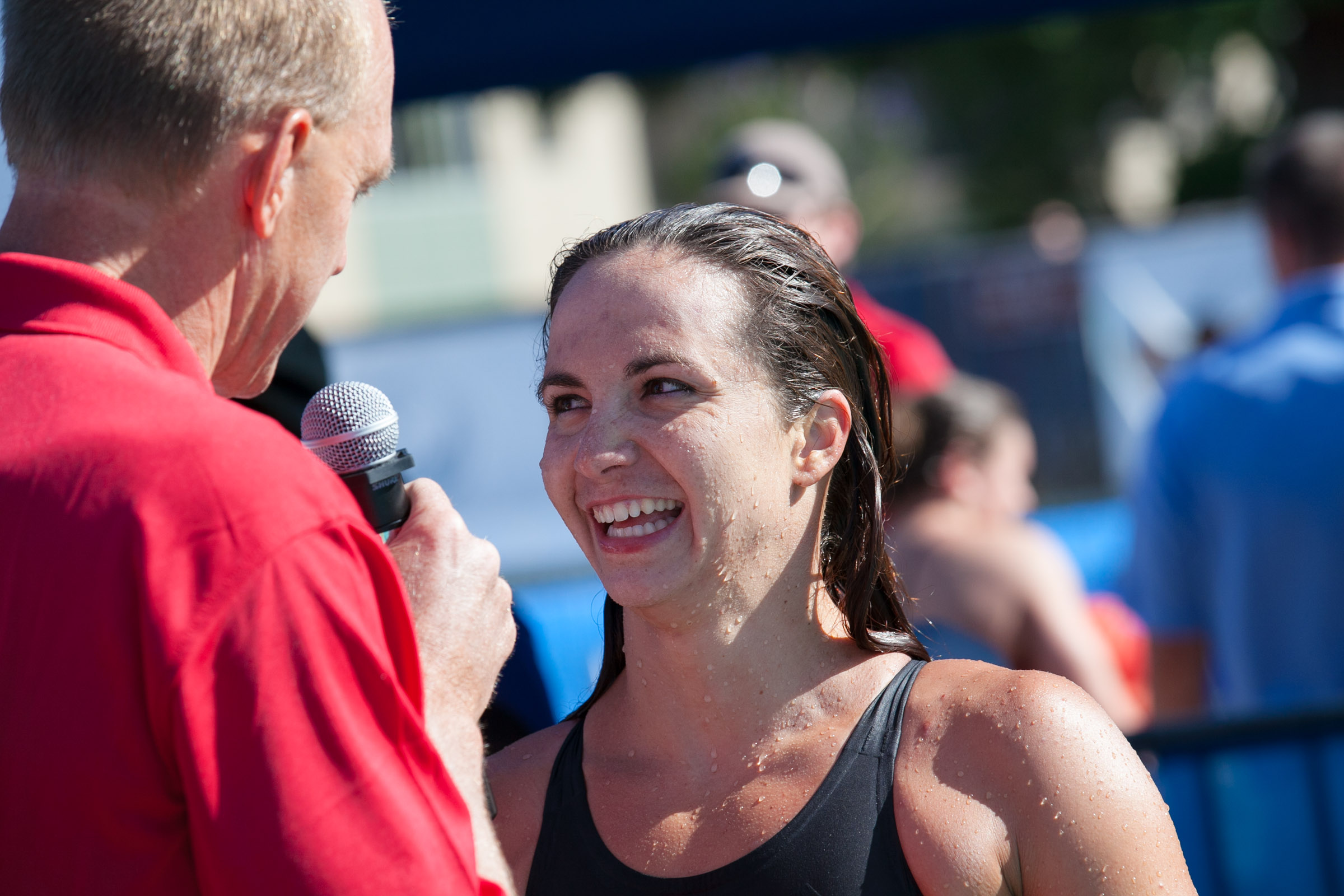
- Kazan 2015

Personal information
- Full name: Audrey Lacroix
- National team: Canada
- Born: November 17, 1983 (age 42) Pont-Rouge, Quebec
- Height: 1.63 m (5 ft 4 in)
- Weight: 53 kg (117 lb)

Sport
- Sport: Swimming
- Strokes: Butterfly, freestyle
- Club: Piscines du Parc Olympique
Medal record
Women's swimming
Representing Canada
World Championships (25m)
Bronze medal – third place	2004 Indianapolis	200 m butterfly
Pan American Games
Gold medal – first place	2003 Santo Domingo	200 m butterfly
Gold medal – first place	2015 Toronto	200 m butterfly
Silver medal – second place	2003 Santo Domingo	100 m butterfly
Silver medal – second place	2003 Santo Domingo	4x100 m freestyle
Silver medal – second place	2003 Santo Domingo	4x100 m medley
Commonwealth Games
Gold medal – first place	2014 Glasgow	200 m butterfly
Silver medal – second place	2010 Delhi	200 m butterfly
Bronze medal – third place	2006 Melbourne	100 m butterfly
Bronze medal – third place	2010 Delhi	4x100 m medley
Bronze medal – third place	2014 Glasgow	4x100 m medley
Summer Universiade
Gold medal – first place	2007 Bangkok	200 m butterfly

Audrey Lacroix (born November 17, 1983) is a retired Canadian competitive swimmer from Montreal, Quebec. She is the Canadian record-holder in the 200-metre butterfly (short-course and long-course). She is a former world record-holder in the short-course 4x100-metre medley relay along with teammates Katy Murdoch, Annamay Pierse and Victoria Poon. She was a member of the Canadian team that finished 8th in the 4x100-metre freestyle relay and in 7th place in the 4x100-metre medley relay at the 2008 Summer Olympics. She won the gold medal in 200-metre butterfly at the 2014 Commonwealth Games. and a bronze in the women's 4x100-metre medley relay. She also swam in the 100-metre butterfly final, finishing seventh with a time of 58.78.

In 2016, she was officially named to Canada's Olympic team for the 2016 Summer Olympics.

== See also ==
- List of Commonwealth Games medallists in swimming (women)
- World record progression 4 × 100 metres medley relay
