= Swimming at the 2009 World Aquatics Championships – Women's 100 metre butterfly =

Women's 100 metre butterfly at the 2009 FINA World Championships
- Venue: Foro Italico
- Dates: 26 July 2009 (heats, semifinals); 27 August 2009 (final)
- Competitors: 102
- Winning time: 56.06 WR

Medalists
gold medal	Sarah Sjöström	Sweden
silver medal	Jessicah Schipper	Australia
bronze medal	Jiao Liuyang	China

The first heats of the Women's 100 m Butterfly took place on the morning of Sunday, 26 July. The semi-final took place in the evening session of 26 July and the final took place on the evening of 27 July at the Foro Italico in Rome, Italy. In the final, 7 of the 8 swimmers finished within the same second, and 5 within the same 0.1 of a second.

== Records ==
Prior to this competition, the existing world and competition records were as follows:

World record	Inge de Bruijn (NED)	56.61	Sydney, Australia	17 September 2000
Championship record	Libby Lenton (AUS)	57.15	Melbourne, Australia	26 March 2007

The following records were established during the competition:

Date	Round	Name	Nationality	Time	Record
26 July	Heat 9	Sarah Sjöström	Sweden	56.76	CR
26 July	Semifinal 2	Sarah Sjöström	Sweden	56.44	WR
27 July	Final	Sarah Sjöström	Sweden	56.06	WR

== Results ==
=== Heats ===
Rank	Name	Nationality	Time	Heat	Lane	Notes
1	Sarah Sjöström	Sweden	56.76	9	6	CR, NR
2	Dana Vollmer	USA	57.15	10	5	
3	Jessicah Schipper	Australia	57.17	10	4	
4	Yafei Zhou	China	57.34	10	8	
5	Christine Magnuson	USA	57.48	9	4	
6	Jeanette Ottesen	Denmark	57.58	10	7	NR
7	Ingvild Snildal	Norway	57.67	10	9	NR
8	Aurore Mongel	France	57.75	11	6	NR
9	Felicity Galvez	Australia	57.76	9	3	
10	Jiao Liuyang	China	57.90	11	5	
11	Annika Mehlhorn	Germany	58.04	9	7	NR
12	Marleen Veldhuis	Netherlands	58.06	11	4	
13	Ellen Gandy	Great Britain	58.07	9	5	
14	Daynara de Paula	Brazil	58.26	9	8	
15	Yuka Kato	Japan	58.31	10	6	
16	Gabriella Silva	Brazil	58.35	10	2	
17	Jemma Lowe	Great Britain	58.60	10	3	
18	Eszter Dara	Hungary	58.61	11	7	
19	Kimberly Buys	Belgium	58.62	9	1	NR
20	Audrey Lacroix	Canada	58.67	8	5	NR
21	Irina Bespalova	Russia	58.74	10	0	
22	Ilaria Bianchi	Italy	58.81	9	2	
23	Triin Aljand	Estonia	59.00	8	3	NR
23	Yui Miyamoto	Japan	59.00	11	8	
25	Amit Ivry	Israel	59.02	11	9	
26	Micha Kathrine Østergaard Jensen	Denmark	59.06	11	2	
27	Sara Isakovič	Slovenia	59.10	11	1	
28	Chantal Groot	Netherlands	59.24	11	0	
29	Caterina Giacchetti	Italy	59.60	8	4	
30	Emilia Pikkarainen	Finland	59.69	8	6	
31	Tao Li	Singapore	59.73	11	3	
32	Kateryna Zubkova	Ukraine	59.77	9	0	
33	Orsolya Tompa	Hungary	59.85	8	8	
34	Martina Van Berkel	Switzerland	59.87	8	1	NR
35	Birgit Koschischek	Austria	59.93	9	9	
36	Gabriella Fagundez	Sweden	59.95	10	1	
37	Kristina Tchernychev	Israel	1:00.32	8	0	
38	Anna Yevchak	Ukraine	1:00.37	7	6	
39	Anna Schoholeva	Cyprus	1:00.42	7	5	
40	Iryna Niafedava	Belarus	1:00.46	8	9	
41	Rita Medrano	Mexico	1:00.47	7	1	NR
42	Carolina Colorado Henao	Colombia	1:00.50	8	7	
43	Arianna Vanderpool-Wallace	Bahamas	1:00.56	6	7	NR
44	Laetitia Perez	Switzerland	1:00.67	7	4	
45	Sze Hang Yu	Hong Kong	1:00.83	6	5	
46	Iris Rosenberger	Turkey	1:00.86	7	7	
47	Mirela Olczak	Poland	1:00.93	7	3	
48	Kelly Shim Robinson	Hong Kong	1:01.05	7	0	
49	Lenka Jarosova	Czech Republic	1:01.19	6	1	
50	Fella Bennaceur	Algeria	1:01.22	6	3	NR
51	Katarina Listopadova	Slovakia	1:01.24	7	2	
52	Linda Laihorinne	Finland	1:01.27	6	0	
53	Maida Turnadzic	Bosnia and Herzegovina	1:01.31	8	2	
54	Alana Dillette	Bahamas	1:01.51	6	4	
55	Elimar Barrios	Venezuela	1:01.95	7	8	
56	Sofija Djelic	Slovenia	1:02.09	7	9	
57	Marellyn Lammert Liew	Malaysia	1:02.14	6	2	
58	Christine Mailliet	Luxembourg	1:02.22	5	3	
59	Yasemin Rosenberger	Turkey	1:02.52	6	9	
60	Kristina Bernice Lennox	Puerto Rico	1:02.56	6	6	
61	Aiste Dobrovolskaite	Lithuania	1:02.60	5	5	NR
62	Eliana Barrios	Venezuela	1:02.92	5	4	
63	Loren Yamile Bahamonde	Ecuador	1:03.05	6	8	
64	Farida Osman	Egypt	1:03.21	5	6	
65	Koh Ting Ting	Singapore	1:03.25	5	7	
66	Yumisleisy Morales Mendoza	Cuba	1:03.33	5	9	
67	Grite Apanaviciute	Lithuania	1:03.38	5	2	
68	Binta Zahra Diop	Senegal	1:03.47	5	1	
69	Ting Sheng-Yo	Chinese Taipei	1:03.77	5	0	
70	Marie Laura Meza	Costa Rica	1:04.18	4	3	
71	Ileana Murillo	El Salvador	1:04.21	4	6	
72	Maria Georgina Gandionco	Finland	1:04.34	4	2	
72	Ramond Sherazad	Morocco	1:04.34	5	8	
74	Laura Lucia Paz Chavez	Honduras	1:04.45	4	0	
75	Karrakchou Lilia	Morocco	1:04.95	4	9	
76	Chen Ting	Chinese Taipei	1:05.06	4	5	
77	Pooja Raghava Alva	India	1:05.13	4	8	
78	Davina Mangion	Malta	1:05.41	3	5	
79	Simona Muccioli	San Marino	1:05.55	4	4	
80	Karen Milenka Torrez Guzman	Bolivia	1:05.64	3	3	
81	Vandita Dhariyal	India	1:05.80	2	2	
82	Daniela Reyes Hinrichsen	Chile	1:05.83	3	8	
83	Dalia Torrez	Nicaragua	1:05.93	3	4	
84	Moira Fraser	Zimbabwe	1:06.05	3	6	
85	Ma Cheok Mei	Macau	1:06.51	4	7	
86	Sharon Paola Fajardo Sierra	Honduras	1:07.07	4	1	
87	Silvie Ketelaars	Netherlands Antilles	1:07.42	3	7	
88	Monica Bernardo	Mozambique	1:07.52	3	0	
89	Shalia Millum Gardarnar	Faroe Islands	1:08.17	3	9	
90	Razan Taha	Jordan	1:08.28	2	5	
91	Amina Meho	Lebanon	1:08.39	3	2	
92	Rachita Shah	Kenya	1:08.89	2	9	
93	Talisa Pace	Malta	1:09.10	2	4	
94	Li Chuen Cheong Estelle Anais	Mauritius	1:09.51	2	6	
95	Gessica Stagno	Mozambique	1:09.67	2	1	
96	Miniruwani Samarakoon	Sri Lanka	1:09.99	2	8	
97	Tieri Erasito	Fiji	1:11.63	2	0	
98	Ashley Bransford	Aruba	1:13.51	2	3	
99	Adele Rova	Fiji	1:14.04	1	5	
100	Tin Hon Ko Adeline Mei-Li	Mauritius	1:14.08	2	7	
101	Gantumur Oyungerel	Mongolia	1:14.99	1	4	
102	Aelia Mehdi	Pakistan	1:25.88	1	3	

Key: CR = Championship record, NR = National record

=== Semifinals ===
Rank	Name	Nationality	Time	Heat	Lane	Notes
1	Sarah Sjöström	Sweden	56.44	2	4	WR
2	Jessicah Schipper	Australia	57.08	2	5	
3	Dana Vollmer	United States	57.19	1	4	
4	Ingvild Snildal	Norway	57.20	2	6	NR
5	Jiao Liuyang	China	57.25	1	2	
6	Aurore Mongel	France	57.39	1	6	NR
7	Gabriella Silva	Brazil	57.42	1	8	SA
8	Marleen Veldhuis	Netherlands	57.56	1	7	
8	Yafei Zhou	China	57.56	1	5	
10	Christine Magnuson	United States	57.59	2	3	
11	Jeanette Ottesen	Denmark	57.65	1	3	
12	Daynara de Paula	Brazil	57.68	1	1	
13	Felicity Galvez	Australia	57.71	2	2	
14	Annika Mehlhorn	Germany	57.90	2	7	NR
15	Yuka Kato	Japan	57.95	2	8	
16	Ellen Gandy	Great Britain	58.25	2	1	

==== Swim-off ====
Rank	Name	Nationality	Time	Lane	Notes
1	Marleen Veldhuis	Netherlands	57.38	4	
2	Yafei Zhou	China	57.62	5	

=== Finals ===
Rank	Name	Nationality	Time	Lane	Notes
1st place, gold medalist(s)	Sarah Sjöström	Sweden	56.06	4	WR
2nd place, silver medalist(s)	Jessicah Schipper	Australia	56.23	5	OC
3rd place, bronze medalist(s)	Jiao Liuyang	China	56.86	2	AS
4	Aurore Mongel	France	56.89	7	NR
5	Gabriella Silva	Brazil	56.94	1	=AM
5	Dana Vollmer	United States	56.94	3	=AM
7	Ingvild Snildal	Norway	56.96	6	NR
8	Marleen Veldhuis	Netherlands	57.79	8	

Note: The Dutch Record in this event is Inge de Bruijn's former World Record (56.61), which may help to explain why Veldhuis was the only finalist not to set a National Record (NR).
