= Swimming at the 2011 World Aquatics Championships – Women's 4 × 100 metre medley relay =

Women's 4 x 100 metre medley at the 2011 World Aquatics Championships
- Dates: July 30, 2011 (heats and final)
- Competitors: 81 from 17 nations
- Winning time: 3:52.36

Medalists
gold medal	Natalie Coughlin; Rebecca Soni; Dana Vollmer; Missy Franklin	United States
silver medal	Zhao Jing; Ji Liping; Lu Ying; Tang Yi	China
bronze medal	Belinda Hocking; Leisel Jones; Alicia Coutts; Merindah Dingjan	Australia

The women's 4 x 100 metre medley competition of the swimming events at the 2011 World Aquatics Championships was held on July 30 with the heats and the final.

The American team consisting of Natalie Coughlin, Rebecca Soni, Dana Vollmer, and Missy Franklin won the gold in an Americas record time of 3:52.36.

== Records ==
Prior to the competition, the existing world and championship records were as follows.

	Name	Nation	Time	Location	Date
World record Championship record	Zhao Jing (58.98); Chen Huijia (1:04.12); Jiao Liuyang (56.28); Li Zhesi (52.81)	China	3:52.19	Rome	August 1, 2009

== Results ==
=== Heats ===
17 teams participated in 3 heats.

Rank	Heat	Lane	Nation	Athletes	Time	Notes
1	3	4	United States	Elizabeth Pelton (1:00.19); Rebecca Soni (1:04.97); Christine Magnuson (57.54); Amanda Weir (54.25)	3:56.95	Q
2	3	6	Russia	Anastasia Zuyeva (59.53); Yuliya Yefimova (1:06.31); Irina Bespalova (58.77); Veronika Popova (54.47)	3:59.08	Q
3	3	5	China	Gao Chang (1:01.07); Sun Ye (1:07.12); Jiao Liuyang (57.82); Li Zhesi (53.43)	3:59.44	Q
4	2	4	Australia	Stephanie Rice (1:01.47); Leisel Jones (1:06.71); Alicia Coutts (57.21); Merindah Dingjan (54.23)	3:59.62	Q
5	2	5	Great Britain	Georgia Davies (1:00.15); Kate Haywood (1:08.19); Jemma Lowe (57.28); Amy Smith (54.03)	3:59.65	Q
6	1	4	Japan	Aya Terakawa (1:00.40); Satomi Suzuki (1:07.15); Yuka Kato (58.40); Haruka Ueda (54.13)	4:00.08	Q
7	3	3	Canada	Sinead Russell (1:00.16); Jillian Tyler (1:07.70); Katerine Savard (57.91); Chantal van Landeghem (54.95)	4:00.72	Q
8	2	3	Germany	Jenny Mensing (1:01.30); Sarah Poewe (1:07.24); Sina Sutter (58.65); Daniela Schreiber (53.71)	4:00.90	Q
9	1	3	Denmark	Mie Nielsen (1:01.73); Rikke Pedersen (1:07.49); Jeanette Ottesen (58.07); Pernille Blume (54.31)	4:01.60	
10	1	5	Sweden	Sarah Sjöström (1:01.24); Joline Höstman (1:08.71); Martina Granström (58.27); Ida Marko-Varga (54.49)	4:02.71	
11	2	7	Netherlands	Femke Heemskerk (1:01.30); Moniek Nijhuis (1:08.64); Inge Dekker (58.27); Maud van der Meer (54.99)	4:03.20	
12	2	6	Spain	Duane da Rocha (1:01.27); Marina Garcia Urzainque (1:08.65); Judit Ignacio Sorribes (59.03); Maria Fuster (55.03)	4:03.98	NR
13	3	2	France	Alexianne Castel (1:01.30); Sophie de Ronchi (1:08.57); Aurore Mongel (59.65); Camille Muffat (54.53)	4:04.05	
14	1	6	Italy	Elena Gemo (1:02.65); Chiara Boggiatto (1:08.21); Ilaria Bianchi (59.05); Federica Pellegrini (54.83)	4:04.74	NR
15	1	2	South Africa	Karin Prinsloo (1:01.30); Suzaan van Biljon (1:09.10); Vanessa Mohr (58.43); Leone Vorster (56.14)	4:04.97	
16	1	7	Finland	Anni Alitalo (1:04.37); Jenna Laukkanen (1:08.93); Emilia Pikkarainen (1:00.90); Hanna-Maria Seppala (54.27)	4:08.47	NR
17	3	7	Brazil	Etiene Medeiros (1:04.27); Carolina Mussi (1:14.32); Daynara de Paula (1:00.12); Tatiana Lemos (55.81)	4:14.52	
–	2	2	South Korea			DNS

=== Final ===
The final was held at 19:45.

Rank	Lane	Nation	Athletes	Time	Notes
1st place, gold medalist(s)	4	United States	Natalie Coughlin (59.12); Rebecca Soni (1:04.71); Dana Vollmer (55.74); Missy Franklin (52.79)	3:52.36	AM
2nd place, silver medalist(s)	3	China	Zhao Jing (59.24); Ji Liping (1:06.27); Lu Ying (56.77); Tang Yi (53.33)	3:55.61	
3rd place, bronze medalist(s)	6	Australia	Belinda Hocking (59.91); Leisel Jones (1:06.18); Alicia Coutts (56.69); Merindah Dingjan (54.35)	3:57.13	
4	5	Russia	Anastasia Zuyeva (59.13); Yuliya Yefimova (1:05.91); Irina Bespalova (58.61); Veronika Popova (53.73)	3:57.38	NR
5	7	Japan	Aya Terakawa (1:00.02); Satomi Suzuki (1:06.30); Yuka Kato (57.55); Yayoi Matsumoto (53.97)	3:57.84	
6	2	Great Britain	Georgia Davies (59.95); Stacey Tadd (1:09.14); Ellen Gandy (57.97); Francesca Halsall (54.03)	4:01.09	
–	1	Canada	Sinead Russell (59.69); Jillian Tyler (–); Katerine Savard (–); Julia Wilkinson (–)		DSQ
–	8	Germany	Jenny Mensing (1:01.21); Sarah Poewe (–); Sina Sutter (–); Daniela Schreiber (–)		DSQ
