= Swimming at the 2008 Summer Olympics – Women's 100 metre butterfly =

Women's 100 metre butterfly at the Games of the XXIX Olympiad
- Venue: Beijing National Aquatics Center
- Date: August 9, 2008 (heats); August 10, 2008 (semifinals); August 11, 2008 (final)
- Competitors: 49 from 38 nations
- Winning time: 56.73 OC

Medalists
1st place, gold medalist(s)		Lisbeth Trickett	Australia
2nd place, silver medalist(s)		Christine Magnuson	United States
3rd place, bronze medalist(s)		Jessicah Schipper	Australia

The women's 100 metre butterfly event at the 2008 Olympic Games took place on 9–11 August at the Beijing National Aquatics Center in Beijing, China.

Top favorite Lisbeth Trickett powered past the entire field to earn Australia's second straight gold in the event. She posted a lifetime best of 56.73, just 0.12 of a second outside the world record set by Dutch swimmer Inge de Bruijn at the 2000 Summer Olympics in Sydney. U.S. swimmer Christine Magnuson took home the silver in 57.10, while Trickett's teammate Jessicah Schipper picked up the bronze in 57.25, handing an entire medal haul for the Aussies in the pool.

China's Zhou Yafei finished fourth with a time of 57.84, while Tao Li made a historic milestone for Singapore as she became the nation's first ever swimmer to reach an Olympic final, earning a fifth spot in 57.99. Meanwhile, Great Britain's Jemma Lowe (58.06), Brazil's Gabriella Silva (58.10), and Netherlands' Inge Dekker (58.54) closed out the field.

== Records ==
Prior to this competition, the existing world and Olympic records were as follows.

World record	Inge de Bruijn (NED)	56.61	Sydney, Australia	17 September 2000
Olympic record	Inge de Bruijn (NED)	56.61	Sydney, Australia	17 September 2000

== Results ==
=== Heats ===
Rank	Heat	Lane	Name	Nationality	Time	Notes
1	6	4	Jessicah Schipper	Australia	57.58	Q
2	5	4	Christine Magnuson	United States	57.70	Q
2	6	3	Zhou Yafei	China	57.70	Q, AS
4	4	5	Tao Li	Singapore	57.77	Q
5	5	8	Gabriella Silva	Brazil	58.00	Q
6	5	5	Elaine Breeden	United States	58.06	Q
7	4	1	Ilaria Bianchi	Italy	58.12	Q
8	5	1	Lize-Mari Retief	South Africa	58.20	Q, AF
9	6	5	Inge Dekker	Netherlands	58.22	Q
10	7	7	Aurore Mongel	France	58.30	Q
11	5	6	Natalya Sutyagina	Russia	58.32	Q
12	7	4	Lisbeth Trickett	Australia	58.37	Q
13	6	2	Eszter Dara	Hungary	58.39	Q, NR
14	7	2	Alena Popchanka	France	58.40	Q
15	5	3	Jeanette Ottesen	Denmark	58.44	Q
16	7	5	Jemma Lowe	Great Britain	58.49	Q
17	4	6	Otylia Jędrzejczak	Poland	58.53	
18	4	2	Mandy Loots	South Africa	58.61	
18	5	2	Yuko Nakanishi	Japan	58.61	
20	4	4	Sara Isakovič	Slovenia	58.68	NR
21	7	3	Francesca Halsall	Great Britain	58.70	
22	6	6	Irina Bespalova	Russia	58.92	
23	6	7	Yuka Kato	Japan	58.94	
24	4	3	Kateryna Zubkova	Ukraine	58.99	NR
25	6	1	Martina Moravcová	Slovakia	59.03	
26	3	4	Birgit Koschischek	Austria	59.07	NR
27	7	6	Sarah Sjöström	Sweden	59.08	
28	4	8	Audrey Lacroix	Canada	59.10	
28	6	8	Micha Kathrine Østergaard Jensen	Denmark	59.10	
30	3	1	Hannah Wilson	Hong Kong	59.35	
30	5	7	Chantal Groot	Netherlands	59.35	
32	2	4	Triin Aljand	Estonia	59.43	NR
32	7	8	Xu Yanwei	China	59.43	
34	4	7	Daynara de Paula	Brazil	59.45	
35	3	6	Sara Oliveira	Portugal	59.48	
36	3	5	Anna Gostomelsky	Israel	59.50	
37	3	2	Ingvild Snildal	Norway	59.86	
38	3	7	Carolina Colorado Henao	Colombia	1:00.06	
39	7	1	Daniela Samulski	Germany	1:00.37	
40	2	5	Choi Hye-ra	South Korea	1:00.65	
41	3	3	Eirini Kavarnou	Greece	1:00.74	
42	3	8	Heather Brand	Zimbabwe	1:01.39	
43	2	6	Yang Chin-kuei	Chinese Taipei	1:01.60	
44	2	3	Iris Rosenberger	Turkey	1:01.67	
45	2	2	Natalia Hadjiloizou	Cyprus	1:01.80	
46	2	7	Emilia Pikkarainen	Finland	1:02.31	
47	1	5	Binta Zahra Diop	Senegal	1:04.26	
48	1	4	Antonella Scanavino	Uruguay	1:04.28	
49	1	3	Simona Muccioli	San Marino	1:04.91	

=== Semifinals ===
==== Semifinal 1 ====
Rank	Lane	Name	Nationality	Time	Notes
1	7	Lisbeth Trickett	Australia	57.05	Q
2	4	Christine Magnuson	United States	57.08	Q, AM
3	5	Tao Li	Singapore	57.54	Q, AS
4	8	Jemma Lowe	Great Britain	57.78	Q, NR
5	2	Aurore Mongel	France	58.46	
6	1	Alena Popchanka	France	58.55	
6	3	Elaine Breeden	United States	58.55	
8	6	Lize-Mari Retief	South Africa	58.63	

==== Semifinal 2 ====
Rank	Lane	Name	Nationality	Time	Notes
1	4	Jessicah Schipper	Australia	57.43	Q
2	5	Zhou Yafei	China	57.68	Q
3	2	Inge Dekker	Netherlands	58.20	Q
4	3	Gabriella Silva	Brazil	58.39	Q
5	1	Eszter Dara	Hungary	58.84	
6	7	Natalya Sutyagina	Russia	59.07	
7	8	Jeanette Ottesen	Denmark	59.29	
	6	Ilaria Bianchi	Italy	DSQ	

=== Final ===
Rank	Lane	Name	Nationality	Time	Notes
1st place, gold medalist(s)	4	Lisbeth Trickett	Australia	56.73	OC
2nd place, silver medalist(s)	5	Christine Magnuson	United States	57.10	
3rd place, bronze medalist(s)	3	Jessicah Schipper	Australia	57.25	
4	2	Zhou Yafei	China	57.84	
5	6	Tao Li	Singapore	57.99	
6	7	Jemma Lowe	Great Britain	58.06	
7	8	Gabriella Silva	Brazil	58.10	
8	1	Inge Dekker	Netherlands	58.54	
