= Swimming at the 2012 Summer Olympics – Women's 100 metre butterfly =

Women's 100 metre butterfly at the Games of the XXX Olympiad
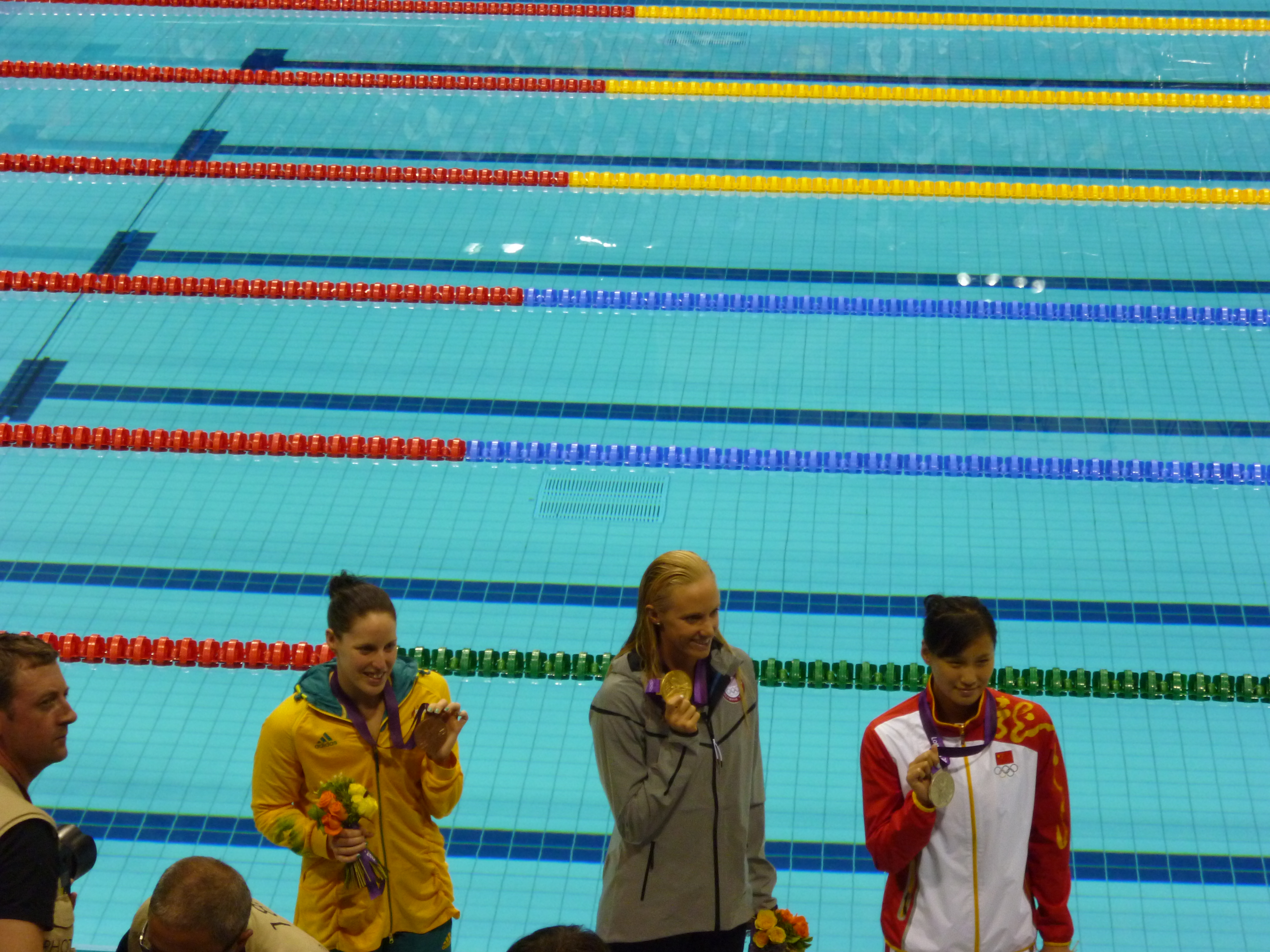
- Medal winners
- Venue: London Aquatics Centre
- Dates: July 28, 2012 (heats & semifinals); July 29, 2012 (final)
- Competitors: 42 from 37 nations
- Winning time: 55.98 WR

Medalists
1st place, gold medalist(s)		Dana Vollmer	United States
2nd place, silver medalist(s)		Lu Ying	China
3rd place, bronze medalist(s)		Alicia Coutts	Australia

The women's 100 metre butterfly event at the 2012 Summer Olympics took place on 28–29 July at the London Aquatics Centre in London, United Kingdom.

U.S. swimmer Dana Vollmer demolished a new world record to clear a 56-second barrier and to claim the Olympic title in the event for the first time since Amy Van Dyken did so in 1996. She touched third at the initial length, but powered home with a back-half strategy on the final stretch to capture the gold in 55.98, the first sub-56 second time in the event's history, shaving 0.08 seconds off the previous record set by Sweden's Sarah Sjöström in a since-banned high-tech body suit from the 2009 World Championships. China's Lu Ying came from behind with the same tactic to grab a silver in 56.87, while Australia's Alicia Coutts nearly pulled from worst-to-podium effort after turning last at the 50-metre lap to put up a late resistant surge for the bronze in 56.94.

Sjostrom, the former world record holder, finished off the podium with a fourth-place time in 57.17, and was followed in fifth by Italy's Ilaria Bianchi at a lifetime best and national record of 57.27. Denmark's Jeanette Ottesen Gray paid for an aggressive strategy with an early lead on the first half, before fading to sixth in 57.35. Vollmer's teammate Claire Donahue (57.48) and Great Britain's Ellen Gandy (57.76) rounded out the field. For the first time in Olympic history, all eight finalists finished the race under a 58-second barrier.

Earlier in the prelims, Vollmer posted both a textile and an American best of 56.25 to lead all swimmers for the top seed, wiping out Inge de Bruijn's 2000 Olympic record by 36-hundredths of a second.

Notable swimmers missed the final roster including Singapore's Tao Li, who delivered a surprise fifth-place finish in Beijing four years earlier; Gandy's home teammate Francesca Halsall; Poland's four-time Olympian Otylia Jędrzejczak; Australia's defending bronze medalist Jessicah Schipper; and Netherlands' Inge Dekker, who later scratched the semifinals to focus on her 4×100 m freestyle relay duty.

== Records ==
Prior to this competition, the existing world and Olympic records were as follows.

World record	Sarah Sjöström (SWE)	56.06	Rome, Italy	27 July 2009	
Olympic record	Inge de Bruijn (NED)	56.61	Sydney, Australia	17 September 2000	–

The following records were established during the competition:

Date	Round	Name	Nationality	Time	Record
July 28	Heat 6	Dana Vollmer	United States	56.25	OR
July 29	Final	Dana Vollmer	United States	55.98	WR

== Results ==
=== Heats ===
Rank	Heat	Lane	Name	Nationality	Time	Notes
1	6	4	Dana Vollmer	United States	56.25	Q, OR, AM
2	6	5	Lu Ying	China	57.17	Q
3	4	4	Alicia Coutts	Australia	57.36	Q
4	5	4	Sarah Sjöström	Sweden	57.45	Q
5	6	7	Jeanette Ottesen	Denmark	57.64	Q
6	6	6	Jiao Liuyang	China	57.71	Q
7	6	3	Claire Donahue	United States	58.06	Q
8	4	5	Francesca Halsall	Great Britain	58.23	Q
9	5	5	Ellen Gandy	Great Britain	58.25	Q
10	5	3	Inge Dekker	Netherlands	58.30	Q, WD
11	4	8	Tao Li	Singapore	58.34	Q
12	5	7	Ilaria Bianchi	Italy	58.42	Q
13	4	2	Aliaksandra Herasimenia	Belarus	58.50	Q, NR
14	5	2	Martina Granström	Sweden	58.70	Q
15	4	3	Yuka Kato	Japan	58.72	Q
16	4	7	Kristel Vourna	Greece	58.74	Q
17	5	6	Katerine Savard	Canada	58.76	Q
18	5	8	Amit Ivry	Israel	58.78	
19	3	3	Irina Bespalova	Russia	58.79	
19	6	8	Kimberly Buys	Belgium	58.79	
21	4	1	Alexandra Wenk	Germany	58.85	
22	6	2	Ingvild Snildal	Norway	59.01	
23	5	1	Natsumi Hoshi	Japan	59.06	
24	4	6	Jessicah Schipper	Australia	59.17	
25	3	5	Otylia Jędrzejczak	Poland	59.31	
26	2	3	Danielle Villars	Switzerland	59.42	NR
26	2	4	Judit Ignacio Sorribes	Spain	59.42	
28	3	7	Denisa Smolenová	Slovakia	59.48	
29	3	6	Emilia Pikkarainen	Finland	59.55	
30	3	1	Hannah Wilson	Hong Kong	59.59	
31	2	7	Sara Isaković	Slovenia	59.86	
32	2	2	Sarah Blake Bateman	Iceland	59.87	NR
33	6	1	Daynara de Paula	Brazil	1:00.14	
34	3	2	Liliána Szilágyi	Hungary	1:00.34	
35	2	6	Triin Aljand	Estonia	1:00.43	
36	3	8	Sara Oliveira	Portugal	1:00.44	
37	3	4	Birgit Koschischek	Austria	1:00.54	
38	2	5	Justine Bruno	France	1:01.14	
39	2	1	Dalia Torrez Zamora	Nicaragua	1:05.42	
40	1	4	Noel Borshi	Albania	1:05.49	
41	1	3	Dorian McMenemy	Dominican Republic	1:05.78	NR
42	1	5	Marie Laura Meza	Costa Rica	1:07.01	

=== Semifinals ===
==== Semifinal 1 ====
Rank	Lane	Name	Nationality	Time	Notes
1	5	Sarah Sjöström	Sweden	57.27	Q
2	4	Lu Ying	China	57.51	Q
3	3	Jiao Liuyang	China	58.04	
4	2	Tao Li	Singapore	58.18	
5	1	Yuka Kato	Japan	58.26	
6	7	Aliaksandra Herasimenia	Belarus	58.41	NR
7	6	Francesca Halsall	Great Britain	58.52	
8	8	Katerine Savard	Canada	59.22	

==== Semifinal 2 ====
Rank	Lane	Name	Nationality	Time	Notes
1	4	Dana Vollmer	United States	56.36	Q
2	5	Alicia Coutts	Australia	56.85	Q
3	3	Jeanette Ottesen	Denmark	57.25	Q, NR
4	6	Claire Donahue	United States	57.42	Q
5	2	Ellen Gandy	Great Britain	57.66	Q
6	7	Ilaria Bianchi	Italy	57.79	Q, NR
7	8	Kristel Vourna	Greece	58.31	NR
8	1	Martina Granström	Sweden	58.95	

=== Final ===
Rank	Lane	Name	Nationality	Time	Notes
1st place, gold medalist(s)	4	Dana Vollmer	United States	55.98	WR
2nd place, silver medalist(s)	7	Lu Ying	China	56.87	
3rd place, bronze medalist(s)	5	Alicia Coutts	Australia	56.94	
4	6	Sarah Sjöström	Sweden	57.17	
5	8	Ilaria Bianchi	Italy	57.27	NR
6	3	Jeanette Ottesen	Denmark	57.35	
7	2	Claire Donahue	United States	57.48	
8	1	Ellen Gandy	Great Britain	57.76	
