= 2012 FINA World Swimming Championships (25 m) – Women's 200 metre butterfly =

Women's 200m Butterfly at the 2012 Short Course Worlds
- Dates: 12 December (heats and final)
- Winning time: 2:02.20

Medalists
gold medal	Katinka Hosszú	Hungary
silver medal	Jiao Liuyang	China
bronze medal	Jemma Lowe	Great Britain

The women's 200 metre butterfly event at the 11th FINA World Swimming Championships (25m) took place 12 December 2012 at the Sinan Erdem Dome.

== Records ==
Prior to this competition, the existing world and championship records were as follows.

	Name	Nation	Time	Location	Date
World record	Liu Zige	China	2:00.78	Berlin	15 November 2009
Championship record	Mireia Belmonte	Spain	2:03.59	Dubai	15 December 2010

The following records were established during the competition:

Date	Event	Name	Nation	Time	Record
12 December	Final	Katinka Hosszú	Hungary	2:02.20	CR

== Results ==
=== Heats ===
34 swimmers participated in 4 heats.

Rank	Heat	Lane	Name	Time	Notes
1	2	4	Katinka Hosszú (HUN)	2:04.19	Q, NR
2	1	6	Jiao Liuyang (CHN)	2:04.88	Q
3	2	2	Kona Fujita (JPN)	2:05.42	Q
4	4	4	Kathleen Hersey (USA)	2:05.45	Q
5	4	5	Katerine Savard (CAN)	2:05.54	Q
6	4	6	Liu Zige (CHN)	2:05.96	Q
7	3	4	Jemma Lowe (GBR)	2:06.14	Q
8	2	7	Nao Kobayashi (JPN)	2:06.91	Q
9	2	6	Jasmine Tosky (USA)	2:07.28	
10	3	6	Judit Ignacio Sorribes (ESP)	2:08.02	
11	4	2	Veronika Popova (RUS)	2:08.33	
12	3	5	Stefania Pirozzi (ITA)	2:09.08	
13	3	2	Brianna Throssell (AUS)	2:09.08	
14	4	3	Martina van Berkel (SUI)	2:09.56	
15	3	7	Noemie It-Ting Thomas (CAN)	2:09.59	
16	3	3	Choi Hye-Ra (KOR)	2:09.97	
17	2	5	Alessia Polieri (ITA)	2:10.00	
18	2	8	Mandy Loots (RSA)	2:10.04	
19	4	7	Sara Oliveira (POR)	2:10.96	
20	3	8	Cheng Wan-Jung (TPE)	2:11.95	
21	3	1	Denisa Smolenová (SVK)	2:12.60	
22	3	0	Jasmin Rosenberger (TUR)	2:13.07	
23	4	1	Monalisa Arieswati Lorenza (INA)	2:13.42	
24	2	0	Jessica Camposano (COL)	2:15.28	
25	4	0	Melisa Akarsu (TUR)	2:16.38	
26	1	4	Megan Stephens (RSA)	2:16.84	
27	4	8	Raina Saumi Grahana (INA)	2:17.22	
28	4	9	Nguyễn Thị Kim Tuyến (VIE)	2:20.73	
29	2	9	Pooja Raghava Alva (IND)	2:21.24	
30	1	3	Tieri Erasito (FIJ)	2:22.33	NR
31	3	9	Zabrina Holder (BAR)	2:23.51	
32	1	7	Ana Semiruncic (MDA)	2:24.72	
33	1	5	Tan Chi Yan (MAC)	2:31.81	
	2	1	Danielle Villars (SUI)	DSQ	
	1	2	Wendy Rodríguez (VEN)	DNS	
	2	3	Anja Klinar (SLO)	DNS	

=== Final ===
The final was held at 19:32.

Rank	Lane	Name	Nationality	Time	Notes
1st place, gold medalist(s)	4	Katinka Hosszú	Hungary	2:02.20	CR, ER
2nd place, silver medalist(s)	5	Jiao Liuyang	China	2:02.28	
3rd place, bronze medalist(s)	1	Jemma Lowe	Great Britain	2:03.19	NR
4	7	Liu Zige	China	2:03.99	
5	6	Kathleen Hersey	United States	2:05.90	
6	2	Katerine Savard	Canada	2:06.56	
7	3	Kona Fujita	Japan	2:06.57	
8	8	Nao Kobayashi	Japan	2:08.95	
