= Swimming at the 2008 Summer Olympics – Women's 200 metre butterfly =

Women's 200 metre butterfly at the Games of the XXIX Olympiad
- Venue: Beijing National Aquatics Center
- Date: August 12, 2008 (heats); August 13, 2008 (semifinals); August 14, 2008 (final)
- Competitors: 36 from 28 nations
- Winning time: 2:04.18 WR

Medalists
1st place, gold medalist(s)		Liu Zige	China
2nd place, silver medalist(s)		Jiao Liuyang	China
3rd place, bronze medalist(s)		Jessicah Schipper	Australia

The women's 200 metre butterfly event at the 2008 Olympic Games took place on 12–14 August at the Beijing National Aquatics Center in Beijing, China.

In front of a large home crowd inside the Water Cube, Liu Zige powered past the entire field to capture a first gold medal for the host nation in swimming. She set a new world record of 2:04.18 to cut off a 1.22-second standard set by Australia's Jessicah Schipper at the 2006 Pan Pacific Championships in Victoria, British Columbia, Canada. She also enjoyed her teammate Jiao Liuyang handing an entire medal haul for China with a one–two finish. Jiao earned a silver medal as she overhauled Schipper on the final lap, and touched the wall in 2:04.72. Meanwhile, Schipper added a second bronze to her hardware from the 100 m butterfly, outside the record time of 2:06.26.

Poland's Otylia Jędrzejczak, the defending Olympic champion, finished outside the medals in fourth place at 2:07.02. Having won a bronze medal from Athens four years earlier, Japan's Yuko Nakanishi earned a fifth spot in 2:07.32, holding off France's Aurore Mongel (2:07.36) to sixth by four hundredths of a second (0.04). Americans Elaine Breeden (2:07.57) and Kathleen Hersey (2:08.23) closed out the field.

== Records ==
Prior to this competition, the existing world and Olympic records were as follows.

World record	Jessicah Schipper (AUS)	2:05.40	Victoria, Canada	17 August 2006	
Olympic record	Misty Hyman (USA)	2:05.88	Sydney, Australia	20 September 2000	-

The following new world and Olympic records were set during this competition.

Date	Event	Name	Nationality	Time	Record
August 14	Final	Liu Zige	China	2:04.18	WR

== Results ==
=== Heats ===
Rank	Heat	Lane	Name	Nationality	Time	Notes
1	3	2	Liu Zige	China	2:06.46	Q, NR
2	5	5	Aurore Mongel	France	2:06.49	Q, NR
3	3	4	Yuko Nakanishi	Japan	2:06.62	Q
4	5	6	Jiao Liuyang	China	2:06.89	Q
5	5	4	Otylia Jędrzejczak	Poland	2:06.91	Q
6	3	6	Natsumi Hoshi	Japan	2:07.02	Q
7	4	6	Kathleen Hersey	United States	2:07.65	Q
8	4	7	Micha Østergaard	Denmark	2:07.77	Q, NR
9	5	3	Elaine Breeden	United States	2:07.92	Q
10	4	5	Jemma Lowe	Great Britain	2:08.07	Q
11	4	4	Jessicah Schipper	Australia	2:08.11	Q
12	4	3	Audrey Lacroix	Canada	2:08.54	Q
13	5	2	Samantha Hamill	Australia	2:08.83	Q
14	4	8	Petra Granlund	Sweden	2:08.97	Q
15	4	2	Ellen Gandy	Great Britain	2:08.98	Q
16	2	6	Kathryn Meaklim	South Africa	2:09.41	Q, AF
17	2	4	Nina Dittrich	Austria	2:09.85	NR
18	5	7	Beatrix Boulsevicz	Hungary	2:10.00	
19	2	5	Sara Oliveira	Portugal	2:10.14	NR
20	3	8	Stephanie Horner	Canada	2:10.33	
21	3	7	Paola Cavallino	Italy	2:10.46	
22	5	8	Joanna Melo	Brazil	2:10.64	
23	5	1	Choi Hye-ra	South Korea	2:11.42	
24	2	8	Tetyana Khala	Ukraine	2:12.16	
25	4	1	Yana Martynova	Russia	2:12.47	
26	2	7	Tao Li	Singapore	2:12.63	NR
27	3	5	Emese Kovács	Hungary	2:12.73	
28	3	1	Magali Rousseau	France	2:13.12	
29	2	2	Yang Chin-Kuei	Chinese Taipei	2:13.26	
30	1	5	Eleftheria Evgenia Efstathiou	Greece	2:13.27	
31	2	1	Denisa Smolenová	Slovakia	2:13.81	
32	1	6	Gülşah Günenç	Turkey	2:14.44	NR
33	1	4	Ingvild Snildal	Norway	2:14.53	
34	1	3	Kristina Lennox-Silva	Puerto Rico	2:17.27	
	2	3	Georgina Bardach	Argentina	DNS	
	3	3	Sara Isakovič	Slovenia	DNS	

=== Semifinals ===
==== Semifinal 1 ====
Rank	Lane	Name	Nationality	Time	Notes
1	5	Jiao Liuyang	China	2:06.42	Q
2	4	Aurore Mongel	France	2:07.21	Q
3	2	Jemma Lowe	Great Britain	2:07.87	
4	3	Natsumi Hoshi	Japan	2:07.93	
5	6	Micha Østergaard	Denmark	2:09.29	
6	7	Audrey Lacroix	Canada	2:09.74	
7	1	Petra Granlund	Sweden	2:09.79	
8	8	Kathryn Meaklim	South Africa	2:11.74	

==== Semifinal 2 ====
Rank	Lane	Name	Nationality	Time	Notes
1	4	Liu Zige	China	2:06.25	Q, AS
2	7	Jessicah Schipper	Australia	2:06.34	Q
3	3	Otylia Jędrzejczak	Poland	2:06.78	Q
4	5	Yuko Nakanishi	Japan	2:06.96	Q
4	6	Kathleen Hersey	United States	2:06.96	Q
6	2	Elaine Breeden	United States	2:07.73	Q
7	1	Samantha Hamill	Australia	2:09.58	
8	8	Ellen Gandy	Great Britain	2:10.60	

=== Final ===
Rank	Lane	Name	Nationality	Time	Notes
1st place, gold medalist(s)	4	Liu Zige	China	2:04.18	WR
2nd place, silver medalist(s)	3	Jiao Liuyang	China	2:04.72	
3rd place, bronze medalist(s)	5	Jessicah Schipper	Australia	2:06.26	
4	6	Otylia Jędrzejczak	Poland	2:07.02	
5	2	Yuko Nakanishi	Japan	2:07.32	
6	1	Aurore Mongel	France	2:07.36	
7	8	Elaine Breeden	United States	2:07.57	
8	7	Kathleen Hersey	United States	2:08.23	
