= Swimming at the 2010 Asian Games – Women's 50 metre butterfly =

Women's 50 metre butterfly at the 2010 Asian Games
- Venue: Aoti Aquatics Centre
- Date: 18 November 2010
- Competitors: 18 from 12 nations

Medalists
| gold medal | Tao Li | Singapore |
| silver medal | Yuka Kato | Japan |
| bronze medal | Lu Ying | China |

The women's 50 metre butterfly event at the 2010 Asian Games took place on 18 November 2010 at Guangzhou Aoti Aquatics Centre.

There were 18 competitors from 12 countries who took part in this event. Three heats were held, the heat in which a swimmer competed did not formally matter for advancement, as the swimmers with the top eight times from the entire field qualified for the finals.

Defending champion Tao Li from Singapore won the gold medal again, Japanese swimmer Yuka Kato won the silver medal, Chinese swimmer Lu Ying won the bronze medal.

== Schedule ==
All times are China Standard Time (UTC+08:00)

| Date | Time | Event |
|---|---|---|
| Thursday, 18 November 2010 | 09:37 | Heats |
| Thursday, 18 November 2010 | 18:41 | Final |

== Records ==
Prior to this competition, the existing world, Asian and Games records were as follows.

| World Record | Therese Alshammar (SWE) | 25.07 | Rome, Italy | 31 July 2009 |
| Asian Record | Zhou Yafei (CHN) | 25.57 | Rome, Italy | 1 August 2009 |
| Games Record | Tao Li (SIN) | 26.73 | Doha, Qatar | 7 December 2006 |

== Results ==
=== Heats ===
| Rank | Heat | Athlete | Time | Notes |
|---|---|---|---|---|
| 1 | 1 | Lu Ying (CHN) | 26.52 | GR |
| 1 | 3 | Tao Li (SIN) | 26.52 | =GR |
| 3 | 2 | Yuka Kato (JPN) | 26.59 | |
| 4 | 3 | Jiao Liuyang (CHN) | 26.66 | |
| 5 | 1 | Sze Hang Yu (HKG) | 27.19 | |
| 6 | 2 | Hannah Wilson (HKG) | 27.25 | |
| 7 | 3 | Elmira Aigaliyeva (KAZ) | 27.61 | |
| 8 | 1 | Natsumi Hoshi (JPN) | 27.84 | |
| 9 | 1 | Natsaya Susuk (THA) | 28.42 | |
| 10 | 1 | Kim Ga-eul (KOR) | 28.84 | |
| 11 | 2 | Mylene Ong (SIN) | 28.88 | |
| 12 | 3 | Jasmine Al-Khaldi (PHI) | 28.93 | |
| 13 | 2 | Natnapa Prommuenwai (THA) | 29.00 | |
| 14 | 3 | Ma Cheok Mei (MAC) | 29.50 | |
| 15 | 2 | Nguyễn Thị Kim Tuyến (VIE) | 29.66 | |
| 16 | 2 | Tan Chi Yan (MAC) | 30.47 | |
| 17 | 1 | Sabine Hazboun (PLE) | 31.51 | |
| 18 | 3 | Gantömöriin Oyuungerel (MGL) | 34.26 | |

=== Final ===
| Rank | Athlete | Time | Notes |
|---|---|---|---|
| 1st place, gold medalist(s) | Tao Li (SIN) | 26.10 | GR |
| 2nd place, silver medalist(s) | Yuka Kato (JPN) | 26.27 | |
| 3rd place, bronze medalist(s) | Lu Ying (CHN) | 26.29 | |
| 4 | Jiao Liuyang (CHN) | 26.55 | |
| 5 | Sze Hang Yu (HKG) | 26.91 | |
| 6 | Hannah Wilson (HKG) | 26.97 | |
| 7 | Elmira Aigaliyeva (KAZ) | 27.72 | |
| 8 | Natsumi Hoshi (JPN) | 27.93 | |
