= Swimming at the 2010 Asian Games – Women's 100 metre butterfly =

Women's 100 metre butterfly at the 2010 Asian Games
- Venue: Aoti Aquatics Centre
- Date: 13 November 2010
- Competitors: 15 from 10 nations

Medalists
gold medal	Jiao Liuyang	China
silver medal	Tao Li	Singapore
bronze medal	Yuka Kato	Japan

The women's 100 metre butterfly event at the 2010 Asian Games took place on 13 November 2010 at Guangzhou Aoti Aquatics Centre.

There were 15 competitors from 10 countries who took part in this event. Two heats were held, the heat in which a swimmer competed did not formally matter for advancement, as the swimmers with the top eight times from the both field qualified for the finals.

Jiao Liuyang from China won the gold medal, Tao Li from Singapore won the silver medal, Japanese swimmer Yuka Kato finished with third place.

== Schedule ==
All times are China Standard Time (UTC+08:00)

Date	Time	Event
Saturday, 13 November 2010	09:24	Heats
Saturday, 13 November 2010	18:26	Final

== Records ==
Prior to this competition, the existing world, Asian and Games records were as follows.

World Record	Sarah Sjöström (SWE)	56.06	Rome, Italy	27 July 2009
Asian Record	Liu Zige (CHN)	56.07	Jinan, China	18 October 2009
Games Record	Liu Limin (CHN)	58.38	Hiroshima, Japan	6 October 1994

== Results ==
=== Heats ===
Rank	Heat	Athlete	Time	Notes
1	1	Yuka Kato (JPN)	58.61	
2	2	Jiao Liuyang (CHN)	59.03	
3	1	Hannah Wilson (HKG)	59.40	
4	1	Tao Li (SIN)	59.42	
5	2	Guo Fan (CHN)	59.51	
6	2	Sze Hang Yu (HKG)	59.52	
7	2	Natsumi Hoshi (JPN)	59.90	
8	1	Park Na-ri (KOR)	1:00.80	
9	2	Choi Hye-ra (KOR)	1:00.85	
10	1	Elmira Aigaliyeva (KAZ)	1:01.65	
11	2	Natnapa Prommuenwai (THA)	1:03.33	
12	1	Patarawadee Kittiya (THA)	1:03.54	
13	1	Jasmine Al-Khaldi (PHI)	1:03.61	
14	2	Nguyễn Thị Kim Tuyến (VIE)	1:05.02	
15	2	Ma Cheok Mei (MAC)	1:05.76	

=== Final ===
Rank	Athlete	Time	Notes
1st place, gold medalist(s)	Jiao Liuyang (CHN)	57.76	GR
2nd place, silver medalist(s)	Tao Li (SIN)	58.24	
3rd place, bronze medalist(s)	Yuka Kato (JPN)	58.46	
4	Hannah Wilson (HKG)	59.26	
5	Guo Fan (CHN)	59.45	
6	Natsumi Hoshi (JPN)	59.87	
7	Park Na-ri (KOR)	1:00.68	
8	Sze Hang Yu (HKG)	1:05.27	
