= Swimming at the 2012 Summer Olympics – Women's 4 × 100 metre medley relay =

Women's 4 × 100 metre medley relay at the Games of the XXX Olympiad
- Venue: London Aquatics Centre
- Dates: August 3, 2012 (heats); August 4, 2012 (final)
- Competitors: 84 from 16 nations
- Teams: 16
- Winning time: 3:52.05 WR

Medalists
1st place, gold medalist(s)		Missy Franklin, Rebecca Soni, Dana Vollmer, Allison Schmitt, Rachel Bootsma*, Breeja Larson*, Claire Donahue*, Jessica Hardy*	United States
2nd place, silver medalist(s)		Emily Seebohm, Leisel Jones, Alicia Coutts, Melanie Schlanger, Brittany Elmslie*	Australia
3rd place, bronze medalist(s)		Aya Terakawa, Satomi Suzuki, Yuka Kato, Haruka Ueda; *Indicates the swimmer only competed in the preliminary heats.	Japan

The women's 4 × 100 metre medley relay event at the 2012 Summer Olympics took place on 3–4 August at the London Aquatics Centre in London, United Kingdom.

The U.S. women's team won to beat a new world record and to reclaim their Olympic title after twelve years. Leading from the start, the foursome of Missy Franklin (58.50), Rebecca Soni (1:04.82), Dana Vollmer (55.48), and Allison Schmitt (53.25) put together a perfect ending with a gold-medal time in 3:52.05 to shave off China's global standard by 14-hundredths of a second from the 2009 World Championships at the peak of the high-tech bodysuit era.

Australia's Emily Seebohm (59.01), Leisel Jones (1:06.06), Alicia Coutts (56.41), and Melanie Schlanger (52.54) trailed behind their formidable rivals by a couple of seconds, but managed to take home a magnificent silver in 3:54.02. Pulling off a second-place finish, Jones also matched Ian Thorpe for the most medals by an Australian swimmer in her fourth straight Olympics with a remarkable overall tally of nine (three golds, five silver, and one bronze).

Japan's Aya Terakawa (58.99), Satomi Suzuki (1:05.96), Yuka Kato (57.36), and Haruka Ueda (53.42) ended on a spectacular fashion with a bronze medal in 3:55.73, holding off the robust Russian quartet of Anastasia Zuyeva (59.13), Yuliya Yefimova (1:04.98), Irina Bespalova (58.59), and Veronika Popova (53.33) by exactly three-tenths of a second (0.30), a fourth-place time in 3:56.03.

Outside the podium, China's Zhao Jing (59.86), Ji Liping (1:06.94), Lu Ying (56.80), and Tang Yi (52.81) could not produce a similar stellar performance in the medley relay with a fifth-place finish in 3:56.41, while the Dutch foursome of Sharon van Rouwendaal (1:00.72), Moniek Nijhuis (1:06.74), Inge Dekker (56.91), and star Ranomi Kromowidjojo (52.91), who captured another sprint freestyle title an hour earlier, claimed a distant sixth spot in 3:57.28. Denmark (3:57.76) and Great Britain (3:59.46) rounded out the championship finale.

== Records ==
Prior to this competition, the existing world and Olympic records were as follows.

World record	China (CHN); Zhao Jing (58.98); Chen Huijia (1:04.12); Jiao Liuyang (56.28); Li Zhesi (52.81)	3:52.19	Rome, Italy	1 August 2009
Olympic record	Australia; Emily Seebohm (59.33); Leisel Jones (1:04.58); Jessicah Schipper (56.25); Lisbeth Trickett (52.53)	3:52.69	Beijing, China	17 August 2008

The following records were established during the competition:

Date	Event	Swimmers	Nation	Time	Record
August 4	Final	Missy Franklin (58.50); Rebecca Soni (1:04.82); Dana Vollmer (55.48); Allison Schmitt (53.25)	United States	3:52.05	WR

== Results ==
=== Heats ===
Rank	Heat	Lane	Nation	Swimmers	Time	Notes
1	2	5	Australia	Emily Seebohm (58.57); Leisel Jones (1:05.96); Alicia Coutts (57.45); Brittany Elmslie (53.44)	3:55.42	Q
2	2	3	Japan	Aya Terakawa (59.19); Satomi Suzuki (1:07.15); Yuka Kato (57.73); Haruka Ueda (53.80)	3:57.87	Q
3	2	2	Denmark	Mie Østergaard Nielsen (1:00.27); Rikke Møller Pedersen (1:07.15); Jeanette Ottesen (56.74); Pernille Blume (54.19)	3:58.35	Q, NR
4	2	4	United States	Rachel Bootsma (59.70); Breeja Larson (1:06.66); Claire Donahue (58.05); Jessica Hardy (54.47)	3:58.88	Q
5	1	7	Netherlands	Sharon van Rouwendaal (1:00.98); Moniek Nijhuis (1:06.98); Inge Dekker (57.43); Femke Heemskerk (53.80)	3:59.19	Q
6	2	6	Great Britain	Gemma Spofforth (1:00.02); Siobhan-Marie O'Connor (1:08.10); Jemma Lowe (57.56); Amy Smith (53.69)	3:59.37	Q
7	1	4	China	Gao Chang (1:00.41); Sun Ye (1:08.01); Jiao Liuyang (57.56); Tang Yi (53.40)	3:59.38	Q
8	1	5	Russia	Maria Gromova (1:01.53); Yuliya Yefimova (1:05.84); Irina Bespalova (58.33); Veronika Popova (53.87)	3:59.57	Q
9	1	3	Germany	Jenny Mensing (1:01.02); Sarah Poewe (1:07.19); Alexandra Wenk (58.85); Britta Steffen (52.89)	3:59.95	
10	2	7	Sweden	Sarah Sjöström (1:01.38); Jennie Johansson (1:06.94); Martina Granström (58.46); Michelle Coleman (53.98)	4:00.76	
11	1	2	Italy	Arianna Barbieri (1:00.80); Michela Guzzetti (1:08.62); Ilaria Bianchi (57.59); Federica Pellegrini (55.19)	4:02.20	
12	1	6	Canada	Julia Wilkinson (1:00.49); Tera van Beilen (1:08.12); Katerine Savard (59.00); Samantha Cheverton (55.10)	4:02.71	
13	2	1	Spain	Duane da Rocha (1:00.43); Marina García Urzainqui (1:08.35); Judit Ignacio Sorribes (59.07); Melania Costa Schmid (55.20)	4:03.05	NR
14	1	1	France	Laure Manaudou (1:01.09); Fanny Babou (1:09.14); Justine Bruno (1:00.17); Charlotte Bonnet (55.13)	4:05.53	
15	2	8	Iceland	Eygló Ósk Gústafsdóttir (1:01.74); Hrafnhildur Lúthersdóttir (1:09.19); Sarah Blake Bateman (1:00.04); Eva Hannesdóttir (56.12)	4:07.09	
	1	8	Hungary	Evelyn Verrasztó (1:03.39); Anna Sztankovics (1:17.43); Zsuzsanna Jakabos; Eszter Dara	DSQ	

=== Final ===
Rank	Lane	Nation	Swimmers	Time	Time Behind	Notes
1st place, gold medalist(s)	6	United States	Missy Franklin (58.50); Rebecca Soni (1:04.82); Dana Vollmer (55.48); Allison Schmitt (53.25)	3:52.05		WR
2nd place, silver medalist(s)	4	Australia	Emily Seebohm (59.01); Leisel Jones (1:06.06); Alicia Coutts (56.41); Melanie Schlanger (52.54)	3:54.02	1.97	
3rd place, bronze medalist(s)	5	Japan	Aya Terakawa (58.99); Satomi Suzuki (1:05.96); Yuka Kato (57.36); Haruka Ueda (53.42)	3:55.73	3.68	NR
4	8	Russia	Anastasia Zuyeva (59.13); Yuliya Yefimova (1:04.98); Irina Bespalova (58.59); Veronika Popova (53.33)	3:56.03	3.98	NR
5	1	China	Zhao Jing (59.86); Ji Liping (1:06.94); Lu Ying (56.80); Tang Yi (52.81)	3:56.41	4.36	
6	2	Netherlands	Sharon van Rouwendaal (1:00.72); Moniek Nijhuis (1:06.74); Inge Dekker (56.91); Ranomi Kromowidjojo (52.91)	3:57.28	5.23	NR
7	3	Denmark	Mie Østergaard Nielsen (59.76); Rikke Møller Pedersen (1:06.77); Jeanette Ottesen (56.83); Pernille Blume (54.40)	3:57.76	5.71	NR
8	7	Great Britain	Gemma Spofforth (59.46); Siobhan-Marie O'Connor (1:08.45); Ellen Gandy (57.47); Francesca Halsall (54.08)	3:59.46	7.41	
