= Swimming at the 2012 Summer Olympics – Women's 200 metre butterfly =

Women's 200 metre butterfly at the Games of the XXX Olympiad
- Venue: London Aquatics Centre
- Date: July 31, 2012 (heats & semifinals); August 1, 2012 (final)
- Competitors: 28 from 21 nations
- Winning time: 2:04.06 OR

Medalists
1st place, gold medalist(s)		Jiao Liuyang	China
2nd place, silver medalist(s)		Mireia Belmonte Garcia	Spain
3rd place, bronze medalist(s)		Natsumi Hoshi	Japan

The women's 200 metre butterfly event at the 2012 Summer Olympics took place on 31 July and 1 August at the London Aquatics Centre in London, United Kingdom.

China's Jiao Liuyang stormed home on the final stretch to upgrade her silver from Beijing four years earlier with an Olympic title in the event. She produced a striking effort on the last lap to come from behind and demolish the field with a gold-medal time and a new Olympic record in 2:04.06, shaving 0.12 seconds off the standard set by teammate Liu Zige. Meanwhile, Mireia Belmonte García made an Olympic milestone to become Spain's first ever female medalist and fourth overall in swimming, as she brought home the silver in 2:05.25, the ninth-fastest of all time. Japan's Natsumi Hoshi added a sixth bronze to her swimming squad at these Games, in a sterling time of 2:05.48.

Leading through the prelims and the semifinals, U.S. swimmer Kathleen Hersey finished off the podium with a fourth-place time in 2:05.78, a full second ahead of her teammate Cammile Adams (2:06.78). Great Britain's Jemma Lowe (2:06.80), Hungary's Zsuzsanna Jakabos (2:07.33) and defending champion Liu Zige (2:07.77) rounded out the field.

Notable swimmers missed the final roster featuring Australia's Jessicah Schipper, a former world record holder; and Poland's Otylia Jędrzejczak, a 2004 Olympic champion, both of whom placed thirteenth (2:08.21) and sixteenth (2:13.09) respectively in the semifinals.

== Records ==
Prior to this competition, the existing world and Olympic records were as follows.

World record	Liu Zige (CHN)	2:01.81	Jinan, China	21 October 2009
Olympic record	Liu Zige (CHN)	2:04.18	Beijing, China	14 August 2008

The following records were established during the competition:

Date	Event	Name	Nationality	Time	Record
August 1	Final	Jiao Liuyang	China	2:04.06	OR

== Results ==
=== Heats ===
Rank	Heat	Lane	Name	Nationality	Time	Notes
1	4	6	Kathleen Hersey	United States	2:06.41	Q
2	3	4	Jiao Liuyang	China	2:07.15	Q
3	4	5	Jemma Lowe	Great Britain	2:07.64	Q
4	3	6	Katinka Hosszú	Hungary	2:07.75	Q
5	4	3	Zsuzsanna Jakabos	Hungary	2:07.79	Q
6	2	4	Natsumi Hoshi	Japan	2:08.04	Q
7	2	6	Judit Ignacio Sorribes	Spain	2:08.14	Q
8	3	3	Cammile Adams	United States	2:08.18	Q
9	2	5	Mireia Belmonte García	Spain	2:08.19	Q
10	2	7	Choi Hye-ra	South Korea	2:08.45	Q
11	4	4	Liu Zige	China	2:08.72	Q
12	2	3	Jessicah Schipper	Australia	2:08.74	Q
13	3	2	Martina Granström	Sweden	2:08.94	Q
14	4	1	Anja Klinar	Slovenia	2:09.24	Q
15	2	2	Audrey Lacroix	Canada	2:09.25	Q
16	4	2	Otylia Jędrzejczak	Poland	2:09.33	Q
17	3	5	Ellen Gandy	Great Britain	2:09.92	
18	1	5	Ingvild Snildal	Norway	2:10.99	NR
19	4	7	Katerine Savard	Canada	2:11.05	
20	3	7	Samantha Hamill	Australia	2:11.07	
21	3	8	Denisa Smolenová	Slovakia	2:11.10	
22	1	3	Andreina Pinto	Venezuela	2:11.23	NR
23	4	8	Rita Medrano	Mexico	2:11.42	
24	1	4	Sara Oliveira	Portugal	2:11.54	
25	2	1	Martina van Berkel	Switzerland	2:12.25	
26	3	1	Joanna Melo	Brazil	2:13.17	
27	2	8	Emilia Pikkarainen	Finland	2:13.81	
28	1	6	Cheng Wan-jung	Chinese Taipei	2:14.29	

=== Semifinals ===
==== Semifinal 1 ====
Rank	Lane	Name	Nationality	Time	Notes
1	4	Jiao Liuyang	China	2:06.10	Q
2	3	Natsumi Hoshi	Japan	2:06.37	Q
3	6	Cammile Adams	United States	2:07.33	Q
4	5	Katinka Hosszú	Hungary	2:07.69	
5	1	Anja Klinar	Slovenia	2:07.84	
6	7	Jessicah Schipper	Australia	2:08.21	
7	2	Choi Hye-Ra	South Korea	2:08.32	
8	8	Otylia Jędrzejczak	Poland	2:13.09	

==== Semifinal 2 ====
Rank	Lane	Name	Nationality	Time	Notes
1	4	Kathleen Hersey	United States	2:05.90	Q
2	2	Mireia Belmonte García	Spain	2:06.62	Q
3	3	Zsuzsanna Jakabos	Hungary	2:06.82	Q
4	7	Liu Zige	China	2:06.99	Q
5	5	Jemma Lowe	Great Britain	2:07.37	Q
6	1	Martina Granström	Sweden	2:07.83	NR
7	8	Audrey Lacroix	Canada	2:08.00	
8	6	Judit Ignacio Sorribes	Spain	2:08.96	

=== Final ===
Rank	Lane	Name	Nationality	Time	Notes
1st place, gold medalist(s)	5	Jiao Liuyang	China	2:04.06	OR
2nd place, silver medalist(s)	6	Mireia Belmonte García	Spain	2:05.25	NR
3rd place, bronze medalist(s)	3	Natsumi Hoshi	Japan	2:05.48	
4	4	Kathleen Hersey	United States	2:05.78	
5	1	Cammile Adams	United States	2:06.78	
6	8	Jemma Lowe	Great Britain	2:06.80	
7	2	Zsuzsanna Jakabos	Hungary	2:07.33	
8	7	Liu Zige	China	2:07.77	
