= Swimming at the 2010 Asian Games – Women's 4 × 100 metre medley relay =

Women's 4 × 100 metre medley relay at the 2010 Asian Games
- Venue: Aoti Aquatics Centre
- Date: 13 November 2010
- Competitors: 32 from 8 nations

Medalists
gold medal	China; Zhao Jing, Chen Huijia, Jiao Liuyang, Tang Yi
silver medal	Japan; Aya Terakawa, Satomi Suzuki, Yuka Kato, Haruka Ueda
bronze medal	Hong Kong; Claudia Lau, Fiona Ma, Sze Hang Yu, Hannah Wilson

The women's 4 × 100 metre medley relay event at the 2010 Asian Games took place on 13 November 2010 at Guangzhou Aoti Aquatics Centre.

There were 8 teams who took part in this event. China won the gold medal, Japan and Hong Kong won the silver and bronze medal respectively.

== Schedule ==
All times are China Standard Time (UTC+08:00)

Date	Time	Event
Saturday, 13 November 2010	19:14	Final

== Records ==
Prior to this competition, the existing world, Asian and Games records were as follows.

World Record	China	3:52.19	Rome, Italy	1 August 2009
Asian Record	China	3:52.19	Rome, Italy	1 August 2009
Games Record	China	4:00.21	Busan, South Korea	5 October 2002

== Results ==
Rank	Team	Time	Notes
1st place, gold medalist(s)	China (CHN)	3:57.80	GR
	Zhao Jing	58.94	AR
	Chen Huijia	1:07.52	
	Jiao Liuyang	57.32	
	Tang Yi	54.02	
2nd place, silver medalist(s)	Japan (JPN)	3:58.24	
	Aya Terakawa	59.57	
	Satomi Suzuki	1:06.48	
	Yuka Kato	58.37	
	Haruka Ueda	53.82	
3rd place, bronze medalist(s)	Hong Kong (HKG)	4:06.83	
	Claudia Lau	1:02.09	
	Fiona Ma	1:11.03	
	Sze Hang Yu	58.88	
	Hannah Wilson	54.83	
4	South Korea (KOR)	4:07.74	
	Lee Joo-hyung	1:03.57	
	Jeong Da-rae	1:08.20	
	Park Na-ri	1:00.17	
	Lee Jae-young	55.80	
5	Singapore (SIN)	4:15.14	
	Shana Lim	1:03.08	
	Samantha Yeo	1:12.65	
	Tao Li	1:00.35	
	Quah Ting Wen	59.06	
6	Thailand (THA)	4:22.85	
	Chavisa Thaveesupsoonthorn	1:07.57	
	Chavunnooch Salubluek	1:12.38	
	Natnapa Prommuenwai	1:03.90	
	Natthanan Junkrajang	59.00	
7	Malaysia (MAS)	4:23.57	
	Chan Kah Yan	1:06.13	
	Christina Loh	1:13.96	
	Khoo Cai Lin	1:05.34	
	Chui Lai Kwan	58.14	
8	Macau (MAC)	4:32.64	
	Erica Vong	1:10.05	
	Lei On Kei	1:13.73	
	Ma Cheok Mei	1:06.13	
	Tan Chi Yan	1:02.73	
