= Swimming at the 2010 Asian Games – Women's 4 × 200 metre freestyle relay =

Women's 4 × 200 metre freestyle relay at the 2010 Asian Games
- Venue: Aoti Aquatics Centre
- Date: 16 November 2010
- Competitors: 28 from 7 nations

Medalists
gold medal	China; Zhu Qianwei, Liu Jing, Wang Shijia, Tang Yi
silver medal	Japan; Hanae Ito, Haruka Ueda, Yayoi Matsumoto, Risa Sekine
bronze medal	South Korea; Park Na-ri, Choi Hye-ra, Lee Jae-young, Seo Youn-jeong

The women's 4 × 200 metre freestyle relay event at the 2010 Asian Games took place on 16 November 2010 at Guangzhou Aoti Aquatics Centre.

There were 7 teams who took part in this event. China won the gold medal, Japan and South Korea won the silver and bronze medal respectively.

== Schedule ==
All times are China Standard Time (UTC+08:00)

Date	Time	Event
Tuesday, 16 November 2010	19:12	Final

== Records ==
Prior to this competition, the existing world, Asian and Games records were as follows.

World Record	China	7:42.08	Rome, Italy	30 July 2009
Asian Record	China	7:42.08	Rome, Italy	30 July 2009
Games Record	China	7:58.46	Busan, South Korea	1 October 2002

== Results ==
Rank	Team	Time	Notes
1st place, gold medalist(s)	China (CHN)	7:51.81	GR
	Zhu Qianwei	1:57.04	
	Liu Jing	1:58.07	
	Wang Shijia	1:58.18	
	Tang Yi	1:58.52	
2nd place, silver medalist(s)	Japan (JPN)	7:55.92	
	Hanae Ito	1:58.37	
	Haruka Ueda	1:57.57	
	Yayoi Matsumoto	2:00.05	
	Risa Sekine	1:59.93	
3rd place, bronze medalist(s)	South Korea (KOR)	8:07.78	
	Park Na-ri	2:02.54	
	Choi Hye-ra	2:00.81	
	Lee Jae-young	2:02.82	
	Seo Youn-jeong	2:01.61	
4	Hong Kong (HKG)	8:08.11	
	Sze Hang Yu	2:00.90	
	Stephanie Au	2:02.14	
	Jennifer Town	2:04.91	
	Hannah Wilson	2:00.16	
5	Singapore (SIN)	8:16.47	
	Quah Ting Wen	2:01.10	
	Lynette Lim	2:04.53	
	Mylene Ong	2:04.56	
	Amanda Lim	2:06.28	
6	Thailand (THA)	8:18.57	
	Natthanan Junkrajang	2:02.44	
	Patarawadee Kittiya	2:05.33	
	Benjaporn Sriphanomthorn	2:05.02	
	Rutai Santadvatana	2:05.78	
7	Macau (MAC)	9:11.70	
	Ma Cheok Mei	2:14.04	
	Tan Chi Yan	2:21.25	
	Lei On Kei	2:21.67	
	Kuan Weng I	2:14.74	
