= Swimming at the 2008 Summer Olympics – Women's 4 × 100 metre medley relay =

Women's 4 × 100 metre medley relay at the Games of the XXIX Olympiad
- Venue: Beijing National Aquatics Center
- Date: August 15, 2008 (heats); August 17, 2008 (final)
- Competitors: 74 from 16 nations
- Teams: 16
- Winning time: 3:52.69 WR

Medalists
1st place, gold medalist(s)		Emily Seebohm, Leisel Jones, Jessicah Schipper, Lisbeth Trickett, Tarnee White*, Felicity Galvez*, Shayne Reese*	Australia
2nd place, silver medalist(s)		Natalie Coughlin, Rebecca Soni, Christine Magnuson, Dara Torres, Margaret Hoelzer*, Megan Jendrick*, Elaine Breeden*, Kara Lynn Joyce*	United States
3rd place, bronze medalist(s)		Zhao Jing, Sun Ye, Zhou Yafei, Pang Jiaying, Xu Tianlongzi* *Indicates the swimmer only competed in the preliminary heats.	China

The women's 4 × 100 metre medley relay event at the 2008 Olympic Games took place on 15 and 17 August at the Beijing National Aquatics Center in Beijing, China.

Dominating the race from the start, the Aussie women's relay team solidified their triumph to destroy the world record and to defend the Olympic title over their American rivals for the second straight time. The foursome of Emily Seebohm (59.33), Leisel Jones (1:04.58), Jessicah Schipper (56.25), and Lisbeth Trickett (52.53) put together a ending with a time of 3:52.69 to shave three seconds off their standard from the 2007 FINA World Championships in Melbourne.

Team USA's Natalie Coughlin (58.94), Rebecca Soni (1:05.95), Christine Magnuson (56.14), and legend Dara Torres (52.27) trailed behind their greatest rivals in the pool by six-tenths of a second (0.60), but finished under a world-record time to take home a silver in a new American standard of 3:53.30. Competing in her fifth Olympics since 1984, at age 41, Torres also picked up her twelfth career medal to match Jenny Thompson's record as the most successful American woman in Olympic history. Delighted by a raucous home crowd inside the Water Cube, the Chinese quartet of Zhao Jing (59.56), Sun Ye (1:06.75), Zhou Yafei (57.40), and Pang Jiaying (52.40) ended with a bronze medal in an Asian record of 3:56.11.

Great Britain's Gemma Spofforth (59.05), Kate Haywood (1:07.51), Jemma Lowe (58.13), and Francesca Halsall (52.81) missed the podium by over a single second, but powered home with a fourth-place effort in a European record of 3:57.50, holding off the Russian foursome of Anastasia Zuyeva (59.16), Yuliya Yefimova (1:06.46), Natalya Sutyagina (58.09), and Anastasia Aksenova (54.13) by 0.34 seconds, a fifth-place time of 3:57.84. Japan's Reiko Nakamura (59.74), Asami Kitagawa (1:07.04), Yuka Kato (58.17), and Haruka Ueda (54.59) cleared a four-minute barrier to claim a sixth spot in 3:59.54, leaving Canada's Julia Wilkinson (1:01.35), Annamay Pierse (1:06.91), Audrey Lacroix (59.01), and Erica Morningstar (54.08) out of the fence in 4:01.35. As the entire field came to a finish in the pool, Sweden was disqualified from the race because of an early relay takeoff on the final exchange by freestyle anchor Josefin Lillhage.

== Records ==
Prior to this competition, the existing world and Olympic records were as follows.

World record	Australia (AUS); Emily Seebohm (1:00.79); Leisel Jones (1:04.94); Jessicah Schipper (57.18); Lisbeth Lenton (52.83)	3:55.74	Melbourne, Australia	31 March 2007	
Olympic record	Australia; Giaan Rooney (1:01.18); Leisel Jones (1:06.50); Petria Thomas (56.67); Jodie Henry (52.97)	3:57.32	Athens, Greece	21 August 2004	-

The following new world and Olympic records were set during this competition.

Date	Event	Name	Nationality	Time	Record
August 17	Final	Emily Seebohm (59.33); Leisel Jones (1:04.58); Jessicah Schipper (56.25); Lisbeth Trickett (52.53)	Australia	3:52.69	WR

== Results ==
=== Heats ===
Rank	Heat	Lane	Nationality	Name	Time	Notes
1	2	4	Australia	Emily Seebohm (59.95); Tarnee White (1:06.81); Felicity Galvez (56.82); Shayne Reese (54.36)	3:57.94	Q
2	2	5	Great Britain	Gemma Spofforth (1:00.33); Kate Haywood (1:08.00); Jemma Lowe (57.34); Francesca Halsall (53.47)	3:59.14	Q, ER
3	1	4	United States	Margaret Hoelzer (59.29); Megan Jendrick (1:07.17); Elaine Breeden (58.59); Kara Lynn Joyce (54.10)	3:59.15	Q
4	1	5	China	Xu Tianlongzi (1:01.13); Sun Ye (1:06.85); Zhou Yafei (56.94); Pang Jiaying (54.29)	3:59.21	Q, AS
5	2	3	Russia	Kseniya Moskvina (1:01.05); Yuliya Yefimova (1:06.45); Natalya Sutyagina (58.31); Anastasia Aksenova (53.85)	3:59.66	Q, NR
6	1	3	Japan	Hanae Ito (1:00.34); Asami Kitagawa (1:07.33); Yuka Kato (57.69); Haruka Ueda (54.55)	3:59.91	Q, NR
7	2	7	Sweden	Sarah Sjöström (1:02.48); Joline Höstman (1:08.48); Anna-Karin Kammerling (57.57); Josefin Lillhage (53.59)	4:02.12	Q, NR
8	2	2	Canada	Julia Wilkinson (1:00.90); Annamay Pierse (1:07.22); Audrey Lacroix (59.84); Erica Morningstar (54.17)	4:02.13	Q, NR
9	1	8	Germany	Antje Buschschulte (1:00.51); Sarah Poewe (1:08.95); Daniela Samulski (59.78); Britta Steffen (53.29)	4:02.53	
10	1	2	Brazil	Fabíola Molina (1:00.71); Tatiane Sakemi (1:10.42); Gabriella Silva (56.97); Tatiana Barbosa (54.51)	4:02.61	NR
11	1	1	France	Alexianne Castel (1:01.28); Sophie de Ronchi (1:08.75); Aurore Mongel (58.64); Alena Popchanka (54.28)	4:02.95	NR
12	2	6	South Africa	Melissa Corfe (1:02.62); Suzaan van Biljon (1:07.90); Mandy Loots (58.76); Lize-Mari Retief (54.92)	4:04.20	
13	1	6	Netherlands	Femke Heemskerk (1:02.97); Jolijn van Valkengoed (1:10.85); Inge Dekker (57.41); Ranomi Kromowidjojo (53.51)	4:04.74	
14	2	8	Italy	Romina Armellini (1:02.49); Roberta Panara (1:08.36); Ilaria Bianchi (58.09); Federica Pellegrini (55.99)	4:04.93	
15	1	7	Spain	Nina Zhivanevskaya (1:00.77); Mireia Belmonte García (1:10.46); Angela San Juan (1:00.08); María Fuster (55.09)	4:06.40	
16	2	1	Ukraine	Iryna Amshennikova (1:03.63); Yuliya Pidlisna (1:09.53); Kateryna Zubkova (59.65); Darya Stepanyuk (55.81)	4:08.62	

=== Final ===
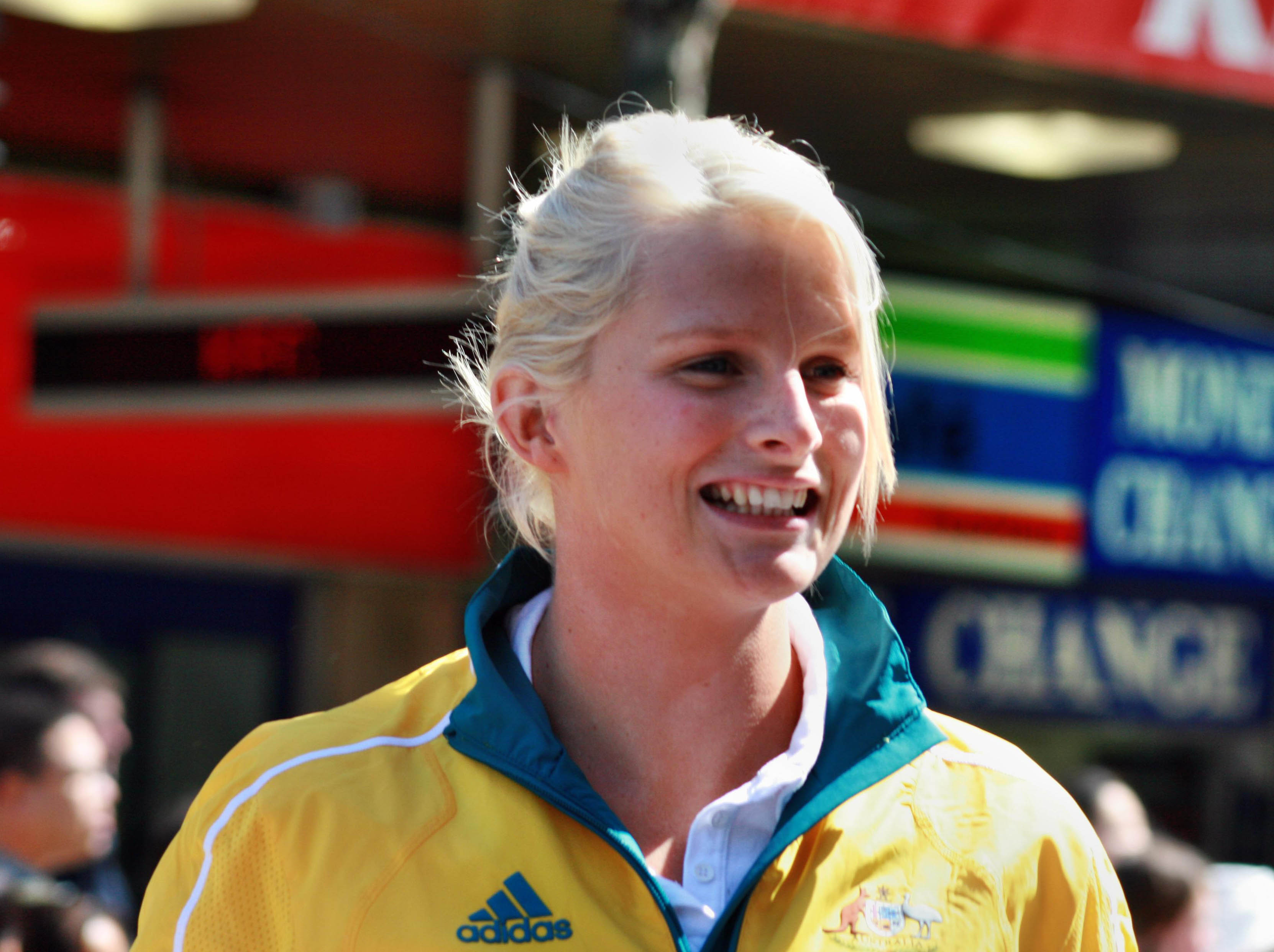
Leisel Jones' breaststroke split was the fastest in the race by 1.37 seconds and gave Australia a decisive lead.

Rank	Lane	Nationality	Name	Time	Time behind	Notes
1st place, gold medalist(s)	4	Australia	Emily Seebohm (59.33) OC; Leisel Jones (1:04.58); Jessicah Schipper (56.25); Lisbeth Trickett (52.53)	3:52.69		WR
2nd place, silver medalist(s)	3	United States	Natalie Coughlin (58.94) AM; Rebecca Soni (1:05.95); Christine Magnuson (56.14); Dara Torres (52.27)	3:53.30	0.61	AM
3rd place, bronze medalist(s)	6	China	Zhao Jing (59.56); Sun Ye (1:06.75); Zhou Yafei (57.40); Pang Jiaying (52.40)	3:56.11	3.42	AS
4	5	Great Britain	Gemma Spofforth (59.05) NR; Kate Haywood (1:07.51); Jemma Lowe (58.13); Francesca Halsall (52.81)	3:57.50	4.81	ER
5	2	Russia	Anastasia Zuyeva (59.16) NR; Yuliya Yefimova (1:06.46); Natalya Sutyagina (58.09); Anastasia Aksenova (54.13)	3:57.84	5.15	NR
6	7	Japan	Reiko Nakamura (59.74); Asami Kitagawa (1:07.04); Yuka Kato (58.17); Haruka Ueda (54.59)	3:59.54	6.85	NR
7	8	Canada	Julia Wilkinson (1:01.35); Annamay Pierse (1:06.91); Audrey Lacroix (59.01); Erica Morningstar (54.08)	4:01.35	8.66	NR
	1	Sweden	Sarah Sjöström (1:02.63); Joline Höstman (1:08.11); Anna-Karin Kammerling (58.51); Josefin Lillhage	DSQ		
