= Swimming at the 2010 Asian Games – Women's 200 metre butterfly =

Women's 200 metre butterfly at the 2010 Asian Games
- Venue: Aoti Aquatics Centre
- Date: 15 November 2010
- Competitors: 13 from 9 nations

Medalists
gold medal	Jiao Liuyang	China
silver medal	Natsumi Hoshi	Japan
bronze medal	Choi Hye-ra	South Korea

The women's 200 metre butterfly event at the 2010 Asian Games took place on 15 November 2010 at Guangzhou Aoti Aquatics Centre.

There were 13 competitors from 9 countries who took part in this event. Two heats were held, the heat in which a swimmer competed did not formally matter for advancement, as the swimmers with the top eight times from the both field qualified for the finals.

Jiao Liuyang from China won the gold medal, Natsumi Hoshi from Japan won the silver medal, South Korean swimmer Choi Hye-ra finished with third place.

== Schedule ==
All times are China Standard Time (UTC+08:00)

Date	Time	Event
Monday, 15 November 2010	09:57	Heats
Monday, 15 November 2010	18:57	Final

== Records ==
Prior to this competition, the existing world, Asian and Games records were as follows.

World Record	Liu Zige (CHN)	2:01.81	Jinan, China	21 October 2009
Asian Record	Liu Zige (CHN)	2:01.81	Jinan, China	21 October 2009
Games Record	Liu Limin (CHN)	2:06.77	Hiroshima, Japan	8 October 1994

== Results ==
=== Heats ===
Rank	Heat	Athlete	Time	Notes
1	2	Jiao Liuyang (CHN)	2:09.16	
2	1	Natsumi Hoshi (JPN)	2:09.94	
3	2	Zhu Jiani (CHN)	2:11.11	
4	2	Choi Hye-ra (KOR)	2:11.40	
5	1	Cheng Wan-jung (TPE)	2:13.09	
6	1	Yuka Kato (JPN)	2:13.79	
7	1	Park Na-ri (KOR)	2:14.24	
8	2	Patarawadee Kittiya (THA)	2:15.39	
9	2	Erica Totten (PHI)	2:16.54	
10	2	Elmira Aigaliyeva (KAZ)	2:17.74	
11	2	Carmen Nam (HKG)	2:18.48	
12	1	Jennifer Town (HKG)	2:20.97	
13	1	Nguyễn Thị Kim Tuyến (VIE)	2:33.61	

=== Final ===
Rank	Athlete	Time	Notes
1st place, gold medalist(s)	Jiao Liuyang (CHN)	2:05.79	GR
2nd place, silver medalist(s)	Natsumi Hoshi (JPN)	2:07.96	
3rd place, bronze medalist(s)	Choi Hye-ra (KOR)	2:08.39	
4	Yuka Kato (JPN)	2:09.82	
5	Cheng Wan-jung (TPE)	2:11.84	
6	Zhu Jiani (CHN)	2:11.94	
7	Park Na-ri (KOR)	2:12.42	
8	Patarawadee Kittiya (THA)	2:15.40	
