= Swimming at the 2006 Asian Games – Women's 200 metre butterfly =

Women's 200 metre butterfly at the 2006 Asian Games
- Venue: Hamad Aquatic Centre
- Date: 4 December 2006
- Competitors: 15 from 11 nations

Medalists
gold medal	Yurie Yano	Japan
silver medal	Choi Hye-ra	South Korea
bronze medal	Yuko Nakanishi	Japan

The women's 200m butterfly swimming event at the 2006 Asian Games was held on December 4, 2006 at the Hamad Aquatic Centre in Doha, Qatar.

== Schedule ==
All times are Arabia Standard Time (UTC+03:00)

Date	Time	Event
Monday, 4 December 2006	10:53	Heats
Monday, 4 December 2006	18:43	Final

== Records ==
Prior to this competition, the existing world, Asian and Games records were as follows.

World Record	Jessicah Schipper (AUS)	2:05.40	Victoria, Canada	17 August 2006
Asian Record	Yuko Nakanishi (JPN)	2:06.52	Victoria, Canada	17 August 2006
Games Record	Liu Limin (CHN)	2:06.77	Hiroshima, Japan	8 October 1994

== Results ==
=== Heats ===
Rank	Heat	Athlete	Time	Notes
1	1	Choi Hye-ra (KOR)	2:11.09	
2	2	Jiao Liuyang (CHN)	2:11.54	
3	1	Kwon You-ri (KOR)	2:11.75	
4	2	Yuko Nakanishi (JPN)	2:12.26	
5	1	Yurie Yano (JPN)	2:12.55	
6	2	Deng Biying (CHN)	2:12.83	
7	2	Carmen Nam (HKG)	2:19.37	
8	2	Quah Ting Wen (SIN)	2:20.52	
9	1	Marichi Gandionco (PHI)	2:22.70	
10	2	Erica Totten (PHI)	2:24.89	
11	1	Natnapa Prommuenwai (THA)	2:29.10	
12	1	Maftunabonu Tukhtasinova (UZB)	2:31.58	
13	2	Lam Sin I (MAC)	2:34.27	
14	1	Miniruwani Samarakoon (SRI)	2:40.71	
15	2	Ameena Fakhro (QAT)	2:51.29	

=== Final ===
Rank	Athlete	Time	Notes
1st place, gold medalist(s)	Yurie Yano (JPN)	2:09.08	
2nd place, silver medalist(s)	Choi Hye-ra (KOR)	2:09.64	
3rd place, bronze medalist(s)	Yuko Nakanishi (JPN)	2:09.75	
4	Kwon You-ri (KOR)	2:10.53	
5	Jiao Liuyang (CHN)	2:10.92	
6	Deng Biying (CHN)	2:11.45	
7	Carmen Nam (HKG)	2:19.94	
8	Quah Ting Wen (SIN)	2:21.27	
