= Kwon You-ri =

South Korean swimmer (born 1989)

Personal information
- Full name: Kwon You-ri
- National team: South Korea
- Born: 30 July 1989 (age 36) Seoul, South Korea
- Height: 1.67 m (5 ft 6 in)
- Weight: 54 kg (119 lb)

Korean name
- Hangul: 권유리
- RR: Gwon Yuri
- MR: Kwŏn Yuri

Sport
- Sport: Swimming
- Strokes: Freestyle, butterfly

Kwon You-ri (Korean: 권유리; born July 30, 1989) is a South Korean swimmer, who specialized in long-distance freestyle and butterfly events. She is a fourth-place finalist in the 200 m butterfly at the 2006 Asian Games in Doha, Qatar.

Kwon qualified for two swimming events, as South Korea's youngest female swimmer (aged 15), at the 2004 Summer Olympics in Athens. She eclipsed FINA B-standard entry times of 8:56.56 (800 m freestyle) and 2:11.59 (200 m butterfly) from the Dong-A Swimming Tournament in Seoul. In the 200 m butterfly, Kwon challenged seven other swimmers on the second heat, including top medal favorite Éva Risztov of Hungary. She rounded out the field to last place and twenty-fourth overall by a 3.81-second margin behind Risztov in 2:14.30. In her second event, 800 m freestyle, Kwon placed twenty-second overall on the morning prelims. Swimming in heat one, she edged out fellow 15-year-old Jelena Petrova of Estonia to pick up a second seed by two tenths of a second (0.20) with a time of 9:01.42.
