= Elaine Breeden =

American swimmer

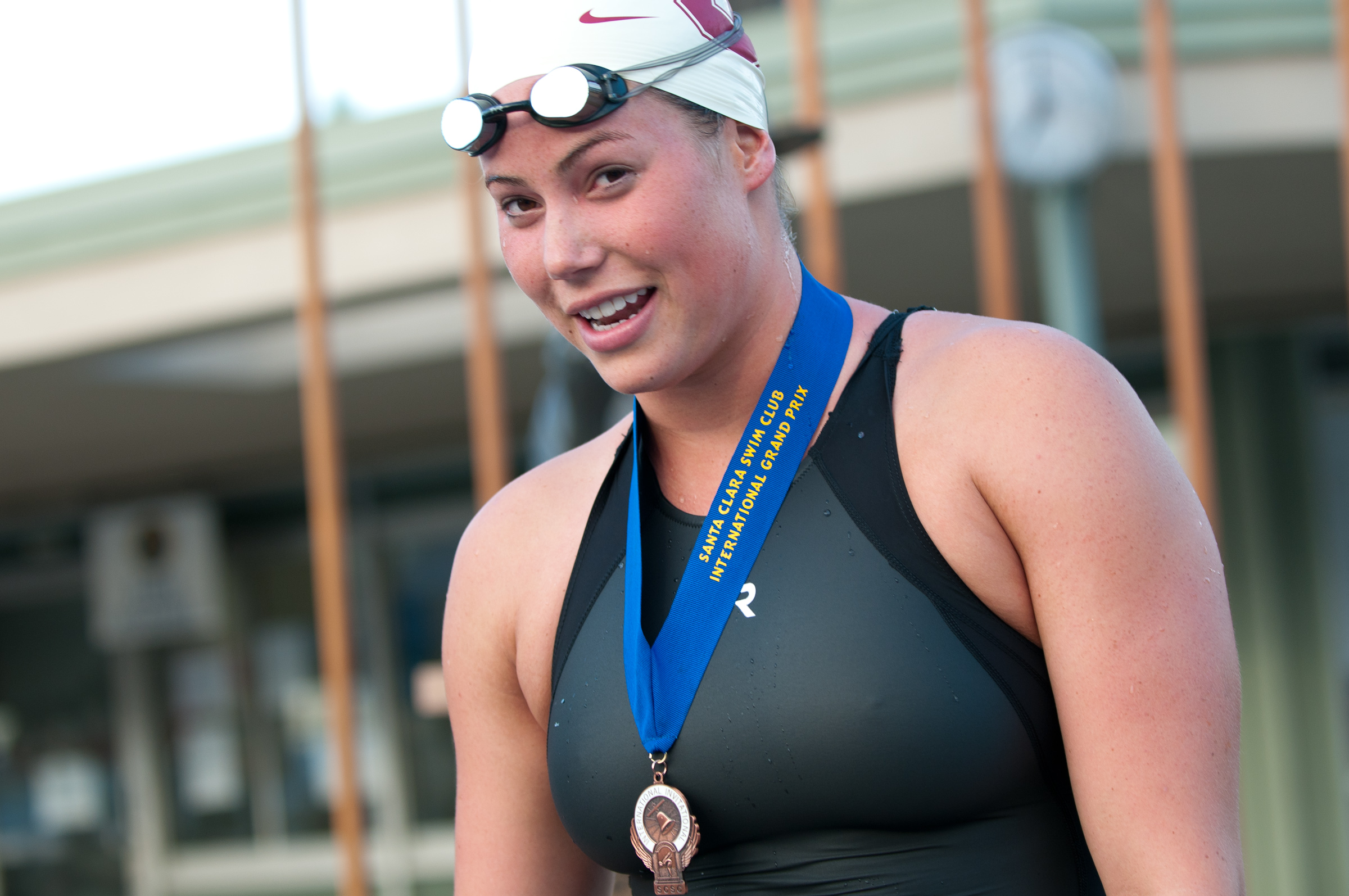

Personal information
- Full name: Elaine Sawyer Breeden Penrose
- National team: United States
- Born: November 18, 1988 (age 37) Lexington, Kentucky, U.S.
- Height: 5 ft 11 in (180 cm)
- Weight: 161 lb (73 kg)
- Spouse: Colin Penrose
- Children: 2

Sport
- Sport: Swimming
- Strokes: Butterfly
- Club: Wildcat Aquatics; Stanford Swimming
- College team: Stanford University
- Coach: J. Broccato (Wildcat Aquat.); Lea & Erik Maurer (Stanford U.)
Medal record
Women's swimming
Representing the United States
Olympic Games
| Silver medal – second place | 2008 Beijing | 4×100 m medley |
World Championships (SC)
| Silver medal – second place | 2006 Shanghai | 4x100 m medley |
Pan American Games
| Gold medal – first place | 2011 Guadalajara | 4×100 m medley |
| Bronze medal – third place | 2011 Guadalajara | 100 m butterfly |
Summer Universiade
| Silver medal – second place | 2007 Bangkok | 4x100 m medley |

Elaine Breeden Penrose (born November 18, 1988), née Elaine Breeden, is a former American competition swimmer for Stanford University and a 2008 Olympic silver medalist.

Born November 18, 1988, in Lexington, Kentucky, Breeden broke her first age-group record at 8, and soon held a number No. 1 national rank in the 50-meter butterfly in the 10-and-under, and 12-and-under age groups. By the age of 11, she was coached by John Brucato who soon recognized her potential. In High School, she attended Lexington's Trinity Christian Academy and swam for the Wildcat Aquatics Swim Club. As she developed, she continued to train at the Lancaster Aquatic Club with Wildcat Aquatics primarily under Coach John Brucato, who later served as an Assistant Coach at the University of Kentucky.

At the Southern Zone Eastern Championships in Nashville in March 2006, she compiled the highest point total of any swimmer, finishing first in the 100-meter butterfly, the 200-meter butterfly and the 200-meter individual medley. Her time of 52.65 in the 100-meter butterfly broke the State record for 17-18 year olds set decades earlier by fellow Kentuckian Mary T. Meagher of Louisville. By 2006, she had set USA swimming National Meet qualifying times in every stroke, a rare and distinctive achievement.

In 2006, she was the youngest member of the U.S. Swimming Women's team at the Short Course World Championships in Shanghai, China. The team was coached by Louisvillian Mike DeBoor, of Lakeside Swimming Club, and featured another Kentucky swimmer, Rachel Komisarz, a silver and bronze medalist at the meet.

== 2008 Beijing Olympics ==
Swimming as a High School Senior at the 2008 U.S. Swimming Trials at the Qwest Center in Omaha, Nebraska, she unexpectedly qualified for the Women's Olympic team by placing second in the 100-meter butterfly with a time of :58.21, upsetting event favorite, University of Kentucky graduate Rachel Komisarz who took third. Breeden touched the wall only a tenth of a second behind first place Christine Magnuson. Breeden also qualified to compete in the 200-meter butterfly event by placing first at the trials.

At the 2008 Olympics in Beijing, China, she advanced to the semifinals of the women's 100-meter butterfly, and finished seventh in the final of the women's 200-meter butterfly. She earned a silver medal by swimming for the second-place U.S. team in the preliminary heats of the women's 4×100-meter medley relay.

=== Stanford University ===
Breeden attended Stanford University, under the direction of Stanford coaches, Lea and Erik Maurer from 2007 to 2010. As a college swimmer, she was a three-time NCAA national champion in the 200-yard butterfly (2007, 2009, 2010), as well as the NCAA champion in the 100-yard butterfly (2010). She received a total of 24 All-American honors. In her last year on the women's swim team, she led Stanford to an NCAA runner-up finish in 2010. By the end of her time at Stanford, she was a seven-time Pac-10 champion.

In 2009, Breeden broke the American, U.S. Open, and NCAA records in the 200-yard fly with a time of 1:49.92. Her time was the first under 1:50 and stood as the American record for nearly a decade.

=== International competition ===
In one of her best performances, she won a gold medal swimming in the preliminary heats of the 4×100-meter medley relay at the 2011 Summer Pan American Games in Guadalajara and an individual bronze in the 100-meter butterfly.

She won a silver medal in the preliminary heats of the 4 × 100 m medley relay at the 2006 World Short-Course Swimming Championships in Shanghai. She won another silver medal in the 4×100-meter medley relay at the 2007 Summer Universiade in Bangkok.

After her attempt to make the Olympic team in 2012, she retired from competitive swimming.

=== Later life ===
She married Colin Thomas Penrose in September 2012, and became a full-time mother of two daughters. Her husband Colin has worked as an orthopedic surgeon in Indianapolis and Bloomington, Indiana for the Midwest Center for Joint Replacement.

=== Honors ===
On September 9, 2022, she was inducted into Stanford University's Hall of Fame.

She was a Honda Award Finalist for academic excellence and was a first team Academic All-American and Academic All-District VIII at Stanford.

== See also ==
- List of Olympic medalists in swimming (women)
- List of Stanford University people
