= Swimming at the 2014 Asian Games – Women's 200 metre butterfly =

Women's 200 metre butterfly at the 2014 Asian Games
- Venue: Munhak Park Tae-hwan Aquatics Center
- Date: 24 September 2014
- Competitors: 9 from 5 nations

Medalists
gold medal	Jiao Liuyang	China
silver medal	Natsumi Hoshi	Japan
bronze medal	Miyu Nakano	Japan

The women's 200 metre butterfly event at the 2014 Asian Games took place on 24 September 2014 at Munhak Park Tae-hwan Aquatics Center.

== Schedule ==
All times are Korea Standard Time (UTC+09:00)

Date	Time	Event
Wednesday, 24 September 2014	09:00	Heats
Wednesday, 24 September 2014	19:40	Final

== Records ==
Prior to this competition, the existing world, Asian and Games records were as follows.

World Record	Liu Zige (CHN)	2:01.81	Jinan, China	21 October 2009
Asian Record	Liu Zige (CHN)	2:01.81	Jinan, China	21 October 2009
Games Record	Jiao Liuyang (CHN)	2:05.79	Guangzhou, China	15 November 2010

== Results ==
=== Heats ===
Rank	Heat	Athlete	Time	Notes
1	2	Natsumi Hoshi (JPN)	2:13.64	
2	2	Miyu Nakano (JPN)	2:13.87	
3	1	Jiao Liuyang (CHN)	2:13.95	
4	2	Liu Zige (CHN)	2:14.38	
5	2	Quah Ting Wen (SIN)	2:15.24	
6	1	An Se-hyeon (KOR)	2:17.11	
7	2	Patarawadee Kittiya (THA)	2:17.96	
8	1	Sutasinee Pankaew (THA)	2:19.18	
9	1	Tan Jing E (SIN)	2:21.31	

=== Final ===
Rank	Athlete	Time	Notes
1st place, gold medalist(s)	Jiao Liuyang (CHN)	2:07.56	
2nd place, silver medalist(s)	Natsumi Hoshi (JPN)	2:08.04	
3rd place, bronze medalist(s)	Miyu Nakano (JPN)	2:09.18	
4	Liu Zige (CHN)	2:10.01	
5	An Se-hyeon (KOR)	2:10.14	
6	Quah Ting Wen (SIN)	2:14.26	
7	Patarawadee Kittiya (THA)	2:18.19	
8	Sutasinee Pankaew (THA)	2:18.96	
