= Tetyana Khala =

Ukrainian swimmer (born 1987)

Personal information
- Full name: Tetyana Valentynivna Khala
- National team: Ukraine
- Born: 6 May 1987 (age 39) Dnipropetrovsk, Ukrainian SSR, Soviet Union
- Height: 1.76 m (5 ft 9 in)
- Weight: 62 kg (137 lb)

Sport
- Sport: Swimming
- Strokes: Butterfly
- Club: Spartak Dnipropetrovsk

Tetyana Valentynivna Khala (Ukrainian: Тетяна Валентинівна Хала; born May 6, 1987) is a Ukrainian swimmer, who specialized in butterfly events. She represented her nation Ukraine at the 2008 Summer Olympics, finishing in the top 30 of the women's 200 m butterfly.

Khala competed as a lone swimmer for the Ukrainian team in the women's 200 m butterfly at the 2008 Summer Olympics in Beijing. Leading up to the Games, she cleared a FINA B-standard entry time of 2:13.59 at the European Championships in Eindhoven, Netherlands. She challenged six other swimmers on the second heat including Singapore's Tao Li, who finished fifth in the 100 m butterfly final. She edged out Tao to take the fourth spot by 0.47 of a second in 2:12.16. Khala failed to advance into the semifinals, as she placed twenty-fourth overall in the prelims.
