= Swimming at the 2010 Commonwealth Games – Women's 100 metre butterfly =

The Women's 100 metre butterfly event at the 2010 Commonwealth Games took place on 6 and 7 October 2010, at the SPM Swimming Pool Complex.

Four heats were held, with most containing the maximum number of swimmers (eight). The top sixteen times qualified for the semi-finals and, the top eight from there qualified for the finals.

== Heats ==
=== Heat 1 ===
Rank	Lane	Name	Nationality	Time	Notes
1	5	Shubha Chittaranjan	India	1:06.84	
2	3	Jessica Stagno	Mozambique	1:14.36	
3	4	Anham Salyani	Kenya	1:19.15	

=== Heat 2 ===
Rank	Lane	Name	Nationality	Time	Notes
1	5	Jemma Lowe	Wales	58.91	Q
2	4	Felicity Galvez	Australia	59.28	Q
3	6	Jessica Sylvester	England	1:00.31	Q
4	3	Alys Thomas	Wales	1:01.16	Q
5	2	Pooja Alva	India	1:04.53	Q
6	7	Alexia Royal-Eatmon	Jamaica	1:09.78	
7	1	Ajaykumar Hanika	Kenya	1:17.17	

=== Heat 3 ===
Rank	Lane	Name	Nationality	Time	Notes
1	3	Audrey Lacroix	Canada	58.96	Q
2	4	Alicia Coutts	Australia	59.49	Q
3	5	Ellen Gandy	England	59.63	Q
4	6	Natalie Wiegersma	New Zealand	1:01.17	Q
5	7	Sian Morgan	Wales	1:05.00	Q
6	1	Judith Meauri	Papua New Guinea	1:16.69	
–	2	Anna Schegoleva	Cyprus		DNS

=== Heat 4 ===
Rank	Lane	Name	Nationality	Time	Notes
1	3	Katerine Savard	Canada	59.41	Q
2	6	MacKenzie Dowell	Canada	1:00.14	Q
3	4	Francesca Halsall	England	1:00.26	Q
4	2	Louise Pate	Scotland	1:00.64	Q
5	6	Yolane Kukla	Australia	1:00.66	Q
6	7	Bethany Carson	Northern Ireland	1:04.11	Q
7	1	Shannon Austin	Seychelles	1:09.59	
–	8	Sylvia Brunlehner	Kenya		DNS

== Semifinals ==
=== Semifinal 1 ===
Rank	Lane	Name	Nationality	Time	Notes
1	3	Ellen Gandy	England	58.24	Q
2	4	Audrey Lacroix	Canada	59.09	Q
3	5	Katerine Savard	Canada	59.46	Q
4	6	Francesca Halsall	England	59.84	
5	2	Louise Pate	Scotland	1:00.83	
6	7	Alys Thomas	Wales	1:01.03	
7	1	Bethany Carson	Northern Ireland	1:03.13	
8	8	Sian Morgan	Wales	1:04.42	

=== Semifinal 2 ===
Rank	Lane	Name	Nationality	Time	Notes
1	4	Jemma Lowe	Wales	58.44	Q
2	3	Alicia Coutts	Australia	58.46	Q
3	5	Felicity Galvez	Australia	58.61	Q
4	7	Yolane Kukla	Australia	59.14	Q
5	2	Jessica Sylvester	England	59.33	Q
6	6	MacKenzie Downing	Canada	59.57	
7	1	Natalie Wiegersma	New Zealand	1:00.08	
8	8	Pooja Alva	India	1:04.93	

== Final ==
Rank	Lane	Name	Nationality	Time	Notes
1st place, gold medalist(s)	3	Alicia Coutts	Australia	57.53	
2nd place, silver medalist(s)	4	Ellen Gandy	England	58.06	
3rd place, bronze medalist(s)	5	Jemma Lowe	Wales	58.42	
4	7	Yolane Kukla	Australia	58.47	
5	6	Felicity Galvez	Australia	58.83	
6	2	Audrey Lacroix	Canada	59.22	
7	1	Jessica Sylvester	England	59.40	
8	8	Katerine Savard	Canada	59.91	
