= Natalia Hadjiloizou =

Cypriot swimmer (born 1979)

Medal record

Representing Belarus

Women's swimming

World Championships - Short Course
Bronze medal – third place	2000 Athens	200 m freestyle

European Championships (LC)
Gold medal – first place	Helsinki 2000	200 m freestyle
Silver medal – second place	Helsinki 2000	400 m freestyle
Bronze medal – third place	Istanbul 1999	200 m freestyle

European Championships (SC)
Silver medal – second place	1999 Lisbon	400 m freestyle
Bronze medal – third place	1999 Lisbon	200 m freestyle

Natalia Hadjiloizou (Greek: Ναταλία Χατζηλοΐζου; born 23 March 1979 in Vitebsk, Belarus as Natalya Baranovskaya; Belarusian: Наталля Бараноўская, romanized: Natallya Baranowskaya; Russian: Наталья Барановская) is a professional Cypriot swimmer.

== Swimming career ==
She made her Olympic debut at the 1996 Summer Olympics in Atlanta for Belarus.

Hadjiloizou also competed in the 2000 Summer Olympics in Sydney for Belarus, where she placed 6th in the 200 m freestyle and did not advance out of the preliminary heats in the 400 m freestyle.

She won the 'Open' 1999 British Championship in the 400 metres freestyle.

After deciding to retire aged 22 in 2001, she moved to Cyprus where she married her coach Giorgios, and later competed for Cyprus at the 2008 Summer Olympics where she ranked 45th in the 100 metre butterfly event.
