= Lu Ying =

Chinese swimmer (born 1989)

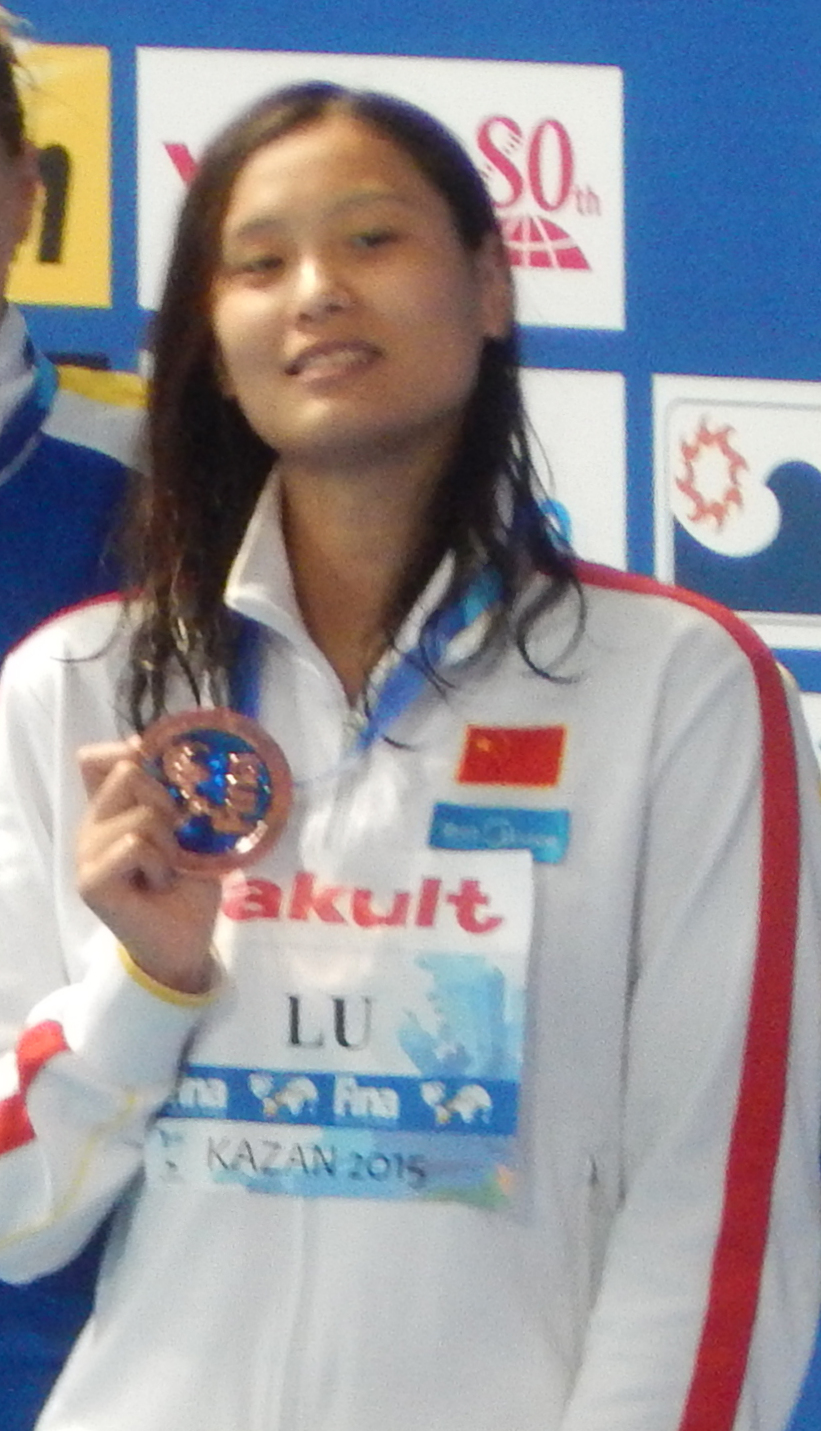
- Lu at the 2015 World Championships

Personal information
- Full name: Lu Ying
- National team: China
- Born: 22 January 1989 (age 37) Shanghai, China
- Height: 1.75 m (5 ft 9 in)
- Weight: 62 kg (137 lb)

Sport
- Sport: Swimming
- Strokes: Butterfly
Medal record
Women's lifesaving
Representing China
World Games
Gold medal – first place	2009 Kaohsiung	200 m obstacle swim
Women's swimming
Representing China
Olympic Games
Silver medal – second place	2012 London	100 m butterfly
World Championships (LC)
Gold medal – first place	2015 Kazan	4×100 m medley
Silver medal – second place	2011 Shanghai	4×100 m medley
Silver medal – second place	2013 Barcelona	50 m butterfly
Bronze medal – third place	2011 Shanghai	100 m butterfly
Bronze medal – third place	2015 Kazan	50 m butterfly
Bronze medal – third place	2015 Kazan	100 m butterfly
World Championships (SC)
Gold medal – first place	2012 Istanbul	50 m butterfly
Silver medal – second place	2014 Doha	100 m butterfly
Pan Pacific Championships
Silver medal – second place	2014 Gold Coast	100 m butterfly
Asian Games
Bronze medal – third place	2010 Guangzhou	50 m butterfly
Summer Universiade
Gold medal – first place	2011 Shenzhen	50 m butterfly
Gold medal – first place	2011 Shenzhen	100 m butterfly
Gold medal – first place	2011 Shenzhen	4×100 m medley
Gold medal – first place	2015 Gwangju	50 m butterfly
Gold medal – first place	2015 Gwangju	100 m butterfly
Bronze medal – third place	2011 Shenzhen	4×100 m freestyle
Bronze medal – third place	2011 Shenzhen	4×200 m freestyle

Lu Ying (陆滢, Lù Yíng, born 22 January 1989) is a Chinese competitive swimmer. She competed for China at the 2012 Summer Olympics in London and the 2016 Olympics in Rio. She won a silver medal in the women's 100 metre butterfly at the 2012 Summer Olympics.
