= Denisa Smolenová =

Slovak swimmer

Personal information
- Born: February 14, 1989 (age 37) Bratislava, Czechoslovakia

Sport
- Sport: Swimming
- Strokes: Butterfly

Denisa Smolenová (born 14 February 1989) is a Slovak swimmer who competes in the women's butterfly. At the 2012 Summer Olympics she finished 28th overall in the heats in the women's 100 metre butterfly and failed to reach the final. She also competed in the 200 m butterfly, again not making the final. She had previously competed in the 200 m butterfly at the 2008 Summer Olympics.
