= Jemma Lowe =

British swimmer (born 1990)

Personal information
- Full name: Jemma Louise Lowe
- National team: Great Britain
- Born: 31 March 1990 (age 36) Hartlepool, England
- Height: 1.71 m (5 ft 7 1/2 in)
- Weight: 59 kg (130 lb)

Sport
- Sport: Swimming
- Strokes: Butterfly, Individual medley
- Club: Swansea Intensive Training Centre
- College team: University of Florida (US)
Medal record
Women's swimming
Representing Great Britain
World Championships (SC)
Silver medal – second place	2010 Dubai	200 butterfly
Bronze medal – third place	2008 Manchester	100 butterfly
Bronze medal – third place	2008 Manchester	4×100 medley
Bronze medal – third place	2012 Istanbul	100 butterfly
Bronze medal – third place	2012 Istanbul	200 butterfly
European Championships (LC)
Gold medal – first place	2008 Eindhoven	4×100 medley
Gold medal – first place	2014 Berlin	4x100 mix medley
Bronze medal – third place	2014 Berlin	4x100 medley
European Championships (SC)
Silver medal – second place	2011 Szczecin	100 butterfly
Silver medal – second place	2011 Szczecin	200 butterfly
Silver medal – second place	2013 Herning	100 butterfly
Bronze medal – third place	2008 Rijeka	200 butterfly
Bronze medal – third place	2013 Herning	200 butterfly
Representing Wales
Commonwealth Games
Bronze medal – third place	2010 Delhi	100 butterfly

Jemma Louise Lowe (born 31 March 1990) is a former British international butterfly swimmer and British record holder. She has competed for Wales in the Commonwealth Games, and was a member of Great Britain's 2008 and 2012 Olympic teams.

== Career history ==
Lowe was born in Hartlepool, England, United Kingdom. Educated in Hartlepool, she attended High Tunstall College of Science followed by English Martyrs School and Sixth Form College.

She accepted an athletic scholarship to attend the University of Florida in Gainesville, Florida, United States, where she swam for coach Gregg Troy's Florida Gators swimming and diving team in National Collegiate Athletic Association (NCAA) competition in 2009 and 2010. She won three Southeastern Conference individual championships in butterfly events, and received eight All-American honours in two college seasons. After the 2010 college season, she returned to Britain, she then moved back to Wales to train at the Swansea Intensive Training Centre in Wales with coach Bud McAllister, mentor to the triple Olympic champion of 1988, Janet Evans. In 2013 Jemma decided to move her swimming training to Bath National Centre, in 2014 Jemma was part of the Mixed Medley relay with Adam Peaty, that broke the World Record for the first time for GB. In 2016 Jemma retired from her competitive swimming after representing GB for over 10 years.

Lowe competed for Great Britain at the 2008 Summer Olympics in Beijing in two individual events, as well a British relay team. She finished sixth in the 100-metre butterfly final with a time of 58.06, and reached the semi-finals of the 200-metre butterfly, coming ninth with a time of 2:07.87. She was also a member of the British 4x100-metre medley relay team that came fourth in a European record time of 3:57.50.

Lowe, who at 14 was selected for the Smart Track squad of super talents formed by the then Britain Performance Director Bill Sweetenham. She also competed in the 2008 FINA Short Course World Championships, coming third in the 100-metre butterfly and women's 4x100-metre medley relay, as well as fourth in the 200-metre butterfly. She was also part of the women's 4x100-metre medley relay team that won the 2008 European Championships in a then European record.

As her father is Welsh, Lowe competes for Wales at the Commonwealth Games and won a bronze medal in the 100-metre butterfly in the 2010 Commonwealth Games in Delhi.

At the 2012 Summer Olympics in London, she competed for Great Britain. She finished sixth in the 200-metre butterfly final with a time of 2:06.80. She was also a member of the eighth-place British team in the 4x100-metre medley relay.

Lowe held the British records for 100-metre and 200-metre butterfly at both long and short course. She set her long course times at the British Championships (which acted as a qualifier for the Olympics), where she came first in the 200-metre butterfly and second in the 100-metre (she later equalled her 100-metre mark at Beijing). Her short course times for 100-metre and 200-metre butterfly were achieved at the World Short Course Championships and the Middlesbrough Open respectively.

She competed at the 2014 Commonwealth Games.

Jemma now helps athletes obtain sport scholarships at Universities in America with the team at https://www.collegesportsamerica.com/.

== Personal bests and records held ==
Long course	Short course	
50 m butterfly	26.71 (2009)	26.50 (2008)
100 m butterfly	57.43 (2008)	56.32 (2013)
200 m butterfly	2:05.36 (2011)	2:03.19 (2012) ^{NR}
200 m individual medley	2.19.86 (2007)	2.15.34 (2007)
Record Key NR:British

== See also ==
- List of Commonwealth Games medallists in swimming (women)
- List of British records in swimming
- List of University of Florida Olympians
