= Choi Hye-ra =

South Korean swimmer (born 1991)

Personal information
- Full name: Choi Hye-ra
- National team: South Korea
- Born: 20 May 1991 (age 35) Seoul, South Korea
- Height: 1.65 m (5 ft 5 in)
- Weight: 56 kg (123 lb)

Sport
- Sport: Swimming
- Strokes: Butterfly, medley
- Club: Osan Sports
Medal record
Women's swimming
Representing South Korea
Universiade
Silver medal – second place	2011 Shenzhen	200 m medley
Asian Games
Silver medal – second place	2006 Doha	200 m butterfly
Bronze medal – third place	2010 Guangzhou	200 m butterfly
Bronze medal – third place	2010 Guangzhou	200 m medley
Bronze medal – third place	2010 Guangzhou	4×200 m freestyle

Choi Hye-Ra (Korean: 최혜라; born May 20, 1991) is a South Korean swimmer, who specialized in butterfly and individual medley events. She collected four medals (1 silver and 3 bronze) in the 200 m butterfly, 200 m individual medley, and the 800 m freestyle relay at the 2006 Asian Games in Doha, Qatar, and at the 2010 Asian Games in Guangzhou, China. She also won a silver medal in the same medley distance at the 2011 Summer Universiade in Shenzhen, China, with a time of 2:14.17. She is a resident athlete of Osan Sports Club in Seoul.

Choi made her official debut at age 17, at the 2008 Summer Olympics in Beijing. She qualified for three swimming events by eclipsing a FINA A-cut of 2:09.46 (200 m butterfly) from the International Swim Meet in Chiba, Japan. On the first night of the preliminaries, she challenged five other swimmers in heat two, including Cyprus' Natallia Hadjiloizou (previously competed for Belarus). She finished behind Estonia's Triin Aljand in second place and 40th overall with a time of 1:00.65. In the 200 m individual medley, she touched out Slovenia's Anja Klinar to take the third spot on the same heat and 24th overall by 0.13 of a second, in a time of 2:15.26. In her third and final event, 200 m butterfly, she rounded out a top seeded heat with a last-place finish by nearly a second behind Brazil's Joanna Melo in 2:11.42. She failed to advance into the semifinals, as she placed 23rd overall in the preliminary heats.

Four years later, Choi qualified for two swimming events at the 2012 Summer Olympics in London by clearing FINA A-standard entry times of 2:13.00 (200 m individual medley) and 2:08.81 (200 m butterfly) from the FINA World Championships in Shanghai, China. In the 200 m individual medley, she finished heat four in sixth place by 0.19 of a second behind Great Britain's Sophie Allen, lowering her Olympic time to 2:14.91. She placed 24th in the preliminary heats, and did not advance further into the semifinals. Unlike her previous Olympics, she registered a tenth-fastest time of 2:08.45 in the 200 m butterfly to secure her spot for the semifinals on the morning's preliminary heats. She failed to qualify for the final, as she finished the semifinal run with a third-slowest time of 2:08.32.
