= Christine Magnuson =

American swimmer (born 1985)

Personal information
- Full name: Christine Marie Magnuson
- National team: United States
- Born: October 17, 1985 (age 40) Palos Heights, Illinois, U.S.
- Height: 6 ft 1 in (185 cm)
- Weight: 161 lb (73 kg)

Sport
- Sport: Swimming
- Strokes: Butterfly, freestyle
- Club: Tucson Ford Dealers Aquatics
- College team: University of Tennessee
- Coach: Matt Kredich (Tennessee)
Medal record
Women's swimming
Representing the United States
Olympic Games
Silver medal – second place	2008 Beijing	100 m butterfly
Silver medal – second place	2008 Beijing	4×100 m medley
World Championships (LC)
Gold medal – first place	2011 Shanghai	4×100 m medley
World Championships (SC)
Silver medal – second place	2010 Dubai	4×100 m medley
Bronze medal – third place	2012 Istanbul	4×100 m medley
Pan Pacific Championships
Silver medal – second place	2010 Irvine	100 m butterfly
Bronze medal – third place	2010 Irvine	50 m butterfly

Christine Marie Magnuson (born October 17, 1985) is an American competition swimmer and two-time Olympic medalist. She has won a total of five medals in major international competition, four silvers, and one bronze spanning the Olympics, the World Championships, and the Pan Pacific Championships.

Magnuson was born in Palos Heights, Illinois on October 17, 1985, to Geri and Bill Magnuson, both High School teachers. She began swimming by taking lessons, and later swam for Tinley Park's Great Illinois Swim Club where at 10 she had a third place finish at the Illinois Junior Olympics. She attended Grisson Middle High School and later graduated from Victor J. Andrew High School in Tinley Park, Illinois. For a period in Junior High, she played volleyball, but left the volleyball team to concentrate exclusively on swimming as a Freshman at Andrew High. A former state finalist in 2001, in November, 2002, she won an Illinois High School State title in the 100 freestyle with a time of 51.16.

== University swimming career ==
=== University of Tennessee ===
She received an athletic scholarship to attend the University of Tennessee, where she swam for the Tennessee Volunteers swimming and diving team in National Collegiate Athletic Association (NCAA) and Southeastern Conference (SEC) competition from 2005 to 2008 under Women's Head Coach Matt Kredich. At the 2008 NCAA Championships, Magnuson won an individual national championship in the 100-yard butterfly. She finished her college career with 23 All-American honors, three school records and five SEC individual championships. She was the 2008 SEC Swimmer of the Year and the 2008 SEC Scholar Athlete of the Year. She was also awarded the 2008 SEC Commissioners Trophy as the SEC Championship meet high point-scorer. She was a four-time SEC Champion in three events, the 50 free, 100 free, and 100 fly during her time at Tennessee.

In September, 2009, Magnuson began training in Tucson, Arizona, and swam with the Tucson Ford Aquatics Team. She continued training with Tucson Ford team through at least 2013.

== International swimming career ==
=== 2008 Beijing Olympic medals ===
At the 2008 Olympics in Beijing, Magnuson won the silver medal in the 100-meter butterfly final, finishing behind Libby Trickett of Australia who had won the gold medal in an Oceanic record. She also set an American record in that event during the semifinals. Magnuson earned her second medal, also a silver, in the 4×100-meter medley relay finishing behind team Australia.

=== 2009 World Championships ===
Magnuson advanced to the 100-meter butterfly semifinals and finished tenth overall. Magnuson also swam the third leg in the 4×100-meter freestyle relay but the United States finished fourth in the final.

== See also ==
- List of Olympic medalists in swimming (women)
- List of University of Tennessee people
- List of World Aquatics Championships medalists in swimming (women)
