= Bill Sweetenham =

Australian swimming coach (born 1950)

William Sweetenham AM (born 23 March 1950) is an elite swimming coach. He has coached swimming teams of Australia, Britain, Hong Kong and the Argentina national swimming team. During his career, Sweetenham was Head National Team Coach at five Olympic Games, coached 27 medallists at the Olympic Games and World Championships, and nine world record holders.

== Career ==
=== Australia ===
Sweetenham began his coaching career in his hometown of Mount Isa. He then replaced Laurie Lawrence at the Carina Swimming Club in Brisbane, Queensland. While at the club he coached three of the greatest distance swimmers – Stephen Holland, Tracey Wickham and Michelle Ford. Sweetenham then became the first Queensland Director of Coaching.

In 1980, Sweetenham was appointed inaugural Women's Head Swimming Coach at the Australian Institute of Sport (AIS). From late 1985 to 1991, he was Head Coach. During his time at the AIS, Sweetenham was involved in coaching Olympic and Commonwealth Games medallists Michelle Pearson, Karen Phillips, Suzanne Landells, Georgina Parkes and Rob Woodhouse. In 1983, while at the AIS, he suffered serious leg injuries as a result of a car accident in West Germany. From 1995 to 2001, he was the National Youth Coach for Swimming Australia and during this period the programme produced a number of future Australian national team members including Ian Thorpe and Grant Hackett. He managed the Australian swim team for four Olympic Games and five Commonwealth Games.

=== Hong Kong ===
In 1991, he was Head Swimming Coach at the Hong Kong Sports Institute and Hong Kong's Head Olympic Swim Coach. He returned to Australia in 1995 to become Swimming Australia's National Youth Coach.

=== Great Britain National Performance Director ===
Sweetenham's tenure with Great Britain was marked by medal success at World Championship level, Olympic disappointment, and recurring controversy on his man-management methods. He was the National Performance Director for British Swimming from November 2000 to September 2007. Prior to the 2004 Athens Olympic Games, Sweetenham's tenure as Director marked considerable progress in British swimming. Britain won as many medals at the 2001, 2003 and 2005 Swimming World Championships as it had at all previous World Championships back to 1973.

On 3 September 2007, British Swimming announced that Bill Sweetenham had stood down as NPD citing personal reasons. Sweetenham had previously indicated that he would not renew his contract, which was due for renewal following the 2008 Summer Olympics in Beijing.

=== Argentina ===
The Argentina Federation of Water Sports reported in 2013 about the arrival of Bill Sweetenham, for beginning work in conjunction with the national team and in order to improve the areas of training, technical training bodies, and sports organizations in the coming years. This initiative was supported by the ENARD and Sports Secretary's Office, will have to Sweetenham until day 28 in Argentina.

== Publishing ==
Sweetenham has been a prolific contributor to swimming coaching. In 1998, he produced a nine-volume video collection titled Swimming in the 21st Century which covered all the swimming strokes. In 2003, with John Atkinson he wrote Championship Swim Training.

== Recognition ==
- 1979 – Australian Swim Coach of the Year
- 1981 – Australian Swim Coach of the Year
- 1981 – Australian Coach of the Year
- 1981 – Churchill Fellow to study swimming training in the United States.
- 1986 – Awarded "Most outstanding contribution to Australian Swimming"
- 1987 -"Master Coach" award in 1987
- 1988 – Awarded "Most outstanding contribution to Australian Swimming"
- 1987 – Australian Swim Coach of the Year
- 1989 – Member of the Order of Australia (OAM)
- 2000 – Australian Sports Medal
- 2018 – inducted into International Swimming Hall of Fame
