= Martina van Berkel =

Swiss swimmer (born 1989)

Martina van Berkel-Schwarz
Personal information
- Full name: Martina Eva van Berkel-Schwarz
- Nationality: Switzerland
- Born: 23 January 1989 (age 37) Bülach, Switzerland
- Height: 1.66 m (5 ft 5 1/2 in)
- Weight: 54 kg (119 lb)

Sport
- Sport: Swimming
- Strokes: Butterfly
- Club: Limmat Sharks
- Coach: Dirk Reinicke

Martina Eva van Berkel-Schwarz (born 23 January 1989 in Bülach) is a Swiss swimmer, who specialized in butterfly events. She currently holds several Swiss records in the 100 and 200 m butterfly. Van Berkel also trains for the Limmat Sharks in Zurich under her personal coach Dirk Reinicke. She is the sister of one of the nation's prominent triathletes Jan van Berkel, who forged and motivated her to compete internationally in swimming.

Van Berkel qualified for the women's 200 m butterfly at the 2012 Summer Olympics in London, by blasting a Swiss record and clearing a FINA B-standard entry time of 2:09.68 from the World Championships in Shanghai, China. She challenged seven other swimmers on the second heat, including defending Olympic bronze medalist Jessicah Schipper of Australia. Van Berkel raced to seventh place by exactly three seconds behind Canada's Audrey Lacroix in 2:12.25. Van Berkel failed to advance into the semifinals, as she placed twenty-fifth overall in the preliminaries.
