= Ellen Gandy =

British-Australian swimmer

Personal information
- Full name: Ellen May Gandy
- Nickname: "Elly"
- National team: Great Britain; Australia
- Born: 15 August 1991 (age 35) Bromley, England
- Height: 1.70 m (5 ft 7 in)
- Weight: 60 kg (9 st 6 lb; 132 lb)

Sport
- Sport: Swimming
- Strokes: Butterfly
- Club: Nunawading
- Coach: Rohan Taylor
Medal record
Women's swimming
Representing Great Britain
World Championships (LC)
Silver medal – second place	2011 Shanghai	200 m butterfly
European Championships (LC)
Silver medal – second place	2008 Eindhoven	4×200 m freestyle
Bronze medal – third place	2010 Budapest	200 m butterfly
Representing England
Commonwealth Games
Silver medal – second place	2010 Delhi	100 m butterfly
Silver medal – second place	2010 Delhi	4×100 m medley
Bronze medal – third place	2010 Delhi	200 m butterfly

Ellen May Gandy (born 15 August 1991), also known by her nickname Elly Gandy, is a British-born Australian former female butterfly swimmer. She represented Great Britain and England until 2012, and had almost all of her elite-level success under those flags. She represented Great Britain at the 2008 Summer Olympics and 2012 Summer Olympics in the 200m butterfly swimming event, and was the 2011 World silver medalist at that distance.

Following a disappointing 2012 Games, Gandy expressed an intention to swim for Australia, having lived and trained there since 2007, and served a period of ineligibility in order to do so. She represented Australia for the first time at a FINA World Cup event in Eindhoven in August 2013. She competed for Australia at the 2014 Commonwealth Games but failed to medal. Gandy did not qualify for the 2016 Summer Olympics, effectively ending her elite swimming career.

Under her new flag, Gandy broke the Australian and Commonwealth short-course 200m butterfly record. She remains the British long course record-holder in the 100 and 200 metre butterfly.

== Swimming career ==
At the age of 13, Gandy was selected by talent scouts to be a member of Britain's Smart Track squad of super talents formed by performance director Bill Sweetenham.

As a 16 year old she competed at the 2008 Olympics in the 200 m butterfly.

On 19 March 2009 Gandy swam a European record time in the women's 200m butterfly at the British Championships in Sheffield. Her time of 2:04.83 beat the previous record of 2:05.61 set by Poland's Otylia Jędrzejczak and was almost two seconds faster than Jemma Lowe's previous British record.

In 2011 at the World Championships in Shanghai, Gandy claimed silver in the 200m butterfly. She was second to Jiao Liuyang, China's Olympic silver medallist of 2008, and ahead of the bronze medallist Liu Zige, Olympic champion for China in 2008.

Gandy secured her place in the British team for the 2012 Olympics with victory in the 100 m and 200 m butterfly in the trials at the London Aquatics Centre. At the Olympics she finished in 19th place.

She competed for Australia at the 2014 Commonwealth Games.

== Personal life ==
Gandy started school at Balgowan Primary School, Beckenham, UK and then went to Langley Park School for Girls, Beckenham before moving to Melbourne, Australia in 2007 where she attended Carey Baptist Grammar School. Since her switch, Gandy has publicly adopted the first name Elly, the name by which she has been known privately in Australia.

Following her swimming career, Gandy qualified to practice law in Australia, qualifying as a solicitor and working as a corporate counsel.

== See also ==
- List of World Aquatics Championships medalists in swimming (women)
- List of Commonwealth Games medallists in swimming (women)
