= Jiao Liuyang =

Chinese swimmer (born 1991)

Personal information
- Full name: Jiao Liuyang
- Nationality: Chinese
- Born: August 6, 1991 (age 34) Harbin, Heilongjiang, China
- Height: 173 cm (5 ft 8 in)
- Weight: 63 kg (139 lb)

Sport
- Sport: Swimming
- Strokes: butterfly
Medal record
Representing China
Olympic Games
Gold medal – first place	2012 London	200m butterfly
Silver medal – second place	2008 Beijing	200m butterfly
World Championships (LC)
Gold medal – first place	2009 Rome	4×100 m medley
Gold medal – first place	2011 Shanghai	200 m butterfly
Silver medal – second place	2011 Shanghai	4×100 m medley
Bronze medal – third place	2009 Rome	100m butterfly
World Championships (SC)
Silver medal – second place	2012 Istanbul	50 m butterfly
Silver medal – second place	2012 Istanbul	200 m butterfly
Asian Games
Gold medal – first place	2010 Guangzhou	100 m butterfly
Gold medal – first place	2010 Guangzhou	200 m butterfly
Gold medal – first place	2010 Guangzhou	4×100 m medley
Gold medal – first place	2014 Incheon	200 m butterfly
Asian Championships
Gold medal – first place	2006 Singapore	200 m butterfly
Gold medal – first place	2009 Foshan	50m butterfly
Gold medal – first place	2009 Foshan	100m butterfly
Silver medal – second place	2009 Foshan	200m butterfly

Jiao Liuyang (simplified Chinese: 焦刘洋; traditional Chinese: 焦劉洋; pinyin: Jiāo Liúyáng; born August 6, 1991) is a retired Chinese swimmer who won the 200 m butterfly at the 2012 Olympics, and formerly held the world record in the 4×100 m medley relay.

== Career ==
At the 2006 Asian Championships in Singapore, Jiao won gold in the 200 m butterfly, setting a championship record of 2:08.54.

Jiao competed at the 2007 World Championships in Melbourne, recording 2:07.22 to finish fourth in the 200 m butterfly.

At the 2008 Olympics in Beijing, Jiao won the silver medal in the 200 m butterfly with a time of 2:04.72. She and gold medalist Liu Zige surpassed the former world record of 2:05.40 set by Jessicah Schipper in 2006.

Competing at the 2009 World Championships in Rome, Jiao won the bronze medal in the 100 m butterfly, recording 56.86 to set a new Asian record. She then competed in the 200 m butterfly, finishing fifth in a personal best time of 2:04.50. Her final event was the 4×100 m medley relay, where she split 56.28 on the butterfly leg. China won the gold medal in 3:52.19, breaking Australia's world record of 3:52.69 from 2008. China's mark stood until 2012.

Jiao competed at the 2010 Asian Games. On day one, she competed in two events. First was the 100 m butterfly, where she won the gold medal in a time of 57.76, breaking the games record in the event. She then swam the butterfly leg of the 4×100 m medley relay, winning the gold medal in a games record time of 3:57.80. On day three, Jiao recorded 2:05.79 in the 200 m butterfly, winning another gold medal in games record time.

At the 2011 Chinese Championships in Wuhan, Jiao qualified for the Shanghai World Championships in the 200 m butterfly, recording a personal best of 2:04.44. In Shanghai, Jiao went 2:05.55 to win the gold medal in the 200 m butterfly.

At the 2012 Olympics in London, Jiao won the gold medal in the 200 m butterfly with a time of 2:04.06. This was a new Olympic record and as of 2012, the fastest time in a textile suit.

At the 2013 World Championships in Barcelona, Jiao finished sixth in the 200 m butterfly with a time of 2:06.65. She later competed at the Chinese National Games in Shenyang, she went 2:04.54 in the 200 m butterfly to record the fastest time of the year.

In 2014, Jiao competed at the Asian Games in Incheon, winning the 200 m butterfly gold medal in 2:07.56.

== See also ==
- China at the 2012 Summer Olympics - Swimming
