= Haruka Ueda =

Japanese swimmer (born 1988)

Personal information
- Nationality: Japan
- Born: April 27, 1988 (age 38) Tokyo, Japan
- Height: 177 cm (5 ft 10 in)
- Weight: 68 kg (150 lb)

Sport
- Sport: Swimming
- Strokes: freestyle
- Club: Tokyo Swimming Center
- College team: Nihon University
Medal record
Women's swimming
Representing Japan
Olympic Games
Bronze medal – third place	2012 London	4×100 m medley
Pan Pacific Championships
Bronze medal – third place	2006 Victoria	4×200 m freestyle
Bronze medal – third place	2010 Irvine	4×100 m medley

Haruka Ueda (上田 春佳, Ueda Haruka; born April 27, 1988 in Tokyo) is a Japanese freestyle swimmer.

She married swimmer Kazuya Kaneda in 2014.

== Major achievements ==
- 2005 World Championships – 200m freestyle 22nd (2:01.65)
- 2007 World Championships – 100m freestyle 39th (57.21)
- 2008 Beijing Olympics – 200m freestyle 13th (1:58.44)

== Personal bests ==
In long course:

- 100m freestyle: 55.05 (June 7, 2008)
- 200m freestyle: 1:57.37 Japanese Record (April 9, 2011)

In short course

- 100m freestyle: 53.41 former Japanese Record (February 22, 2009)
- 200m freestyle: 1:53.72 Japanese Record, former Asian record (February 21, 2009)
