= Sara Oliveira =

Portuguese swimmer (born 1985)

Personal information
- Full name: Sara de Jesus Freitas de Oliveira
- National team: Portugal
- Born: 7 December 1985 (age 40) Porto, Portugal
- Height: 1.67 m (5 ft 6 in)
- Weight: 60 kg (132 lb)

Sport
- Sport: Swimming
- Strokes: Butterfly
- Club: FC Porto
Medal record
Women's swimming
Representing Portugal
European Junior Championships
Bronze medal – third place	2001 Malta	100 m butterfly

Sara de Jesus Freitas de Oliveira (born 7 December 1985) is an Olympic swimmer from Portugal. She has swum for Portugal at 2008 and 2012 Olympics, as well as at multiple World Championships (2003, 2007, 2011) and Short Course Worlds (2010, 2012).

At the 2012 Olympics she swam the Women's 100 and 200 Butterfly. At those games, she finished 36th overall in the heats in the 100 m butterfly and failed to reach the final. In the 200 m butterfly, she finished in 24th place and also did not reach the final.
