= Irina Bespalova =

Russian swimmer (born 1981)

Personal information
- Full name: Ирина Николаевна Беспалова
- Nationality: Russia
- Born: May 31, 1981 (age 45) Arkhangelsk, Russian SFSR, Soviet Union
- Height: 1.72 m (5 ft 7 1/2 in)
- Weight: 60 kg (132 lb)

Sport
- Sport: Swimming
- Strokes: Butterfly
- Club: Russian Army Sports Club
Medal record
Women's swimming
Representing Russia
European Championships (SC)
Silver medal – second place	2011 Szczecin	4×50 m medley
Summer Universiade
Gold medal – first place	2001 Beijing	100 m butterfly
Silver medal – second place	2003 Daegu	50 m butterfly
Bronze medal – third place	2003 Daegu	100 m butterfly
Bronze medal – third place	2005 Izmir	4x100 m medley

Irina Nikolayevna Bespalova (born May 31, 1981) is a female butterfly swimmer from Russia, who represented her native country at the 2008 Summer Olympics in Beijing, PR China. She competed in the women's 100m butterfly and the women's 4 × 100 m medley at the 2012 Summer Olympics.
