= Natsumi Hoshi =

Japanese swimmer (born 1990)

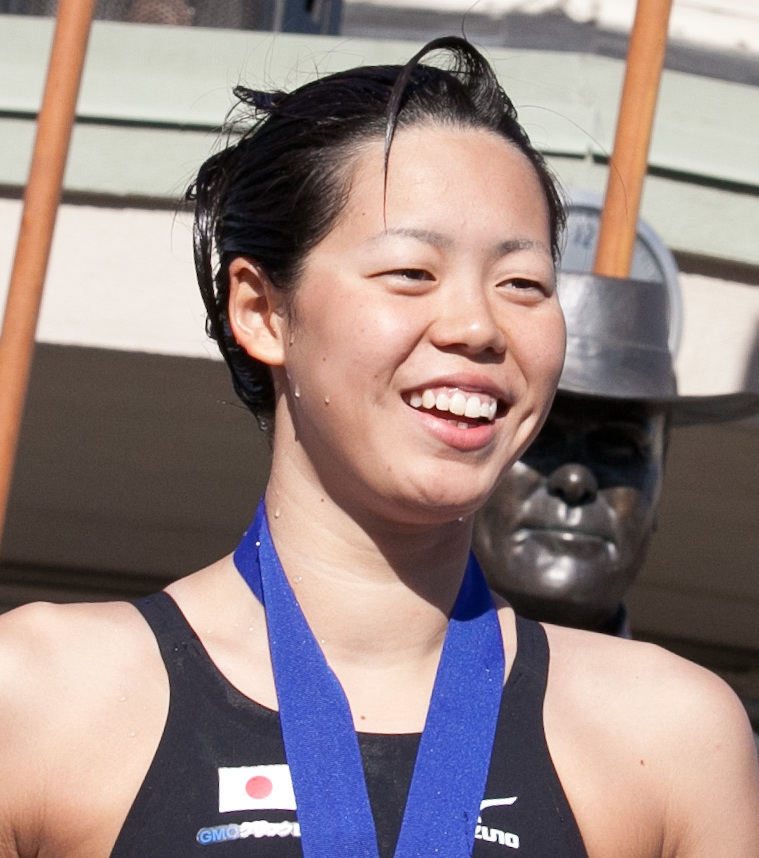
- Hoshi in 2012

Personal information
- National team: Japan
- Born: August 21, 1990 (age 35) Saitama, Japan
- Height: 1.64 m (5 ft 5 in)
- Weight: 54 kg (119 lb)

Sport
- Sport: Swimming
- Strokes: Butterfly
- Club: Mizuno
- Coach: Yoshikatsu Harada; Norimasa Hirai (national)
Medal record
Representing Japan
Olympic Games
Bronze medal – third place	2012 London	200 m butterfly
Bronze medal – third place	2016 Rio de Janeiro	200 m butterfly
World Championships (LC)
Gold medal – first place	2015 Kazan	200 m butterfly
Pan Pacific Championships
Silver medal – second place	2014 Gold Coast	200 m butterfly
Asian Games
Gold medal – first place	2014 Incheon	4×100 m medley
Silver medal – second place	2010 Guangzhou	200 m butterfly
Silver medal – second place	2014 Incheon	200 m butterfly

Natsumi Hoshi (星 奈津美, Hoshi Natsumi; born August 21, 1990) is a Japanese competitive swimmer who specializes in the 200-meter butterfly. In this event she won the world title in 2015 and bronze medals at the 2012 and 2016 Olympics.

Hoshi studied sports science at Waseda University in Tokyo, and enjoys shopping in her spare time. In 2006, she showed symptoms of Graves' disease, a condition that results in an overactive thyroid and frequent fatigue. Her thyroid gland was removed in November 2014, and in January 2015 she returned to competitions. Earlier in 2011 she was named Best Athlete of the Year by the Saitama Swimming Federation.
