= Emilia Pikkarainen =

Finnish swimmer

Personal information
- National team: Finland
- Born: Emilia Pikkarainen; 11 October 1992 (age 33) Vantaa, Finland

Sport
- Sport: Swimming
- Strokes: Butterfly
Medal record
Women's Swimming
Representing Finland
European Championships (LC)
Bronze medal – third place	2016 London	4×100 m medley
European Championships (SC)
Silver medal – second place	2012 Chartres	4x50 m freestyle
Bronze medal – third place	2010 Eindhoven	4x50 m freestyle

Emilia Pikkarainen (born 11 October 1992) is a Finnish swimmer. She holds the Finnish record in 50 metres butterfly (26.90), 100 metres butterfly (59.02), 200 metres butterfly (2:10.89), and 200 metres individual medley (2:14.23).

Born in Vantaa, Pikkarainen took part in the 2008 Olympics, aged 15, she competed in the 100 m butterfly and swam 1:02.31, ranking 46th. In the 2012 Olympics she competed in the 100 and 200 metres butterfly and the 200 metres individual medley. In the 2016 Olympics she competed as part of the Finnish team in the 4 × 100 metre medley relay.

She had been in a relationship with Formula 1 driver Valtteri Bottas since 2010. The couple married in September 2016 at St. John's Church, Helsinki. On 28 November 2019, Valtteri Bottas announced their separation and divorce, citing "challenges my career and life situation bring".
