= Yuka Kato =

Japanese swimmer (born 1986)

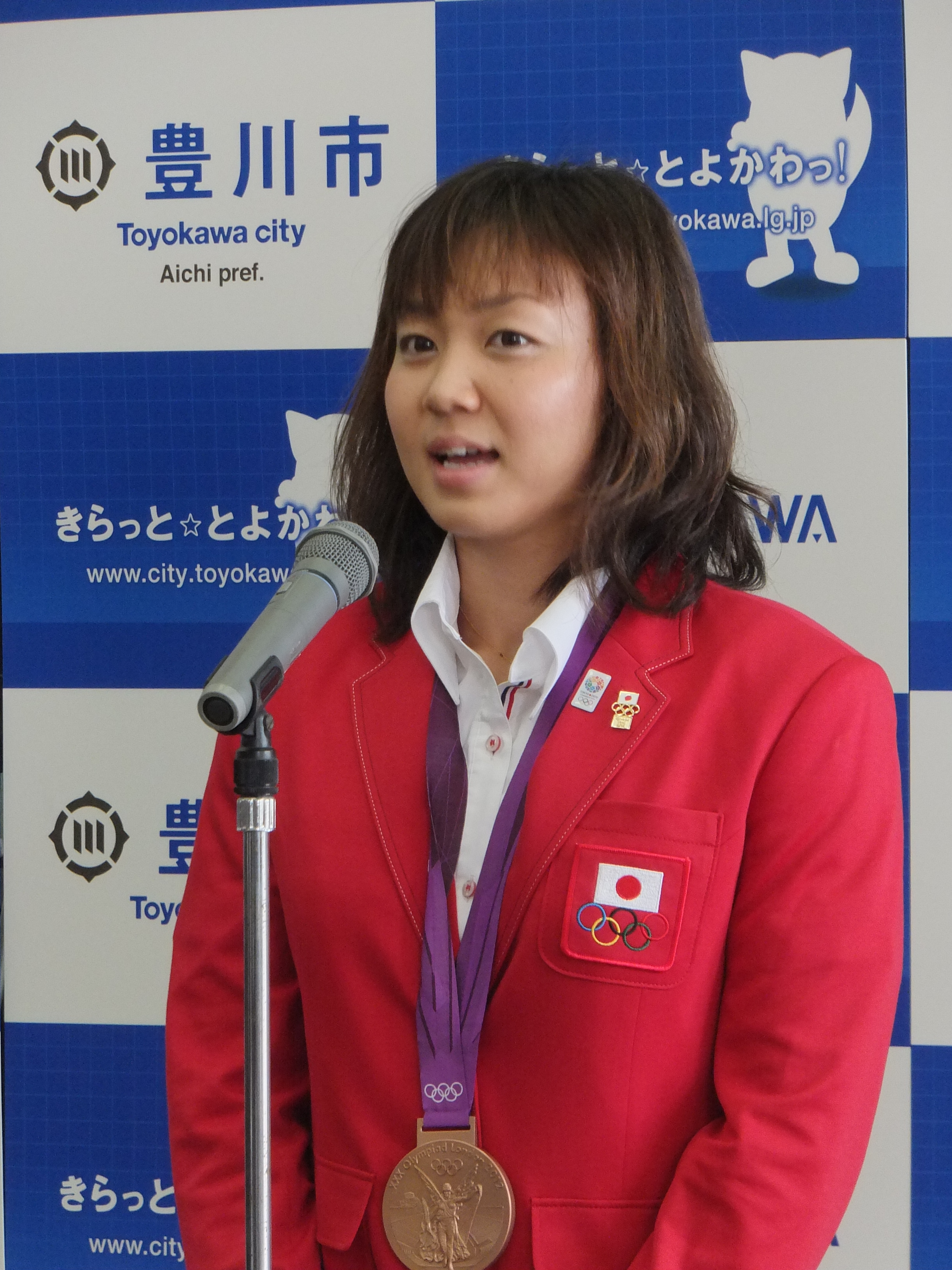

Medal record

Women's swimming

Representing Japan

Olympic Games
Bronze medal – third place	2012 London	4×100 m medley

Pan Pacific Championships
Bronze medal – third place	2010 Irvine	4×100 m medley

Yuka Kato (加藤ゆか, Katō Yuka; born October 30, 1986 in Toyokawa, Aichi, Japan) is a Japanese butterfly swimmer.

== Major achievements ==
2007 World Championships

- 50 m butterfly 10th (26.91)

2008 Beijing Olympics

- 100 m butterfly 23rd (58.94)
- 4 × 100 m medley relay 6th (Heat 3:59.91, Final 3:59.54)

2012 London Olympics

- 100 m butterfly 11th
- 4 x 100 m medley relay 3rd

== Personal Bests ==
In long course

- 50 m butterfly: 26.07 Japanese Record (April 10, 2011)
- 100 m butterfly: 57:80 former Japanese Record (April 11, 2011)

In short course

- 50 m butterfly: 25.34 Japanese Record (10 November 2013)
- 100 m butterfly: 56.09 Japanese Record (9 November 2013)
