= Swimming at the 1997 European Aquatics Championships – Women's 200 metre butterfly =

The final of the Women's 200 metres Butterfly event at the European LC Championships 1997 was held on Sunday 24 August 1997 in Seville, Spain.

== Finals ==
RANK	FINAL A	TIME
	María Peláez (ESP)	2:10.25
	Michelle Smith (IRL)	2:10.88
	Mette Jacobsen (DEN)	2:11.97
4.	Anna Uryniuk (POL)	2:12.01
5.	Silvia Szalai (GER)	2:12.52
6.	Martina Moravcová (SVK)	2:12.71
7.	Bárbara Franco (ESP)	2:12.74
8.	Katrin Jäke (GER)	2:13.08

RANK	FINAL B	TIME
9.	Sophia Skou (DEN)	2:13.48
10.	Margaretha Pedder (GBR)	2:14.03
11.	Johanna Sjöberg (SWE)	2:14.56
12.	Paola Cavallino (ITA)	2:15.48
13.	Cécile Jeanson (FRA)	2:16.02
14.	Ana Francisco (POR)	2:16.41
15.	Kim Van Kruyssen (BEL)	2:16.81
16.	Marcela Kubalčíková (CZE)	2:16.93

== Qualifying heats ==
RANK	HEATS RANKING	TIME
1.	Martina Moravcová (SVK)	2:12.65
2.	Silvia Szalai (GER)	2:12.69
3.	Michelle Smith (IRL)	2:12.86
4.	María Peláez (ESP)	2:13.42
5.	Katrin Jäke (GER)	2:13.51
6.	Anna Urynuik (POL)	2:13.55
7.	Mette Jacobsen (DEN)	2:13.61
8.	Bárbara Franco (ESP)	2:14.03
9.	Margaretha Pedder (GBR)	2:14.34
10.	Sophia Skou (DEN)	2:15.19
11.	Paola Cavallino (ITA)	2:16.08
12.	Cécile Jeanson (FRA)	2:16.27
13.	Kim Van Kruyssen (BEL)	2:16.58
14.	Ana Francisco (POR)	2:16.98
15.	Johanna Sjöberg (SWE)	2:17.08
16.	Marcela Kubalčíková (CZE)	2:17.29
17.	Ana Maria Gheorghe (ROM)	2:17.46
18.	Andrea Simaková (CZE)	2:17.71
19.	Edit Klocker (HUN)	2:19.51
20.	Krisztina Csapo (HUN)	2:19.64
21.	Tinka Dancevic (CRO)	2:19.95
22.	Urska Ros (SLO)	2:20.43
23.	Yana Klochkova (UKR)	2:21.93
24.	Catalina Casaru (ROM)	2:24.95

== See also ==
- 1996 Women's Olympic Games 200m Butterfly
- 1997 Women's World Championships (SC) 200m Butterfly
