= Swimming at the 1998 World Aquatics Championships – Women's 200 metre butterfly =

Women's 200 metre butterfly at the 1998 FINA World Championships
- Date: 18 January 1998
- Winning time: 2 minutes 07.93 seconds

Medalists
gold medal	Susie O'Neill	Australia
silver medal	Petria Thomas	Australia
bronze medal	Misty Hyman	United States

The finals and the qualifying heats of the women's 200 metre butterfly event at the 1998 World Aquatics Championships were held on Sunday 18 January 1998 in Perth, Western Australia.

== A Final ==
Rank	Name	Time
Gold medal	Susie O'Neill (AUS)	2:07.93
Silver medal	Petria Thomas (AUS)	2:09.08
Bronze medal	Misty Hyman (USA)	2:09.98
4	Wu Yanyan (CHN)	2:10.22
5	Qu Yun (CHN)	2:10.49
6	Jessica Deglau (CAN)	2:11.26
7	Katrin Jake (GER)	2:12.20
8	Kristine Quance (USA)	2:15.35

== B Final ==
Rank	Name	Time
9	Anna Uryniuk (POL)	2:12.46
10	Sophia Skou (DEN)	2:13.70
11	Cécile Jeanson (FRA)	2:14.41
12	Yasuko Tajima (JPN)	2:14.58
13	María Peláez (ESP)	2:14.76
14	Bárbara Franco (ESP)	2:15.14
15	Hitomi Kashima (JPN)	2:15.53
16	Margaretha Pedder (GBR)	2:16.34

== See also ==
- 1996 Women's Olympic Games 200m Butterfly (Atlanta)
- 1997 Women's World SC Championships 200m Butterfly (Gothenburg)
- 1997 Women's European LC Championships 200m Butterfly (Seville)
- 2000 Women's Olympic Games 200m Butterfly (Sydney)
