= Swimming at the 2003 World Aquatics Championships – Women's 200 metre butterfly =

Women's 200m Butterfly at the 2003 FINA World Aquatics Championships
- Dates: 23 July 2003 (prelims, semifinals); 24 July 2003 (final)

Medalists
gold medal	Otylia Jędrzejczak	Poland
silver medal	Eva Risztov	Hungary
bronze medal	Yuko Nakanishi	Japan

The Women's 200m Butterfly event at the 10th FINA World Aquatics Championships swam 23–24 July 2003 in Barcelona, Spain. Preliminary heats swam in the morning session of 20 July, with the top-16 finishers advancing to semifinal heats that evening. The top-8 finishers from the Semifinals then advanced to swim again in the Final the next evening.

At the start of the event, the World (WR) and Championship (CR) records were:

- WR: 2:05.78 swum by Otylia Jędrzejczak (Poland) on August 4, 2002 in Berlin, Germany.
- CR: 2:06.73 swum by Petria Thomas (Australia) on July 23, 2001 in Fukuoka, Japan

== Results ==
=== Final ===
Place	Swimmer	Nation	Time	Notes
1	Otylia Jędrzejczak	Poland	2:07.56	
2	Éva Risztov	Hungary	2:07.68	
3	Yuko Nakanishi	Japan	2:08.08	
4	Mary DeScenza	USA	2:08.38	
5	Francesca Segat	Italy	2:09.49	
6	Annika Mehlhorn	Germany	2:09.61	
7	Felicity Galvez	Australia	2:10.58	
8	Roser Vives	Spain	2:12.89	

=== Semifinals ===
Rank	Heat + Lane	Swimmer	Nation	Time	Notes
1	S2 L5	Otylia Jędrzejczak	Poland	2:08.42	q
2	S2 L4	Mary DeScenza	USA	2:08.71	q
3	S1 L4	Éva Risztov	Hungary	2:08.88	q
4	S2 L3	Yuko Nakanishi	Japan	2:09.41	q
5	S1 L6	Francesca Segat	Italy	2:10.72	q
6	S1 L3	Roser Vives	Spain	2:10.98	q
7	S1 L4	Felicity Galvez	Australia	2:10.99	q
8	S2 L6	Annika Mehlhorn	Germany	2:11.42	q
9	S2 L8	Yukiko Osada	Japan	2:12.02	
10	S1 L7	Jessicah Schipper	Australia	2:12.28	
11	S2 L7	Li Cui	China	2:12.49	
12	S2 L2	Tianyi Zhang	China	2:12.56	
13	S2 L1	Mandy Loots	South Africa	2:12.74	
14	S1 L2	Emily Mason	USA	2:12.76	
14	S1 L1	Natalia Soutiaguina	Russia	2:12.76	
16	S1 L8	Zampia Melachroinou	Greece	2:13.96	

=== Preliminaries ===
Rank	Heat+Lane	Swimmer	Nation	Time	Notes
1	H4 L5	Mary DeScenza	United States	2:09.08	q
2	H5 L4	Éva Risztov	Hungary	2:09.32	q
3	H6 L4	Otylia Jędrzejczak	Poland	2:10.30	q
4	H6 L7	Yana Klochkova	Ukraine	2:10.52	q, scratched semis
5	H6 L6	Felicity Galvez	Australia	2:10.65	q
6	H4 L4	Yuko Nakanishi	Japan	2:10.68	q
7	H5 L2	Roser Vives	Spain	2:10.73	q
8	H6 L5	Annika Mehlhorn	Germany	2:10.85	q
9	H6 L3	Francesca Segat	Italy	2:11.02	q
10	H5 L7	Tianyi Zhang	China	2:12.10	q
11	H5 L3	Emily Mason	United States	2:12.33	q
12	H4 L3	Li Cui	China	2:12.35	q
13	H5 L6	Jessicah Schipper	Australia	2:12.36	q
14	H5 L5	Georgina Lee	Great Britain	2:12.46	q, scratched semis
15	H4 L7	Natalia Soutiaguina	Russia	2:12.70	q
16	H4 L6	Yukiko Osada	Japan	2:12.77	q
17	H5 L8	Zampia Melachroinou	Greece	2:12.81	
18	H3 L3	Mandy Loots	South Africa	2:12.84	
19	H4 L2	María Peláez	Spain	2:13.64	
20	H4 L1	Petra Zahrl	Austria	2:13.74	
21	H6 L2	Jen Button	Canada	2:13.86	
22	H5 L1	Elizabeth Van Welie	New Zealand	2:14.11	
23	H6 L8	Raquel Felgueiras	Portugal	2:16.53	
24	H2 L4	Vesna Stojanvoska	Macedonia	2:16.54	
25	H6 L1	Sara Oliveira	Portugal	2:16.81	
26	H3 L1	Gülşah Günenç	Turkey	2:17.66	
27	H3 L5	Gabriella Fagundez	Sweden	2:18.06	
28	H1 L3	Kyung Hwa Park	South Korea	2:18.40	
29	H2 L2	Maria Rodriguez	Venezuela	2:19.06	
30	H3 L2	Marcella Amar	Brazil	2:19.12	
31	H2 L5	Maria Bulakhova	Russia	2:19.33	
32	H4 L8	Monique Ferreira	Brazil	2:19.48	
33	H3 L4	Leonore Kelleher	Ireland	2:19.53	
34	H2 L6	Richa Mishra	India	2:19.58	
35	H3 L8	Wing Suet Chan	Hong Kong	2:20.11	
36	H2 L3	Angela Galea	Malta	2:22.57	
37	H3 L6	Mariana Bertellotti	Argentina	2:25.24	
38	H3 L7	Flora Kong	Hong Kong	2:26.39	
39	H1 L4	Natasha George	Saint Lucia	2:39.77	
-	-	Simona Muccioli	San Marino	DNS	
-	-	Elize Taua	Samoa	DNS	
-	-	Vered Borochovsky	Israel	DNS	
