= 1997 FINA Short Course World Championships – Women's 200m butterfly =

International Sporting Competition

The finals and the qualifying heats of the women's 200 metres butterfly event at the 1997 FINA Short Course World Championships were held on the first day of the competition, on Thursday 17 April 1997 in Gothenburg, Sweden.

== Finals ==
RANK	FINAL A	TIME
	Liu Limin (CHN)	2:07.20
	Hitomi Kashima (JPN)	2:07.34
	Misty Hyman (USA)	2:07.54
4.	Yun Qu (CHN)	2:08.74
5.	Johanna Sjöberg (SWE)	2:09.25
6.	Mette Jacobsen (DEN)	2:09.28
7.	Jessica Deglau (CAN)	2:10.73
8.	Angela Kennedy (AUS)	2:13.73

RANK	FINAL B	TIME
9.	Katrin Jäke (GER)	2:10.56
10.	Sophia Skou (DEN)	2:11.18
11.	Margaretha Pedder (GBR)	2:11.35
12.	Lia Oberstar (USA)	2:11.53
13.	Catherine Surya (INA)	2:11.66
14.	Andrea Schwartz (CAN)	2:12.66
15.	Bárbara Franco (ESP)	2:12.75
16.	Silvia Szalai (GER)	2:17.94

== Qualifying heats ==
RANK	HEATS RANKING	TIME
1.	Misty Hyman (USA)	2:07.78
2.	Yun Qu (CHN)	2:09.54
3.	Hitomi Kashima (JPN)	2:09.63
4.	Mette Jacobsen (DEN)	2:10.53
5.	Jessica Deglau (CAN)	2:10.83
6.	Johanna Sjöberg (SWE)	2:10.84
7.	Liu Limin (CHN)	2:11.14
8.	Angela Kennedy (AUS)	2:11.31
9.	Catherine Surya (INA)	2:11.53
10.	Margaretha Pedder (GBR)	2:11.62
11.	Lia Oberstar (USA)	2:11.70
12.	Katrin Jäke (GER)	2:11.78
13.	Silvia Szalai (GER)	2:12.09
14.	Bárbara Franco (ESP)	2:12.30
15.	Sophia Skou (DEN)	2:12.40
16.	Andrea Schwartz (CAN)	2:13.31
17.	Anna Uryniuk (POL)	2:14.26
18.	Svetlana Pozdeyeva (RUS)	2:14.95
19.	María Pereyra (ARG)	2:15.06
20.	Ana Francisco (POR)	2:16.26
21.	Melissa Mata (CRC)	2:16.62
22.	Mikaela Laurén (SWE)	2:16.88
23.	Praphalsai Minpraphal (THA)	2:17.16
24.	Jana Pechanová (CZE)	2:18.30
25.	Ania Piedra (CRC)	2:18.71
26.	Candice Crafford (RSA)	2:18.76

== See also ==
- 1996 Women's Olympic Games 200m Butterfly
- 1997 Women's European LC Championships 200m Butterfly
