= Swimming at the 1998 World Aquatics Championships – Women's 100 metre butterfly =

Women's 100 metre butterfly at the 1998 FINA World Championships
- Date: 15 January 1998
- Winning time: 58.46 seconds

Medalists
gold medal	Jenny Thompson	United States
silver medal	Ayari Aoyama	Japan
bronze medal	Petria Thomas	Australia

The finals and the qualifying heats of the women's 100 metre butterfly event at the 1998 World Aquatics Championships were held on Thursday 15 January 1998 in Perth, Western Australia.

== A Final ==
Rank	Name	Time
Gold medal	Jenny Thompson (USA)	58.46 CR
Silver medal	Ayari Aoyama (JPN)	58.79
Bronze medal	Petria Thomas (AUS)	58.97
4	Misty Hyman (USA)	59.12
5	Susie O'Neill (AUS)	59.27
6	Martina Moravcová (SVK)	59.47
7	Inge de Bruijn (NED)	1:00.09
8	Hitomi Kashima (JPN)	1:00.43

== B Final ==
Rank	Name	Time
9	Mette Jacobsen (DEN)	1:00.71
10	Johanna Sjöberg (SWE)	1:00.99
11	Katrin Jäke (GER)	1:01.24
12	Sophia Skou (DEN)	1:01.43
13	Elena Nazemnova (RUS)	1:01.55
14	Cécile Jeanson (FRA)	1:01.57
15	Jessica Deglau (CAN)	1:01.61
16	Anna Nyiry (HUN)	1:01.98

== See also ==
- 1996 Women's Olympic Games 100m Butterfly (Atlanta)
- 1997 Women's World SC Championships 100m Butterfly (Gothenburg)
- 1997 Women's European LC Championships 100m Butterfly (Seville)
- 2000 Women's Olympic Games 100m Butterfly (Sydney)
