= Swimming at the 2001 World Aquatics Championships – Women's 100 metre butterfly =

Women's 100 metre butterfly at the 2001 FINA World Championships
- Dates: 27 July 2001 (heats, semifinals); 28 July 2001 (final)
- Competitors: 37
- Winning time: 58.27 seconds

Medalists
| gold medal | Petria Thomas | Australia |
| silver medal | Otylia Jędrzejczak | Poland |
| bronze medal | Junko Onishi | Japan |

The women's 100 metre butterfly event at the 2001 World Aquatics Championships took place 28 July. The heats and semifinals took place 27 July, with the final being held on 28 July.

== Records ==
Prior to this competition, the existing world and competition records were as follows:

| World record | Inge de Bruijn (NED) | 56.61 | Sydney, Australia | 17 September 2000 |
| Championship record | Jenny Thompson (USA) | 58.46 | Perth, Australia | 15 January 1998 |

The following record was established during the competition:

| Date | Round | Name | Nationality | Time | Record |
|---|---|---|---|---|---|
| 28 July | Final | Petria Thomas | Australia | 58.27 | CR |

== Results ==
=== Heats ===
| Rank | Name | Nationality | Time | Notes |
|---|---|---|---|---|
| 1 | Petria Thomas | Australia | 58.53 | Q |
| 2 | Otylia Jędrzejczak | Poland | 59.24 | Q |
| 3 | Junko Onishi | Japan | 59.30 | Q |
| 4 | Mary Descenza | United States | 59.73 | Q |
| 5 | Natalia Soutiaguina | Russia | 59.89 | Q |
| 6 | Vered Borochovski | Israel | 59.94 | Q |
| 7 | Irina Bespalova | Russia | 59.96 | Q |
| 8 | Shelly Ripple | United States | 1:00.12 | Q |
| 9 | Johanna Sjöberg | Sweden | 1:00.35 | Q |
| 10 | Sophia Skou | Denmark | 1:00.53 | Q |
| 11 | Fabienne Dufour | Belgium | 1:00.55 | Q |
| 12 | Mireia García | Spain | 1:00.81 | Q |
| 13 | Audrey Lacroix | Canada | 1:00.84 | Q |
| 14 | Ruan Yi | China | 1:01.00 | Q |
| 15 | Petra Zahrl | Austria | 1:01.08 | Q |
| 16 | Julia Ham | Australia | 1:01.14 | Q |
| 17 | Sara Parise | Italy | 1:01.24 | |
| 18 | Anna Kopatchenia | Belarus | 1:01.27 | |
| 19 | Angela San Juan | Spain | 1:01.56 | |
| 20 | Saori Haruguchi | Japan | 1:01.58 | |
| 21 | Jennifer Fratesi | Canada | 1:01.63 | |
| 22 | Elizabeth Van Welie | New Zealand | 1:02.69 | |
| 23 | Raquel Felgueiras | Portugal | 1:02.77 | |
| 24 | Natalia Roubina | Cyprus | 1:04.05 | |
| 25 | Christel Bouvron | Singapore | 1:04.51 | |
| 26 | Sung Yi-Chien | Chinese Taipei | 1:05.51 | |
| 27 | Ayse Tugce Diker | Turkey | 1:05.58 | |
| 28 | Mariela Solange Yepez Pallo | Ecuador | 1:05.80 | |
| 29 | Yang Chin-Kuei | Chinese Taipei | 1:06.25 | |
| 30 | Xenavee Pangelinan | Northern Mariana Islands | 1:06.66 | |
| 31 | Sharntelle McLean | Trinidad and Tobago | 1:08.20 | |
| 32 | Weng Tong Cheong | Macau | 1:09.07 | |
| 33 | Weng Lam Cheong | Macau | 1:09.87 | |
| 34 | Nicole Hayes | Palau | 1:10.51 | |
| 35 | Khadisa Ciss | Senegal | 1:13.08 | |
| 36 | Xenia Peni | Papua New Guinea | 1:14.21 | |
| 37 | Amanda Onyango | Kenya | 1:21.30 | |
| – | Anna-Karin Kammerling | Sweden | DNS | |
| – | Martina Moravcová | Slovakia | DNS | |
| – | Inge de Bruijn | Netherlands | DNS | |

=== Semifinals ===
| Rank | Name | Nationality | Time | Notes |
|---|---|---|---|---|
| 1 | Petria Thomas | Australia | 58.59 | Q |
| 2 | Otylia Jędrzejczak | Poland | 58.73 | Q |
| 3 | Junko Onishi | Japan | 59.21 | Q |
| 4 | Mary Descenza | United States | 59.38 | Q |
| 5 | Vered Borochovski | Israel | 59.63 | Q |
| 6 | Johanna Sjöberg | Sweden | 59.82 | Q |
| 7 | Natalia Soutiaguina | Russia | 59.89 | Q |
| 8 | Shelly Ripple | United States | 59.96 | Q |
| 9 | Sophia Skou | Denmark | 1:00.15 | |
| 10 | Audrey Lacroix | Canada | 1:00.20 | |
| 11 | Irina Bespalova | Russia | 1:00.37 | |
| 12 | Mireia García | Spain | 1:00.46 | |
| 13 | Julia Ham | Australia | 1:00.62 | |
| 14 | Ruan Yi | China | 1:00.67 | |
| 15 | Petra Zahrl | Austria | 1:00.80 | |
| 16 | Fabienne Dufour | Belgium | 1:01.02 | |

=== Final ===
| Rank | Name | Nationality | Time | Notes |
|---|---|---|---|---|
| 1st place, gold medalist(s) | Petria Thomas | Australia | 58.27 | CR |
| 2nd place, silver medalist(s) | Otylia Jędrzejczak | Poland | 58.72 | |
| 3rd place, bronze medalist(s) | Junko Onishi | Japan | 58.88 | |
| 4 | Mary Descenza | United States | 59.30 | |
| 5 | Johanna Sjöberg | Sweden | 59.43 | |
| 6 | Shelly Ripple | United States | 59.67 | |
| 7 | Vered Borochovski | Israel | 59.75 | |
| 8 | Natalia Soutiaguina | Russia | 1:00.00 | |
