= Swimming at the 2001 World Aquatics Championships – Women's 200 metre butterfly =

Women's 200 metre butterfly at the 2001 FINA World Championships
- Dates: 22 July 2001 (heats, semifinals); 23 July 2001 (final)
- Competitors: 30
- Winning time: 2 minutes 6.73 seconds

Medalists
gold medal	Petria Thomas	Australia
silver medal	Annika Mehlhorn	Germany
bronze medal	Kaitlin Sandeno	United States

The women's 200 metre butterfly event at the 2001 World Aquatics Championships took place 23 July. The heats and semifinals took place 22 July, with the final being held on 23 July.

== Records ==
Prior to this competition, the existing world and competition records were as follows:

World record	Susie O'Neill (AUS)	2:05.81	Sydney, Australia	17 May 2000
Championship record	Liu Limin (CHN)	2:07.25	Rome, Italy	11 September 1994

The following record was established during the competition:

Date	Round	Name	Nation	Time	Record
23 July	Final	Petria Thomas	Australia	2:06.73	CR

== Results ==
=== Heats ===
Rank	Name	Nationality	Time	Notes
1	Petria Thomas	Australia	2:07.91	Q
2	Annika Mehlhorn	Germany	2:08.37	Q
3	Jessica Deglau	Canada	2:10.75	Q
4	Kaitlin Sandeno	United States	2:10.87	Q
5	Éva Risztov	Hungary	2:11.07	Q
6	Mireia García	Spain	2:11.15	Q
7	Mette Jacobsen	Denmark	2:11.27	Q
8	Yuko Nakanishi	Japan	2:11.45	Q
9	Georgina Lee	United Kingdom	2:11.61	Q
10	Shelly Ripple	United States	2:11.76	Q
11	Elizabeth Van Welie	New Zealand	2:11.87	Q
12	Asako Kitada	Japan	2:12.03	Q
13	Petra Zahrl	Austria	2:12.25	Q
14	Sophia Skou	Denmark	2:12.35	Q
15	Audrey Lacroix	Canada	2:12.94	Q
16	Irina Bespalova	Russia	2:13.65	Q
17	Vered Borochovski	Israel	2:14.24	
18	Nicole Hunter	Australia	2:14.69	
19	Ruan Yi	China	2:15.73	
20	Miriana Bosevska	North Macedonia	2:18.24	
21	Christel Bouvron	Singapore	2:19.27	
22	Anna Kopatchenia	Belarus	2:19.33	
23	Mariela Solange Yepez Pallo	Ecuador	2:19.81	
24	Natalia Roubina	Cyprus	2:19.90	
25	Yang Chin-Kuei	Chinese Taipei	2:24.77	
26	Xenavee Pangelinan	Northern Mariana Islands	2:25.48	
27	Sung Yi-Chien	Chinese Taipei	2:29.41	
–	Raquel Felgueiras	Portugal	DSQ	
–	Otylia Yedrzejczak	Poland	DSQ	
–	Natallia Baranouskaya	Belarus	DSQ	

=== Semifinals ===
Rank	Name	Nationality	Time	Notes
1	Annika Mehlhorn	Germany	2:08.95	Q
2	Petria Thomas	Australia	2:09.20	Q
3	Yuko Nakanishi	Japan	2:09.79	Q
4	Éva Risztov	Hungary	2:09.91	Q
5	Mireia García	Spain	2:09.97	Q
6	Mette Jacobsen	Denmark	2:10.43	Q
7	Shelly Ripple	United States	2:10.62	Q
8	Kaitlin Sandeno	United States	2:10.65	Q
9	Jessica Deglau	Canada	2:11.03	
10	Georgina Lee	United Kingdom	2:11.07	
11	Sophia Skou	Denmark	2:11.68	
12	Petra Zahrl	Austria	2:12.09	
13	Irina Bespalova	Russia	2:12.58	
14	Asako Kitada	Japan	2:13.05	
15	Audrey Lacroix	Canada	2:13.10	
16	Elizabeth Van Welie	New Zealand	2:13.29	

=== Final ===
Rank	Name	Nationality	Time	Notes
1st place, gold medalist(s)	Petria Thomas	Australia	2:06.73	CR
2nd place, silver medalist(s)	Annika Mehlhorn	Germany	2:06.97	
3rd place, bronze medalist(s)	Kaitlin Sandeno	United States	2:08.52	
4	Yuko Nakanishi	Japan	2:09.08	
5	Mette Jacobsen	Denmark	2:09.57	
6	Éva Risztov	Hungary	2:10.11	
7	Mireia García	Spain	2:10.42	
8	Shelly Ripple	United States	2:11.09	
