= Swimming at the 2004 Summer Olympics – Women's 200 metre butterfly =

Women's 200 metre butterfly at the Games of the XXVIII Olympiad
- Venue: Athens Olympic Aquatic Centre
- Date: August 17, 2004 (heats & semifinals); August 18, 2004 (final)
- Competitors: 32 from 26 nations
- Winning time: 2:06.05

Medalists
1st place, gold medalist(s)		Otylia Jędrzejczak	Poland
2nd place, silver medalist(s)		Petria Thomas	Australia
3rd place, bronze medalist(s)		Yuko Nakanishi	Japan

The women's 200 metre butterfly event at the 2004 Olympic Games was contested at the Olympic Aquatic Centre of the Athens Olympic Sports Complex in Athens, Greece on August 17 and 18.

Polish swimmer and world record holder Otylia Jędrzejczak added gold to her two silver medals by a storming victory in this event, and by becoming the nation's first ever swimming champion, in an outstanding time of 2:06.05. Three-time Olympian Petria Thomas of Australia managed to repeat her silver from Atlanta, lowering her time to 2:06.36. Japan's Yuko Nakanishi, on the other hand, took home the bronze at 2:08.04.

== Records ==
Prior to this competition, the existing world and Olympic records were as follows.

World record	Otylia Jędrzejczak (POL)	2:05.78	Berlin, Germany	4 August 2002
Olympic record	Misty Hyman (USA)	2:05.88	Sydney, Australia	20 September 2000

== Results ==
=== Heats ===
Rank	Heat	Lane	Name	Nationality	Time	Notes
1	4	4	Otylia Jędrzejczak	Poland	2:09.64	Q
2	4	5	Yuko Nakanishi	Japan	2:10.04	Q
3	2	4	Éva Risztov	Hungary	2:10.49	Q
4	4	3	Kaitlin Sandeno	United States	2:10.50	Q
5	3	4	Petria Thomas	Australia	2:10.87	Q
6	2	3	Georgina Lee	Great Britain	2:10.99	Q
7	3	5	Felicity Galvez	Australia	2:11.17	Q
8	4	2	Yukiko Osada	Japan	2:11.20	Q
9	3	6	Francesca Segat	Italy	2:11.40	Q
10	4	1	María Peláez	Spain	2:11.66	Q
11	3	1	Li Jie	China	2:11.77	Q
12	2	5	Dana Kirk	United States	2:11.96	Q
13	4	6	Mette Jacobsen	Denmark	2:11.99	Q
14	2	6	Annika Mehlhorn	Germany	2:12.25	Q
15	3	7	Aurore Mongel	France	2:12.26	Q
16	3	3	Paola Cavallino	Italy	2:12.34	Q
17	2	7	Beatrix Boulsevicz	Hungary	2:12.54	
18	1	5	Maria Bulakhova	Russia	2:12.99	
19	3	2	Roser Vives	Spain	2:13.02	
20	2	8	Raquel Felgueiras	Portugal	2:13.08	
21	4	8	Georgina Bardach	Argentina	2:13.68	
22	4	7	Vasiliki Angelopoulou	Greece	2:13.88	
23	2	2	Petra Zahrl	Austria	2:13.92	
24	2	1	Kwon You-ri	South Korea	2:14.30	
25	1	3	Cheng Wan-jung	Chinese Taipei	2:16.25	
26	3	8	Vesna Stojanovska	Macedonia	2:16.51	
27	1	2	Nataliya Samorodina	Ukraine	2:17.15	
28	1	4	Anja Klinar	Slovenia	2:18.15	
29	1	6	Chan Wing Suet	Hong Kong	2:18.45	
30	1	1	Heather Roffey	Cayman Islands	2:19.34	
31	1	7	Gülşah Günenç	Turkey	2:20.17	
32	1	8	Christel Bouvron	Singapore	2:26.21	

=== Semifinals ===
==== Semifinal 1 ====
Rank	Lane	Name	Nationality	Time	Notes
1	5	Kaitlin Sandeno	United States	2:08.77	Q
2	4	Yuko Nakanishi	Japan	2:08.83	Q
3	8	Paola Cavallino	Italy	2:10.23	Q
4	7	Dana Kirk	United States	2:10.69	
5	3	Georgina Lee	Great Britain	2:10.93	
6	6	Yukiko Osada	Japan	2:11.35	
7	1	Annika Mehlhorn	Germany	2:11.37	
8	2	María Peláez	Spain	2:12.54	

==== Semifinal 2 ====
Rank	Lane	Name	Nationality	Time	Notes
1	4	Otylia Jędrzejczak	Poland	2:08.84	Q
2	3	Petria Thomas	Australia	2:09.24	Q
3	6	Felicity Galvez	Australia	2:09.54	Q
4	5	Éva Risztov	Hungary	2:09.83	Q
5	1	Mette Jacobsen	Denmark	2:10.47	Q
6	8	Aurore Mongel	France	2:11.13	
7	2	Francesca Segat	Italy	2:11.18	
8	7	Li Jie	China	2:13.41	

=== Final ===
Rank	Lane	Swimmer	Nation	Time	Notes
1st place, gold medalist(s)	3	Otylia Jędrzejczak	Poland	2:06.05	
2nd place, silver medalist(s)	6	Petria Thomas	Australia	2:06.36	
3rd place, bronze medalist(s)	5	Yuko Nakanishi	Japan	2:08.04	
4	4	Kaitlin Sandeno	United States	2:08.18	
5	2	Felicity Galvez	Australia	2:09.28	
6	8	Mette Jacobsen	Denmark	2:10.01	
7	1	Paola Cavallino	Italy	2:10.14	
8	7	Éva Risztov	Hungary	2:10.58	
