= 1993 FINA World Swimming Championships (25 m) – Women's 200 metre butterfly =

These are the official results of the Women's 200 metres Butterfly event at the 1993 FINA Short Course World Championships held in Palma de Mallorca, Spain.

== Finals ==
RANK	FINAL A	TIME
	Liu Limin (CHN)	2:08.51
	Susie O'Neill (AUS)	2:09.08
	Petria Thomas (AUS)	2:09.40
4.	Yun Qu (CHN)	2:10.29
5.	Cécile Jeanson (FRA)	2:11.66
6.	Bárbara Franco (ESP)	2:12.04
7.	Mika Haruna (JPN)	2:12.16
8.	Sarah Evanetz (CAN)	2:16.28

== Qualifying heats ==
RANK	HEATS RANKING	TIME
1.	Susie O'Neill (AUS)	2:11.01
2.	Petria Thomas (AUS)	2:11.35
3.	Liu Limin (CHN)	2:12.43
4.	Sarah Evanetz (CAN)	2:12.73
5.	Yun Qu (CHN)	2:12.74
6.	Bárbara Franco (ESP)	2:12.76
7.	Cécile Jeanson (FRA)	2:12.92
8.	Mika Haruna (JPN)	2:12.96

== See also ==
- 1992 Women's Olympic Games 200m Butterfly
- 1993 Women's European LC Championships 200m Butterfly
