= Swimming at the 2000 Summer Olympics – Women's 200 metre butterfly =

Women's 200 metre butterfly at the Games of the XXVII Olympiad
- Venue: Sydney International Aquatic Centre
- Date: September 19, 2000 (heats & semifinals); September 20, 2000 (final)
- Competitors: 36 from 27 nations
- Winning time: 2:05.88 OR

Medalists
1st place, gold medalist(s)		Misty Hyman	United States
2nd place, silver medalist(s)		Susie O'Neill	Australia
3rd place, bronze medalist(s)		Petria Thomas	Australia

The women's 200 metre butterfly event at the 2000 Summer Olympics took place on 19–20 September at the Sydney International Aquatic Centre in Sydney, Australia.

U.S. swimmer Misty Hyman stunned Australia's defending champion Susie O'Neill to claim the Olympic title in front of a raucous home crowd. Seen as almost a lock victory for O'Neill, Hyman seized off a powerful lead and held a full body length over the champion at the 150-metre turn to maintain her relentless pace and touch the wall first in one of the oldest Olympic records in the book. She improved a sterling lifetime best of 2:05.88 to erase Mary T. Meagher's 1984 record by 1.02 seconds, but her time was just a 0.07-margin closer to O'Neill's world record. In a signature race, O'Neill ended up with only a silver in 2:06.58, adding it to her gold from Atlanta in 1996 and bronze from Barcelona in 1992. Meanwhile, Petria Thomas took home the bronze in 2:07.12, handing the entire medal lock for the Aussies with a two–three finish.

Danish star Mette Jacobsen, competing in her fourth Olympics, finished off the podium by over a second in 2:08.24, while Poland's Otylia Jędrzejczak posted a fifth-place time of 2:08.48. Racing next to her teammate Hyman in lane seven, Kaitlin Sandeno picked up a sixth spot with a time of 2:08.81. Japanese duo Yuko Nakanishi (2:09.66) and Maki Mita (2:10.72) closed out the field.

== Records ==
Prior to this competition, the existing world and Olympic records were as follows.

World record	Susie O'Neill (AUS)	2:05.81	Sydney, Australia	17 May 2000
Olympic record	Mary T. Meagher (USA)	2:06.90	Los Angeles, United States	4 August 1984

The following new world and Olympic records were set during this competition.

Date	Event	Name	Nationality	Time	Record
20 September	Final	Misty Hyman	United States	2:05.88	OR

== Results ==
=== Heats ===
Rank	Heat	Lane	Name	Nationality	Time	Notes
1	3	5	Misty Hyman	United States	2:07.87	Q
2	5	4	Susie O'Neill	Australia	2:07.97	Q
3	4	4	Petria Thomas	Australia	2:08.70	Q
3	4	5	Otylia Jędrzejczak	Poland	2:08.70	Q
5	3	4	Mette Jacobsen	Denmark	2:09.30	Q
6	5	5	Maki Mita	Japan	2:09.85	Q
7	5	3	Kaitlin Sandeno	United States	2:09.92	Q
8	3	3	Yuko Nakanishi	Japan	2:10.22	Q
9	2	3	Cécile Jeanson	France	2:10.78	Q, NR
10	5	6	Mireia García	Spain	2:10.96	Q
11	3	2	Georgina Lee	Great Britain	2:11.09	Q
12	4	2	Éva Risztov	Hungary	2:11.32	Q
13	5	2	Sophia Skou	Denmark	2:11.35	Q
14	4	7	Mandy Loots	South Africa	2:11.38	Q, AF
15	4	6	Margaretha Pedder	Great Britain	2:11.59	Q
16	3	8	Elizabeth van Welie	New Zealand	2:11.62	Q, NR
17	3	7	Jen Button	Canada	2:11.74	
18	3	1	Yekaterina Vinogradova	Russia	2:11.94	
19	4	1	Liu Limin	China	2:12.32	
20	2	1	Mirjana Boševska	Macedonia	2:12.59	NR
21	5	1	Liu Yin	China	2:12.79	
22	4	3	Jessica Deglau	Canada	2:12.86	
23	2	4	Petra Zahrl	Austria	2:13.29	NR
24	2	5	Zhanna Lozumyrska	Ukraine	2:14.47	
25	5	7	María Peláez	Spain	2:14.66	
26	5	8	Anna Uryniuk	Poland	2:14.87	
27	2	6	Raquel Felgueiras	Portugal	2:15.19	
28	3	6	Franziska van Almsick	Germany	2:15.68	
29	4	8	Hsieh Shu-tzu	Chinese Taipei	2:16.23	
30	2	7	Natalia Roubina	Cyprus	2:17.01	
31	2	2	Zampia Melachroinou	Greece	2:17.60	
32	2	8	Christel Bouvron	Singapore	2:17.62	
33	1	3	Chan Wing Suet	Hong Kong	2:19.86	
34	1	5	Tinka Dančević	Croatia	2:21.02	
35	1	4	Ana Carolina Aguilera	Argentina	2:21.23	
36	1	6	Hana Majaj	Jordan	2:31.78	

=== Semifinals ===
==== Semifinal 1 ====
Rank	Lane	Name	Nationality	Time	Notes
1	4	Susie O'Neill	Australia	2:07.57	Q
2	5	Petria Thomas	Australia	2:07.63	Q
3	3	Maki Mita	Japan	2:09.88	Q
4	6	Yuko Nakanishi	Japan	2:09.89	Q
5	2	Mireia García	Spain	2:10.24	
6	1	Mandy Loots	South Africa	2:10.58	AF
7	8	Elizabeth van Welie	New Zealand	2:11.68	
8	7	Éva Risztov	Hungary	2:11.83	

==== Semifinal 2 ====
Rank	Lane	Name	Nationality	Time	Notes
1	5	Otylia Jędrzejczak	Poland	2:07.81	Q, EU
2	4	Misty Hyman	United States	2:07.96	Q
3	3	Mette Jacobsen	Denmark	2:08.11	Q, NR
4	6	Kaitlin Sandeno	United States	2:09.40	Q
5	7	Georgina Lee	Great Britain	2:10.33	NR
6	8	Margaretha Pedder	Great Britain	2:10.49	
7	2	Cécile Jeanson	France	2:10.78	=NR
8	1	Sophia Skou	Denmark	2:11.07	

=== Final ===
Rank	Lane	Name	Nationality	Time	Notes
1st place, gold medalist(s)	6	Misty Hyman	United States	2:05.88	OR*
2nd place, silver medalist(s)	4	Susie O'Neill	Australia	2:06.58	
3rd place, bronze medalist(s)	5	Petria Thomas	Australia	2:07.12	
4	2	Mette Jacobsen	Denmark	2:08.24	
5	3	Otylia Jędrzejczak	Poland	2:08.48	
6	7	Kaitlin Sandeno	United States	2:08.81	
7	8	Yuko Nakanishi	Japan	2:09.66	
8	1	Maki Mita	Japan	2:10.72	

* Also an American record.
