= Swimming at the 1992 Summer Olympics – Women's 200 metre butterfly =

Women's 200 metre butterfly at the Games of the XXV Olympiad
- Venue: Piscines Bernat Picornell
- Date: 31 July 1992 (heats & finals)
- Competitors: 34 from 24 nations
- Winning time: 2:08.67

Medalists
1st place, gold medalist(s)		Summer Sanders	United States
2nd place, silver medalist(s)		Wang Xiaohong	China
3rd place, bronze medalist(s)		Susie O'Neill	Australia

The women's 200 metre butterfly event at the 1992 Summer Olympics took place on 31 July at the Piscines Bernat Picornell in Barcelona, Spain.

== Records ==
Prior to this competition, the existing world and Olympic records were as follows.

World record	Mary T. Meagher (USA)	2:05.96	Brown Deer, United States	13 August 1981
Olympic record	Mary T. Meagher (USA)	2:06.90	Los Angeles, United States	4 August 1984

== Results ==
=== Heats ===
Rule: The eight fastest swimmers advance to final A (Q), while the next eight to final B (q).

Rank	Heat	Lane	Name	Nationality	Time	Notes
1	5	5	Susie O'Neill	Australia	2:10.47	Q
2	5	4	Summer Sanders	United States	2:10.58	Q
3	3	4	Rie Shito	Japan	2:11.00	Q
4	4	5	Mika Haruna	Japan	2:11.21	Q
5	4	4	Wang Xiaohong	China	2:11.83	Q
6	4	3	Angie Wester-Krieg	United States	2:12.00	Q
7	5	6	Ilaria Tocchini	Italy	2:13.03	Q
8	3	5	Mette Jacobsen	Denmark	2:13.18	Q
9	3	3	Cécile Jeanson	France	2:13.23	q
10	5	3	Hayley Lewis	Australia	2:14.50	q
11	4	7	Ewa Synowska	Poland	2:14.58	q, NR
12	2	4	Anna Uryniuk	Poland	2:14.91	q
13	4	6	Samantha Purvis	Great Britain	2:15.04	q
14	3	7	Iuliana Pantelimon	Romania	2:15.44	q
15	3	6	María Peláez	Spain	2:15.77	q
16	5	2	Berit Puggaard	Denmark	2:16.11	q
17	3	1	María Luisa Fernández	Spain	2:16.18	
18	5	1	Nataša Meškovska	Independent Olympic Participants	2:16.54	
19	4	8	Joana Arantes	Portugal	2:16.56	
20	4	1	Timea Toth	Israel	2:16.84	
21	5	7	Corina Dumitru	Romania	2:16.86	
22	4	2	Nataliya Yakovleva	Unified Team	2:19.02	
23	3	2	Jacinthe Pineau	Canada	2:19.44	
24	2	3	Helen Slatter	Great Britain	2:20.45	
25	1	5	Praphalsai Minpraphal	Thailand	2:20.48	
26	1	4	Bettina Ustrowski	Germany	2:21.49	
27	1	2	Anja Margetić	Bosnia and Herzegovina	2:21.56	
28	2	2	Blanca Morales	Guatemala	2:21.97	
29	5	8	Qian Hong	China	2:22.77	
30	2	5	Shelley Cramer	Virgin Islands	2:25.24	
31	1	6	Claudia Fortin	Honduras	2:26.92	
32	1	3	May Ooi	Singapore	2:26.97	
	2	6	Jeanine Steenkamp	South Africa	DNS	
	3	8	Brigitte Becue	Belgium	DNS	

=== Finals ===
==== Final B ====
Rank	Lane	Name	Nationality	Time	Notes
9	5	Hayley Lewis	Australia	2:13.11	
10	4	Cécile Jeanson	France	2:13.40	
11	3	Ewa Synowska	Poland	2:13.61	NR
12	6	Anna Uryniuk	Poland	2:14.44	
13	2	Samantha Purvis	Great Britain	2:14.47	
14	7	Iuliana Pantelimon	Romania	2:14.95	
15	8	Berit Puggaard	Denmark	2:15.07	
15	1	María Peláez	Spain	2:15.07	

==== Final A ====
Rank	Lane	Name	Nationality	Time	Notes
1st place, gold medalist(s)	5	Summer Sanders	United States	2:08.67	
2nd place, silver medalist(s)	2	Wang Xiaohong	China	2:09.01	AS
3rd place, bronze medalist(s)	4	Susie O'Neill	Australia	2:09.03	OC
4	6	Mika Haruna	Japan	2:09.88	NR
5	3	Rie Shito	Japan	2:10.24	
6	7	Angie Wester-Krieg	United States	2:11.46	
7	8	Mette Jacobsen	Denmark	2:11.87	NR
8	1	Ilaria Tocchini	Italy	2:13.78	
