= Swimming at the 1996 Summer Olympics – Women's 200 metre butterfly =

Women's 200 metre butterfly at the Games of the XXVI Olympiad
- Venue: Georgia Tech Aquatic Center
- Date: 26 July 1996 (heats & finals)
- Competitors: 35 from 29 nations
- Winning time: 2:07.76

Medalists
1st place, gold medalist(s)		Susie O'Neill	Australia
2nd place, silver medalist(s)		Petria Thomas	Australia
3rd place, bronze medalist(s)		Michelle Smith	Ireland

The women's 200 metre butterfly event at the 1996 Summer Olympics took place on 26 July at the Georgia Tech Aquatic Center in Atlanta, United States.

== Records ==
Prior to this competition, the existing world and Olympic records were as follows.

World record	Mary T. Meagher (USA)	2:05.96	Brown Deer, United States	13 August 1981
Olympic record	Mary T. Meagher (USA)	2:06.90	Los Angeles, United States	4 August 1984

== Results ==
=== Heats ===
Rule: The eight fastest swimmers advance to final A (Q), while the next eight to final B (q).

Rank	Heat	Lane	Name	Nationality	Time	Notes
1	5	4	Susie O'Neill	Australia	2:09.46	Q
2	5	3	Michelle Smith	Ireland	2:10.03	Q, NR
3	3	3	Petria Thomas	Australia	2:10.64	Q
4	3	4	Qu Yun	China	2:11.35	Q
5	3	6	Jessica Deglau	Canada	2:12.48	Q
6	4	5	Mika Haruna	Japan	2:12.59	Q
7	3	5	Trina Jackson	United States	2:12.69	Q
8	5	5	Liu Limin	China	2:13.12	Q
9	5	2	Andrea Schwartz	Canada	2:13.33	q
10	5	7	Bárbara Franco	Spain	2:13.34	q
11	4	2	Cécile Jeanson	France	2:13.58	q
12	3	2	Sophia Skou	Denmark	2:13.59	q
13	4	7	María Peláez	Spain	2:13.85	q
14	4	6	Anna Uryniuk	Poland	2:13.90	q
15	5	6	Annette Salmeen	United States	2:14.69	q
16	4	4	Hitomi Kashima	Japan	2:16.04	q
17	3	7	Ilaria Tocchini	Italy	2:16.10	
18	4	1	Hsieh Shu-tzu	Chinese Taipei	2:16.27	
19	4	8	Sabine Herbst	Germany	2:16.66	
20	2	6	Nataliya Zolotukhina	Ukraine	2:16.68	NR
21	5	1	Loredana Zisu	Romania	2:17.56	
22	3	1	Ana Francisco	Portugal	2:17.61	
23	2	5	Nataša Meškovska	Macedonia	2:17.90	
23	3	8	Edit Klocker	Hungary	2:17.90	
25	5	8	Praphalsai Minpraphal	Thailand	2:18.19	
26	2	8	Nida Zuhal	Turkey	2:18.46	NR
27	2	4	Marcela Kubalčíková	Czech Republic	2:19.38	
28	2	2	María del Pilar Pereyra	Argentina	2:19.57	
29	2	3	Marina Karystinou	Greece	2:20.57	
30	2	1	Mandy Loots	South Africa	2:20.73	
31	2	7	Tinka Dančević	Croatia	2:20.74	
32	1	4	Park Woo-hee	South Korea	2:22.99	
33	1	5	Melissa Mata	Costa Rica	2:23.89	
34	1	3	Sonia Álvarez	Puerto Rico	2:25.24	
	4	3	Mette Jacobsen	Denmark	DNS	

=== Finals ===
==== Final B ====
Rank	Lane	Name	Nationality	Time	Notes
9	6	Sophia Skou	Denmark	2:12.41	
10	3	Cécile Jeanson	France	2:12.99	
11	2	María Peláez	Spain	2:13.05	
12	1	Annette Salmeen	United States	2:13.64	
12	7	Anna Uryniuk	Poland	2:13.64	
14	8	Hitomi Kashima	Japan	2:13.97	
15	4	Andrea Schwartz	Canada	2:14.07	
16	5	Bárbara Franco	Spain	2:14.16	

==== Final A ====
Rank	Lane	Name	Nationality	Time	Notes
1st place, gold medalist(s)	4	Susie O'Neill	Australia	2:07.76	
2nd place, silver medalist(s)	3	Petria Thomas	Australia	2:09.82	
3rd place, bronze medalist(s)	5	Michelle Smith	Ireland	2:09.91	NR
4	6	Qu Yun	China	2:10.26	
5	8	Liu Limin	China	2:10.70	
6	2	Jessica Deglau	Canada	2:11.40	
7	7	Mika Haruna	Japan	2:11.93	
8	1	Trina Jackson	United States	2:11.96	
