= Swimming at the 2000 Summer Olympics – Women's 100 metre butterfly =

Women's 100 metre butterfly at the Games of the XXVII Olympiad
- Venue: Sydney International Aquatic Centre
- Date: September 16, 2000 (heats & semifinals); September 17, 2000 (final)
- Competitors: 50 from 40 nations
- Winning time: 56.61 WR

Medalists
1st place, gold medalist(s)		Inge de Bruijn	Netherlands
2nd place, silver medalist(s)		Martina Moravcová	Slovakia
3rd place, bronze medalist(s)		Dara Torres	United States

The women's 100 metre butterfly event at the 2000 Summer Olympics took place on 16–17 September at the Sydney International Aquatic Centre in Sydney, Australia.

Dutch rising star Inge de Bruijn broke her own world record by 0.03 seconds to claim the gold medal in the event. Forging a narrow lead at the initial turn, she cruised her path on the final lap to hit the wall first in a sterling time of 56.61. Slovakia's Martina Moravcová moved herself up from fourth to surge past the field for the silver medal in 57.97. At only 33 years of age and competing in her fourth Olympics since 1984, U.S. legend Dara Torres ended her seven-year retirement from the sport by taking home the bronze in 58.20.

Australia's top favorite Petria Thomas failed to impress the home crowd with her fourth-place effort, finishing off the podium by 29-hundredths of a second in 58.49. Trailing behind De Bruijn by 0.12 seconds, Jenny Thompson faded down the final stretch to pick up a fifth spot in 58.73. Earlier in the prelims, she posted a leading time (57.66) to cut off Qian Hong's 1992 Olympic record by almost a full second. Japan's Junko Onishi (59.13), Thomas' teammate Susie O'Neill (59.27), competing in her third Olympics, and Romania's Diana Mocanu (59.43) rounded out the finale.

Before her breakthrough final, De Bruijn erased Thompson's record from heat five by 0.06 seconds to post a top-seeded time of 57.60 in the prelims. Followed by an evening session on the first night of the Games, she eventually lowered it to 57.14 in the semifinals.

== Records ==
Prior to this competition, the existing world and Olympic records were as follows.

World record	Inge de Bruijn (NED)	56.64	Seattle, United States	22 July 2000
Olympic record	Qian Hong (CHN)	58.62	Barcelona, Spain	29 July 1992

The following new world and Olympic records were set during this competition.

Date	Event	Name	Nationality	Time	Record
16 September	Heat 5	Jenny Thompson	United States	57.66	OR
16 September	Heat 7	Inge de Bruijn	Netherlands	57.60	OR
16 September	Semifinal 2	Inge de Bruijn	Netherlands	57.14	OR
17 September	Final	Inge de Bruijn	Netherlands	56.61	WR

== Results ==
=== Heats ===
Rank	Heat	Lane	Name	Nationality	Time	Notes
1	7	4	Inge de Bruijn	Netherlands	57.60	Q, OR
2	5	4	Jenny Thompson	United States	57.66	Q, AM
3	7	5	Petria Thomas	Australia	58.52	Q
4	7	3	Otylia Jędrzejczak	Poland	58.66	Q, NR
5	6	4	Dara Torres	United States	58.76	Q
6	6	5	Martina Moravcová	Slovakia	58.95	Q
7	5	3	Junko Onishi	Japan	59.11	Q
8	6	6	Mette Jacobsen	Denmark	59.45	Q
9	5	5	Susie O'Neill	Australia	59.49	Q
10	7	8	Natalya Sutyagina	Russia	59.50	Q, NR
11	6	3	Johanna Sjöberg	Sweden	59.59	Q
12	5	7	Franziska van Almsick	Germany	59.72	Q, WD
12	6	7	Diana Mocanu	Romania	59.72	Q, NR
14	4	3	Sophia Skou	Denmark	59.79	Q
15	5	6	Anna-Karin Kammerling	Sweden	59.88	Q
16	7	7	Mandy Loots	South Africa	59.94	Q, AF
17	6	1	Cécile Jeanson	France	59.96	Q
18	6	2	Liu Limin	China	59.98	
19	7	2	Vered Borochovski	Israel	1:00.34	
20	4	4	Jen Button	Canada	1:00.83	
21	5	8	Jessica Deglau	Canada	1:00.97	
21	7	6	Maki Mita	Japan	1:00.97	
23	4	7	Fabienne Dufour	Belgium	1:01.15	
23	4	8	Orsolya Ferenczy	Hungary	1:01.15	
25	7	1	Ruan Yi	China	1:01.16	
26	6	8	Joscelin Yeo	Singapore	1:01.28	
27	5	2	Daniela Samulski	Germany	1:01.31	
28	4	6	Renate du Plessis	South Africa	1:01.32	
29	4	5	María Peláez	Spain	1:01.47	
30	4	2	Margaretha Pedder	Great Britain	1:01.53	
31	5	1	Yekaterina Vinogradova	Russia	1:01.54	
32	3	3	Maria Papadopoulou	Cyprus	1:01.64	NR
33	4	1	Marja Pärssinen	Finland	1:01.94	
34	3	5	Zampia Melachroinou	Greece	1:02.06	
35	3	2	Lee Bo-eun	South Korea	1:02.22	
36	3	8	Fabíola Molina	Brazil	1:02.77	
37	3	4	Praphalsai Minpraphal	Thailand	1:02.99	
38	3	6	Mariya Ogurtsova	Ukraine	1:03.00	
39	3	1	Eydis Konráðsdóttir	Iceland	1:03.27	
40	3	7	Siobhan Cropper	Trinidad and Tobago	1:03.34	
41	2	4	Hsieh Shu-ting	Chinese Taipei	1:03.52	
42	2	3	Yan Kay Flora Kong	Hong Kong	1:04.09	
43	2	2	Ayse Diker	Turkey	1:04.65	
44	2	5	María del Pilar Pereyra	Argentina	1:04.75	
45	1	4	Lisa de la Motte	Swaziland	1:06.70	
46	1	3	Angela Galea	Malta	1:07.88	
47	2	7	Ellen Lendra Hight	Zambia	1:09.34	
48	2	6	Mariya Bugakova	Uzbekistan	1:09.94	
49	1	5	Tracy Ann Route	Federated States of Micronesia	1:13.53	
	2	1	Kenza Bennaceur	Algeria	DNS	

=== Semifinals ===
==== Semifinal 1 ====
Rank	Lane	Name	Nationality	Time	Notes
1	4	Jenny Thompson	United States	58.18	Q
2	3	Martina Moravcová	Slovakia	58.49	Q
3	7	Diana Mocanu	Romania	59.12	Q, NR
4	5	Otylia Jędrzejczak	Poland	59.14	
5	2	Natalya Sutyagina	Russia	59.30	
6	6	Mette Jacobsen	Denmark	59.75	
7	8	Cécile Jeanson	France	59.80	
8	1	Anna-Karin Kammerling	Sweden	1:00.40	

==== Semifinal 2 ====
Rank	Lane	Name	Nationality	Time	Notes
1	4	Inge de Bruijn	Netherlands	57.14	Q, OR
2	5	Petria Thomas	Australia	58.11	Q
3	3	Dara Torres	United States	58.35	Q
4	6	Junko Onishi	Japan	59.04	Q
5	2	Susie O'Neill	Australia	59.05	Q
6	7	Johanna Sjöberg	Sweden	59.15	
7	8	Mandy Loots	South Africa	59.63	AF
8	1	Sophia Skou	Denmark	59.89	

=== Final ===
Rank	Lane	Name	Nationality	Time	Notes
1st place, gold medalist(s)	4	Inge de Bruijn	Netherlands	56.61	WR
2nd place, silver medalist(s)	2	Martina Moravcová	Slovakia	57.97	NR
3rd place, bronze medalist(s)	6	Dara Torres	United States	58.20	
4	5	Petria Thomas	Australia	58.49	
5	3	Jenny Thompson	United States	58.73	
6	7	Junko Onishi	Japan	59.13	
7	1	Susie O'Neill	Australia	59.27	
8	8	Diana Mocanu	Romania	59.43	
