= Swimming at the 1992 Summer Olympics – Women's 100 metre butterfly =

Women's 100 metre butterfly at the Games of the XXV Olympiad
- Venue: Piscines Bernat Picornell
- Date: 29 July 1992 (heats & finals)
- Competitors: 49 from 34 nations
- Winning time: 58.62 OR

Medalists
1st place, gold medalist(s)		Qian Hong; China
2nd place, silver medalist(s)		Crissy Ahmann-Leighton; United States
3rd place, bronze medalist(s)		Catherine Plewinski; France

The women's 100 metre butterfly event at the 1992 Summer Olympics took place on 29 July at the Piscines Bernat Picornell in Barcelona, Spain.

== Records ==
Prior to this competition, the existing world and Olympic records were as follows.

World record	Mary T. Meagher (USA)	57.93	Brown Deer, United States	16 August 1981
Olympic record	Kristin Otto (GDR)	59.00	Seoul, South Korea	23 September 1988

The following records were established during the competition:

Date	Round	Name	Nationality	Time	Record
29 July	Final A	Qian Hong	China	58.62	OR

== Results ==
=== Heats ===
Rule: The eight fastest swimmers advance to final A (Q), while the next eight to final B (q).

Rank	Heat	Lane	Name	Nationality	Time	Notes
1	6	4	Wang Xiaohong	China	59.34	Q
2	7	5	Qian Hong	China	59.37	Q
3	6	5	Susie O'Neill	Australia	59.95	Q
4	5	3	Franziska van Almsick	Germany	1:00.02	Q
5	5	5	Catherine Plewinski	France	1:00.03	Q
6	7	4	Crissy Ahmann-Leighton	United States	1:00.10	Q
7	5	4	Summer Sanders	United States	1:00.38	Q
8	6	6	Rie Shito	Japan	1:01.04	Q
9	7	3	Lisa Curry	Australia	1:01.07	q
10	5	6	Inge de Bruijn	Netherlands	1:01.12	q
11	7	2	Kristin Topham	Canada	1:01.20	q
12	7	6	Karin Brienesse	Netherlands	1:01.33	q
13	6	2	Ilaria Tocchini	Italy	1:01.37	q
14	5	7	Therèse Lundin	Sweden	1:01.38	q
15	6	3	Yoko Kando	Japan	1:01.56	q
16	6	7	Jacqueline Delord	France	1:01.78	qSO*
16	7	8	Olga Kirichenko	Unified Team	1:01.78	qSO
18	5	2	Bettina Ustrowski	Germany	1:02.07	
19	4	3	Martina Moravcová	Czechoslovakia	1:02.11	
20	7	7	Madeleine Campbell	Great Britain	1:02.43	
21	4	6	Marianne Kriel	South Africa	1:02.49	
22	3	4	Anna Uryniuk	Poland	1:02.50	NR
23	4	7	Diana Ureche	Romania	1:02.72	
24	7	1	Malin Strömberg	Sweden	1:02.78	
25	5	1	María Peláez	Spain	1:02.79	
26	3	2	Bárbara Franco	Spain	1:02.83	
27	6	8	Julie Howard	Canada	1:02.89	
28	5	8	Samantha Purvis	Great Britain	1:02.94	
29	4	2	Timea Toth	Israel	1:03.18	
29	6	1	Nataliya Yakovleva	Unified Team	1:03.18	
31	2	4	Joscelin Yeo	Singapore	1:03.82	
32	4	4	Marja Pärssinen	Finland	1:03.94	
33	4	1	Iuliana Pantelimon	Romania	1:04.07	
34	2	3	May Ooi	Singapore	1:04.14	
35	3	5	Nataša Meškovska	Independent Olympic Participants	1:04.16	
36	3	6	Ana Alegria	Portugal	1:04.18	
37	2	2	Praphalsai Minpraphal	Thailand	1:04.28	
38	3	3	Berit Puggaard	Denmark	1:04.57	
39	2	6	Joana Arantes	Portugal	1:04.59	
40	3	7	Gabriela Gaja	Mexico	1:04.84	
41	2	5	Blanca Morales	Guatemala	1:05.02	
42	2	7	Nguyễn Kiều Oanh	Vietnam	1:05.19	
43	4	5	Shelley Cramer	Virgin Islands	1:05.84	
44	1	7	Anja Margetić	Bosnia and Herzegovina	1:06.26	NR
45	1	5	Sharon Pickering	Fiji	1:06.35	
46	1	4	Monica Dahl	Namibia	1:06.58	
47	1	3	Ana Joselina Fortin	Honduras	1:07.94	
48	1	6	Elsa Freire	Angola	1:10.17	
49	1	2	Mariza Gregorio	Mozambique	1:10.27	

* Delord and Kirichenko tied for sixteenth place, but the latter elected not to participate in a swimoff, allowing the former to advance to the semifinals by default.

=== Finals ===
==== Final B ====
Rank	Lane	Name	Nationality	Time	Notes
9	5	Inge de Bruijn	Netherlands	1:01.02	
10	6	Karin Brienesse	Netherlands	1:01.20	
11	1	Yoko Kando	Japan	1:01.32	
12	7	Therèse Lundin	Sweden	1:01.43	
13	4	Lisa Curry	Australia	1:01.61	
14	3	Kristin Topham	Canada	1:01.91	
15	2	Ilaria Tocchini	Italy	1:02.06	
16	8	Jacqueline Delord	France	1:03.22	

==== Final A ====
Rank	Lane	Name	Nationality	Time	Notes
1st place, gold medalist(s)	5	Qian Hong	China	58.62	OR
2nd place, silver medalist(s)	7	Crissy Ahmann-Leighton	United States	58.74	
3rd place, bronze medalist(s)	2	Catherine Plewinski	France	59.01	NR
4	4	Wang Xiaohong	China	59.10	
5	3	Susie O'Neill	Australia	59.69	OC
6	1	Summer Sanders	United States	59.82	
7	6	Franziska van Almsick	Germany	1:00.70	
8	8	Rie Shito	Japan	1:01.16	
