= Ana Carolina Aguilera =

Argentine swimmer (born 1981)

Personal information
- Full name: Ana Carolina Aguilera
- National team: Argentina
- Born: 27 May 1981 (age 45)
- Height: 1.61 m (5 ft 3 in)
- Weight: 53 kg (117 lb)

Sport
- Sport: Swimming
- Strokes: Butterfly

Ana Carolina Aguilera (born May 27, 1981) is an Argentine former swimmer, who specialized in butterfly events. Aguilera competed only in the women's 200 m butterfly at the 2000 Summer Olympics in Sydney. She achieved a FINA B-cut of 2:18.42 from the Argentina National Championships in Buenos Aires. She participated in heat one against three other swimmers Chan Wing Suet of Hong Kong, Tinka Dančević of Croatia, and Hana Majaj of Jordan. Entering the race with the fastest-seeded time, she managed to pull off a third-place effort in 2:21.23, but finished behind leader Chan by 1.37 seconds. Aguilera failed to advance into the semifinals, as she placed thirty-fifth overall in the prelims.
