= Swimming at the 2002 Asian Games – Women's 200 metre butterfly =

Women's 200 metre butterfly at the 2002 Asian Games
- Venue: Sajik Swimming Pool
- Date: 30 September 2002
- Competitors: 12 from 7 nations

Medalists
| gold medal | Yuko Nakanishi | Japan |
| silver medal | Maki Mita | Japan |
| bronze medal | Liu Yin | China |

The women's 200 metre butterfly swimming competition at the 2002 Asian Games in Busan was held on 30 September at the Sajik Swimming Pool.

== Schedule ==
All times are Korea Standard Time (UTC+09:00)

| Date | Time | Event |
|---|---|---|
| Monday, 30 September 2002 | 10:00 | Heats |
| Monday, 30 September 2002 | 19:00 | Final |

== Records ==
Prior to this competition, the existing world, Asian and Games records were as follows.

| World Record | Otylia Jędrzejczak (POL) | 2:05.78 | Berlin, Germany | 4 August 2002 |
| Asian Record | Liu Limin (CHN) | 2:06.77 | Hiroshima, Japan | 8 October 1994 |
| Games Record | Liu Limin (CHN) | 2:06.77 | Hiroshima, Japan | 8 October 1994 |

== Results ==
=== Heats ===
| Rank | Heat | Athlete | Time | Notes |
|---|---|---|---|---|
| 1 | 2 | Maki Mita (JPN) | 2:11.57 | |
| 2 | 2 | Yuko Nakanishi (JPN) | 2:11.66 | |
| 3 | 1 | Liu Yin (CHN) | 2:13.51 | |
| 4 | 1 | Li Jie (CHN) | 2:14.45 | |
| 5 | 2 | Park Kyung-hwa (KOR) | 2:17.22 | |
| 6 | 1 | Christel Bouvron (SIN) | 2:17.53 | |
| 7 | 1 | Chan Wing Suet (HKG) | 2:17.79 | |
| 8 | 2 | Shin Bo-mi (KOR) | 2:19.65 | |
| 9 | 1 | Richa Mishra (IND) | 2:22.09 | |
| 10 | 1 | Lucia Dacanay (PHI) | 2:22.36 | |
| 11 | 2 | Flora Kong (HKG) | 2:22.41 | |
| 12 | 2 | U-Nice Chan (SIN) | 2:23.60 | |

=== Final ===
| Rank | Athlete | Time | Notes |
|---|---|---|---|
| 1st place, gold medalist(s) | Yuko Nakanishi (JPN) | 2:08.99 | |
| 2nd place, silver medalist(s) | Maki Mita (JPN) | 2:11.57 | |
| 3rd place, bronze medalist(s) | Liu Yin (CHN) | 2:12.07 | |
| 4 | Li Jie (CHN) | 2:12.28 | |
| 5 | Chan Wing Suet (HKG) | 2:17.42 | |
| 6 | Park Kyung-hwa (KOR) | 2:18.22 | |
| 7 | Shin Bo-mi (KOR) | 2:19.53 | |
| 8 | Christel Bouvron (SIN) | 2:22.52 | |
