= Hana Majaj =

Jordanian swimmer

Personal information
- Full name: Hana Majaj
- National team: Jordan
- Born: 14 September 1982 (age 43) Amman, Jordan
- Height: 1.65 m (5 ft 5 in)
- Weight: 52 kg (115 lb)

Sport
- Sport: Swimming
- Strokes: Butterfly
- College team: Brigham Young University (U.S.)

Hana Majaj (Arabic: هناء مجاج; born September 14, 1982) is a Jordanian former swimmer, who specialized in butterfly events. She represented Jordan at the 2000 Summer Olympics, and also trained for the BYU Cougars swimming and diving team at Brigham Young University in Provo, Utah.

Majaj competed only in the women's 200 m butterfly at the 2000 Summer Olympics in Sydney. She received a ticket from FINA, under a Universality program, without meeting an entry time. She participated in heat one against three other swimmers Chan Wing Suet of Hong Kong, Tinka Dančević of Croatia, and Ana Carolina Aguilera of Argentina. She rounded out a small field to last place in a lifetime best of 2:31.78, the slowest of all in the heats. Majaj failed to advance into the semifinals, as she placed thirty-sixth overall in the prelims.
