= Liu Yin =

Liu Yin may refer to:

- Liu Yan (Xin dynasty) (died 23 AD), rebel leader against the Xin dynasty, name also romanized as Liu Yin
- Liu Yin (Han-Zhao) (died 329), Imperial prince of the Han Zhao state
- Liu Yin (Southern Han) (874–911), Late Tang Dynasty official and older brother of the founder of the Southern Han kingdom
- Liu Rushi (Liu Yin; 1618–1664)), Ming Dynasty Chinese female artist
- Liu Yin (curler) (born 1981), Chinese curler
- Liu Yin (swimmer) (born 1984), Chinese swimmer
