= Timea Toth (swimmer) =

Israeli swimmer

Timea Toth טימאה טוט
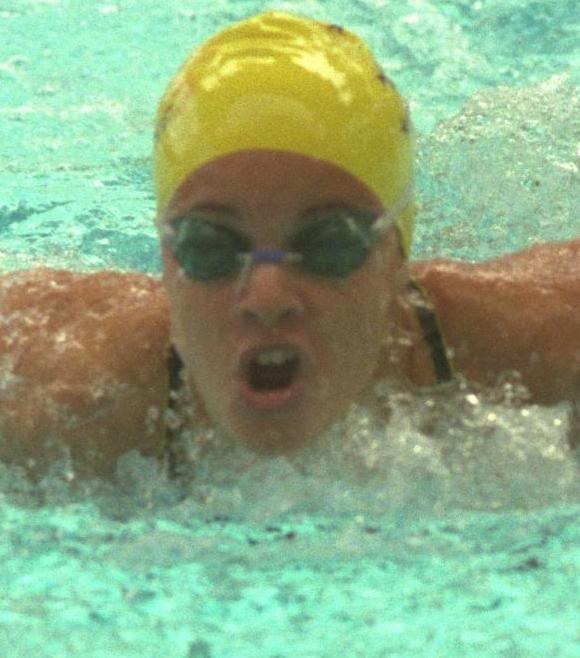

Personal information
- Nationality: Israel
- Born: February 5, 1968 (age 58)

Sport
- Sport: Swimming
- Strokes: 50 m freestyle 200 m medley 400 m medley

Timea Toth (Hebrew: טימאה טוט; born February 2, 1968) is an Israeli former Olympic swimmer.

She is a former member of the Romanian national team, and immigrated to Israel from Romania in 1990.

Toth competed for Israel at the 1992 Summer Olympics in Barcelona, Spain, at the age of 24. In the Women's 200 metre Butterfly she came in 20th with a time of 2:16.84, and in the Women's 100 metre Butterfly she came in tied for 29th with a time of 1:03.18.
