= Swimming at the 1997 European Aquatics Championships – Women's 100 metre butterfly =

The final of the Women's 100 metres butterfly event at the European LC Championships 1997 was held on Friday 1997-08-22 in Seville, Spain.

== Finals ==
RANK	FINAL A	TIME
	Mette Jacobsen (DEN)	59.64
	Martina Moravcová (SVK)	59.74
	Johanna Sjöberg (SWE)	1:00.07
4.	Svetlana Pozdeyeva (RUS)	1:00.28
5.	Ilaria Tocchini (ITA)	1:00.56
6.	Anna Uryniuk (POL)	1:00.77
7.	Cécile Jeanson (FRA)	1:01.46
8.	Marja Pärssinen (FIN)	1:01.52

== See also ==
- 1996 Women's Olympic Games 100m Butterfly
- 1997 Women's World Championships (SC) 100m Butterfly
