= Anthony Howard (swimmer) =

British swimmer

Personal information
- Full name: Anthony Howard
- National team: Great Britain
- Born: 30 September 1979 (age 46) Bolton, England
- Height: 1.83 m (6 ft 0 in)
- Weight: 73 kg (161 lb; 11.5 st)

Sport
- Sport: Swimming
- Strokes: Freestyle
- Club: Bolton Metro
Medal record
Men's swimming
Representing Great Britain
European Championships (SC)
Bronze medal – third place	2000 Valencia	4×50 m freestyle
Bronze medal – third place	2005 Trieste	4×50 m freestyle
Representing England
Commonwealth Games
Bronze medal – third place	1998 Kuala Lumpur	4×100 m freestyle

Anthony Howard (born 30 September 1979) is a male English former competitive swimmer and freestyler who represented Great Britain in the Olympics and European championships, and England in the Commonwealth Games.

== Swimming career ==
Howard was part of the bronze medal-winning British 4×50-metre freestyle teams at the 2000 and 2005.

He represented Great Britain at the 2000 Olympic Games in Sydney in the men's 4×100-metre freestyle relay however the team did not progress beyond the heats.

Howard attended three Commonwealth Games representing England in 1998, 2002 and 2006. He won a bronze medal for England at the 1998 Games in Kuala Lumpur, Malaysia in the 4×100-metre freestyle relay.

== See also ==
- List of British records in swimming
