= 1997 FINA Short Course World Championships – Women's 100m butterfly =

The finals and the qualifying heats of the women's 100 metres butterfly event at the 1997 FINA Short Course World Championships were held on the third day of the competition, on Saturday 19 April 1997 in Gothenburg, Sweden.

== Finals ==
| RANK | FINAL A | TIME |
|---|---|---|
| | Jenny Thompson (USA) | 57.79 WR |
| | Huijue Cai (CHN) | 57.92 |
| | Misty Hyman (USA) | 57.95 |
| 4. | Liu Limin (CHN) | 58.26 |
| 5. | Martina Moravcová (SVK) | 58.58 ER |
| 6. | Johanna Sjöberg (SWE) | 59.02 |
| 7. | Angela Kennedy (AUS) | 59.23 |
| 8. | Louise Karlsson (SWE) | 59.44 |

| RANK | FINAL B | TIME |
|---|---|---|
| 9. | Hitomi Kashima (JPN) | 59.50 |
| 10. | Mette Jacobsen (DEN) | 59.84 |
| 11. | Svetlana Pozdeyeva (RUS) | 1:00.77 |
| 12. | Sophia Skou (DEN) | 1:01.07 |
| 13. | Katrin Jäke (GER) | 1:01.34 |
| 14. | Ilaria Tocchini (ITA) | 1:01.54 |
| 15. | Niuvis Rosales (CUB) | 1:01.89 |
| 16. | Catherine Surya (INA) | 1:02.14 |

== See also ==
- 1996 Women's Olympic Games 100m Butterfly
- 1997 Women's European LC Championships 100m Butterfly
