= Dančević =

Dančević (Serbo-Croatian pronunciation: [dǎːntʃeʋitɕ]) is a Croatian and Serbian surname. Notable people with the surname include:

- Frank Dancevic (born 1984), Canadian tennis player
- Tinka Dančević (born 1980), retired Croatian swimmer
