= Crissy Ahmann-Leighton =

American swimmer (born 1970)

Personal information
- Full name: Christine M. Ahmann-Leighton
- National team: United States
- Born: May 20, 1970 (age 56) Yankton, South Dakota, U.S.
- Height: 5 ft 8 in (173 cm)
- Weight: 115 lb (52 kg)

Sport
- Sport: Swimming
- Strokes: Freestyle, butterfly
- College team: University of Arizona
Medal record
Women's swimming
Representing the United States
Summer Olympics
Gold medal – first place	1992 Barcelona	4x100 m freestyle
Gold medal – first place	1992 Barcelona	4x100 m medley
Silver medal – second place	1992 Barcelona	100 m butterfly
World Championships (LC)
Gold medal – first place	1991 Perth	4x100 m medley
Pan Pacific Championships
Gold medal – first place	1991 Edmonton	4x100 m medley
Silver medal – second place	1991 Edmonton	100 m butterfly

Christine M. Ahmann-Leighton (married Perham) (born May 20, 1970) is an American former competition swimmer, Olympic champion, and former world record-holder.

Ahmann-Leighton attended the University of Arizona from 1988 to 1992, where she swam for the Arizona Wildcats swimming and diving team in National Collegiate Athletic Association (NCAA) competition. She won NCAA national championships in the 100-yard butterfly in 1991 and 1992.

She competed at the 1992 Summer Olympics in Barcelona, Spain, where she received three medals. She won a gold medal by swimming the butterfly leg for the winning U.S. team in the women's 4×100-meter medley relay. Together with relay teammates Lea Loveless (backstroke), Anita Nall (breaststroke), and Jenny Thompson (freestyle), she set a new world record of 4:02.54 in the event final. Ahmann-Leighton received another gold medal for swimming for the winning U.S. team in preliminary heats of the women's 4×100-meter freestyle relay. Individually, she also received a silver medal for her second-place performance in the women's 100-meter butterfly, recording a time of 58.74 seconds in the event final.

== See also ==
- List of Olympic medalists in swimming (women)
- List of University of Arizona people
- List of World Aquatics Championships medalists in swimming (women)
- World record progression 4 × 100 metres medley relay
