= 2000 European Short Course Swimming Championships =

Water sport competitions

- Host city: Valencia, Spain
- Date: 14–17 December 2000
- Venue: Luis Puig Palace

The fourth edition of the European Short Course Championships was held in Palau Luis Puig in Valencia, Spain, from December 14 to December 17, 2000, just a couple of months after the Sydney Games.

== Medal table ==
Host nation

Rank	Nation	Gold	Silver	Bronze	Total
1	Sweden (SWE)	10	4	2	16
2	Italy (ITA)	7	1	1	9
3	Germany (GER)	5	5	2	12
4	Czech Republic (CZE)	3	3	3	9
5	Slovakia (SVK)	3	0	1	4
6	Great Britain (GBR)	2	7	10	19
7	Ukraine (UKR)	2	1	2	5
8	Iceland (ISL)	2	1	0	3
9	Russia (RUS)	1	3	1	5
10	Croatia (CRO)	1	2	1	4
10	Poland (POL)	1	2	1	4
12	Slovenia (SLO)	1	0	3	4
13	Switzerland (SUI)	1	0	1	2
14	France (FRA)	1	0	0	1
15	Spain (ESP)*	0	4	2	6
16	Denmark (DEN)	0	2	1	3
17	Estonia (EST)	0	1	0	1
17	Finland (FIN)	0	1	0	1
19	Norway (NOR)	0	0	3	3
20	Austria (AUT)	0	0	1	1
20	Israel (ISR)	0	0	1	1
20	Lithuania (LTU)	0	0	1	1
Totals (22 entries)		40	37	37	114

== Men's events ==
=== 50 m freestyle ===
RANK	FINAL	COUNTRY	TIME
Gold	Stefan Nystrand	(Sweden) SWE	21.52
Silver	Mark Foster	(United Kingdom) GBR	21.60
Bronze	Oleksandr Volynets	(Ukraine) UKR	21.70

=== 100 m freestyle ===
RANK	FINAL	COUNTRY	TIME
Gold	Stefan Nystrand	(Sweden) SWE	47.56
Silver	Denis Pimankov	(Russia) RUS	47.69
Bronze	Karel Novy	(Switzerland) SUI	47.87

=== 200 m freestyle ===
RANK	FINAL	COUNTRY	TIME
Gold	Massimiliano Rosolino	(Italy) ITA	1:44.63
Silver	Květoslav Svoboda	(Czech Republic) CZE	1:45.27
Bronze	Paul Palmer	(United Kingdom) GBR	1:46.24

=== 400 m freestyle ===
RANK	FINAL	COUNTRY	TIME
Gold	Massimiliano Rosolino	(Italy) ITA	3:39.59 ER
Silver	Paul Palmer	(United Kingdom) GBR	3:44.80
Bronze	Květoslav Svoboda	(Czech Republic) CZE	3:47.36

=== 1500 m freestyle ===
RANK	FINAL	COUNTRY	TIME
Gold	Massimiliano Rosolino	(Italy) ITA	14:36.93 ER
Silver	Frederik Hviid	(Spain) ESP	14:53.93
Bronze	Igor Chervynskyi	(Ukraine) UKR	14:56.36

=== 50 m backstroke ===
RANK	FINAL	COUNTRY	TIME
Gold	Ante Mašković	(Croatia) CRO	24.60
Silver	Örn Arnarson	(Iceland) ISL	24.81
Bronze	Darius Grigalionis	(Lithuania) LTU	24.82

=== 100 m backstroke ===
RANK	FINAL	COUNTRY	TIME
Gold	Örn Arnarson	(Iceland) ISL	52.28 ER
Silver	Gordan Kožulj	(Croatia) CRO	52.57
Bronze	Przemysław Wilant	(Poland) POL	53.21

=== 200 m backstroke ===
RANK	FINAL	COUNTRY	TIME
Gold	Örn Arnarson	(Iceland) ISL	1:52.90
Silver	Gordan Kožulj	(Croatia) CRO	1:53.50
Bronze	Blaž Medvešek	(Slovenia) SLO	1:54.61

=== 50 m breaststroke ===
RANK	FINAL	COUNTRY	TIME
Gold	Mark Warnecke	(Germany) GER	27.11
Gold	Daniel Málek	(Czech Republic) CZE	27.11
Gold	Domenico Fioravanti	(Italy) ITA	27.11

=== 100 m breaststroke ===
RANK	FINAL	COUNTRY	TIME
Gold	Domenico Fioravanti	(Italy) ITA	58.89
Silver	Daniel Málek	(Czech Republic) CZE	59.67
Bronze	Darren Mew	(United Kingdom) GBR	1:00.04

=== 200 m breaststroke ===
RANK	FINAL	COUNTRY	TIME
Gold	Stéphan Perrot	(France) FRA	2:07.58 ER
Silver	Domenico Fioravanti	(Italy) ITA	2:08.76
Bronze	Daniel Málek	(Czech Republic) CZE	2:08.86

=== 50 m butterfly ===
RANK	FINAL	COUNTRY	TIME
Gold	Mark Foster	(United Kingdom) GBR	23.31
Silver	Jere Hård	(Finland) FIN	23.48
Bronze	Jorge Luis Ulibarri	(Spain) ESP	23.61

=== 100 m butterfly ===
RANK	FINAL	COUNTRY	TIME
Gold	Thomas Rupprath	(Germany) GER	51.31
Silver	Lars Frölander	(Sweden) SWE	51.76
Bronze	Anatoly Polyakov	(Russia) RUS	52.54

=== 200 m butterfly ===
RANK	FINAL	COUNTRY	TIME
Gold	Thomas Rupprath	(Germany) GER	1:53.28
Silver	Anatoly Polyakov	(Russia) RUS	1:54.01
Bronze	Stephen Parry	(United Kingdom) GBR	1:54.37

=== 100 m individual medley ===
RANK	FINAL	COUNTRY	TIME
Gold	Peter Mankoč	(Slovenia) SLO	54.14
Silver	Indrek Sei	(Estonia) EST	54.22
Bronze	Davide Cassol	(Italy) ITA	55.10

=== 200 m individual medley ===
RANK	FINAL	COUNTRY	TIME
Gold	Massimiliano Rosolino	(Italy) ITA	1:56.62
Silver	Christian Keller	(Germany) GER	1:57.68
Bronze	Peter Mankoč	(Slovenia) SLO	1:58.14

=== 400 m individual medley ===
RANK	FINAL	COUNTRY	TIME
Gold	Alessio Boggiatto	(Italy) ITA	4:10.61
Silver	Frederik Hviid	(Spain) ESP	4:12.94
Bronze	Michael Halika	(Israel) ISR	4:13.48

=== 4 × 50 m freestyle relay ===
RANK	FINAL	COUNTRY	TIME
Gold	Joakim Dahl; Stefan Nystrand; Lars Frölander; Claes Andersson	(Sweden) SWE	1:27.52
Silver	Thomas Winkler; Stephan Kunzelmann; Stefan Herbst; Sven Guske	(Germany) GER	1:27.81
Bronze	Anthony Howard; Mark Foster; Stephen Parry; Matthew Kidd	(United Kingdom) GBR	1:28.18

=== 4 × 50 m medley relay ===
RANK	FINAL	COUNTRY	TIME
Gold	Sebastian Halgasch; Mark Warnecke; Thomas Rupprath; Thomas Winkler	(Germany) GER	1:36.23
Silver	Volodymyr Nikolaychuk; Oleg Lisogor; Andriy Serdinov; Oleksandr Volynets	(Ukraine) UKR	1:37.48
Bronze	Ante Mašković; Vanja Rogulj; Tomislav Karlo; Duje Draganja	(Croatia) CRO	1:37.71

== Women's events ==
=== 50 m freestyle ===
RANK	FINAL	COUNTRY	TIME
Gold	Therese Alshammar	(Sweden) SWE	24.09
Silver	Alison Sheppard	(United Kingdom) GBR	24.48
Bronze	Anna-Karin Kammerling	(Sweden) SWE	24.75

=== 100 m freestyle ===
RANK	FINAL	COUNTRY	TIME
Gold	Therese Alshammar	(Sweden) SWE	53.13
Silver	Johanna Sjöberg	(Sweden) SWE	53.82
Bronze	Martina Moravcová	(Slovakia) SVK	53.97

=== 200 m freestyle ===
RANK	FINAL	COUNTRY	TIME
Gold	Martina Moravcová	(Slovakia) SVK	1:56.51
Silver	Karen Pickering	(United Kingdom) GBR	1:57.22
Bronze	Karen Legg	(United Kingdom) GBR	1:57.60

=== 400 m freestyle ===
RANK	FINAL	COUNTRY	TIME
Gold	Irina Ufimtseva	(Russia) RUS	4:06.71
Silver	Jana Pechanová	(Czech Republic) CZE	4:09.52
Bronze	Rebecca Cooke	(United Kingdom) GBR	4:10.80

=== 800 m freestyle ===
RANK	FINAL	COUNTRY	TIME
Gold	Chantal Strasser	(Switzerland) SUI	8:27.23
Silver	Rebecca Cooke	(United Kingdom) GBR	8:29.24
Bronze	Jana Pechanová	(Czech Republic) CZE	8:31.17

=== 50 m backstroke ===
RANK	FINAL	COUNTRY	TIME
Gold	Ilona Hlaváčková	(Czech Republic) CZE	27.84
Silver	Nina Zhivanevskaya	(Spain) ESP	28.10
Bronze	Daniela Samulski	(Germany) GER	28.12

=== 100 m backstroke ===
RANK	FINAL	COUNTRY	TIME
Gold	Ilona Hlaváčková	(Czech Republic) CZE	58.82
Silver	Katy Sexton	(United Kingdom) GBR	1:00.04
Bronze	Nina Zhivanevskaya	(Spain) ESP	1:00.09

=== 200 m backstroke ===
RANK	FINAL	COUNTRY	TIME
Gold	Joanna Fargus	(United Kingdom) GBR	2.08.19
Silver	Nina Zhivanevskaya	(Spain) ESP	2.09.15
Bronze	Anja Čarman	(Slovenia) SLO	2.10.71

=== 50 m breaststroke ===
RANK	FINAL	COUNTRY	TIME
Gold	Emma Igelström	(Sweden) SWE	31.26
Silver	Agnieszka Braszkiewicz	(Poland) POL	31.55
Bronze	Anne-Mari Gulbrandsen	(Norway) NOR	31.70

=== 100 m breaststroke ===
RANK	FINAL	COUNTRY	TIME
Gold	Alicja Pęczak	(Poland) POL	1:06.95
Silver	Emma Igelström	(Sweden) SWE	1:07.14
Bronze	Anne-Mari Gulbrandsen	(Norway) NOR	1:08.17

=== 200 m breaststroke ===
RANK	FINAL	COUNTRY	TIME
Gold	Emma Igelström	(Sweden) SWE	2:24.05
Silver	Alicja Pęczak	(Poland) POL	2:24.17
Bronze	Anne-Mari Gulbrandsen	(Norway) NOR	2:25.55

=== 50 m butterfly ===
RANK	FINAL	COUNTRY	TIME
Gold	Anna-Karin Kammerling	(Sweden) SWE	25.60 WR
Silver	Karen Egdal	(Denmark) DEN	26.72
Bronze	Johanna Sjöberg	(Sweden) SWE	26.74

=== 100 m butterfly ===
RANK	FINAL	COUNTRY	TIME
Gold	Martina Moravcová	(Slovakia) SVK	57.54 ER
Silver	Johanna Sjöberg	(Sweden) SWE	57.86
Bronze	Mette Jacobsen	(Denmark) DEN	58.91

=== 200 m butterfly ===
RANK	FINAL	COUNTRY	TIME
Gold	Annika Mehlhorn	(Germany) GER	2:05.77 ER
Silver	Mette Jacobsen	(Denmark) DEN	2:07.70
Bronze	Petra Zahrl	(Austria) AUT	2:09.29

=== 100 m individual medley ===
RANK	FINAL	COUNTRY	TIME
Gold	Martina Moravcová	(Slovakia) SVK	1:00.58
Silver	Annika Mehlhorn	(Germany) GER	1:01.21
Bronze	Sue Rolph	(United Kingdom) GBR	1:01.25

=== 200 m individual medley ===
RANK	FINAL	COUNTRY	TIME
Gold	Yana Klochkova	(Ukraine) UKR	2:10.75
Silver	Oxana Verevka	(Russia) RUS	2:12.15
Bronze	Sue Rolph	(United Kingdom) GBR	2:12.28

=== 400 m individual medley ===
RANK	FINAL	COUNTRY	TIME
Gold	Yana Klochkova	(Ukraine) UKR	4:35.11
Silver	Annika Mehlhorn	(Germany) GER	4:39.02
Bronze	Rachael Corner	(United Kingdom) GBR	4:40.11

=== 4 × 50 m freestyle relay ===
RANK	FINAL	COUNTRY	TIME
Gold	Annika Lofstedt; Therese Alshammar; Johanna Sjöberg; Anna-Karin Kammerling	(Sweden) SWE	1:38.21 WR
Silver	Alison Sheppard; Sue Rolph; Karen Pickering; Rosalind Brett	(United Kingdom) GBR	1:38.39
Bronze	Britta Steffen; Petra Dallman; Daniela Samulski; Verena Witte	(Germany) GER	1:39.63

=== 4 × 50 m medley relay ===
RANK	FINAL	COUNTRY	TIME
Gold	Therese Alshammar; Emma Igelström; Anna-Karin Kammerling; Johanna Sjöberg	(Sweden) SWE	1:48.31
Silver	Daniela Samulski; Sylvia Gerasch; Marletta Uhle; Petra Dallman	(Germany) GER	1:50.96
Bronze	Sarah Price; Heidi Earp; Rosalind Brett; Alison Sheppard	(United Kingdom) GBR	1:51.20
