= Swimming at the 2002 Asian Games – Women's 100 metre butterfly =

Women's 100 metre butterfly at the 2002 Asian Games
- Venue: Sajik Swimming Pool
- Date: 2 October 2002
- Competitors: 15 from 10 nations

Medalists
gold medal	Zhou Yafei	China
silver medal	Yuko Nakanishi	Japan
bronze medal	Joscelin Yeo	Singapore

The women's 100 metre butterfly swimming competition at the 2002 Asian Games in Busan was held on 2 October at the Sajik Swimming Pool.

== Schedule ==
All times are Korea Standard Time (UTC+09:00)

Date	Time	Event
Wednesday, 2 October 2002	10:00	Heats
Wednesday, 2 October 2002	19:00	Final

== Records ==
Prior to this competition, the existing world, Asian and Games records were as follows.

World Record	Inge de Bruijn (NED)	56.61	Sydney, Australia	17 September 2000
Asian Record	Liu Limin (CHN)	58.38	Hiroshima, Japan	6 October 1994
Games Record	Liu Limin (CHN)	58.38	Hiroshima, Japan	6 October 1994

== Results ==
=== Heats ===
Rank	Heat	Athlete	Time	Notes
1	2	Yuko Nakanishi (JPN)	1:01.16	
2	1	Zhou Yafei (CHN)	1:01.42	
3	2	Zheng Xi (CHN)	1:01.50	
4	1	Maki Mita (JPN)	1:01.87	
5	2	Joscelin Yeo (SIN)	1:02.38	
6	2	Christel Bouvron (SIN)	1:03.00	
7	1	Flora Kong (HKG)	1:03.32	
8	1	Chan Wing Suet (HKG)	1:03.42	
9	2	Park Kyung-hwa (KOR)	1:03.70	
10	1	Lucia Dacanay (PHI)	1:05.34	
11	2	Richa Mishra (IND)	1:05.59	
12	1	Moe Thu Aung (MYA)	1:08.60	
13	2	Sana Abdul Wahid (PAK)	1:16.24	
14	1	Ayesha Tajwar (PAK)	1:23.26	
15	2	Aishath Azhoora Ahmed (MDV)	1:35.93	

=== Final ===
Rank	Athlete	Time	Notes
1st place, gold medalist(s)	Zhou Yafei (CHN)	58.88	
2nd place, silver medalist(s)	Yuko Nakanishi (JPN)	1:00.18	
3rd place, bronze medalist(s)	Joscelin Yeo (SIN)	1:01.06	
4	Zheng Xi (CHN)	1:01.12	
5	Maki Mita (JPN)	1:01.46	
6	Christel Bouvron (SIN)	1:03.08	
7	Chan Wing Suet (HKG)	1:03.34	
8	Flora Kong (HKG)	1:03.42	
