= Mariza Gregorio =

Mozambican swimmer

Personal information
- Born: 7 August 1976 (age 48)

Sport
- Sport: Swimming

Mariza Mariana Gregorio (born 7 August 1976) is a Mozambican former swimmer. She competed in the women's 100 metre butterfly event at the 1992 Summer Olympics.
