= Hsieh Shu-tzu =

Taiwanese swimmer

Personal information
- Full name: Hsieh Shu-tzu
- National team: Chinese Taipei
- Born: 2 January 1981 (age 45) Taipei, Taiwan
- Height: 1.66 m (5 ft 5 in)
- Weight: 48 kg (106 lb)

Sport
- Sport: Swimming
- Strokes: Butterfly, medley

Hsieh Shu-tzu (Chinese: 謝 淑姿; pinyin: Xiè Shūzī; born January 2, 1981) is a Taiwanese former swimmer, who specialized in butterfly and individual medley events. She represented Chinese Taipei in two editions of the Olympic Games (1996 and 2000), and later captured a silver in the 200 m butterfly at the 2000 Asian Swimming Championships in Busan, South Korea.

Hsieh made her first Chinese Taipei team, as a 15-year-old teen, at the 1996 Summer Olympics in Atlanta. She failed to reach the top 16 final in any of her individual events, finishing eighteenth in the 200 m butterfly (2:16.27), and twenty-ninth in the 400 m individual medley (4:59.52).

At the 2000 Summer Olympics in Sydney, Hsieh swam for Chinese Taipei in the 200 m butterfly. She achieved a FINA B-cut of 2:13.43 after winning a silver medal from the Asian Championships six months earlier. She challenged seven other swimmers in heat four, including Aussie favorite Petria Thomas and Polish teenager Otylia Jędrzejczak. Coming from seventh at the halfway turn, Hsieh faded down the final stretch to pick up a last spot by almost eight seconds behind joint leaders Thomas and Jedrzejczak, in a time of 2:16.23. Hsieh failed to advance into the semifinals, as she placed twenty-ninth overall in the prelims.
