= Natalia Roubina =

Cypriot swimmer (born 1984)

Personal information
- Full name: Natalia Roubina
- National team: Cyprus
- Born: 19 July 1984 (age 41) Nicosia, Cyprus
- Height: 1.70 m (5 ft 7 in)
- Weight: 57 kg (126 lb)

Sport
- Sport: Swimming
- Strokes: Freestyle, butterfly

Natalia Roubina (Greek: Ναταλία Ρουμπίνα; born July 19, 1984) is a Cypriot former swimmer, who specialized in middle-distance freestyle and butterfly events. She represented Cyprus, as a 16-year-old, at the 2000 Summer Olympics and at the 2002 Commonwealth Games.

Roubina competed only in the women's 200 m butterfly at the 2000 Summer Olympics in Sydney. She established a Cypriot record and a FINA B-cut of 2:16.41 from the Games of the Small States of Europe in Vaduz, Liechtenstein. She challenged seven other swimmers in heat two, including France's three-time Olympian Cécile Jeanson and Singapore's 15-year-old Christel Bouvron. She held off a sprint battle from Greece's Zampia Melachroinou on the final stretch to move herself up from seventh to a sixth seed in 2:17.01, exactly six-tenths of a second (0.60) below her own national record. Roubina failed to advance into the semifinals, as she placed thirtieth overall in the prelims.

At the 2002 Commonwealth Games in Manchester, England, Roubina helped the Cypriots earn a seventh spot in the 4×100 m medley relay, finishing with a final time of 4:41.77.
