= Corina Dumitru =

Romanian swimmer

Personal information
- Born: 24 October 1973 (age 52)

Sport
- Sport: Swimming

Corina Dumitru (born 24 October 1973) is a Romanian swimmer. She competed in the women's 200 metre butterfly event at the 1992 Summer Olympics.
