= Fish kick =

Swimming method

The fish kick is a method of kicking while swimming, generally used underwater. It was pioneered by the American Misty Hyman and has been cited as possibly the fastest kicking method for humans.

== Procedure and effectiveness ==
Fish kicking is a form of undulation-based kicking, which is movement of the legs, together, forward and back in a cyclical pattern. The result of such a kick has been described as comparable to a pump, which pushes the swimmer forward. The most common form of this is known as "dolphin kick", which involves moving legs up and down (towards the top and bottom of a pool). The fish kick is essentially performing the dolphin kick sideways. The legs go left and right in a wave motion. This may have the beneficial effect of pushing water sideways, where it is not impeded, rather than the dolphin kick, which sees the water stopped by the top and bottom of the pool.

The kick is sometimes cited as the fastest way to swim. An article published by Slate described it as the "fastest way for a human to swim" when executed properly. An article in the International Journal of Performance Analysis in Sport noted that the kick provides "an incontestable advantage from a hydrodynamic point of view". The journal published a study that compared swimmers using dolphin kick with fish kick and found that the fish kick was generally faster on a short distance and that it was generally "almost as fast", even though the swimmers had no prior experience with the stroke. The kick has been noted for its difficulty in executing correctly.

== History and use ==
Misty Hyman, an American butterfly stroke swimmer, first used the kick after her coach, Bob Gillett, read an article in Scientific American that was published in 1995 about how fish swim through the water. Gillett experimented in developing a form of kicking based on it, and the two began working in December 1995. Once it was perfected, Hyman was able to use the kick successfully, breaking the world record in women's 100-meter short course butterfly in 1997 and winning the women's 200-meter butterfly at the 2000 Summer Olympics in Sydney. Both times, the kick was credited with helping her succeed. The method was criticized by other swimmers for providing an unfair advantage and for the waves it sends to other lanes.

The stroke has not seen wide adoption among professional swimmers, though some, such as Alexander Popov, a Russian, and Ian Thorpe, an Australian, have trained using the stroke. During the 2012 London Olympics, Great Britain's Liam Tancock used it for most of his underwater in the 4 x 100 medley relay. Ryan Held, also an American, made use of the fish kick at the Rio 2016 Summer Olympics in the turn for his leg of the men's 4-by-100 freestyle relay.
