= Flora Kong =

Hong Kong swimmer (born 1984)

Personal information
- Full name: Flora Kong Yan Kay
- National team: Hong Kong
- Born: 14 December 1984 (age 41) Hong Kong
- Height: 1.60 m (5 ft 3 in)
- Weight: 46 kg (101 lb)

Sport
- Sport: Swimming
- Strokes: Butterfly
- Club: Irvine Novaquatics (U.S.)
- College team: University of California, Berkeley (U.S.)
- Coach: Dave Salo (U.S.)

Flora Kong Yan Kay (also Kong Yan Kay or Flora Kong, Chinese: 江欣琦; pinyin: Jiāng Xīnqí; Jyutping: gong^{1} jan^{1} kei^{4}; born December 14, 1984) is a Hong Kong former swimmer, who specialized in butterfly events. She represented Hong Kong, as a 15-year-old, at the 2000 Summer Olympics, and later became a finalist in the 200 m butterfly at the 2002 Asian Games.

Kong competed only in the women's 100 m butterfly at the 2000 Summer Olympics in Sydney. She achieved a FINA B-cut of 1:03.39 from the Hong Kong Long Course Championships. She challenged six other swimmers in heat two, including two-time Olympians Hsieh Shu-ting and María del Pilar Pereyra. Coming from third at the final turn, Kong strengthened her own pace on the final stretch, but fell short to second place by more than half a second (0.50) behind Hsieh in 1:04.09. Kong failed to advance into the semifinals, as she placed forty-second overall on the first day of prelims.

At the 2002 Asian Games in Busan, South Korea, Kong failed to medal in any of her individual events, finishing eighth in the 100 m butterfly (1:03.42), and eleventh in the 200 m butterfly (2:22.41).

When she left Hong Kong to come to the United States, Kong trained for world-class coach Dave Salo at the Irvine Novaquatics Club, and helped the swim team set school records in all medley relays (both 200 and 400 m). She also competed for the California Golden Bears swimming and diving team under women's head coach Teri McKeever, and spent two years of undergraduate studies at the University of California, Berkeley.
