= Li Jie (swimmer) =

Chinese swimmer

Personal information
- Born: March 24, 1983 (age 43) Qingdao, China

Sport
- Sport: Swimming
- Strokes: Butterfly

Li Jie (Chinese: 李杰, born March 24, 1983, in Qingdao) is a female Chinese butterfly swimmer who competed in the 2004 Summer Olympics.

She finished 16th in the 200 metre butterfly event after being eliminated in the semifinals.
