= Melissa Mata =

Costa Rican swimmer (born 1980)

Personal information
- Born: 25 March 1980 (age 46)

Sport
- Sport: Swimming
Medal record
Representing Costa Rica
Central American and Caribbean Games
Gold medal – first place	1998 Maracaibo	200m butterfly
Silver medal – second place	1998 Maracaibo	100m butterfly

Melissa Mata (born 25 March 1980) is a Costa Rican swimmer. She competed in the women's 200 metre butterfly event at the 1996 Summer Olympics.
