= Silvia Szalai =

German swimmer (born 1975)

Personal information
- Full name: Silvia Szalai
- Nationality: Germany
- Born: 26 February 1975 (age 51) Szeged, Csongrád, Hungary

Sport
- Sport: Swimming
- Strokes: Freestyle
- Club: SG Frankfurt/M
Medal record
Women's swimming
Representing Germany
World Championships (LC)
Gold medal – first place	1998 Perth	4×200 m freestyle
Silver medal – second place	1998 Perth	4×100 m freestyle
Silver medal – second place	2001 Fukuoka	4×200 m freestyle
European Championships (LC)
Gold medal – first place	1999 Istanbul	4×200 m freestyle
European Championships (SC)
Bronze medal – third place	1999 Lisbon	400 m freestyle

Silvia Szalai (born 26 February 1975) is a retired German swimmer who won one silver and two gold medals in the 4 × 200 m freestyle relay at the European and world championships in 1998, 1999 and 2001. At the 2001 World Aquatics Championships her team finished in fourth place, but the leading Australian and US squads were disqualified.

She was born in Hungary and later moved to Frankfurt, hoping to compete for Germany at the 2000 Summer Olympics. However, the International Olympic Committee rejected her application on technical grounds.
