= Misty Hyman =

American swimmer (born 1979)

Personal information
- Full name: Misty Dawn Marie Hyman -Hovey
- National team: United States
- Born: March 23, 1979 (age 47) Mesa, Arizona, U.S.
- Education: Stanford University; Les Roches University (Hospitality, 2002); Crans-Montana, Switzerland
- Occupations: Swim Coach, Instructor; Motivational Speaker
- Height: 5 ft 7 in (1.70 m)
- Weight: 143 lb (65 kg)

Sport
- Sport: Swimming
- Strokes: Backstroke, butterfly
- Club: Arizona Desert Fox; Phoenix, Arizona
- College team: Stanford University
- Coach: Bob Gillett (Arizona Desert Fox); Richard Quick (Stanford, Olympics)
Medal record
Women's swimming
Representing the United States
Olympic Games
Gold medal – first place	2000 Sydney	200 m butterfly
World Championships (LC)
Bronze medal – third place	1998 Perth	200 m butterfly
World Championships (SC)
Silver medal – second place	1997 Gothenburg	200 m backstroke
Silver medal – second place	1997 Gothenburg	4×100 m medley
Bronze medal – third place	1995 Rio de Janeiro	4×100 m medley
Bronze medal – third place	1997 Gothenburg	100 m backstroke
Bronze medal – third place	1997 Gothenburg	100 m butterfly
Bronze medal – third place	1997 Gothenburg	200 m butterfly
Pan Pacific Championships
Bronze medal – third place	1997 Fukuoka	200 m butterfly

Misty Dawn Marie Hyman (born March 23, 1979) also known by her married name Misty Dawn Hyman Hovey, is an American former competition swimmer, Olympic gold medalist, and former world record-holder in the 50 and 100-meter butterfly who competed for Stanford University. In her best-known achievement, she won the gold medal in the women's 200-meter butterfly at the 2000 Summer Olympics in Sydney, Australia in Olympic record time, becoming the first American woman to win the event since 1960. Her victory ended Australian swimmer Susie O'Neill's six-year unbeaten streak in the event. Gaining wide national recognition in the swimming community, Hyman twice won the Honda Sports Award for Swimming and Diving. She later worked as a coach, serving as head swim coach at her alma mater, Shadow Mountain High School and later worked from 2015-2017 as an assistant coach for Arizona State University's swimming and diving team.

== Early life and education ==
Hyman was born in Mesa, Arizona on March 23, 1979, to father Steve and mother Margaret Hyman, though she grew up in Phoenix, Arizona. She graduated from Shadow Mountain High School in Phoenix and competed for their swim team in the 1990's. A very able student, Hyman graduated High School with a 4.0 average. At the 1997 Arizona State High School 5A Championships, Hyman established national records in the 100 butterfly, 100 backstroke and 200 medley relay. From around 1993-1997, Hyman trained with the Arizona Desert Fox (AFOX) swim club under ASCAA Hall of Fame coach Bob Gillett who served as the Head Coach and Founder of AFOX, coaching the team from 1975-2000 at Phoenix's Arizona Sports Ranch. Under Gillette's mentorship, Hyman became a High School National Record Holder in the 100-yard butterfly. Though a major influence in Hyman's development, particularly in butterfly, Gillett was not present at the final of the women’s 200-meter butterfly at the 2000 Summer Olympics, where she won the gold medal.

=== Stanford University ===
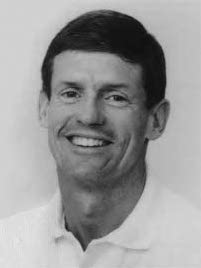
Coach Quick in 1988

From around 1997-2001, she attended Stanford University, under Hall of Fame Coach Richard Quick where she swam for the Stanford Cardinal swimming and diving team with Jessica Foschi. Hyman was an International Relations Major.

Hyman received collegiate All-American honors 28 times during her Stanford career. She also held world rankings in several butterfly events, with most of those performances recorded at the 2000 U.S. Olympic Trials; her 200-meter butterfly ranking was recorded at the 2000 Sydney Olympics. At Stanford, she held school records in the 200-yard backstroke with a time of 1:53.12 and the 100-yard butterfly with a time of 51.34. She also recorded the second-fastest Stanford times in the 200-yard butterfly (1:53.60) and the 200-yard freestyle (1:45.40).

While at Stanford, she befriended fellow Stanford student Chelsea Clinton, who would later be watching in Sydney when Hyman won the gold medal. She graduated from Stanford in 2002 and earned an MBA in Hospitality at Les Roches University in Switzerland in 2002.

== Competitive career ==
Hyman made the Olympic trials in 1992, but did not qualify for the team. In March 1996, she just missed making the U.S. Olympic team for the 1996 Atlanta Games, finishing third and fourth at the U.S. Olympic Trials in the 100- and 200-meter butterfly events. Hyman competed as a member of the U.S. Finswimming Team at the 8th World Championship held in Hungary during August 1996.

In addition to the medals listed under Medal Record in the infobox at right, Hyman won a gold medal in the 100 meter backstroke at the 1995 short course World Swimming Championships in Rio de Janeiro.

=== World records ===
Hyman established a World Record in the 50-meter butterfly of 26.55 in Short Course Swimming in Goteberg Sweden on April 19, 1997 that held through November 29, 1997. She established a new world record in the 100 meter butterfly on December 1, 1996, in Sainte-Foy Canada, that held through March 28, 1997, as shown in the records box below.

=== Honors ===
She twice received the Honda Sports Award for Swimming and Diving, recognizing her as the outstanding college female swimmer of the year in 1997–98 and again in 2000–01.

== 2000 Sydney Olympics ==
On the evening of September 20, 2000, at the 2000 Summer Olympics in Sydney, Australia, it was anticipated that Hyman could only contend for a silver in the women's 200-meter butterfly, as Australian Susie O'Neill was expected to repeat her title. O'Neill had been undefeated in the 200-meter butterfly for the previous 6 years; and was swimming in her home country. Swimming in Lane 6 where she came from behind in the event final, Hyman completed the 200 fly in the Olympic record time of 2:05.88, with O'Neill placing a close second for the silver with a time of 2:06.58, and Petria Thomas of Australia taking the bronze with a time of 2:07.12. Hyman's victory was largely credited to her expert use of the demanding fish kick on turns. The fish kick, largely pioneered by her former coach Bob Gillett, requires a swimmer to swim on their side so their legs move from side to side rather than up and down as they do with the traditional dolphin kick. At the 2000 Olympics, Hyman was managed and trained by her former Stanford Coach, Richard Quick.

== Coaching career ==
In 2009, Hyman returned to her former High School, Shadow Mountain, (SMHS) and was appointed the Head Swim Coach. She would be awarded the "Coach of the Year" award later that season. Hyman switched to part-time coaching at SMHS in 2011.

In 2009, Hyman began teaching private swimming lessons as part of the fitness team at the Sanctuary on Camelback Resort in Paradise Valley, Arizona. She later established a private pool where she also provided swim instruction..

In 2015, Hyman was named an assistant coach at Arizona State University's swimming and diving team.

She and her husband announced the birth of their daughter Vivian Margaret Eileen Hovey, born on September 23, 2017, taking time off from her coaching job at Arizona State University. After leaving Arizona State in 2017, she focused on providing private swimming lessons independently and at the Sanctuary at Camelback Resort in Paradise Valley, attending public speaking engagements, and teaching or coaching at the occasional swim clinic.

== See also ==
- List of Olympic medalists in swimming (women)
- List of Stanford University people
- List of World Aquatics Championships medalists in swimming (women)
- World record progression 50 metres butterfly
- World record progression 100 metres butterfly

Records
Preceded by Liu Limin	Women's 100-meter butterfly world record-holder (short course); December 1, 1996 – March 28, 1997	Succeeded by Ayari Aoyama
