= Petra Zahrl =

Austrian swimmer

Personal information
- Full name: Petra Zahrl
- National team: Austria
- Born: 4 April 1981 (age 45) Vienna, Austria
- Height: 1.69 m (5 ft 7 in)
- Weight: 60 kg (132 lb)

Sport
- Sport: Swimming
- Strokes: Freestyle, butterfly
- Club: SC Donau
Medal record
Women's swimming
Representing Austria
European Championships (SC)
Bronze medal – third place	2000 Valencia	200 m butterfly

Petra Zahrl (born April 4, 1981) is an Austrian former swimmer, who specialized in freestyle and butterfly events. Since 2009, she currently holds four Austrian records in the freestyle and medley relays. She also claimed a bronze medal in the 200 m butterfly (2:09.29) at the 2000 European Short Course Swimming Championships in Valencia, Spain.

Zahrl made her first Austrian team at the 2000 Summer Olympics in Sydney, where she competed in the women's 200 m butterfly. Swimming in heat two, she picked up a third spot and twenty-third overall by seven tenths of a second (0.70) behind Macedonia's Mirjana Boševska in 2:13.29.

At the 2004 Summer Olympics in Athens, Zahrl qualified again for the 200 m butterfly by eclipsing a FINA A-cut of 2:10.50 from the European Championships in Madrid. She challenged seven other swimmers on the same heat as Sydney, including top medal favorite Éva Risztov of Hungary. She edged out 15-year-old Kwon You-Ri of South Korea to take a seventh spot by 0.38 of a second in 2:13.92. Zahrl failed to advance into the semifinals, as she managed to repeat a twenty-third-place finish from Sydney in the preliminaries.
