= Paola Cavallino =

Italian swimmer (born 1977)

Personal information
- Born: 6 June 1977 (age 49)
Medal record
Women's Swimming
Representing Italy
European Championships (LC)
Silver medal – second place	2004 Madrid	200 m butterfly
Mediterranean Games
Gold medal – first place	1997 Bari	200 m butterfly

Paola Cavallino (born 6 June 1977 in Genoa) is a butterfly swimmer from Italy, who won the silver medal in the women's 200 metres butterfly event at the 2004 European Championships. She represented her native country a couple of months later at the 2004 Summer Olympics in Athens, Greece.
