= Marcela Kubalčíková =

Czech swimmer

Personal information
- Nationality: Czech Republic
- Born: 23 April 1973 (age 53) Zlín
- Height: 1.75 m (5 ft 9 in)
- Weight: 66 kg (146 lb)

Sport
- Sport: Swimming
- Strokes: Backstroke and butterfly
- Club: SK Zlín

Marcela Kubalčíková (born 23 April 1973) is a Czech retired backstroke and butterfly swimmer. She competed for the Czech Republic at the 1996 Olympic Games in Atlanta, Georgia.
