= Iuliana Pantelimon =

Romanian swimmer

Personal information
- Born: 23 July 1975 (age 50)

Sport
- Sport: Swimming

Iuliana Pantelimon (born 23 July 1975) is a Romanian butterfly swimmer. She competed in two events at the 1992 Summer Olympics.
