= Roser Vives =

Spanish swimmer

Personal information
- Born: February 5, 1984 (age 42)

Sport
- Sport: Swimming

Roser Vives (born 5 February 1984) is a Spanish butterfly swimmer who competed in the 2004 Summer Olympics.
