= Mika Haruna =

Japanese swimmer (born 1978)

Personal information
- Full name: Mika Haruna
- Nationality: Japan
- Born: June 14, 1978 (age 48) Hyogo, Japan
- Height: 1.60 m (5 ft 3 in)
- Weight: 53 kg (117 lb)

Sport
- Sport: Swimming
- Strokes: Butterfly
Medal record
Women's swimming
Representing Japan
Pan Pacific Championships
Silver medal – second place	1993 Kobe	200m butterfly
Silver medal – second place	1995 Atlanta	200m butterfly
Asian Games
Silver medal – second place	1994 Hiroshima	4x100 m medley
Bronze medal – third place	1994 Hiroshima	200 m butterfly
Universiade
Silver medal – second place	1997 Messina	200m butterfly

Mika Haruna (春名 美佳, Haruna Mika; born 14 June 1978) is a former Japanese swimmer who competed in the 1992 Summer Olympics and in the 1996 Summer Olympics.
