= Chan Wing-suet =

Hong Kong swimmer (born 1986)

Chan Wing-suet OLY
Personal information
- Full name: Sandy Chan Wing-suet
- National team: Hong Kong
- Born: 26 September 1986 (age 39) Hong Kong, Hong Kong
- Height: 1.64 m (5 ft 5 in)
- Weight: 50 kg (110 lb)

Sport
- Sport: Swimming
- Strokes: Butterfly
- Club: HTA Sports Club

Sandy Chan Wing-suet (also Chan Wing-suet, or Sandy Chan Chinese: 陳詠雪; pinyin: Chén Yǒngxuě; Jyutping: can^{4} wing^{6}syut^{3}; born September 26, 1986) is a Hong Kong former swimmer, who specialized in butterfly events. She is a two-time Olympian (2000 and 2004) and a double finalist at the Asian Games (2002).

Chan made her Olympic debut, as Hong Kong's youngest swimmer (aged 13), at the 2000 Summer Olympics in Sydney, where she competed in the women's 200 m butterfly. She topped the first heat in a time of 2:19.86, but finished only in thirty-third overall from the preliminaries.

At the 2002 Asian Games in Busan, South Korea, Chan attempted to claim her first career medal, but settled only for seventh place in the 100 m butterfly, and fifth in the 200 m butterfly (2:17.42).

At the 2004 Summer Olympics in Athens, Chan qualified again for the 200 m butterfly, by posting a FINA B-cut of 2:16.49 from the Hong Kong Championships in Kowloon. She challenged seven other swimmers on the same heat as Sydney, including 15-year-old Maria Bulakhova of Russia. She raced to fourth place by three tenths of a second (0.30) behind Slovenia's Anja Klinar in 2:18.45. Chan failed to advance into the semifinals, as she placed twenty-ninth overall in the prelims.
