= Margie Pedder =

English swimmer (born 1980)

Personal information
- Full name: Margaretha Pedder
- Nickname: "Margie"
- National team: Great Britain
- Born: 27 June 1980 (age 46) Portsmouth, England
- Height: 1.67 m (5 ft 5 1/2 in)
- Weight: 60 kg (132 lb)

Sport
- Sport: Swimming
- Strokes: Butterfly
- Club: Portsmouth Northsea Swim Club & USC
- College team: University of Southern California
- Coach: Chris Nesbit
Medal record
Women's swimming
Summer Universiade
Representing Great Britain
Bronze medal – third place	2001 Beijing	200 m butterfly
Commonwealth Games
Representing England
Bronze medal – third place	2002 Manchester	200 m butterfly

Margaretha Pedder (born 27 June 1980) is an English former competitive swimmer who specialised in butterfly events.

== Swimming career ==
Pedder is the former British record holder in both the 100m butterfly and the 200m butterfly and became a semifinalist in the 200 m butterfly at the 2000 Summer Olympics. Later she captured a bronze medal when her nation England hosted the 2002 Commonwealth Games. During her sporting career, Pedder trained with the Portsmouth Northsea Swim Club under head coach Chris Nesbit and later at the University of Southern California under Mark Schubert.

Pedder competed in a butterfly double, as a member of Team GB, at the 2000 Summer Olympics in Sydney. She eclipsed FINA A-standards of 1:00.74 (100 m butterfly) and 2:10.57 (200 m butterfly) from the British Olympic Trials in Sheffield. On the first day of the Games, Pedder placed thirtieth in the 100 m butterfly. Swimming in heat four, she escaped from last at the turn to edge out Finland's Marja Pärssinen by 0.41 seconds for the seventh seed in 1:01.53. Three days later, in the 200 m butterfly, Pedder advanced to the top 16, and finished her semifinal run with an eleventh-place time and a lifetime best of 2:10.49.

When her nation England hosted the 2002 Commonwealth Games in Manchester, Pedder enjoyed the race by a massive roar of a home crowd, as she took home the bronze in the 200 m butterfly at 2:11.60, extending a delightful feast for the Brits with a two–three finish.

At the ASA National British Championships she won the 100 metres butterfly title in 2000 and the 200 metres butterfly title four times in 1996, 1997, 1998 and 1999.

Pedder also competed in U.S collegiate swimming for the University of Southern California, where she became a three-time All-American in the mile and 800 freestyle relay.
