= Natalya Sutyagina =

Russian swimmer

Personal information
- Full name: Наталья Викторовна Сутягина
- Nationality: Russia
- Born: 17 January 1980 (age 46) Penza, Soviet Union
- Height: 1.72 m (5 ft 8 in)
- Weight: 55 kg (121 lb)

Sport
- Sport: Swimming
- Strokes: Butterfly
Medal record
Women's swimming
Representing Russia
European Championships (LC)
Gold medal – first place	2004 Madrid	50 m butterfly
Silver medal – second place	2008 Eindhoven	4x100 medley
European Championships (SC)
Bronze medal – third place	2001 Antwerp	50 m butterfly
Summer Universiade
Silver medal – second place	2001 Beijing	100 m butterfly

Natalya Sutyagina (born 17 January 1980 in Penza) is a butterfly swimmer from Russia, who won the gold medal in the 50 m butterfly at the 2004 European Aquatics Championships. She is trained by Vladimir Timofeev. Sutyagina competed at three consecutive Summer Olympics, starting in 2000.
