= Raquel Felgueiras =

Portuguese swimmer

Personal information
- Full name: Raquel Maria Reis Felgueiras
- National team: Portugal
- Born: 1 February 1980 (age 46) Lisbon, Portugal
- Height: 1.71 m (5 ft 7 in)
- Weight: 64 kg (141 lb)

Sport
- Sport: Swimming
- Strokes: Butterfly
- Club: Sporting Clube de Braga
- Coach: José Manuel Borges

Raquel Maria Reis Felgueiras (born 1 February 1980) is a Portuguese former swimmer, who specialized in butterfly events. She held a long-course Portuguese record in the 200 m butterfly until it was broken by Sara Oliveira in 2008 (2:10.14). Felgueiras is a former member of Sporting Clube de Braga, and is trained by her long-time coach and mentor José Manuel Borges.

Felgueiras made her Olympic debut, as Portugal's only female swimmer, at the 2000 Summer Olympics in Sydney, where she competed in the women's 200 m butterfly. Swimming in heat two, she picked up a fifth spot and twenty-seventh overall by 0.72 of a second behind Ukraine's Zhanna Lozumyrska in 2:15.19.

At the 2004 Summer Olympics in Athens, Felgueiras qualified again for the 200 m butterfly by eclipsing a FINA B-cut of 2:13.08 from the European Championships in Madrid. She challenged seven other swimmers on the same heat as Sydney, including top medal favorite Éva Risztov of Hungary. She raced to sixth place by 0.54 of a second behind Risztov's teammate Beatrix Boulsevicz, matching her personal best and entry time of 2:13.08. Felgueiras failed to advance into the semifinals, as she placed twentieth overall in the preliminaries.
