= Ana Francisco =

Portuguese swimmer

Personal information
- Born: 19 September 1980 (age 45)

Sport
- Sport: Swimming

Ana Francisco (born 19 September 1980) is a Portuguese swimmer. She competed in three events at the 1996 Summer Olympics.
