= Qu Yun (swimmer) =

Chinese swimmer (born 1978)

Personal information
- Born: June 5, 1978 (age 48) Hangzhou, Zhejiang
Medal record
Women's swimming
Representing China
World Championships (LC)
Silver medal – second place	1994 Rome	100 m butterfly
Silver medal – second place	1994 Rome	200 m butterfly
Asian Games
Silver medal – second place	1994 Hiroshima	100m butterfly

Qu Yun (simplified Chinese: 瞿韵; traditional Chinese: 瞿韻; pinyin: Qū Yùn; born June 5, 1978, in Hangzhou, Zhejiang) is a former butterfly stroke swimmer from China. In 1993, she broke the Asian Record in women's 200m butterfly at 2:08.53 in the Chinese National Games, which ranked number 1 in the world in 1993. She also won silver in the 100 m butterfly at 59.27, which ranked number 2 in the world. She competed in 1994 World Aquatics Championships and won silver medals in women's 100 m (59.69) and 200 m butterfly (2:07.40). She finished behind her compatriot, Liu Limin, in both races. The time in 200 m butterfly was her career best. In October, 1994, she set career best in women's 100 m butterfly (58.70) in Asian Games to win silver medal behind Liu Limin. In 1996, she won the Olympic trial in April with a time of 2:09.66 in 200 m butterfly over Liu Limin, and she competed in women's 200 m butterfly at the 1996 Summer Olympics and placed 4th. In 1997, Qu made a comeback and scored a double win (100 butterfly in 59.36 and 200 m butterfly in 2:08.10) in Chinese national Games. Her time in the 200 m butterfly ranked number 2 in the world behind Susan O'Neill. In January, 1998, she competed in the women's 200 m butterfly in 1998 World Aquatics Championships and finished 5th (2:10.49). This was her last appearance in major competition. She retired after the 2001 Chinese National Games.

She obtained her bachelor's degree (human development) and master's degree (sport psychology) at Binghamton University and became an assistant coach in Iowa State University. She then returned to Binghamton University as the associate head coach. She currently is an assistant at Georgia Tech.
