= Annika Mehlhorn =

German swimmer

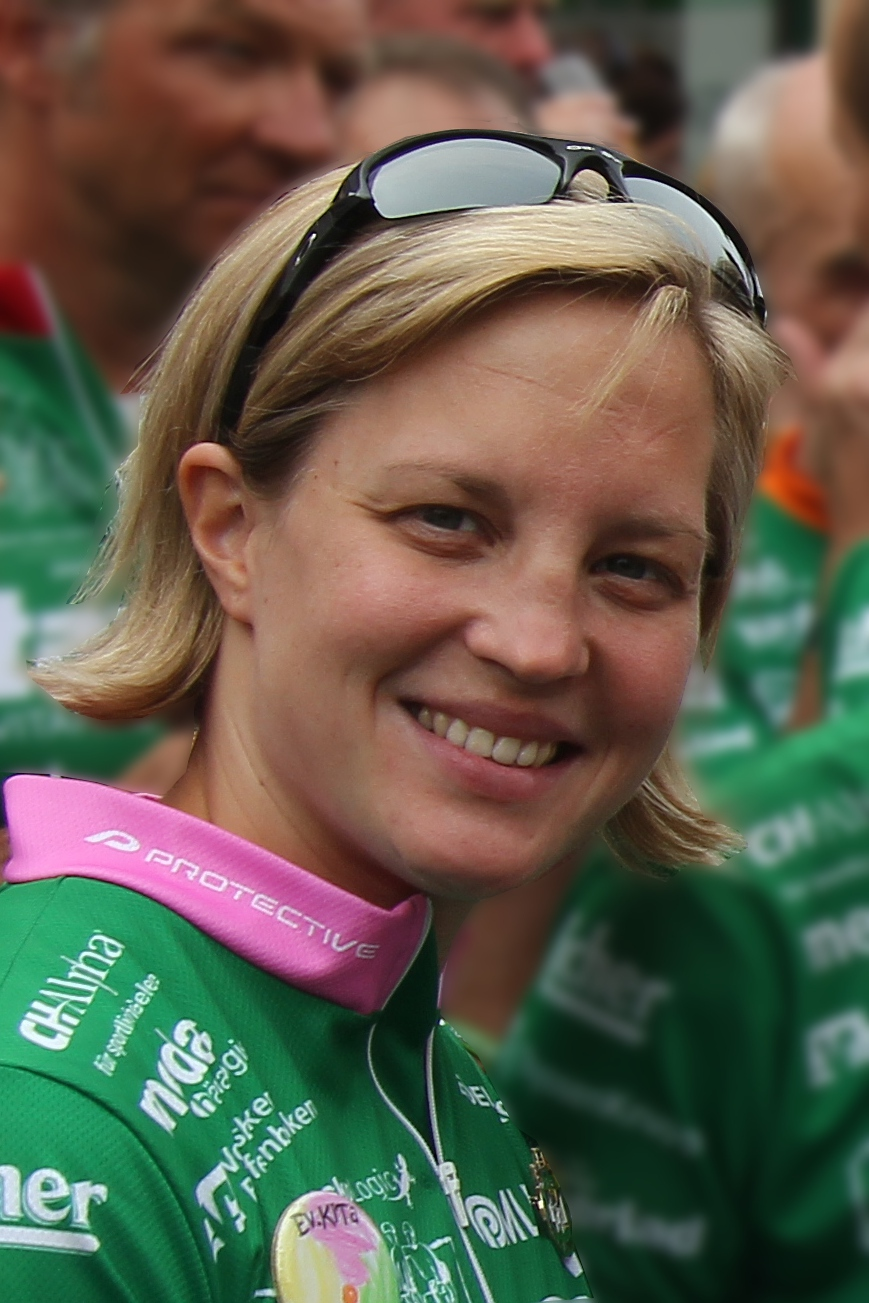
- Mehlhorn in 2012

Personal information
- Born: 5 August 1983 (age 43) Kassel, Hesse, West Germany
- Height: 1.66 m (5 ft 5 in)
- Weight: 60 kg (132 lb)

Sport
- Sport: Swimming
- Club: GSV Eintracht Baunatal in der SG ACT
Medal record
Representing Germany
World Championships (LC)
Silver medal – second place	2001 Fukuoka	200 m butterfly
Bronze medal – third place	2005 Montreal	4×100 m medley
Bronze medal – third place	2009 Rome	4×100 m medley
European Championships (LC)
Silver medal – second place	2006 Budapest	4×100 m medley
Bronze medal – third place	2002 Berlin	200 m butterfly
European Championships (SC)
Gold medal – first place	2000 Valencia	200 m butterfly
Gold medal – first place	2007 Debrecen	4×50 m medley
Silver medal – second place	1999 Lisbon	100 m medley
Silver medal – second place	2000 Valencia	100 m medley
Silver medal – second place	2000 Valencia	400 m medley
Bronze medal – third place	2007 Debrecen	200 m butterfly

Annika Mehlhorn (born 5 August 1983) is a butterfly and medley swimmer from Germany. She competed at the 2004 Summer Olympics in the 200 m butterfly, but failed to reach the final. She became European champion in the 200 m butterfly at the European Short Course Swimming Championships 2000 in Valencia. At the same event Mehlhorn won the silver medal at the 2001 World Aquatics Championships in Fukuoka, Japan.

== See also ==
- German records in swimming
