= Liu Yin (swimmer) =

Chinese swimmer (born 1984)

Personal information
- Born: September 5, 1984 (age 41)

Sport
- Sport: Swimming
Medal record
Representing China
Asian Games
Bronze medal – third place	2002 Busan	200m butterfly

Liu Yin (simplified Chinese: 刘茵; traditional Chinese: 劉茵; pinyin: Liú Yīn, born 5 September 1984) is a Chinese former butterfly and medley swimmer who competed in the 2000 Summer Olympics.
