= Bárbara Franco =

Spanish swimmer (born 1974)

Bárbara Andrea Franco-Borges
Personal information
- Full name: Bárbara Andrea Franco-Borges
- National team: Spain
- Born: 4 April 1974 (age 52) Madrid, Spain
- Height: 1.70 m (5 ft 7 in)
- Weight: 55 kg (121 lb)

Sport
- Sport: Swimming
- Strokes: Butterfly
- Club: Real Canoe NC
- College team: University of Florida (U.S.)
Medal record
Women's swimming
Representing Spain
European Championships (LC)
Bronze medal – third place	1993 Sheffield	200 m butterfly
European Championships (SC)
Gold medal – first place	1996 Rostock	200 m butterfly

Bárbara Andrea Franco Solana Borges (born 4 April 1974) is a former competition swimmer who represented Spain at two consecutive Summer Olympics.

== Early years ==
Franco was born in Madrid. She is the older sister of Olympic swimmer Claudia Franco. Both sisters attended Mission Viejo High School in Mission Viejo, California, where they swam for the Mission Viejo high school swim team.

== College career ==
Franco attended the University of Florida in Gainesville, Florida, where she swam for the Florida Gators swimming and diving team in National Collegiate Athletic Association (NCAA) competition from 1992 to 1996. During her four-year college career, she received four All-America honors and won two individual Southeastern Conference (SEC) championships in the 200-meter butterfly event.

== International career ==
At the 1992 Summer Olympics in Barcelona, Spain, Franco competed in the women's 100-meter butterfly and finished twenty-sixth. She won the gold medal in the 200-meter butterfly at the European Short Course Swimming Championships 1996 in Rostock, Germany. At the 1996 Summer Olympics in Atlanta, Georgia, she was again a member of the Spanish Olympic team, and finished sixteenth in the 200-meter butterfly.

== Personal ==
Franco is married to Brazilian swimmer Gustavo Borges, who she met in 1992 and started dating four years later prior to the Olympics. Franco has since moved to São Paulo, where she is a teacher in an international school and lives with her two children, both of whom have started swimming for Esporte Clube Pinheiros.

== See also ==
- List of University of Florida alumni
- List of University of Florida Olympians
