= Vered Borochovski =

Israeli swimmer (born 1984)

Personal information
- Native name: ורד בורוכובסקי
- Full name: Vered Borochovski
- Nationality: Israel
- Born: 27 August 1984 (age 41) Ashdod, Israel

Sport
- Sport: Swimming
- Club: Maccabi Ashdod
Medal record
Representing Israel
World Championships (SC)
Bronze medal – third place	2002 Moscow	50 m butterfly
European Championships (SC)
Bronze medal – third place	2002 Riesa	50 m butterfly

Vered Borochovski (Hebrew: ורד בורוכובסקי; born 27 August 1984) is a former Israeli swimmer who represented Israel at the 2000 and 2004 Summer Olympics. She swam without her goggles at the 2004 Olympics, because they had a torn strap.

She also holds three Israeli swimming records.

In December 2002 she competed at the Jerusalem Cup. She swam a time of 27.38 in the 50m fly.

== Currently held records ==
Record	Distance	Event	Time	Location	Date
Israeli	200 m (lc)	Butterfly	2:14.24	Fukuoka, Japan	2001, 22 July
Israeli	200 m (lc)	Individual Medley	2:17.31	Netanya, Israel	2000, 9 August
Israeli	400 m (lc)	Individual Medley	4:52.58	Netanya, Israel	2000, 9 August
