= Tinka Dančević =

Croatian swimmer

Personal information
- Full name: Tinka Dančević
- Nationality: Croatia
- Born: 20 March 1980 (age 46) Zagreb

Sport
- Sport: Swimming
- Strokes: Butterfly

Tinka Dančević (born 20 March 1980 in Zagreb) is a retired butterfly swimmer from Croatia, who twice competed for her native country in the women's 200 metre butterfly event at the Summer Olympics: in 1996 and 2000.
