= Freestyle swimming =

Category of swimming competition

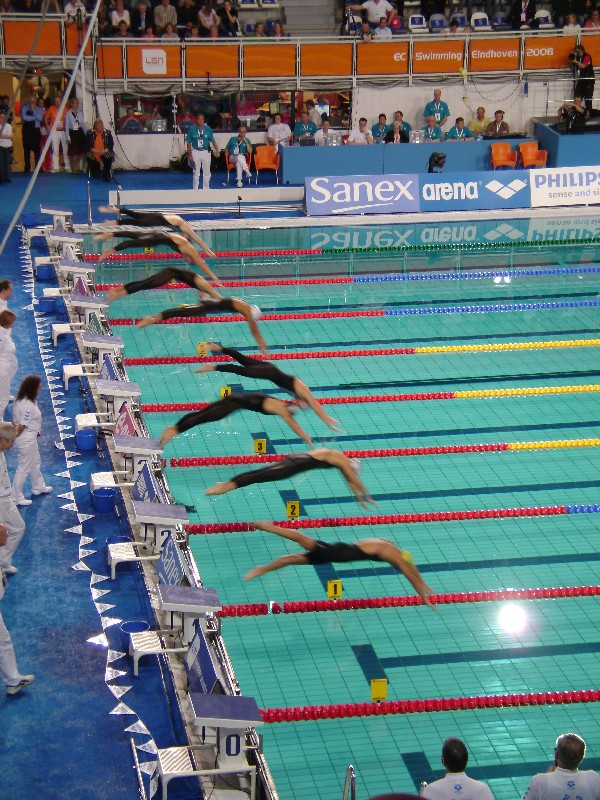
Start of the women's 400 m freestyle at the 2008 European Championships

Freestyle is a category of swimming competition, defined by the rules of World Aquatics, in which competitors are subject to only a few limited restrictions on their swimming stroke. Freestyle races are the most common of all swimming competitions, with distances beginning with 50 meters (55 yards) and reaching 1,500 meters (1,600 yards), also known as the mile. The term 'freestyle stroke' is sometimes used as a synonym for 'front crawl', as the front crawl is the fastest surface swimming stroke. It is now the most common stroke used in freestyle competitions.

The first Olympic swimming events were freestyle, contested in open water from the first Olympic Games, and in a swimming pool from the 1908 Games onward.

== Technique ==
Freestyle swimming implies the use of legs and arms for competitive swimming, with few restrictions, except in the case of the individual medley or medley relay events. The front crawl is most commonly chosen by swimmers, as this provides the greatest speed. During a race, the competitor circles the arms forward in alternation, kicking the feet up and down (flutter kick). Individual freestyle events can also be swum using one of the officially regulated strokes (breaststroke, butterfly, or backstroke). For the freestyle part of medley swimming competitions, however, one cannot use breaststroke, butterfly, or backstroke. Front crawl is based on the Trudgen that was improved by Richmond Cavill from Sydney, Australia. Cavill developed the stroke by observing a young boy from the Solomon Islands, Alick Wickham. Cavill and his brothers spread the Australian crawl to England, New Zealand and America, creating the freestyle used worldwide today. During the Olympic Games, front crawl is swum almost exclusively during freestyle. Some of the few rules state that swimmers must touch the end of the pool during each length, cannot push off the bottom in the direction of the race, and cannot pull on the lane lines during the course of the race. However, other than this any form or variation of strokes is considered legal with the race. As with all competitive events, false starts can lead to disqualification of the swimmer.

== New developments in the sport ==
Times have consistently dropped over the years due to better training techniques and to new developments in the sport.

In the first four Olympics, swimming competitions were not held in pools, but in open water (1896 – the Bay of Zea, 1900 – the Seine river, 1904 – an artificial lake in Forest Park, 1906 – Neo Faliro). The 1904 Olympics freestyle race was the only one ever measured at 100 yards, instead of the usual 100 meters. A 100-meter pool was built for the 1908 Olympics and sat in the center of the main stadium's track and field oval. The 1912 Olympics, held in the Stockholm harbor, marked the beginning of electronic timing.

Male swimmers wore full body suits up until the 1940s, which caused more drag in the water than their modern swimwear counterparts. Also, over the years, some design considerations have reduced swimming resistance, making the pool faster, namely: proper pool depth, elimination of currents, increased lane width, energy-absorbing racing lane lines and gutters, and the use of other innovative hydraulic, acoustic, and illumination designs.

The 1924 Olympics was the first to use the standard 50 meter pool with marked lanes. In freestyle events, swimmers originally dove from the pool walls, but diving blocks were eventually incorporated at the 1936 Olympics. The flip turn was developed in the 1950s, resulting in faster times. Lane design created in the early 1970s has also cut down turbulence in water, aiding in the more dynamic pool used today.

== Rules and regulation ==
Freestyle means "any style" for individual swims and any style but breaststroke, butterfly, or backstroke for both the individual medley, and medley relay competitions. The wall has to be touched at every turn and upon completion. Some part of the swimmer must be above water at any time, except for the first 15 meters after the start and every turn. This rule was introduced (see History of swimming) to prevent swimmers from using the faster underwater swimming, such as the fish kick, to their advantage, or even swimming entire laps underwater. The exact FINA rules are:

- Freestyle means that in an event so designated the swimmer may swim any style, except that in individual medley or medley relay events, freestyle means any style other than backstroke, breaststroke, or butterfly.
- Some part of the swimmer must touch the wall upon completion of each length and at the finish.
- Some part of the swimmer must break the surface of the water throughout the race, except it shall be permissible for the swimmer to be completely submerged during the turn and for a distance of not more than 15 meters after the start and each turn. By that point the head must have broken the surface.

== Competitions ==
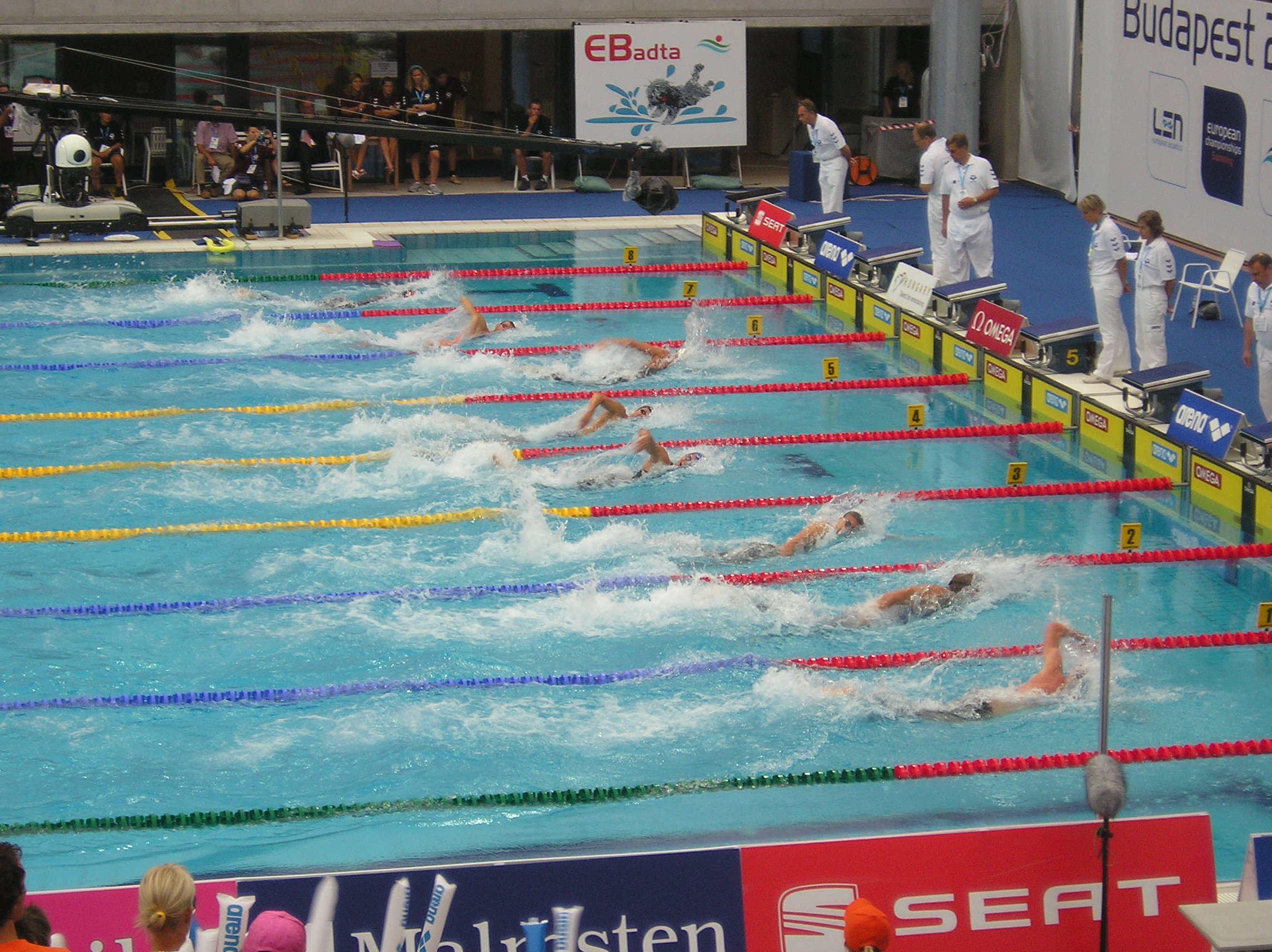
Men's 100 m freestyle at the 2006 Euros

There are nine competitions used in freestyle swimming, both using either a long time (50 meter) or a short time (25 meter) pool. The United States also employs short time yards (25 yard pool). In the United States, it is common for swimmers to compete in a 25-yard pool during the Fall, Winter, and Spring, and then switch over to a 50-meter pool format during the Summer.

- 50 m freestyle (50 yards for short time yards)
- 100 m freestyle (100 yards for short time yards)
- 200 m freestyle (200 yards for short time yards)
- 400 m freestyle (500 yards for short time yards)
- 800 m freestyle (1000 yards for short time yards)
- 1500 m freestyle (1650 yards for short time yards)
- 4 × 50 m freestyle relay (4 x 50 yards for short time yards)
- 4 × 100 m freestyle relay (4 × 100 yards for short time yards)
- 4 × 200 m freestyle relay (4 × 200 yards for short time yards)

Young swimmers (typically 8 years old and younger) have the option to swim a 25 yard/meter freestyle event.

Freestyle is also part of the medley over the following distances:

- 100 m individual medley (short 25 m pool only)
- 200 m individual medley (200 yard individual medley in short time yards)
- 400 m individual medley (400 yards individual medley in short time yards)
- 4 × 100 m medley relay (4 × 100 yard medley relay in short time yards)
- 4 × 200 m medley relay (4 × 200 yard medley relay in short time yards)

In the long-distance races of the 800 and 1,500 meters (870 and 1,640 yards), some meets hosted by FINA (including the Olympics) only have the 800 meters (870 yards) distance for women and the 1,500 meters (1,600 yards) distance for men. However, FINA does keep records in the 1,500 meters (1,600 yards) distance for women and the 800 meters (870 yards) distance for men, and the FINA World Championships, as well as many other meets, have both distances for both sexes.

== See also ==
- 100 metre freestyle
- List of world records in swimming
- History of swimming
- Special Olympics
- Olympics
