= Katrin Jäke =

German swimmer

Personal information
- Born: 1975 (age 50–51)

Sport
- Sport: Swimming
- Club: Leipzig (1990); Burghausen (1991); SC Riesa (1991, 1998–2001); SC DHfK Leipzig (1993–1997)
Medal record
Swimming
Representing Germany
European Championships (LC)
Silver medal – second place	1993 Sheffield	200 m butterfly
World Championships (SC)
Silver medal – second place	2000 Athens	200 m butterfly
Silver medal – second place	2000 Athens	4×100 m m relay

Katrin Jäke (born c. 1975) is a retired German butterfly swimmer who won three silver medals at the 1993 European Aquatics Championships and 2000 FINA World Swimming Championships (25 m). Between 1990 and 1999 she won 12 national titles in butterfly events.
