= Anna Uryniuk =

Polish swimmer

Personal information
- Full name: Anna Uryniuk
- Nationality: Poland
- Born: 8 February 1974 (age 52) Włodawa, Lubelskie
- Height: 1.74 m (5 ft 9 in)
- Weight: 68 kg (150 lb)

Sport
- Sport: Swimming
- Strokes: Butterfly
- Club: Wisła Puławy
Medal record
Women's swimming
Representing Poland
Summer Universiade
Gold medal – first place	1997 Catania	200 m butterfly

Anna Uryniuk (born 8 February 1974) is a retired butterfly swimmer from Poland, who competed in three consecutive Summer Olympics for her native country, starting in 1992.
