= María Peláez =

Spanish swimmer (born 1977)

Personal information
- Full name: María Peláez Navarrete
- Nationality: Spanish
- Born: 13 November 1977 (age 48) Málaga, Andalusia, Spain

Sport
- Sport: Swimming
Medal record
Women's swimming
Representing Spain
European Championships (LC)
Gold medal – first place	1997 Seville	200 m butterfly
Silver medal – second place	1999 Istanbul	200 m butterfly
Bronze medal – third place	1995 Vienna	4×100 m medley
European Championships (SC)
Bronze medal – third place	1996 Rostock	200 m butterfly
Summer Universiade
Gold medal – first place	1999 Mallorca	200 m butterfly

María Peláez Navarrete (Note: In this Spanish name, the first or paternal surname is Peláez and the second or maternal family name is Navarrete.) (born 13 November 1977 in Málaga, Andalusia) is a former butterfly swimmer from Spain, who competed at five consecutive Summer Olympics for her native country, starting in 1992. She won the silver medal in the 200 m butterfly at the 1999 European Aquatics Championships in Istanbul, Turkey, after gaining the title in the same event, two years earlier at the European Championships in Seville, Spain.
