= Sophia Skou =

Danish swimmer

Medal record

Representing Denmark

Women's swimming

World Championships (SC)
Bronze medal – third place	1999 Hong Kong	200 m butterfly

European Championships (LC)
Bronze medal – third place	1995 Vienna	200 m butterfly

European Championships (SC)
Gold medal – first place	1998 Sheffield	200 m butterfly
Bronze medal – third place	1999 Lisbon	100 m butterfly
Bronze medal – third place	1999 Lisbon	200 m butterfly

Sophia Skou (born 1 December 1975 in Copenhagen) is a Danish former butterfly swimmer, who twice competed in the Summer Olympics for her native country: in 1996 and 2000.

Skou was Denmark's leading swimmer in the 1990s, together with Mette Jacobsen. Skou was mainly successful in the short course (25m) events, although she won the bronze medal in the 200m butterfly at the European LC Championships 1995 in Vienna, Austria.
