= Cécile Jeanson =

French swimmer

Personal information
- Born: 17 August 1972 (age 54) Perpignan, France
- Height: 173 cm (5 ft 8 in)
- Weight: 62 kg (137 lb)

Sport
- Sport: Swimming
Medal record
Representing France
Mediterranean Games
Gold medal – first place	1991 Athens	100m butterfly
Gold medal – first place	1993 Mende	200m butterfly
Gold medal – first place	1993 Mende	4x100m medley relay
Silver medal – second place	1993 Mende	100m butterfly
Bronze medal – third place	1991 Athens	4x100m medley relay
European Championships
Bronze medal – third place	1995 Vienna	100m butterfly

Cécile Jeanson (born 17 August 1972) is a French former swimmer who competed in the 1992 Summer Olympics, in the 1996 Summer Olympics, and in the 2000 Summer Olympics.
