= Swimming at the 2012 European Aquatics Championships – Women's 100 metre butterfly =

Women's 100 metre butterfly at the 2012 European Aquatics Championships
- Dates: May 24, 2012 (heats and semifinals); May 25, 2012 (final)
- Competitors: 39 from 20 nations
- Winning time: 58.04

Medalists
gold medal	Ingvild Snildal	Norway
silver medal	Martina Granström	Sweden
bronze medal	Amit Ivri	Israel

The women's 100 metre butterfly competition of the swimming events at the 2012 European Aquatics Championships took place May 24 and 25. The heats and semifinals took place on May 24, the final on May 25.

== Records ==
Prior to the competition, the existing world, European and championship records were as follows.

	Name	Nation	Time	Location	Date
World record European record	Sarah Sjöström	Sweden	56.06	Rome	July 27, 2009
Championship record	Martina Moravcová	Slovakia	57.20	Berlin	August 2, 2002

== Results ==
=== Heats ===
39 swimmers participated in 5 heats.

Rank	Heat	Lane	Name	Nationality	Time	Notes
1	3	4	Ilaria Bianchi	Italy	58.31	Q
2	5	4	Ingvild Snildal	Norway	58.41	Q
3	5	3	Amit Ivri	Israel	58.64	Q
4	5	5	Martina Granström	Sweden	58.84	Q
5	5	7	Silvia Di Pietro	Italy	58.86	Q
6	4	4	Kristel Vourna	Greece	58.96	Q
7	2	5	Liliána Szilágyi	Hungary	59.07	Q
8	2	3	Denisa Smolenová	Slovakia	59.14	Q
9	4	3	Zsuzsanna Jakabos	Hungary	59.18	Q
10	4	2	Alexandra Wenk	Germany	59.39	
11	4	6	Orsolya Tompa	Hungary	59.43	
12	3	8	Danielle Carmen Villars	Switzerland	59.57	Q, NR
13	5	6	Emilia Pikkarainen	Finland	59.61	Q
14	3	3	Sina Sutter	Germany	59.62	Q
15	3	5	Birgit Koschischek	Austria	59.64	Q
16	3	7	Eszter Dara	Hungary	59.75	
17	5	1	Theresa Michalak	Germany	59.78	
18	4	5	Elena Di Liddo	Italy	1:00.08	
19	3	6	Sara Freitas Oliveira	Portugal	1:00.11	Q
20	5	8	Franziska Hentke	Germany	1:00.12	
21	4	1	Triin Aljand	Estonia	1:00.25	
22	5	2	Judit Ignacio Sorribes	Spain	1:00.41	Q
23	3	1	Maria Ugolkova	Russia	1:00.48	Q
24	2	6	Daria Tcvetkova	Russia	1:00.55	
25	3	2	Justine Bruno	France	1:00.75	
26	4	8	Katarina Listopadová	Slovakia	1:00.96	
27	4	7	Louise Hansson	Sweden	1:01.00	
28	2	4	Sarah Blake Bateman	Iceland	1:01.01	
29	2	1	Vaiva Gimbutytė	Lithuania	1:01.52	
30	1	3	Maria Novikova	Russia	1:02.10	
31	2	7	Annika Saarnak	Estonia	1:02.20	
32	2	8	Ayse Ezgi Yazici	Turkey	1:02.24	
33	1	5	Jasmin Rosenberger	Turkey	1:02.83	
34	1	4	Monica Johannessen	Norway	1:03.81	
35	1	7	Laura Kurki	Finland	1:03.87	
36	1	2	Anna Santamans	France	1:04.03	
37	1	6	Emilie Loevberg	Norway	1:04.08	
38	1	1	Simona Muccioli	San Marino	1:05.65	
	2	2	Bethany Carson	Ireland	DNS	

=== Semifinals ===
The eight fastest swimmers advanced to the final.

==== Semifinal 1 ====
Rank	Lane	Name	Nationality	Time	Notes
2	4	Ingvild Snildal	Norway	58.07	Q
2	5	Martina Granström	Sweden	58.39	Q
3	3	Kristel Vourna	Greece	58.79	Q
4	6	Denisa Smolenová	Slovakia	59.18	Q
5	7	Sina Sutter	Germany	59.52	
6	1	Sara Freitas Oliveira	Portugal	59.79	
7	8	Maria Ugolkova	Russia	1:00.09	
8	2	Danielle Carmen Villars	Switzerland	1:00.14	

==== Semifinal 2 ====
Rank	Lane	Name	Nationality	Time	Notes
1	3	Silvia Di Pietro	Italy	58.84	Q
2	2	Zsuzsanna Jakabos	Hungary	58.90	Q
3	5	Amit Ivri	Israel	59.01	Q
4	6	Liliána Szilágyi	Hungary	59.49	Q
5	1	Birgit Koschischek	Austria	59.70	
6	7	Emilia Pikkarainen	Finland	59.71	
7	8	Judit Ignacio Sorribes	Spain	1:00.12	
	4	Ilaria Bianchi	Italy	58.28	DSQ

=== Final ===
The final was held at 18:10.

Rank	Lane	Name	Nationality	Time	Notes
1st place, gold medalist(s)	4	Ingvild Snildal	Norway	58.04	
2nd place, silver medalist(s)	5	Martina Granström	Sweden	58.07	
3rd place, bronze medalist(s)	7	Amit Ivri	Israel	58.78	
4	6	Silvia Di Pietro	Italy	58.95	
5	3	Kristel Vourna	Greece	58.98	
6	2	Zsuzsanna Jakabos	Hungary	59.06	
7	1	Denisa Smolenová	Slovakia	59.24	
8	8	Liliána Szilágyi	Hungary	59.76	
