= 2010 FINA World Swimming Championships (25 m) – Women's 100 metre butterfly =

Women's 100m Butterfly at the 2010 Short Course Worlds
- Dates: 18 December 2010 (heats and semifinals); 19 December 2010 (final)
- Competitors: 61
- Winning time: 55.43

Medalists
gold medal	Felicity Galvez	Australia
silver medal	Therese Alshammar	Sweden
bronze medal	Dana Vollmer	United States

The Women's 100 Butterfly at the 10th FINA World Swimming Championships (25m) took place 18–19 December 2010 in Dubai, United Arab Emirates. The heats and semifinals were swum 18 December; the final on 19 December.

61 individuals swam the event.

== Records ==
Prior to the competition, the existing world and championship records were as follows.

	Name	Nation	Time	Location	Date
World record	Diane Bui Duyet	France	55.05	Istanbul	12 December 2009
Championship record	Felicity Galvez	Australia	55.89	Manchester	13 April 2008

The following records were established during the competition:

Date	Round	Name	Nation	Time	WR	CR
19 December 2010	Final	Felicity Galvez	Australia	55.43		CR

== Results ==
=== Heats ===
Rank	Heat	Lane	Name	Time	Notes
1	6	4	Inge Dekker (NED)	56.69	Q
2	7	4	Dana Vollmer (USA)	56.72	Q
3	7	5	Felicity Galvez (AUS)	56.89	Q
4	7	3	Christine Magnuson (USA)	56.90	Q
4	8	5	Jeanette Ottesen (DEN)	56.90	Q
6	1	6	Liu Zige (CHN)	56.98	Q
7	7	6	Amit Ivri (ISR)	57.14	Q
8	8	4	Therese Alshammar (SWE)	57.15	Q
9	6	3	Jemma Lowe (GBR)	57.40	Q
10	8	6	Sarah Sjöström (SWE)	57.68	Q
11	1	2	Lu Ying (CHN)	58.02	Q
12	7	7	Alessia Polieri (ITA)	58.05	Q
13	6	7	Katerine Savard (CAN)	58.16	Q
14	6	8	Arianna Vanderpool-Wallace (BAH)	58.21	Q
15	7	8	Sara Oliveira (POR)	58.31	Q
16	8	2	Sze Hang Yu (HKG)	58.33	Q
17	6	5	Ingvild Snildal (NOR)	58.57	
18	5	2	Mélanie Henique (FRA)	58.58	
19	8	3	Eszter Dara (HUN)	58.68	
20	8	1	Annika Saarnak (EST)	58.70	
21	5	5	Audrey Lacroix (CAN)	58.73	
22	6	2	Zsuzsanna Jakabos (HUN)	58.82	
23	6	1	Iris Rosenberger (TUR)	59.03	
24	8	7	Mandy Loots (RSA)	59.05	
25	7	1	Melanie Schweiger (SUI)	59.07	
26	7	2	Caterina Giacchetti (ITA)	59.27	
27	5	6	Katja Hajdinjak (SLO)	59.45	
28	5	4	Katarina Listopadova (SVK)	59.63	
29	5	3	Hiroko Sugino (JPN)	59.67	
30	5	7	Svetlana Fedulova (RUS)	59.74	
31	6	6	Chen Wan-Jung (TPE)	59.91	
32	8	8	Daniele de Jesus (BRA)	1:00.28	
33	4	5	Lisa Zaiser (AUT)	1:00.29	
34	4	4	Martina van Berkel (SUI)	1:00.39	
35	4	6	Erika Torrellas (VEN)	1:00.59	
36	4	8	Meagan Lim (SIN)	1:01.23	
37	5	8	Jasmin Rosenberger (TUR)	1:01.29	
38	4	3	Elimar Barrios (VEN)	1:01.30	
39	5	1	Ting Sheng-Yo (TPE)	1:01.70	
40	4	2	Diana Luna Sánchez (MEX)	1:01.94	
41	3	6	Patarawadee Kittiya (THA)	1:02.01	
42	4	7	Farida Osman (EGY)	1:02.15	
43	3	4	Oriele Alejandra Espinoza (PER)	1:02.55	
44	3	7	Marie Laura Meza (CRC)	1:03.18	
45	3	8	Karen Torrez (BOL)	1:03.21	NR
46	3	5	Ma Cheok Mei (MAC)	1:04.12	
47	3	2	Sherazade Amanda Ramond (MAR)	1:05.24	
48	3	1	Davina Mangion (MLT)	1:06.97	
49	2	4	Dalia Torrez (NCA)	1:07.19	
50	1	7	Ri Hyon Gyong (PRK)	1:07.74	
51	2	5	Carolina Alejandra Aguilar (PER)	1:07.87	
52	2	6	Emily Chan Chee (MRI)	1:08.34	
53	2	2	Tieri Erasito (FIJ)	1:08.42	
54	2	3	Shannon Austin (SEY)	1:08.51	
55	3	3	Kiran Khan (PAK)	1:08.96	
56	2	7	Judith Ilan Meauri (PNG)	1:11.21	
57	2	8	Anham Salyani (KEN)	1:14.89	
58	1	4	Soraya Oruya (KEN)	1:16.83	
59	2	1	Ann-Marie Hepler (MHL)	1:19.06	
-	1	3	Gouri Jayesh Kumar Kotecha (TAN)	DNS	
-	4	1	Monica Waage Johannessen (NOR)	DNS	

=== Semifinals ===
Semifinal 1

Rank	Lane	Name	Time	Notes
1	6	Therese Alshammar (SWE)	55.99	Q
2	5	Christine Magnuson (USA)	56.55	Q
3	3	Liu Zige (CHN)	56.63	Q
4	4	Dana Vollmer (USA)	57.00	Q
5	2	Sarah Sjöström (SWE)	57.31	
6	7	Alessia Polieri (ITA)	58.19	
7	8	Ingvild Snildal (NOR)	58.65	
8	1	Sara Oliveira (POR)	58.72	

Semifinal 2

Rank	Lane	Name	Time	Notes
1	5	Felicity Galvez (AUS)	56.19	Q
2	3	Jeanette Ottesen (DEN)	56.74	Q
3	4	Inge Dekker (NED)	56.85	Q
4	7	Lu Ying (CHN)	56.99	Q
5	2	Jemma Lowe (GBR)	57.18	
6	6	Amit Ivri (ISR)	57.22	
7	1	Katerine Savard (CAN)	57.87	
8	8	Sze Hang Yu (HKG)	58.11	

=== Final ===
Rank	Lane	Name	Time	Notes
1st place, gold medalist(s)	5	Felicity Galvez (AUS)	55.43	CR
2nd place, silver medalist(s)	4	Therese Alshammar (SWE)	55.73	
3rd place, bronze medalist(s)	8	Dana Vollmer (USA)	56.25	
4	6	Liu Zige (CHN)	56.61	
5	1	Lu Ying (CHN)	56.62	
6	2	Jeanette Ottesen (DEN)	56.67	
7	3	Christine Magnuson (USA)	56.98	
8	7	Inge Dekker (NED)	57.46	
