= Swimming at the 2012 European Aquatics Championships – Women's 50 metre butterfly =

Women's 50 metre butterfly at the 2012 European Aquatics Championships
- Dates: May 21, 2012 (heats and semifinals); May 22, 2012 (final)
- Competitors: 47 from 28 nations
- Winning time: 25.64

Medalists
gold medal	Sarah Sjöström	Sweden
silver medal	Triin Aljand	Estonia
bronze medal	Ingvild Snildal	Norway

The women's 50 metre butterfly competition of the swimming events at the 2012 European Aquatics Championships took place May 21 and 22. The heats and semifinals took place on May 21, the final on May 22.

== Records ==
Prior to the competition, the existing world, European and championship records were as follows.

	Name	Nation	Time	Location	Date
World record European record	Therese Alshammar	Sweden	25.07	Rome	July 31, 2009
Championship record	Therese Alshammar	Sweden	25.50	Budapest	August 9, 2010

== Results ==
=== Heats ===
47 swimmers participated in 6 heats.

Rank	Heat	Lane	Name	Nationality	Time	Notes
1	6	4	Sarah Sjöström	Sweden	26.48	Q
2	4	5	Ingvild Snildal	Norway	26.55	Q
3	5	4	Hinkelien Schreuder	Netherlands	26.70	Q
4	4	4	Triin Aljand	Estonia	26.72	Q
4	6	2	Anna Dowgiert	Poland	26.72	Q
6	4	6	Kristel Vourna	Greece	26.79	Q
7	4	2	Ilaria Bianchi	Italy	26.80	Q
7	5	3	Silvia di Pietro	Italy	26.80	Q
9	4	3	Sviatlana Khakhlova	Belarus	26.92	Q
10	6	3	Nadiya Koba	Ukraine	27.03	Q
11	5	6	Louise Hansson	Sweden	27.07	Q
12	3	4	Eszter Dara	Hungary	27.19	Q
13	6	5	Amit Ivri	Israel	27.20	Q
13	6	6	Sina Sutter	Germany	27.20	Q
15	1	2	Martina Moravcová	Slovakia	27.21	Q
16	5	8	Danielle Carmen Villars	Switzerland	27.30	Q
17	5	5	Daria Tcvetkova	Russia	27.32	
18	1	7	Annika Saarnak	Estonia	27.35	
19	6	7	Emilia Pikkarainen	Finland	27.37	
20	2	5	Orsolya Tompa	Hungary	27.38	
21	5	2	Datya Stepanyuk	Ukraine	27.52	
21	6	1	Fabienne Nadarajah	Austria	27.52	
23	4	7	Maria Ugolkova	Russia	27.59	
24	4	1	Lisa Zaiser	Austria	27.64	
25	6	8	Sarah Blake Bateman	Iceland	27.67	
26	3	1	Katarína Milly	Slovakia	27.72	
27	5	7	Katharina Stiberg	Norway	27.80	
28	3	6	Valery Svigir	Croatia	27.81	
29	4	8	Gabriela Ņikitina	Latvia	27.91	
30	3	8	Monica Johannessen	Norway	27.95	
31	3	5	Katarina Listopadová	Slovakia	27.98	
32	5	1	Sara Freitas Oliveira	Portugal	28.18	
33	3	2	Liliána Szilágyi	Hungary	28.26	
34	3	3	Ayse Ezgi Yazici	Turkey	28.28	
35	3	7	Eva Chavez-Diaz	Austria	28.36	
36	1	1	Klára Václavíková	Czech Republic	28.41	
37	2	6	Bethany Carson	Ireland	28.43	
38	2	4	Sara Joo	Hungary	28.55	
39	2	2	Vaiva Gimbutytė	Lithuania	28.70	
40	2	1	Emilie N Løvberg	Norway	28.83	
41	1	4	Maria Novikova	Russia	29.02	
41	2	8	Tatiana Perstniova	Moldova	29.02	
43	2	7	Aneta Pechancova	Czech Republic	29.12	
44	2	3	Ingibjörg Kristin Jónsdóttir	Iceland	29.40	
45	1	5	Desiree Felner	Austria	29.46	
46	1	6	Birita Debes	Faroe Islands	29.93	
47	1	3	Milica Marković	Montenegro	30.35	

=== Semifinals ===
The eight fastest swimmers advanced to the final.

==== Semifinal 1 ====
Rank	Lane	Name	Nationality	Time	Notes
1	5	Triin Aljand	Estonia	26.20	Q
2	4	Ingvild Snildal	Norway	26.39	Q
3	6	Silvia di Pietro	Italy	26.61	Q
4	3	Kristel Vourna	Greece	26.63	Q, NR
5	2	Nadiya Koba	Ukraine	26.92	
6	1	Sina Sutter	Germany	27.02	
7	7	Eszter Dara	Hungary	27.04	
8	8	Danielle Carmen Villars	Switzerland	27.28	

==== Semifinal 2 ====
Rank	Lane	Name	Nationality	Time	Notes
1	4	Sarah Sjöström	Sweden	26.22	Q
2	3	Anna Dowgiert	Poland	26.36	Q, NR
3	6	Ilaria Bianchi	Italy	26.65	Q
4	1	Amit Ivri	Israel	26.68	Q
5	7	Louise Hansson	Sweden	26.72	
6	5	Hinkelien Schreuder	Netherlands	26.73	
7	2	Sviatlana Khakhlova	Belarus	26.80	
8	8	Martina Moravcová	Slovakia	27.02	

=== Final ===
The final was held at 17:18.

Rank	Lane	Name	Nationality	Time	Notes
1st place, gold medalist(s)	5	Sarah Sjöström	Sweden	25.64	
2nd place, silver medalist(s)	4	Triin Aljand	Estonia	25.92	NR
3rd place, bronze medalist(s)	6	Ingvild Snildal	Norway	26.12	
4	3	Anna Dowgiert	Poland	26.38	
5	2	Silvia di Pietro	Italy	26.44	
6	7	Kristel Vourna	Greece	26.52	NR
7	1	Ilaria Bianchi	Italy	26.55	
8	8	Amit Ivri	Israel	26.77	
