= Swimming at the 2014 European Aquatics Championships – Women's 200 metre butterfly =

Women's 200 Metre Butterfly at the Swimming at the 2014 European Aquatics Championships
- Dates: 23–24 August
- Competitors: 25 from 16 nations
- Winning time: 2:04.79

Medalists
gold medal	Mireia Belmonte	Spain
silver medal	Judit Ignacio Sorribes	Spain
bronze medal	Katinka Hosszú	Hungary

The Women's 200 metre butterfly competition of the 2014 European Aquatics Championships was held on 23–24 August.

== Records ==
Prior to the competition, the existing world, European and championship records were as follows.

	Name	Nation	Time	Location	Date
World record	Liu Zige	China	2:01.81	Jinan	20 October 2009
European record	Katinka Hosszú	Hungary	2:04.27	Rome	29 July 2009
Championship record	Otylia Jędrzejczak	Poland	2:05.78	Berlin	4 August 2002

== Results ==
=== Heats ===
The heats were held at 09:51.

Rank	Heat	Lane	Name	Nationality	Time	Notes
1	3	4	Mireia Belmonte	Spain	2:08.41	Q
2	1	4	Zsuzsanna Jakabos	Hungary	2:08.73	Q
3	1	6	Martina van Berkel	Switzerland	2:08.81	Q
4	2	4	Katinka Hosszú	Hungary	2:08.91	Q
5	3	5	Judit Ignacio Sorribes	Spain	2:09.21	Q
6	2	5	Franziska Hentke	Germany	2:10.60	Q
7	2	7	Anja Klinar	Slovenia	2:10.63	Q
8	2	3	Evelyn Verrasztó	Hungary	2:10.97	
9	3	3	Aimee Willmott	Great Britain	2:11.56	Q (DNS)
10	1	2	Lara Grangeon	France	2:11.64	Q
11	3	6	Alessia Polieri	Italy	2:11.77	Q
12	1	3	Jemma Lowe	Great Britain	2:11.86	Q
13	1	7	Keren Siebner	Israel	2:12.19	Q
14	1	5	Stefania Pirozzi	Italy	2:12.36	Q
15	3	7	Marie Wattel	France	2:12.68	Q
16	3	2	Danielle Villars	Switzerland	2:12.70	Q
17	2	2	Yana Martynova	Russia	2:13.66	Q
18	3	1	Barbora Závadová	Czech Republic	2:13.71	Q (Sub)
19	3	0	Sycerika McMahon	Ireland	2:13.75	
20	2	6	Sharon Rouwendaal	Netherlands	2:14.10	
21	2	1	Tanja Kylliaeinen	Finland	2:16.56	
22	2	8	Bianca Izabella	Romania	2:17.80	
23	3	8	Isabelle Mabboux	France	2:18.57	
24	1	8	Lisa Stamm	Switzerland	2:19.35	
25	1	1	Alena Benešová	Czech Republic	2:21.08	

=== Semifinals ===
The semifinals were held at 17:13.

==== Semifinal 1 ====
Rank	Lane	Name	Nationality	Time	Notes
1	5	Katinka Hosszú	Hungary	2:08.83	Q
2	3	Franziska Hentke	Germany	2:09.03	Q
3	4	Zsuzsanna Jakabos	Hungary	2:09.19	Q
4	2	Alessia Polieri	Italy	2:10.31	Q
5	8	Yana Martynova	Russia	2:10.70	
6	1	Marie Wattel	France	2:12.35	
7	6	Barbora Závadová	Czech Republic	2:13.10	
8	7	Keren Siebner	Israel	2:14.74	

==== Semifinal 2 ====
Rank	Lane	Name	Nationality	Time	Notes
1	4	Mireia Belmonte	Spain	2:06.53	Q
2	3	Judit Ignacio Sorribes	Spain	2:07.44	Q
3	5	Martina van Berkel	Switzerland	2:08.45	Q
4	1	Stefania Pirozzi	Italy	2:08.96	Q
5	7	Jemma Lowe	Great Britain	2:10.49	
6	6	Anja Klinar	Slovenia	2:10.76	
7	2	Lara Grangeon	France	2:12.86	
8	8	Danielle Villars	Switzerland	2:13.44	

=== Final ===
The final was held at 16:20.

Rank	Lane	Name	Nationality	Time	Notes
1st place, gold medalist(s)	4	Mireia Belmonte	Spain	2:04.79	CR
2nd place, silver medalist(s)	5	Judit Ignacio Sorribes	Spain	2:06.66	
3rd place, bronze medalist(s)	6	Katinka Hosszú	Hungary	2:07.28	
4	1	Zsuzsanna Jakabos	Hungary	2:08.03	
5	2	Stefania Pirozzi	Italy	2:08.31	
6	7	Franziska Hentke	Germany	2:08.93	
7	3	Martina van Berkel	Switzerland	2:10.28	
8	8	Alessia Polieri	Italy	2:11.58	
