= 2014 FINA World Swimming Championships (25 m) – Women's 200 metre butterfly =

Women's 200 metre butterfly at the 2014 FINA World Swimming Championships (25 m)
- Dates: 3 December
- Competitors: 34 from 26 nations
- Winning time: 1:59.61

Medalists
gold medal	Mireia Belmonte	Spain
silver medal	Katinka Hosszú	Hungary
bronze medal	Franziska Hentke	Germany

The Women's 200 metre butterfly competition of the 2014 FINA World Swimming Championships (25 m) was held on 3 December.

== Records ==
Prior to the competition, the existing world and championship records were as follows.

	Name	Nation	Time	Location	Date
World record	Liu Zige	China	2:00.78	Berlin	15 November 2009
Championship record	Katinka Hosszú	Hungary	2:02.20	Istanbul	12 December 2012

The following records were established during the competition:

Date	Event	Name	Nation	Time	Record
3 December	Final	Mireia Belmonte	Spain	1:59.61	WR

== Results ==
=== Heats ===
The heats were held at 10:44.

Rank	Heat	Lane	Name	Nationality	Time	Notes
1	3	4	Katinka Hosszú	Hungary	2:02.42	Q
2	4	4	Mireia Belmonte	Spain	2:03.61	Q
3	2	6	Zhang Yufei	China	2:04.71	Q
4	2	5	Brianna Throssell	Australia	2:05.03	Q
5	4	3	Franziska Hentke	Germany	2:05.17	Q
6	3	5	Cammile Adams	United States	2:05.35	Q
7	3	6	Miyu Nakano	Japan	2:05.44	Q
8	4	6	Alessia Polieri	Italy	2:05.68	Q
9	4	1	Katherine Mills	United States	2:06.01	
10	2	3	Liu Zige	China	2:06.07	
11	3	2	Stefania Pirozzi	Italy	2:06.42	
12	3	3	Liliána Szilágyi	Hungary	2:06.66	
13	4	2	Katerine Savard	Canada	2:06.68	
14	2	4	Audrey Lacroix	Canada	2:07.41	
15	4	7	Danielle Villars	Switzerland	2:07.91	
16	3	7	Sakiko Shimizu	Japan	2:08.34	
17	2	2	Martina van Berkel	Switzerland	2:08.39	
18	4	8	Anja Klinar	Slovenia	2:08.81	
19	4	5	Sarah Sjöström	Sweden	2:09.51	
20	2	1	Rene Warnes	South Africa	2:09.81	
21	2	7	Marie Wattel	France	2:09.83	
22	3	1	Claudia Hufnagl	Austria	2:11.97	
23	3	0	Jessica Camposano	Colombia	2:12.21	NR
24	3	8	Nida Üstündağ	Turkey	2:12.45	
25	4	9	Julia Hassler	Liechtenstein	2:12.90	
26	1	4	Valerie Gruest	Guatemala	2:13.07	
27	2	8	Chan Kin Lok	Hong Kong	2:15.16	
28	2	0	Hannah Dato	Philippines	2:15.47	
29	3	9	Lara Butler	Cayman Islands	2:17.49	
30	4	0	Sarah Hadj-Abderrahmane	Algeria	2:20.39	
31	2	9	Defne Kurt	Turkey	2:21.50	
32	1	5	San Khant Khant Su	Myanmar	2:31.65	
33	1	3	Diana Basho	Albania	2:33.77	
34	1	6	Dirngulbai Misech	Palau	3:03.34	

=== Final ===
The final was held at 18:28.

Rank	Lane	Name	Nationality	Time	Notes
1st place, gold medalist(s)	5	Mireia Belmonte	Spain	1:59.61	WR
2nd place, silver medalist(s)	4	Katinka Hosszú	Hungary	2:01.12	
3rd place, bronze medalist(s)	2	Franziska Hentke	Germany	2:03.89	
4	3	Zhang Yufei	China	2:04.91	
5	8	Alessia Polieri	Italy	2:05.52	
6	7	Cammile Adams	United States	2:06.35	
7	6	Brianna Throssell	Australia	2:06.40	
8	1	Miyu Nakano	Japan	2:06.45	
