= Swimming at the 2012 European Aquatics Championships – Women's 4 × 100 metre freestyle relay =

Women's 4 × 100 metre freestyle relay at the 2012 European Aquatics Championships
- Dates: May 21, 2012 (heats and final)
- Competitors: 44 from 10 nations
- Winning time: 3:37.98

Medalists
gold medal	Britta Steffen; Silke Lippok; Lisa Vitting; Daniela Schreiber	Germany
silver medal	Ida Marko-Varga; Michelle Coleman; Sarah Sjöström; Gabriella Fagundez	Sweden
bronze medal	Alice Mizzau; Federica Pellegrini; Erica Buratto; Erika Ferraioli	Italy

The women's 4 × 100 metre freestyle relay competition of the swimming events at the 2012 European Aquatics Championships took place May 21. The heats and final took place on May 21.

== Records ==
Prior to the competition, the existing world, European and championship records were as follows.

	Nation	Time	Location	Date
World and European record	Netherlands	3:31.72	Rome	July 26, 2009
Championship record	Netherlands	3:33.62	Eindhoven	March 18, 2008

== Results ==
=== Heats ===
10 nations participated in 2 heats.

Rank	Heat	Lane	Name	Nationality	Time	Notes
1	1	6	Britta Steffen; Silke Lippok; Lisa Vitting; Daniela Schreiber	Germany	3:40.90	Q
2	2	6	Nathalie Lindborg; Michelle Coleman; Louise Hansson; Sarah Sjöström	Sweden	3:41.88	Q
3	2	4	Erica Buratto; Alice Mizzau; Alice Nesti; Erika Ferraioli	Italy	3:42.79	Q
4	1	5	Theodora Drakou; Theodora Giareni; Nery Mantey Niangkouara; Kristel Vourna	Greece	3:43.09	Q, NR
5	1	3	Katinka Hosszú; Ágnes Mutina; Zsuzsanna Jakabos; Evelyn Verrasztó	Hungary	3:43.94	Q
6	1	2	Henriette Brekke; Cecilie Johannessen; Monica Johannessen; Ingvild Snildal	Norway	3:44.09	Q, NR
7	2	5	Sviatlana Khakhlova; Aksana Dziamidava; Yuliya Khitraya; Yana Parakhouskaya	Belarus	3:46.71	Q
8	1	4	Ragnheidur Ragnarsdottir; Eva Hannesdóttir; Eygló Ósk Gústafsdóttir; Sarah Blake Bateman	Iceland	3:48.83	Q, NR
	2	2	Aneta Pechancová; Klára Václavíková; Alžběta Řehořková; Martina Moravčíková	Czech Republic	DSQ	
	2	3	Hanna-Maria Seppälä; Emilia Pikkarainen; Laura Kurki; Linda Laihorinne	Finland	DSQ	

=== Final ===
The final was held at 18:11.

Rank	Lane	Name	Nationality	Time	Notes
1st place, gold medalist(s)	4	Britta Steffen; Silke Lippok; Lisa Vitting; Daniela Schreiber	Germany	3:37.98	
2nd place, silver medalist(s)	5	Ida Marko-Varga; Michelle Coleman; Sarah Sjöström; Gabriella Fagundez	Sweden	3:38.40	
3rd place, bronze medalist(s)	3	Alice Mizzau; Federica Pellegrini; Erica Buratto; Erika Ferraioli	Italy	3:39.84	NR
4	2	Katinka Hosszú; Ágnes Mutina; Zsuzsanna Jakabos; Evelyn Verrasztó	Hungary	3:41.36	
5	6	Theodora Drakou; Theodora Giareni; Nery Mantey Niangkouara; Kristel Vourna	Greece	3:42.09	NR
6	7	Henriette Brekke; Cecilie Johannessen; Monica Johannessen; Ingvild Snildal	Norway	3:45.13	
7	1	Sviatlana Khakhlova; Aksana Dziamidava; Yuliya Khitraya; Yana Parakhouskaya	Belarus	3:45.67	
8	8	Sarah Blake Bateman; Eva Hannesdóttir; Ingibjörg Kristin Jónsdóttir; Ragnheidur Ragnarsdottir	Iceland	3:47.39	NR
