= Swimming at the 2016 European Aquatics Championships – Women's 200 metre butterfly =

Women's 200 metre butterfly at the 2016 European Aquatics Championships
- Dates: 21 May
- Competitors: 27 from 15 nations
- Winning time: 2:07.23

Medalists
gold medal	Franziska Hentke	Germany
silver medal	Liliána Szilágyi	Hungary
bronze medal	Judit Ignacio Sorribes	Spain

The Women's 200 metre butterfly competition of the 2016 European Aquatics Championships was held on 21 May 2016.

== Records ==
Prior to the competition, the existing world, European and championship records were as follows.

	Name	Nation	Time	Location	Date
World record	Liu Zige	China	2:01.81	Jinan	20 October 2009
European record	Katinka Hosszú	Hungary	2:04.27	Rome	29 July 2009
Championship record	Mireia Belmonte	Spain	2:04.79	Berlin	24 August 2014

== Results ==
=== Heats ===
The heats were held on 21 May at 09:23.

Rank	Heat	Lane	Name	Nationality	Time	Notes
1	2	4	Mireia Belmonte	Spain	2:09.70	Q
2	1	4	Liliána Szilágyi	Hungary	2:09.89	Q
3	2	6	Martina van Berkel	Switzerland	2:09.95	Q
4	3	4	Franziska Hentke	Germany	2:10.13	Q
5	3	6	Stefania Pirozzi	Italy	2:10.20	Q
6	3	5	Zsuzsanna Jakabos	Hungary	2:10.21	Q
7	2	3	Judit Ignacio Sorribes	Spain	2:10.29	Q
8	1	8	Nida Üstündağ	Turkey	2:10.34	Q
9	1	5	Alessia Polieri	Italy	2:10.37	Q
10	2	5	Anja Klinar	Slovenia	2:10.83	Q
11	1	3	Aimee Willmott	Great Britain	2:11.32	Q
12	2	2	Ana Monteiro	Portugal	2:11.85	Q
13	3	3	Hannah Miley	Great Britain	2:11.94	Q
14	2	7	Julia Mrozinski	Germany	2:12.03	Q
15	3	1	Keren Siebner	Israel	2:12.96	Q
16	2	1	Barbora Závadová	Czech Republic	2:13.25	Q
17	3	2	Dalma Sebestyén	Hungary	2:13.31	
18	3	7	Ilaria Cusinato	Italy	2:13.41	
19	3	8	Anna Ntountounaki	Greece	2:13.44	
20	1	6	Marie Wattel	France	2:14.06	
21	1	1	Lisa Höpink	Germany	2:14.50	
22	2	8	Victoria Kaminskaya	Portugal	2:15.62	
23	3	0	Claudia Hufnagl	Austria	2:15.64	
24	1	7	Danielle Villars	Switzerland	2:16.69	
25	2	0	Fantine Lesaffre	France	2:19.24	
26	1	0	Tereza Horáková	Czech Republic	2:23.47	
27	3	9	Noel Borshi	Albania	2:23.70	
	1	2	Laura Stephens	Great Britain	DNS	

=== Semifinals ===
The semifinals were held on 21 May at 17:25.

==== Semifinal 1 ====
Rank	Lane	Name	Nationality	Time	Notes
1	4	Liliána Szilágyi	Hungary	2:08.63	Q
2	5	Franziska Hentke	Germany	2:08.74	Q
3	3	Zsuzsanna Jakabos	Hungary	2:08.80	Q
4	2	Anja Klinar	Slovenia	2:09.14	Q
5	6	Nida Üstündağ	Turkey	2:10.23	
6	7	Ana Monteiro	Portugal	2:11.83	
7	8	Barbora Závadová	Czech Republic	2:12.45	
8	1	Julia Mrozinski	Germany	2:13.39	

==== Semifinal 2 ====
Rank	Lane	Name	Nationality	Time	Notes
1	2	Alessia Polieri	Italy	2:07.49	Q
2	6	Judit Ignacio Sorribes	Spain	2:08.76	Q
3	5	Martina van Berkel	Switzerland	2:09.40	Q
4	3	Stefania Pirozzi	Italy	2:10.11	Q
5	7	Aimee Willmott	Great Britain	2:10.22	
6	1	Hannah Miley	Great Britain	2:10.56	
7	4	Mireia Belmonte	Spain	2:10.78	
8	8	Keren Siebner	Israel	2:11.04	

=== Final ===
The final was held on 22 May at 16:25.

Rank	Lane	Name	Nationality	Time	Notes
1st place, gold medalist(s)	3	Franziska Hentke	Germany	2:07.23	
2nd place, silver medalist(s)	5	Liliána Szilágyi	Hungary	2:07.24	
3rd place, bronze medalist(s)	6	Judit Ignacio Sorribes	Spain	2:07.52	
4	2	Zsuzsanna Jakabos	Hungary	2:07.75	
5	4	Alessia Polieri	Italy	2:08.34	
6	7	Anja Klinar	Slovenia	2:09.57	
7	8	Stefania Pirozzi	Italy	2:09.92	
8	1	Martina van Berkel	Switzerland	2:10.36	
