= Swimming at the 2009 Asian Youth Games =

- Venue: Singapore Sports School
- Dates: 2–6 July 2009

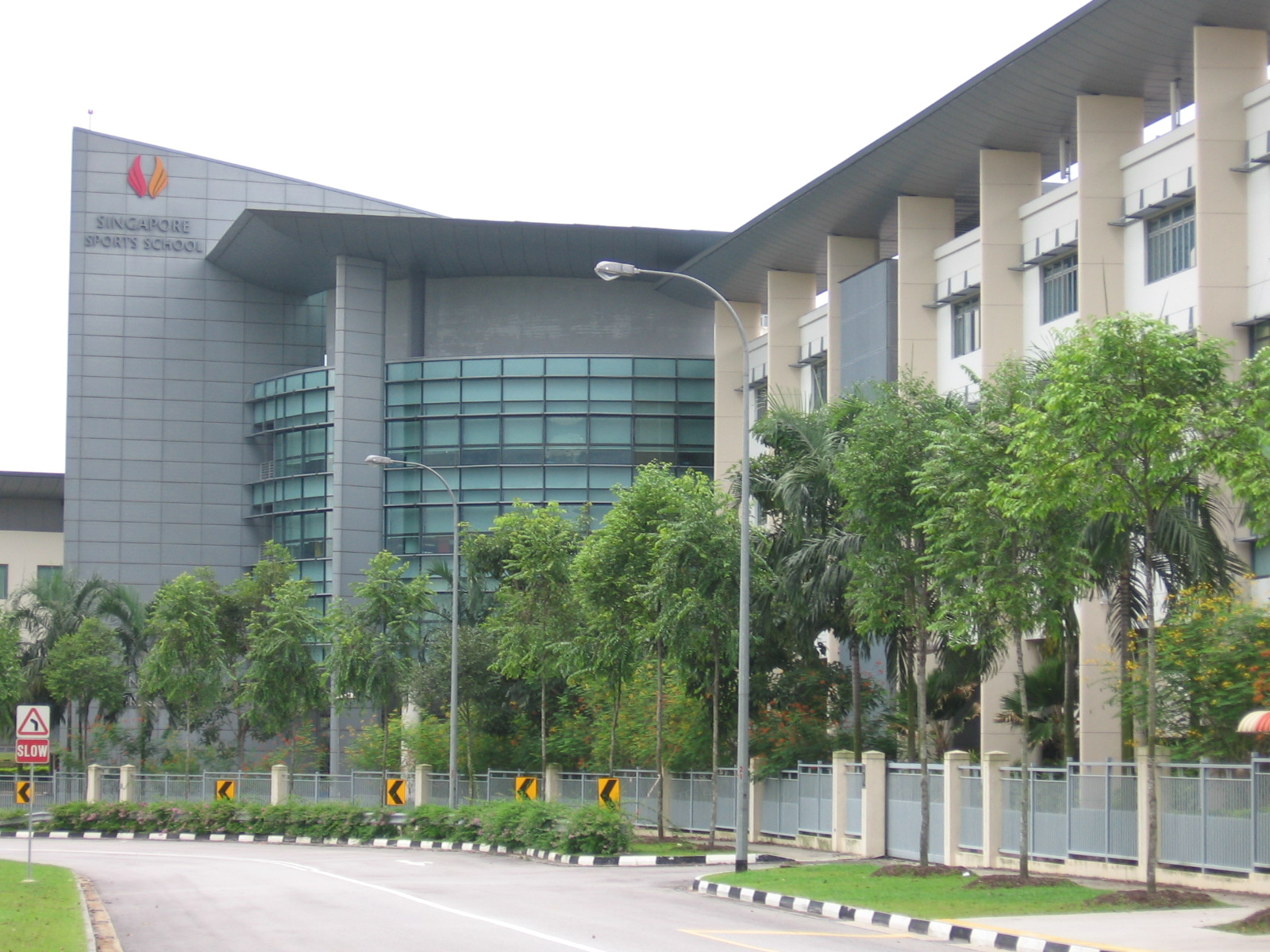
Singapore Sports School

The Swimming competition in the 2009 Asian Youth Games was held in the Singapore Sports School in Singapore between 2 and 6 July 2009. Each country was limited to having 6 boys and 6 girls compete during the entire competition.

== Medalists ==
=== Boys ===
Event	Gold		Silver		Bronze	
50 m freestyle	Lum Ching Tat; Hong Kong	23.13	Sun Yuchen; China	23.59	Liu Chang; China	23.63
100 m freestyle	Lum Ching Tat; Hong Kong	50.48	Abdullah Al-Thuwaini; Kuwait	51.28	Aaron D'Souza; India	51.52
200 m freestyle	Aaron D'Souza; India	1:52.22	Jung Won-yong; South Korea	1:52.80	Kwon Oh-kook; South Korea	1:52.86
400 m freestyle	Kwon Oh-kook; South Korea	3:58.97	Lang Yuanpeng; China	3:59.00	Jafar Bouland; Kuwait	4:01.76
50 m backstroke	Abdullah Al-Thuwaini; Kuwait	26.45	Ruslan Baimanov; Kazakhstan	27.16	Chung Lai Yeung; Hong Kong	27.19
100 m backstroke	Abdullah Al-Thuwaini; Kuwait	56.71	Ruslan Baimanov; Kazakhstan	58.47	Rainer Ng; Singapore	58.67
200 m backstroke	Abdullah Al-Thuwaini; Kuwait	2:04.99	Jung Won-yong; South Korea	2:06.33	Lin Shih-chieh; Chinese Taipei	2:08.09
50 m breaststroke	Sun Yuchen; China	29.16	Wang Ximing; China	29.28	Lionel Khoo; Singapore	29.84
100 m breaststroke	Wang Ximing; China	1:04.45	Shared gold		Gil Byeong-hwi; South Korea	1:04.91
100 m breaststroke	Nuttapong Ketin; Thailand	1:04.45	Shared gold		Gil Byeong-hwi; South Korea	1:04.91
200 m breaststroke	Nuttapong Ketin; Thailand	2:17.25	Gil Byeong-hwi; South Korea	2:18.28	Jung Won-yong; South Korea	2:20.90
50 m butterfly	Chang Gyu-cheol; South Korea	24.78	Salman Qali; Kuwait	25.06	Derick Ng; Hong Kong	25.66
100 m butterfly	Chang Gyu-cheol; South Korea	53.50	Yoo Kyu-sang; South Korea	55.00	Yousef Al-Askari; Kuwait	55.21
200 m butterfly	Chang Gyu-cheol; South Korea	1:59.47	Yoo Kyu-sang; South Korea	2:00.84	Yousef Al-Askari; Kuwait	2:03.26
200 m individual medley	Jung Won-yong; South Korea	2:04.64	Gil Byeong-hwi; South Korea	2:04.75	Nuttapong Ketin; Thailand	2:07.35
4 × 100 m freestyle relay	Hong Kong; Kent Cheung; Chung Lai Yung; Derick Ng; Lum Ching Tat	3:27.28	South Korea; Yoo Kyu-sang; Kwon Oh-kook; Gil Byeong-hwi; Jung Won-yong	3:29.55	China; Huang Zhenghan; Sun Yuchen; Liu Chang; Lang Yuanpeng	3:29.93
4 × 100 m medley relay	South Korea; Jung Won-yong; Gil Byeong-hwi; Chang Gyu-cheol; Kwon Oh-kook	3:50.04	China; Lang Yuanpeng; Sun Yuchen; Liu Chang; Huang Zhenghan	3:51.94	Singapore; Rainer Ng; Lionel Khoo; Mohd Kamal Dzulhali; Clement Lim	3:52.59

=== Girls ===
Event	Gold		Silver		Bronze	
50 m freestyle	Quah Ting Wen; Singapore	25.43	Amanda Lim; Singapore	25.68	Stephanie Au; Hong Kong	26.22
100 m freestyle	Quah Ting Wen; Singapore	55.57	Amanda Lim; Singapore	56.24	Kim Jung-hye; South Korea	56.39
200 m freestyle	Quah Ting Wen; Singapore	1:59.21	Kim Jung-hye; South Korea	1:59.93	Kim Seo-yeong; South Korea	2:01.92
400 m freestyle	Lynette Lim; Singapore	4:14.25	Benjaporn Sriphanomthorn; Thailand	4:21.63	Stephanie Au; Hong Kong	4:21.93
50 m backstroke	Yekaterina Rudenko; Kazakhstan	28.69	Claudia Lau; Hong Kong	30.21	Chen Ting; Chinese Taipei	30.28
100 m backstroke	Yekaterina Rudenko; Kazakhstan	1:02.52	Claudia Lau; Hong Kong	1:03.82	Yulduz Kuchkarova; Uzbekistan	1:04.07
200 m backstroke	Kang Yeong-seo; South Korea	2:14.70	Claudia Lau; Hong Kong	2:18.04	Chen Ting; Chinese Taipei	2:19.27
50 m breaststroke	Wang Chang; China	31.80	Jung Ha-eun; South Korea	32.09	Roanne Ho; Singapore	32.44
100 m breaststroke	Jung Ha-eun; South Korea	1:08.43	Yvette Kong; Hong Kong	1:10.78	Wang Chang; China	1:12.37
200 m breaststroke	Yuliya Litvina; Kazakhstan	2:35.13	Yvette Kong; Hong Kong	2:35.24	Wang Chang; China	2:36.38
50 m butterfly	Liu Lan; China	27.33	Elmira Aigaliyeva; Kazakhstan	27.95	Chan Kin Lok; Hong Kong	28.48
100 m butterfly	Kim Seo-yeong; South Korea	59.99	Yoo Gi-yeon; South Korea	1:00.45	Liu Lan; China	1:00.76
200 m butterfly	Liu Lan; China	2:14.13	Arhatha Magavi; India	2:18.86	Zhang Qi; China	2:18.95
200 m individual medley	Kim Seo-yeong; South Korea	2:15.17	Chen Xiaojun; China	2:18.29	Hsieh Chih-lin; Chinese Taipei	2:21.65
4 × 100 m freestyle relay	Singapore; Koh Hui Yu; Quah Ting Wen; Amanda Lim; Lynette Lim	3:46.91	South Korea; Jung Ha-eun; Yoo Gi-yeon; Kim Seo-yeong; Kim Jung-hye	3:50.56	China; Chen Xiaojun; Wang Chenxin; Wang Chang; Liu Lan	3:51.34
4 × 100 m medley relay	South Korea; Kang Yeong-seo; Jung Ha-eun; Yoo Gi-yeon; Kim Jung-hye	4:09.87	Hong Kong; Claudia Lau; Yvette Kong; Jennifer Town; Stephanie Au	4:12.92	Singapore; Quah Ting Wen; Roanne Ho; Lynette Lim; Amanda Lim	4:13.34

== Medal table ==
Rank	Nation	Gold	Silver	Bronze	Total
1	South Korea (KOR)	11	11	5	27
2	China (CHN)	5	5	7	17
3	Singapore (SIN)	5	2	5	12
4	Hong Kong (HKG)	3	6	5	14
5	Kazakhstan (KAZ)	3	3	0	6
6	Kuwait (KUW)	3	2	3	8
7	Thailand (THA)	2	1	1	4
8	India (IND)	1	1	1	3
9	Chinese Taipei (TPE)	0	0	4	4
10	Uzbekistan (UZB)	0	0	1	1
Totals (10 entries)		33	31	32	96

== Results ==
=== Boys ===
==== 50 m freestyle ====
4–5 July

Rank	Athlete	Heats	SF	Final
1st place, gold medalist(s)	Lum Ching Tat (HKG)	23.57	23.03	23.13
2nd place, silver medalist(s)	Sun Yuchen (CHN)	24.85	23.72	23.59
3rd place, bronze medalist(s)	Liu Chang (CHN)	24.67	23.94	23.63
4	Chung Lai Yueng (HKG)	24.08	24.11	24.07
5	Ahmad Reza Jalali (IRI)	24.46	24.27	24.46
6	Nather Al-Hamoud (KSA)	24.83	24.55	24.57
7	Pouya Jadidi (IRI)	24.75	24.68	24.93
—	Clement Lim (SIN)	24.39	24.17	DSQ
9	Ho Wei Ming (SIN)	25.40	24.76	
10	Hazem Tashkandi (KSA)	25.30	25.05	
11	Heshan Unamboowe (SRI)	25.11	25.09	
12	Oleg Yun (UZB)	25.04	25.11	
13	Andrey Zubakov (KAZ)	25.42	25.14	
14	Cheong Wui Chon (MAC)	25.14	25.15	
15	Mohammad Mahfizur Rahman (BAN)	25.31	25.45	
16	Pulkit Kumar (IND)	25.39	25.51	
17	Mohammed Al-Mahmoud (QAT)	26.12		
18	Georges Abi Kanaan (LIB)	26.53		
19	Samer Yaghmour (LIB)	27.26		
20	Haidar Adel (IRQ)	27.48		
21	Zin Maung Htet (MYA)	28.31		
22	Saamee Ali Yoosuf (MDV)	27.48		
—	Jehad Saleh (PLE)	DSQ		
—	Mukhammad Khakimov (TJK)	DSQ		

==== 100 m freestyle ====
5–6 July

Rank	Athlete	Heats	SF	Final
1st place, gold medalist(s)	Lum Ching Tat (HKG)	52.39	52.86	50.48
2nd place, silver medalist(s)	Abdullah Al-Thuwaini (KUW)	53.95	52.31	51.28
3rd place, bronze medalist(s)	Aaron D'Souza (IND)	52.07	52.44	51.52
4	Huang Zhenghan (CHN)	53.64	53.33	52.46
5	Clement Lim (SIN)	53.47	52.84	52.47
6	Kent Cheung (HKG)	53.02	52.51	52.83
7	Jessie Lacuna (PHI)	53.47	53.32	53.07
8	Sarit Tiewong (THA)	53.77	53.79	53.64
9	Lin Kuan-ting (TPE)	54.21	53.86	
10	Liu Chang (CHN)	53.90	54.10	
11	Ho Wei Ming (SIN)	55.16	54.29	
12	Oleg Yun (UZB)	54.50	54.51	
13	Sun Yu-kai (TPE)	55.64	55.16	
14	Pouya Jadidi (IRI)	54.84	55.18	
15	Lê Quốc Dũng (VIE)	55.63	55.91	
16	Hazem Tashkandi (KSA)	55.56	55.98	
17	Salman Qali (KUW)	55.42		
18	Andrey Zubakov (KAZ)	55.77		
19	Mohammad Mahfizur Rahman (BAN)	55.84		
20	Aleksandr Slepchenko (KGZ)	56.70		
21	Cheong Wui Chon (MAC)	56.86		
22	Abdulrahman Issa (QAT)	27.48		
23	Samer Yaghmour (LIB)	58.31		
24	Moussa Al-Moussa (KSA)	58.83		
25	Georges Abi Kanaan (LIB)	59.02		
26	Haidar Adel (IRQ)	59.40		
27	Ghulam Muhammad (PAK)	1:01.50		
28	Saamee Ali Yoosuf (MDV)	1:12.04		
—	Heshan Unamboowe (SRI)	DNS		

==== 200 m freestyle ====
3 July

Rank	Athlete	Heats	Final
1st place, gold medalist(s)	Aaron D'Souza (IND)	1:55.05	1:52.22
2nd place, silver medalist(s)	Jung Won-yong (KOR)	1:55.16	1:52.80
3rd place, bronze medalist(s)	Kwon Oh-kook (KOR)	1:55.38	1:52.86
4	Yousef Al-Askari (KUW)	1:54.95	1:53.83
5	Lang Yuanpeng (CHN)	1:54.83	1:54.60
6	Huang Zhenghan (CHN)	1:55.70	1:55.26
7	Kent Cheung (HKG)	1:54.66	1:55.31
—	Lum Ching Tat (HKG)	1:56.24	DNS
9	Clement Lim (SIN)	1:55.61	
10	Yeo Jia Chen (SIN)	1:55.83	
11	Sarit Tiewong (THA)	1:56.46	
12	Lin Kuan-ting (TPE)	1:56.51	
13	Jessie Lacuna (PHI)	1:56.52	
14	Abdullah Al-Thuwaini (KUW)	1:57.01	
14	Sun Yu-kai (TPE)	1:57.01	
16	Yrvgeniy Azaryev (KAZ)	2:00.93	
17	Oleg Yun (UZB)	2:01.34	
18	Alexsandr Slepchenko (KGZ)	2:01.59	
19	Vitalii Khudiakov (KGZ)	2:03.60	
20	Mohammad Mahfizur Rahman (BAN)	2:03.65	
21	Siahann Pratama (INA)	2:05.06	
22	Samer Yaghmour (LIB)	2:07.22	
—	Trịnh Trung Thứ (VIE)	DSQ	
—	Abdulrahman Issa (QAT)	DSQ	
—	Dhanika Weerasekara (SRI)	DSQ	
—	Ali Adel (IRQ)	DSQ	

==== 400 m freestyle ====
2 July

Rank	Athlete	Heats	Final
1st place, gold medalist(s)	Kwon Oh-kook (KOR)	4:02.54	3:58.97
2nd place, silver medalist(s)	Lang Yuanpeng (CHN)	4:06.48	3:59.00
3rd place, bronze medalist(s)	Jafar Bouland (KUW)	4:06.40	4:01.76
4	A. P. Gagan (IND)	4:08.11	4:05.95
5	Lin Kuan-ting (TPE)	4:10.29	4:06.58
6	Clement Lim (SIN)	4:08.21	4:06.68
7	Kent Cheung (HKG)	4:10.37	4:07.10
8	Punyawee Sontana (THA)	4:08.53	4:09.45
9	Sun Yu-kai (TPE)	4:11.47	
10	Sarit Tiewong (THA)	4:13.35	
11	Ho Wei Ming (SIN)	4:15.55	
12	Yevgeniy Azaryev (KAZ)	4:15.89	
13	Siahaan Pratama (INA)	4:18.29	
14	Aleksandr Slepchenko (KGZ)	4:23.93	
15	Ali Adel (IRQ)	4:27.94	
16	Samer Yaghmour (LIB)	4:32.23	
17	Abdulaziz Al-Marzooqi (QAT)	4:35.52	

==== 50 m backstroke ====
5–6 July

Rank	Athlete	Heats	Final
1st place, gold medalist(s)	Abdullah Al-Thuwaini (KUW)	26.70	26.45
2nd place, silver medalist(s)	Ruslan Baimanov (KAZ)	27.46	27.16
3rd place, bronze medalist(s)	Chung Lai Yeung (HKG)	28.03	27.19
4	Rainer Ng (SIN)	27.92	27.24
5	Pun Sriboonyapirat (THA)	27.91	27.62
6	I Gede Siman Sudartawa (INA)	28.17	27.84
7	Mohd Kamal Dzulhali (SIN)	28.35	28.33
8	Tsung Chao-lin (TPE)	28.42	28.45
9	Lin Shih-chieh (TPE)	28.81	
10	Daniil Bukin (UZB)	29.19	
11	Pouria Maldar Ghasri (IRI)	30.11	
12	Mohammed Al-Mahmoud (QAT)	30.59	
13	Ali Zayeri (BRN)	30.88	
14	Saamee Ali Yoosuf (MDV)	38.98	
—	Heshan Unamboowe (SRI)	DSQ	
—	Moussa Al-Moussa (KSA)	DNS	

==== 100 m backstroke ====
2–3 July

Rank	Athlete	Heats	SF	Final
1st place, gold medalist(s)	Abdullah Al-Thuwaini (KUW)	59.93	57.72	56.71
2nd place, silver medalist(s)	Ruslan Baimanov (KAZ)	59.80	58.57	58.47
3rd place, bronze medalist(s)	Rainer Ng (SIN)	1:00.39	59.37	58.67
4	Jung Won-yong (KOR)	59.91	59.89	59.05
5	Tsung Chao-lin (TPE)	1:00.23	1:00.69	59.46
6	Heshan Unamboowe (SRI)	1:00.74	1:00.01	1:00.21
7	Yeo Jia Chen (SIN)	1:00.57	1:00.16	1:00.79
8	Chung Lai Yeung (HKG)	1:00.85	1:00.57	1:04.19
9	Pun Sriboonyapirat (THA)	1:00.13	1:00.79	
10	I Gede Siman Sudartawa (INA)	1:01.24	1:01.05	
11	Lin Shih-chieh (TPE)	1:00.78	1:01.10	
12	Jose Joaquin Gonzalez (PHI)	1:01.62	1:01.75	
13	Pouria Maldar Ghasri (IRI)	1:02.32	1:02.24	
14	Dmitriy Shvetsov (UZB)	1:02.66	1:02.30	
15	Amro Lakmoush (SYR)	1:03.49	1:03.43	
16	Abdulrahman Issa (QAT)	1:04.83	1:04.57	
17	Ali Zayeri (BRN)	1:09.90		
18	Moussa Al-Moussa (KSA)	1:10.20		

==== 200 m backstroke ====
4 July

Rank	Athlete	Heats	Final
1st place, gold medalist(s)	Abdullah Al-Thuwaini (KUW)	2:10.12	2:04.99
2nd place, silver medalist(s)	Jung Won-yong (KOR)	2:09.32	2:06.33
3rd place, bronze medalist(s)	Lin Shih-chieh (TPE)	2:09.63	2:08.09
4	Ruslan Baimanov (KAZ)	2:13.04	2:08.40
5	Rainer Ng (SIN)	2:11.09	2:08.94
6	Yeo Jia Chen (SIN)	2:12.36	2:11.86
7	Johansen Aguilar (PHI)	2:13.71	2:12.53
8	Daniil Bukin (UZB)	2:12.80	2:14.85
9	Tsung Chao-lin (TPE)	2:13.95	
10	Amro Lakmoush (SYR)	2:15.60	
11	Pouria Maldar Ghasri (IRI)	2:17.87	
12	Pun Sriboonyapirat (THA)	2:18.17	
13	I Gede Siman Sudartawa (INA)	2:18.64	
14	Kent Cheung (HKG)	2:22.36	
15	Hussain Abdulhamid (QAT)	2:30.32	

==== 50 m breaststroke ====
2–3 July

Rank	Athlete	Heats	SF	Final
1st place, gold medalist(s)	Sun Yuchen (CHN)	29.80	29.18	29.16
2nd place, silver medalist(s)	Wang Ximing (CHN)	30.37	29.59	29.28
3rd place, bronze medalist(s)	Lionel Khoo (SIN)	30.04	30.12	29.84
4	Ronald Tsui (HKG)	31.35	30.85	30.67
5	Joel Chong (SIN)	31.37	31.18	30.91
6	Nuttapong Ketin (THA)	30.82	31.03	31.07
7	Alexandr Lazarev (KAZ)	31.62	31.26	31.18
8	Dmitri Aleksandrov (KGZ)	31.24	31.44	31.32
9	Jashandeep Singh (IND)	31.61	31.58	
10	Sepehr Afjehei (IRI)	31.83	31.76	
11	Georgiy Lyshchik (UZB)	32.41	31.83	
12	Chou Kit (MAC)	32.35	31.91	
13	Ahmad Al-Bader (KUW)	32.48	32.32	
14	Murtadha Hussain Al-Bin (KSA)	33.23	33.36	
15	Ahmed Atari (QAT)	33.55	33.59	
16	Georges Abi Kanaan (LIB)	35.32	35.74	
17	Banin Sensha Shrestha (NEP)	36.51		

==== 100 m breaststroke ====
3–4 July

Rank	Athlete	Heats	SF	Final
1st place, gold medalist(s)	Wang Ximing (CHN)	1:05.08	1:06.88	1:04.45
1st place, gold medalist(s)	Nuttapong Ketin (THA)	1:06.27	1:05.35	1:04.45
3rd place, bronze medalist(s)	Gil Byeong-hwi (KOR)	1:06.64	1:04.89	1:04.91
4	Lionel Khoo (SIN)	1:06.38	1:06.08	1:05.09
5	Dmitri Aleksandrov (KGZ)	1:07.11	1:06.82	1:06.78
6	Supakorn Chewathaworn (THA)	1:08.12	1:07.65	1:07.11
7	Banjo Borja (PHI)	1:08.27	1:07.59	1:07.68
8	Alexandr Lazarev (KAZ)	1:08.01	1:07.51	1:07.72
9	Ronald Tsui (HKG)	1:08.12	1:07.77	
10	Joel Chong (SIN)	1:08.60	1:08.12	
11	Heri Dewanto (INA)	1:09.78	1:09.99	
12	Ahmad Al-Bader (KUW)	1:10.83	1:10.22	
13	Sepehr Afjehei (IRI)	1:10.46	1:10.25	
14	Georgiy Lyshchik (UZB)	1:09.05	1:10.40	
15	Aditya Roshan (IND)	1:09.97	1:10.52	
16	Chou Kit (MAC)	1:09.97	1:10.75	
17	Murtadha Hussain Al-Bin (KSA)	1:13.41		
18	Ahmed Atari (QAT)	1:14.38		
19	Georges Abi Kanaan (LIB)	1:20.18		
—	Banin Sensha Shrestha (NEP)	DNS		

==== 200 m breaststroke ====
6 July

Rank	Athlete	Heats	Final
1st place, gold medalist(s)	Nuttapong Ketin (THA)	2:27.91	2:17.25
2nd place, silver medalist(s)	Gil Byeong-hwi (KOR)	2:26.96	2:18.28
3rd place, bronze medalist(s)	Jung Won-yong (KOR)	2:27.58	2:20.90
4	Dmitri Aleksandrov (KGZ)	2:26.40	2:22.44
5	Dimitriy Shvetsov (UZB)	2:26.93	2:23.61
6	Lionel Khoo (SIN)	2:28.95	2:26.26
7	Ronald Tsui (HKG)	2:28.38	2:27.27
8	Alexandr Lazarev (KAZ)	2:30.11	2:28.27
9	Ahmad Al-Bader (KUW)	2:30.64	
10	Georgiy Lyshchik (UZB)	2:32.20	
11	Akash Rohit (IND)	2:34.60	
12	Banjo Borja (PHI)	2:36.29	
13	Heri Dewanto (INA)	2:38.30	
14	Murtadha Hussain Al-Bin (KSA)	2:44.06	
—	Pang Sheng Jun (SIN)	DSQ	
—	Georges Abi Kanaan (LIB)	DNS	

==== 50 m butterfly ====
3–4 July

Rank	Athlete	Heats	Final
1st place, gold medalist(s)	Chang Gyu-cheol (KOR)	25.53	24.78
2nd place, silver medalist(s)	Salman Qali (KUW)	25.32	25.06
3rd place, bronze medalist(s)	Derick Ng (HKG)	26.26	25.66
4	Mohd Kamal Dzulhali (SIN)	25.78	25.83
5	Arvin Moradi (IRI)	26.14	26.24
6	Chong Cheok Kuan (MAC)	26.48	26.28
7	Nather Al-Hamound (KSA)	26.29	26.55
8	Dmitriy Shvetsov (UZB)	26.12	26.60
9	Jonathan Poh (SIN)	26.50	
10	Aleksei Klimenko (KGZ)	27.00	
11	Andre Cipta Nugraha (INA)	27.11	
12	Anik Islam (BAN)	27.32	
13	Mohammed Al-Mahmoud (QAT)	28.71	
14	Saamee Ali Yoosuf (MDV)	35.26	

==== 100 m butterfly ====
4–5 July

Rank	Athlete	Heats	SF	Final
1st place, gold medalist(s)	Chang Gyu-cheol (KOR)	56.41	55.46	53.50
2nd place, silver medalist(s)	Yoo Kyu-sang (KOR)	57.36	55.07	55.00
3rd place, bronze medalist(s)	Yousef Al-Askari (KUW)	56.50	56.25	55.21
4	Salman Qali (KUW)	58.42	56.39	55.38
5	Derick Ng (HKG)	57.05	56.20	55.79
6	Aaron D'Souza (IND)	57.36	56.27	56.65
7	Arkom Anuchitolarn (THA)	57.68	57.37	57.58
8	Jonathan Poh (SIN)	58.03	57.24	57.80
9	Mohd Kamal Dzulhali (SIN)	57.77	57.54	
10	Ilya Belykh (KAZ)	57.66	57.68	
11	Jessie Lacuna (PHI)	58.15	57.89	
12	Dmitriy Shvetsov (UZB)	58.34	58.30	
13	I Gede Siman Sudartawa (INA)	59.37	58.35	
14	Liu Chang (CHN)	59.12	59.23	
15	Chong Cheok Kuan (MAC)	58.89	59.36	
16	Nather Al-Hamound (KSA)	59.43	1:04.90	
17	Andre Cipta Nugraha (INA)	59.64		
18	Arvin Moradi (IRI)	59.68		
19	Aleksei Klimenko (KGZ)	1:00.48		
20	Anik Islam (BAN)	1:01.10		
21	Abdulrahman Al-Ollan (QAT)	1:03.87		

==== 200 m butterfly ====
2 July

Rank	Athlete	Heats	Final
1st place, gold medalist(s)	Chang Gyu-cheol (KOR)	2:04.72	1:59.47
2nd place, silver medalist(s)	Yoo Kyu-sang (KOR)	2:05.25	2:00.84
3rd place, bronze medalist(s)	Yousef Al-Askari (KUW)	2:04.49	2:03.26
4	Aaron D'Souza (IND)	2:04.95	2:03.65
5	Arkom Anuchitolarn (THA)	2:08.87	2:06.39
6	Lang Yuanpeng (CHN)	2:10.24	2:07.36
7	Ling Yin Yu (HKG)	2:08.93	2:09.79
8	Joseph Schooling (SIN)	2:08.95	2:10.79
9	Siahaan Pratama (INA)	2:10.26	
10	Daniel Tay (SIN)	2:11.49	
11	Vitalii Khudiakov (KGZ)	2:14.43	
12	Igor Vagizov (KAZ)	2:14.64	
13	Abdulrahman Al-Ollan (QAT)	2:18.82	

==== 200 m individual medley ====
5 July

Rank	Athlete	Heats	Final
1st place, gold medalist(s)	Jung Won-yong (KOR)	2:09.92	2:04.64
2nd place, silver medalist(s)	Gil Byeong-hwi (KOR)	2:12.23	2:04.75
3rd place, bronze medalist(s)	Nuttapong Ketin (THA)	2:11.48	2:07.35
4	Yousef Al-Askari (KUW)	2:09.76	2:07.85
5	Dmitriy Shvetsov (UZB)	2:12.12	2:09.37
6	Pang Sheng Jun (SIN)	2:11.74	2:09.45
7	Lang Yuanpeng (CHN)	2:11.51	2:11.21
8	Banjo Borja (PHI)	2:12.78	2:11.60
9	Ahmad Reza Jalali (IRI)	2:15.68	
10	Joseph Schooling (SIN)	2:16.21	
11	Ilya Belykh (KAZ)	2:16.65	
12	Andrew Budiman (INA)	2:17.24	
13	Huang Zhenghan (CHN)	2:17.58	
14	Vitalii Khudiakov (KGZ)	2:21.19	
15	Hazem Tashkandi (KSA)	2:22.71	
16	Abdulrahman Al-Ollan (QAT)	2:22.74	
17	Samer Yaghmour (LIB)	2:30.12	
18	Narantsogiin Tsogjargal (MGL)	2:33.79	
19	Lum Ching Tat (HKG)	2:39.97	

==== 4 × 100 m freestyle relay ====
3 July

Rank	Team	Heats	Final
1st place, gold medalist(s)	Hong Kong (HKG)	3:33.42	3:27.28
2nd place, silver medalist(s)	South Korea (KOR)	3:34.17	3:29.55
3rd place, bronze medalist(s)	China (CHN)	3:33.80	3:29.93
4	Singapore (SIN)	3:34.86	3:30.08
5	Kuwait (KUW)	3:37.67	3:30.65
6	Thailand (THA)	3:39.10	3:37.91
7	Iran (IRI)	3:40.31	3:38.32
8	Uzbekistan (UZB)	3:38.73	3:40.00
9	Chinese Taipei (TPE)	3:40.79	
10	Kazakhstan (KAZ)	3:40.93	
11	Kyrgyzstan (KGZ)	3:50.63	
12	Macau (MAC)	3:51.66	
13	Saudi Arabia (KSA)	3:51.77	
14	Qatar (QAT)	3:54.73	
15	India (IND)	3:58.08	
—	Philippines (PHI)	DNS	

==== 4 × 100 m medley relay ====
5 July

Rank	Team	Heats	Final
1st place, gold medalist(s)	South Korea (KOR)	3:58.76	3:50.04
2nd place, silver medalist(s)	China (CHN)	3:57.80	3:51.94
3rd place, bronze medalist(s)	Singapore (SIN)	4:00.56	3:52.59
4	Hong Kong (HKG)	4:00.73	3:56.28
5	Kuwait (KUW)	4:02.13	3:56.62
6	Kazakhstan (KAZ)	3:58.78	3:56.78
7	Thailand (THA)	4:03.56	4:02.67
8	Uzbekistan (UZB)	4:07.16	4:03.50
9	Chinese Taipei (TPE)	4:08.09	
10	Kyrgyzstan (KGZ)	4:08.19	
11	Indonesia (INA)	4:10.35	
12	Iran (IRI)	4:10.66	
13	Macau (MAC)	4:12.12	
14	India (IND)	4:25.30	
15	Qatar (QAT)	4:32.37	
—	Saudi Arabia (KSA)	DSQ	
—	Philippines (PHI)	DNS	

=== Girls ===
==== 50 m freestyle ====
4–5 July

Rank	Athlete	Heats	SF	Final
1st place, gold medalist(s)	Quah Ting Wen (SIN)	26.33	25.54	25.43
2nd place, silver medalist(s)	Amanda Lim (SIN)	26.64	25.38	25.68
3rd place, bronze medalist(s)	Stephanie Au (HKG)	27.09	26.21	26.22
4	Yekaterina Gakhokidze (KAZ)	26.84	26.35	26.32
5	Chen Chiao-ying (TPE)	27.47	27.18	27.08
6	Jasmine Al-Khaldi (PHI)	27.73	27.56	27.21
7	Chen Xiaojun (CHN)	27.27	27.19	27.34
8	Yvette Kong (HKG)	26.95	26.95	26.54
9	Benjaporn Sriphanomthorn (THA)	27.65	27.61	
10	Jenjira Srisa-ard (THA)	27.85	27.63	
11	Sneha Thirugnanasambandam (IND)	27.90	27.78	
12	Trần Tâm Nguyện (VIE)	27.93	27.98	
13	Wang Chang (CHN)	27.13	28.15	
14	Chan Weng Si (MAC)	28.58	28.50	
15	Amanda Liew (BRU)	29.52	29.15	
16	Hem Thon Vitiny (CAM)	31.55	31.60	
17	Karishma Karki (NEP)	33.66		
18	Aminath Shajan (MDV)	34.30		
—	Gantömöriin Oyuungerel (MGL)	DSQ		
—	Bayan Jumah (SYR)	DNS		

==== 100 m freestyle ====
5–6 July

Rank	Athlete	Heats	SF	Final
1st place, gold medalist(s)	Quah Ting Wen (SIN)	58.62	58.28	55.57
2nd place, silver medalist(s)	Amanda Lim (SIN)	58.81	58.21	56.24
3rd place, bronze medalist(s)	Kim Jung-hye (KOR)	58.82	57.51	56.39
4	Yekaterina Gakhokidze (KAZ)	57.87	58.32	57.61
5	Benjaporn Sriphanomthorn (THA)	1:00.83	59.06	58.49
6	Stephanie Au (HKG)	59.73	58.46	58.60
7	Chen Xiaojun (CHN)	1:00.46	58.85	58.76
8	Jasmine Al-Khaldi (PHI)	59.87	59.53	59.04
9	Wang Chang (CHN)	59.25	59.69	
10	Yulduz Kuchkarova (UZB)	1:01.36	59.84	
11	Talasha Prabhu (IND)	1:00.34	59.99	
12	Bayan Jumah (SYR)	1:00.65	1:00.40	
13	Gaziza Kumakbayeva (KAZ)	1:00.62	1:00.75	
14	Trần Tâm Nguyện (VIE)	1:00.22	1:00.85	
15	Tao Yu-an (TPE)	1:01.59	1:02.06	
16	Chen Chiao-ying (TPE)	1:01.74	1:05.87	
17	Ressa Kania Dewi (INA)	1:01.90		
18	Fibriani Ratna Marita (INA)	1:03.79		
19	Amanda Liew (BRU)	1:04.74		
20	Aminath Shajan (MDV)	1:15.71		
—	Karishma Karki (NEP)	DNS		
—	Kim Seo-yeong (KOR)	DNS		

==== 200 m freestyle ====
3 July

Rank	Athlete	Heats	Final
1st place, gold medalist(s)	Quah Ting Wen (SIN)	2:01.99	1:59.21
2nd place, silver medalist(s)	Kim Jung-hye (KOR)	2:02.15	1:59.93
3rd place, bronze medalist(s)	Kim Seo-yeong (KOR)	2:06.41	2:01.92
4	Lynette Lim (SIN)	2:04.66	2:03.53
5	Chen Xiaojun (CHN)	2:06.41	2:04.20
6	Stephanie Au (HKG)	2:06.88	2:05.11
7	Jennifer Town (HKG)	2:07.05	2:08.01
—	Benjaporn Sriphanomthorn (THA)	2:09.51	DSQ
9	Jasmine Al-Khaldi (PHI)	2:09.89	
10	Ranohon Amanova (UZB)	2:10.51	
11	Trần Tâm Nguyện (VIE)	2:10.74	
12	Lana Chernyshova (KAZ)	2:11.02	
13	Ressa Kania Dewi (INA)	2:12.23	
14	Ting Sheng-yo (TPE)	2:12.37	
15	Tao Yu-an (TPE)	2:12.38	
16	Talasha Prabhu (IND)	2:12.45	
17	Raina Ramdhani (INA)	2:16.80	
18	Diana Al-Azmel (SYR)	2:17.35	

==== 400 m freestyle ====
2 July

Rank	Athlete	Heats	Final
1st place, gold medalist(s)	Lynette Lim (SIN)	4:18.23	4:14.25
2nd place, silver medalist(s)	Benjaporn Sriphanomthorn (THA)	4:31.01	4:21.63
3rd place, bronze medalist(s)	Stephanie Au (HKG)	4:26.98	4:21.93
4	Koh Hui Yu (SIN)	4:27.22	4:22.56
5	Zhang Qi (CHN)	4:30.50	4:29.23
6	Ranohon Amanova (UZB)	4:33.94	4:29.30
7	Hsieh Chih-lin (TPE)	4:28.63	4:32.51
8	Ressa Kania Dewi (INA)	4:34.90	4:37.41
9	Lana Chernyshova (KAZ)	4:37.87	
10	Raina Ramdhani (INA)	4:37.89	
11	Maftunabonu Tukhtasinova (UZB)	4:38.45	
12	Diana Al-Azmel (SYR)	4:50.95	
13	Pratima Kollali (IND)	4:53.34	

==== 50 m backstroke ====
5–6 July

Rank	Athlete	Heats	Final
1st place, gold medalist(s)	Yekaterina Rudenko (KAZ)	29.44	28.69
2nd place, silver medalist(s)	Claudia Lau (HKG)	30.77	30.21
3rd place, bronze medalist(s)	Chen Ting (TPE)	30.93	30.28
4	Yulduz Kuchkarova (UZB)	30.94	30.36
5	Dorothy Hong (PHI)	31.34	31.27
6	Adeline Winata (SIN)	31.65	31.31
7	Parichat Srinorakutr (THA)	31.89	32.25
8	Deborah Chua (SIN)	31.93	32.28
9	Nguyễn Thị Kim Tuyến (VIE)	32.07	
10	Chen Chiao-ying (TPE)	32.36	
11	Chan Weng Si (MAC)	32.87	
12	Fibriani Ratna Marita (INA)	32.91	

==== 100 m backstroke ====
2–3 July

Rank	Athlete	Heats	Final
1st place, gold medalist(s)	Yekaterina Rudenko (KAZ)	1:06.55	1:02.52
2nd place, silver medalist(s)	Claudia Lau (HKG)	1:05.93	1:03.82
3rd place, bronze medalist(s)	Yulduz Kuchkarova (UZB)	1:07.34	1:04.07
4	Kang Yeong-seo (KOR)	1:05.99	1:04.10
5	Chen Ting (TPE)	1:05.20	1:04.43
6	Wang Chenxin (CHN)	1:06.41	1:06.29
7	Zhao Lu (CHN)	1:07.30	1:07.00
8	Dorothy Hong (PHI)	1:07.37	1:07.31
9	Adeline Winata (SIN)	1:07.86	
10	Parichat Srinorakutr (THA)	1:08.76	
11	Yessy Yosaputra (INA)	1:08.94	
12	Deborah Chua (SIN)	1:09.71	
12	Che Lok In (MAC)	1:09.71	
14	Fibriani Ratna Marita (INA)	1:10.60	

==== 200 m backstroke ====
4 July

Rank	Athlete	Heats	Final
1st place, gold medalist(s)	Kang Yeong-seo (KOR)	2:18.34	2:14.70
2nd place, silver medalist(s)	Claudia Lau (HKG)	2:21.33	2:18.04
3rd place, bronze medalist(s)	Chen Ting (TPE)	2:22.68	2:19.27
4	Wang Chenxin (CHN)	2:21.86	2:21.11
5	Yulduz Kuchkarova (UZB)	2:24.28	2:21.63
6	Zhao Lu (CHN)	2:24.62	2:23.09
7	Yessy Yosaputra (INA)	2:25.80	2:26.68
8	Adeline Winata (SIN)	2:26.93	2:29.35
9	Yekaterina Rudenko (KAZ)	2:24.45	
10	Dorothy Hong (PHI)	2:28.61	
11	Parichat Srinorakutr (THA)	2:28.95	
12	Deborah Chua (SIN)	2:31.41	
13	Fibriani Ratna Marita (INA)	2:35.19	
14	Sakina Ghulam (PAK)	2:46.16	
—	Nguyễn Thị Kim Tuyến (VIE)	DNS	

==== 50 m breaststroke ====
2–3 July

Rank	Athlete	Heats	Final
1st place, gold medalist(s)	Wang Chang (CHN)	33.24	31.80
2nd place, silver medalist(s)	Jung Ha-eun (KOR)	32.69	32.09
3rd place, bronze medalist(s)	Roanne Ho (SIN)	33.17	32.44
4	Yvette Kong (HKG)	33.16	32.84
5	Yuliya Litvina (KAZ)	35.18	33.65
6	Margaretha Kretapadani (INA)	35.49	34.92
7	Charmaine Tan (SIN)	35.16	34.93
8	Hsieh Chai-pao (TPE)	35.29	35.22
9	Amanda Liew (BRU)	37.78	
10	Hem Thon Vitiny (CAM)	40.37	
11	Aminath Shajan (MDV)	49.00	

==== 100 m breaststroke ====
3–4 July

Rank	Athlete	Heats	Final
1st place, gold medalist(s)	Jung Ha-eun (KOR)	1:09.34	1:08.43
2nd place, silver medalist(s)	Yvette Kong (HKG)	1:15.02	1:10.78
3rd place, bronze medalist(s)	Wang Chang (CHN)	1:12.18	1:12.37
4	Roanne Ho (SIN)	1:12.55	1:12.98
5	Yuliya Litvina (KAZ)	1:11.72	1:14.05
6	Fiona Ma (HKG)	1:15.43	1:14.37
7	Margaretha Kretapadani (INA)	1:15.97	1:16.02
8	Chavunnooch Salubluek (THA)	1:16.37	1:18.58
9	Hsieh Chai-pao (TPE)	1:16.73	
10	Charmaine Tan (SIN)	1:17.06	
11	Amanda Liew (BRU)	1:24.78	

==== 200 m breaststroke ====
6 July

Rank	Athlete	Heats	Final
1st place, gold medalist(s)	Yuliya Litvina (KAZ)	2:43.63	2:35.13
2nd place, silver medalist(s)	Yvette Kong (HKG)	2:42.57	2:35.24
3rd place, bronze medalist(s)	Wang Chang (CHN)	2:42.60	2:36.38
4	Fiona Ma (HKG)	2:42.02	2:39.14
5	Hsieh Chai-pao (TPE)	2:43.74	2:40.99
6	Chanvunnooch Salubluek (THA)	2:48.53	2:43.85
7	Cheryl Lim (SIN)	2:46.74	2:45.63
8	Hsieh Chih-lin (TPE)	2:46.92	2:45.73
9	Margaretha Kretapadani (INA)	2:49.04	
10	Charmaine Tan (SIN)	2:51.06	

==== 50 m butterfly ====
3–4 July

Rank	Athlete	Heats	Final
1st place, gold medalist(s)	Liu Lan (CHN)	27.96	27.33
2nd place, silver medalist(s)	Elmira Aigaliyeva (KAZ)	28.35	27.95
3rd place, bronze medalist(s)	Chan Kin Lok (HKG)	29.01	28.48
4	Nguyễn Thị Kim Tuyến (VIE)	29.53	29.50
5	Ressa Kania Dewi (INA)	29.82	29.67
—	Yoo Gi-yeon (KOR)	28.08	DSQ
—	Tiffanhy Koh (SIN)	29.83	DSQ
—	Jenjira Srisa-ard (THA)	29.48	DNS
9	Ting Sheng-yo (TPE)	29.89	
10	Rachel Yeo (SIN)	29.92	
11	Long Chi Wun (MAC)	29.96	
12	Arhatha Magavi (IND)	30.17	
13	Maftunabonu Tukhtasinova (UZB)	31.92	
14	Aminath Shajan (MDV)	42.01	

==== 100 m butterfly ====
4–5 July

Rank	Athlete	Heats	Final
1st place, gold medalist(s)	Kim Seo-yeong (KOR)	1:02.35	59.99
2nd place, silver medalist(s)	Yoo Gi-yeon (KOR)	1:02.93	1:00.45
3rd place, bronze medalist(s)	Liu Lan (CHN)	1:02.40	1:00.76
4	Jennifer Town (HKG)	1:03.74	1:03.20
5	Patarawadee Kittiya (THA)	1:04.82	1:04.40
6	Chan Kin Lok (HKG)	1:04.05	1:04.48
7	Ting Sheng-yo (TPE)	1:05.39	1:04.66
8	Nguyễn Thị Kim Tuyến (VIE)	1:04.41	1:05.53
9	Ressa Kania Dewi (INA)	1:05.54	
10	Elmira Aigaliyeva (KAZ)	1:05.56	
11	Zhang Qi (CHN)	1:05.60	
11	Rachel Yeo (SIN)	1:05.60	
13	Tiffanhy Koh (SIN)	1:06.47	
14	Arhatha Magavi (IND)	1:06.67	
15	Raina Ramdhani (INA)	1:07.28	
16	Maftunabonu Tukhtasinova (UZB)	1:09.90	

==== 200 m butterfly ====
2 July

Rank	Athlete	Heats	Final
1st place, gold medalist(s)	Liu Lan (CHN)	2:16.07	2:14.13
2nd place, silver medalist(s)	Arhatha Magavi (IND)	2:19.78	2:18.86
3rd place, bronze medalist(s)	Zhang Qi (CHN)	2:20.27	2:18.95
4	Jennifer Town (HKG)	2:19.98	2:19.27
5	Patarawadee Kittiya (THA)	2:21.61	2:20.86
6	Raina Ramdhani (INA)	2:22.27	2:21.70
7	Chan Kin Lok (HKG)	2:24.79	2:21.99
—	Elmira Aigaliyeva (KAZ)	2:23.56	DNS
9	Tao Yu-an (TPE)	2:25.11	
10	Verada Udompongpaisal (THA)	2:25.24	
11	Nguyễn Thị Kim Tuyến (VIE)	2:26.38	
12	Tiffanhy Koh (SIN)	2:27.25	
13	Rachel Goh (SIN)	2:29.81	

==== 200 m individual medley ====
5 July

Rank	Athlete	Heats	Final
1st place, gold medalist(s)	Kim Seo-yeong (KOR)	2:20.95	2:15.17
2nd place, silver medalist(s)	Chen Xiaojun (CHN)	2:22.81	2:18.29
3rd place, bronze medalist(s)	Hsieh Chih-lin (TPE)	2:25.93	2:21.65
4	Ranohon Amanova (UZB)	2:24.95	2:22.87
5	Koh Hui Yu (SIN)	2:25.48	2:24.66
6	Fiona Ma (HKG)	2:28.26	2:27.39
7	Hannah Dato (PHI)	2:27.62	2:28.01
8	Yvette Kong (HKG)	2:25.59	2:28.16
9	Zhao Lu (CHN)	2:28.78	
10	Adeline Winata (SIN)	2:29.47	
11	Ressa Kania Dewi (INA)	2:29.62	
12	Benjaporn Sriphanomthorn (THA)	2:31.54	
13	Fibriani Ratna Marita (INA)	2:31.87	
14	Diana Al-Azmel (SYR)	2:35.71	
15	Choi Sin Hong (MAC)	2:40.47	

==== 4 × 100 m freestyle relay ====
6 July

Rank	Team	Heats	Final
1st place, gold medalist(s)	Singapore (SIN)	3:53.99	3:46.91
2nd place, silver medalist(s)	South Korea (KOR)	3:58.38	3:50.56
3rd place, bronze medalist(s)	China (CHN)	4:05.65	3:51.34
4	Hong Kong (HKG)	3:59.15	3:52.35
5	Kazakhstan (KAZ)	3:59.78	3:55.62
6	Chinese Taipei (TPE)	4:04.63	4:00.92
7	Uzbekistan (UZB)	4:05.05	4:01.16
8	India (IND)	4:09.88	4:12.88
9	Thailand (THA)	4:14.08	
10	Macau (MAC)	4:18.09	

==== 4 × 100 m medley relay ====
4 July

Rank	Team	Heats	Final
1st place, gold medalist(s)	South Korea (KOR)	4:17.13	4:09.87
2nd place, silver medalist(s)	Hong Kong (HKG)	4:18.83	4:12.92
3rd place, bronze medalist(s)	Singapore (SIN)	4:19.42	4:13.34
4	Kazakhstan (KAZ)	4:18.27	4:14.26
5	China (CHN)	4:18.06	4:15.38
6	Chinese Taipei (TPE)	4:30.86	4:26.33
7	Thailand (THA)	4:30.06	4:29.24
8	Uzbekistan (UZB)	4:34.77	4:32.09
9	Indonesia (INA)	4:34.83	
10	India (IND)	4:54.86	
11	Macau (MAC)	4:56.75	
