= Swimming at the 2010 Summer Youth Olympics – Girls' 100 metre butterfly =

The women's 100 metre butterfly heats and semifinals at the 2010 Youth Olympic Games took place on August 19 with the final on August 20 at the Singapore Sports School.

== Medalists ==
Gold	Liu Lan; China	59.67
Silver	Judit Ignacio; Spain	1:00.07
Bronze	Rachael Kelly; Great Britain	1:00.26

== Heats ==
=== Heat 1 ===
Rank	Lane	Name	Nationality	Time	Notes
1	3	Erika Torrellas	Venezuela	1:01.72	Q
2	4	Katarina Listopadova	Slovakia	1:02.12	Q
3	5	So Lizar	Puerto Rico	1:03.90	

=== Heat 2 ===
Rank	Lane	Name	Nationality	Time	Notes
1	4	Eleanoe Faulkner	Great Britain	1:05.78	
2	3	Khadeja Phillip	Trinidad and Tobago	1:06.35	
3	6	Lara Butler	Cayman Islands	1:07.59	
4	5	Gessica Stagno	Mozambique	1:10.46	
5	2	Sonie Akter	Bangladesh	1:14.52	
6	7	Surennyam Erdenebileg	Mongolia		DSQ

=== Heat 3 ===
Rank	Lane	Name	Nationality	Time	Notes
1	4	Rachael Kelly	Great Britain	1:01.30	Q
2	3	Katja Hajdinjak	Slovenia	1:02.06	Q
3	8	Patarawadee Kittiya	Thailand	1:02.60	
4	2	Danielle Villars	Switzerland	1:02.80	
5	5	Anna Schegoleva	Cyprus	1:02.92	
6	6	Bruna Rocha	Brazil	1:03.07	
7	7	Diana Ambrus	Hungary	1:04.14	
8	1	Bryndis Run Hansen	Iceland	1:05.56	

=== Heat 4 ===
Rank	Lane	Name	Nationality	Time	Notes
1	3	Judit Ignacio	Spain	1:00.93	Q
2	4	Liu Lan	China	1:01.24	Q
3	7	Lovisa Eriksson	Sweden	1:01.24	Q
4	6	Alessia Polieri	Italy	1:01.49	Q
5	5	Anna Marti	Spain	1:02.12	Q
6	2	Noora Laukkanen	Finland	1:02.30	Q
7	8	Katarina Simonovic	Serbia	1:05.49	
8	1	Arhatha Magavi	India	1:09.35	

=== Heat 5 ===
Rank	Lane	Name	Nationality	Time	Notes
1	6	Lindsay Delmar	Canada	1:00.69	Q
2	3	Elena di Liddo	Italy	1:00.98	Q
3	2	Kristina Kochetkova	Russia	1:01.08	Q
4	8	Thi Kim Tuyen Nguyen	Vietnam	1:01.40	Q
5	4	Lena Kalla	Germany	1:01.71	Q
6	5	Zoe Johnson	Australia	1:02.31	Q
7	7	Mayuko Okada	Japan	1:03.75	
8	8	Jasmine Alkhaldi	Philippines	1:04.41	

== Semifinals ==
=== Semifinal 1 ===
Rank	Lane	Name	Nationality	Time	Notes
1	4	Judit Ignacio	Spain	1:00.87	Q
2	5	Kristina Kochetkova	Russia	1:00.99	Q
3	7	Katarina Listopadova	Slovakia	1:01.27	Q
4	3	Rachael Kelly	Great Britain	1:01.30	Q
5	6	Alessia Polieri	Italy	1:01.44	
6	2	Erika Torrellas	Venezuela	1:01.78	
7	1	Noora Laukkanen	Finland	1:02.33	
	8	Patarawadee Kittiya	Thailand		DNS

=== Semifinal 2 ===
Rank	Lane	Name	Nationality	Time	Notes
1	3	Liu Lan	China	1:00.28	Q
2	4	Lindsay Delmar	Canada	1:00.62	Q
3	5	Elena di Liddo	Italy	1:00.95	Q
4	1	Anna Marti	Spain	1:01.41	Q
5	7	Katja Hajdinjak	Slovenia	1:01.50	
6	6	Thi Kim Tuyen Nguyen	Vietnam	1:01.56	
7	2	Lena Kalla	Germany	1:01.94	
8	8	Zoe Johnson	Australia	1:02.24	

== Final ==
Rank	Lane	Name	Nationality	Time	Notes
1st place, gold medalist(s)	4	Liu Lan	China	59.67	
2nd place, silver medalist(s)	3	Judit Ignacio	Spain	1:00.07	
3rd place, bronze medalist(s)	1	Rachael Kelly	Great Britain	1:00.26	
4	7	Katarina Listopadova	Slovakia	1:00.35	
5	5	Lindsay Delmar	Canada	1:00.37	
6	2	Kristina Kochetkova	Russia	1:01.04	
7	8	Anna Marti	Spain	1:01.38	
	6	Elena di Liddo	Italy		DSQ
