= Swimming at the 2010 Summer Youth Olympics – Girls' 50 metre butterfly =

The girls' 50 metre butterfly event at the 2010 Youth Olympic Games took place on August 17–18, at the Singapore Sports School.

== Medalists ==
Gold	Liu Lan; China	26.97
Silver	Elena di Liddo; Italy	27.06
Bronze	Anna Santamans; France	27.31

== Heats ==
=== Heat 1 ===
Rank	Lane	Name	Nationality	Time	Notes
1	6	Lovisa Eriksson	Sweden	27.44	Q
2	4	Liu Lan	China	27.81	Q
3	2	Anna Santamans	France	27.94	Q
4	5	Katarina Listopadova	Slovakia	28.06	Q
5	3	Rachael Kelly	Great Britain	28.14	Q
6	1	Aina Filsrabetsara	Madagascar	30.54	
7	7	Sonia Aktar	Bangladesh	32.93	

=== Heat 2 ===
Rank	Lane	Name	Nationality	Time	Notes
1	4	Elena di Liddo	Italy	27.25	Q
2	3	Bruna Rocha	Brazil	28.23	Q
3	2	Zoe Johnson	Australia	28.40	Q
4	5	Anna Schegoleva	Cyprus	28.57	Q
5	6	Bryndis Run Hansen	Iceland	28.60	Q
6	7	Khadeja Phillip	Trinidad and Tobago	30.04	
7	8	Kathryn Millin	Swaziland	30.31	
8	1	Surennyam Erdenebileg	Mongolia	36.12	

=== Heat 3 ===
Rank	Lane	Name	Nationality	Time	Notes
1	2	Katja Hajdinjak	Slovenia	28.17	Q
1	3	Lindsay Delmar	Canada	28.17	Q
3	5	Anna Marti	Spain	28.26	Q
4	6	Danielle Villars	Switzerland	28.64	Q
5	4	Lena Kalla	Germany	28.75	Q
6	7	Amanda Lim	Singapore	29.48	Q
7	1	Sabine Hazboun	Palestine	31.88	
8	8	Reni Jani	Albania	34.43	

== Semifinals ==
=== Semifinal 1 ===
Rank	Lane	Name	Nationality	Time	Notes
1	4	Lovisa Eriksson	Sweden	27.27	Q
2	5	Anna Santamans	France	27.51	Q
3	3	Rachael Kelly	Great Britain	27.67	Q
4	6	Katja Hajdinjak	Slovenia	27.76	Q
5	2	Anna Marti	Spain	28.25	
6	1	Danielle Villars	Switzerland	28.59	
7	7	Anna Schegoleva	Cyprus	28.80	
8	8	Amanda Lim	Singapore	29.34	

=== Semifinal 2 ===
Rank	Lane	Name	Nationality	Time	Notes
1	4	Elena di Liddo	Italy	26.88	Q
2	5	Liu Lan	China	27.15	Q
3	3	Katarina Listopadova	Slovakia	27.79	Q
4	6	Lindsay Delmar	Canada	28.02	Q
5	2	Bruna Rocha	Brazil	28.09	
6	8	Lena Kalla	Germany	28.31	
7	7	Zoe Johnson	Australia	28.43	
8	1	Bryndis Run Hansen	Iceland	28.53	

== Final ==
Rank	Lane	Name	Nationality	Time	Notes
1st place, gold medalist(s)	5	Liu Lan	China	26.97	
2nd place, silver medalist(s)	4	Elena di Liddo	Italy	27.06	
3rd place, bronze medalist(s)	6	Anna Santamans	France	27.31	
4	1	Katarina Listopadova	Slovakia	27.38	
5	8	Lindsay Delmar	Canada	27.54	
6	3	Lovisa Eriksson	Sweden	27.55	
7	2	Rachael Kelly	Great Britain	27.77	
8	7	Katja Hajdinjak	Slovenia	27.86	
