= Swimming at the 2010 Summer Youth Olympics – Girls' 200 metre butterfly =

The girl's 200 metre butterfly event at the 2010 Youth Olympic Games took place on August 16, at the Singapore Sports School.

== Medalists ==
| Gold | Boglárka Kapás; Hungary | 2:08.72 |
| Silver | Judit Ignacio; Spain | 2:10.11 |
| Bronze | Liu Lan; China | 2:11.94 |

== Heats ==
=== Heat 1 ===
| Rank | Lane | Name | Nationality | Time | Notes |
|---|---|---|---|---|---|
| 1 | 4 | Judit Ignacio | Spain | 2:12.59 | Q |
| 2 | 3 | Diana Ambrus | Hungary | 2:13.88 | Q |
| 3 | 2 | Thi Kim Tuyen Nguyen | Vietnam | 2:15.53 | |
| 4 | 6 | Patarawadee Kittiya | Thailand | 2:15.99 | |
| 5 | 5 | Mayuko Okada | Japan | 2:18.72 | |
| 6 | 7 | Ting Chen | Chinese Taipei | 2:20.58 | |
| 7 | 8 | So Lizar | Puerto Rico | 2:21.25 | |
| 8 | 1 | Tieri Erasito | Fiji | 2:35.59 | |

=== Heat 2 ===
| Rank | Lane | Name | Nationality | Time | Notes |
|---|---|---|---|---|---|
| 1 | 6 | Lena Kalla | Germany | 2:15.39 | Q |
| 2 | 4 | Liu Lan | China | 2:15.51 | Q |
| 3 | 5 | Stefania Pirozzi | Italy | 2:15.59 | |
| 4 | 7 | Rachael Kelly | Great Britain | 2:16.95 | |
| 5 | 8 | Nesrine Khelifati | Tunisia | 2:20.67 | |
| 6 | 1 | Annick Van Westendorp | Switzerland | 2:20.91 | |
| 7 | 3 | Zoe Johnson | Australia | 2:21.54 | |
| - | 2 | Anna Schegoleva | Cyprus | - | DNS |

=== Heat 3 ===
| Rank | Lane | Name | Nationality | Time | Notes |
|---|---|---|---|---|---|
| 1 | 4 | Boglárka Kapás | Hungary | 2:11.97 | Q |
| 2 | 5 | Alessia Polieri | Italy | 2:14.14 | Q |
| 3 | 6 | Julia Gerotto | Brazil | 2:14.61 | Q |
| 4 | 3 | Lindsay Delmar | Canada | 2:14.86 | Q |
| 5 | 1 | Julia Hassler | Liechtenstein | 2:18.53 | |
| 6 | 2 | Barbora Závadová | Czech Republic | 2:18.55 | |
| 7 | 7 | Arhatha Magavi | India | 2:32.91 | |
| 8 | 8 | Karlene van der Jagt | Suriname | 2:37.17 | |

== Final ==
| Rank | Lane | Name | Nationality | Time | Notes |
|---|---|---|---|---|---|
| 1st place, gold medalist(s) | 4 | Boglárka Kapás | Hungary | 2:08.72 | |
| 2nd place, silver medalist(s) | 5 | Judit Ignacio | Spain | 2:10.11 | |
| 3rd place, bronze medalist(s) | 8 | Liu Lan | China | 2:11.94 | |
| 4 | 3 | Diana Ambrus | Hungary | 2:12.90 | |
| 5 | 2 | Julia Gerotto | Brazil | 2:13.74 | |
| 6 | 1 | Lena Kalla | Germany | 2:14.11 | |
| 7 | 6 | Alessia Polieri | Italy | 2:15.01 | |
| 7 | 7 | Lindsay Delmar | Canada | 2:15.01 | |
