= Lynette Lim =

Singaporean swimmer

Personal information
- Full name: Lynette Lim Shu-En
- Nationality: Singapore
- Born: 25 April 1992 (age 34) Loma Linda, CA
- Height: 5 ft 5 in (165 cm)

Sport
- Sport: Swimming
- College team: USC Trojans
Medal record
SEA Games
Gold medal – first place	2009 Vientiane	800m freestyle
Gold medal – first place	2009 Vientiane	4x100m freestyle relay
Gold medal – first place	2009 Vientiane	4x200m freestyle relay
Gold medal – first place	2013 Naypyidaw	4x200m freestyle relay
Silver medal – second place	2007 Nakhon Ratchasima	800m freestyle
Silver medal – second place	2007 Nakhon Ratchasima	4x200m freestyle relay
Silver medal – second place	2009 Vientiane	400m freestyle
Silver medal – second place	2013 Naypyidaw	4x100m freestyle relay
Bronze medal – third place	2013 Naypyidaw	200m freestyle
Bronze medal – third place	2013 Naypyidaw	400m freestyle
Asian Youth Games
Gold medal – first place	2009 Singapore	400m Freestyle
Gold medal – first place	2009 Singapore	4X100m Freestyle Relay

Lynette Lim Shu En (Lim Shu-En, Chinese: 林淑恩, born 25 April 1992) is an Olympic freestyle swimmer from Singapore. She swam for Singapore at the 2012 and 2008 Summer Olympics, the 2009 and 2007 World Championships, and the 2007 South East Asian Games.

As of 2009, she holds the Singaporean Records in the women's 400m, 800m, and 1500m freestyles, and 4 × 100 m, 4 × 200 m freestyle relays.

== Early years ==
Lim attended Palm Springs High School in Palm Springs, California. She was in the class of 2010. She swam for the Piranha Swim Team in Palm Springs and the high school swim team for Palm Springs. Lim attended the University of Southern California, graduating in 2014 with a degree in kinesiology, and was on the USC swimming and diving team as a distance freestyler. During her career at USC she was a three-time all-American on relay.
