= Zoltán Szilágyi (swimmer) =

Hungarian swimmer

Personal information
- Full name: Szilágyi Zoltán
- Nationality: Hungarian
- Born: 21 June 1967 (age 59) Budapest
- Height: 1.88 m (6 ft 2 in)
- Weight: 80 kg (176 lb)

Sport
- Sport: Swimming
- Strokes: Freestyle
- Club: Budapesti Honvéd Sportegyesület; Budapesti Vasutas Sport Club; Ferencvárosi Torna Club-Print 17
Medal record
European Junior Championships (LC)
Gold medal – first place	1982 Innsbruck	1500 m freestyle
Silver medal – second place	1982 Innsbruck	200 m freestyle
Silver medal – second place	1982 Innsbruck	400 m freestyle
Silver medal – second place	1983 Mulhouse	200 m freestyle
Bronze medal – third place	1983 Mulhouse	400 m freestyle

Zoltán Szilágyi (born 21 June 1967 in Budapest) is a former freestyle swimmer from Hungary, who competed in the 1988, 1992, 2000 Summer Olympics. His daughter, Liliána Szilágyi is also a professional swimmer, specializing in butterfly events. In December 2021, his daughter accused him of abusing her mentally, physically and sexually since she was a young child. In a subsequent statement, he denied the accusations, and threatened to sue his daughter. The Hungarian Swimming Association also released a statement and promised to launch an investigation into the matter.
