= Kristel Vourna =

Greek swimmer (born 1992)

Medal record

Women's Swimming

Representing Greece

Mediterranean Games
Silver medal – second place	2013 Mersin	4x100 m freestyle

Kristel Vourna (born 11 February 1992) is a Greek swimmer. At the 2012 Summer Olympics in London, she competed in the Women's 100 metre butterfly. She took the 12th place overall, finishing 7th in the second semifinal in the 100 metre butterfly with a Greek record of 58.31 seconds. She also swam the anchor leg of Greece's 4 x 100 freestyle relay, but the team failed to qualify for the final, finishing in the 16th place.

At the 2012 European Championships in Debrecen, she took the 5th place in 100 metre butterfly, the 6th place in 50 metre butterfly and the 5th place in 4 x 100 freestyle relay.

At the 2016 Summer Olympics, she competed in the women's 100 metre butterfly event where she finished 22nd in the heats and did not advance. Her qualification was complicated by an administrative error by FINA. She was informed that she had qualified by achieving the B standard time, but FINA then stated that for two athletes to qualify for one nation, both had to achieve the A standard time. Following appeals by the Greek Olympic committee, she was allowed to compete.

She studied at the University of Alabama.

== Honours ==
Year	Competition	Venue	Position	Notes
Representing Greece
2012	European Championships	Debrecen, Hungary	5th	100 m butterfly
2012	European Championships	Debrecen, Hungary	5th	4 x 100 freestyle relay
2012	European Championships	Debrecen, Hungary	6th	50 m butterfly
2012	Olympic Games	London, United Kingdom	12th (sf)	100 m butterfly
2012	Olympic Games	London, United Kingdom	16th (sf)	4 x 100 freestyle relay
2013	Mediterranean Games	Mersin, Turkey	2nd	4 x 100 freestyle relay
2016	Olympic Games	Rio de Janeiro, Brazil	23rd (h)	100 m butterfly
