= Liu Lan =

Chinese swimmer

Personal information
- Born: January 18, 1993 (age 33) Guangdong, China

Sport
- Sport: Swimming
- Strokes: Butterfly
Medal record
Swimming
Representing China
Summer Youth Olympics
Gold medal – first place	2010 Singapore	Girls' 50m butterfly
Gold medal – first place	2010 Singapore	Girls' 100m butterfly
Gold medal – first place	2010 Singapore	Girls' 4x100m freestyle relay
Gold medal – first place	2010 Singapore	Mixed 4x100m freestyle relay
Gold medal – first place	2010 Singapore	Mixed 4x100m medley relay
Bronze medal – third place	2010 Singapore	Girls' 200m butterfly
Asian Games
Bronze medal – third place	2014 Incheon	Women's 50m butterfly
Asian Youth Games
Gold medal – first place	2009 Singapore	Girls' 50m butterfly
Gold medal – first place	2009 Singapore	Girls' 200m butterfly
Bronze medal – third place	2009 Singapore	Girls' 100m butterfly

Liu Lan (Chinese: 刘兰; pinyin: Liú Lán) is a Chinese swimmer. She has won several gold medals.

== Medals ==
- Gold medal in the Girls' 50 metre butterfly event at the 2009 Asian Youth Games
- Gold medal in the Girls' 50 metre butterfly event at the 2010 Summer Youth Olympics
- Gold medal in the Mixed 4 x 100 metre freestyle relay event at the 2010 Summer Youth Olympics
- Gold medal in the Girls' 4 x 100 metre freestyle relay event at the 2010 Summer Youth Olympics
- Gold medal in the Girls' 100 metre butterfly event at the 2010 Summer Youth Olympics
- Gold medal in the Mixed 4 x 100 metre medley relay event at the 2010 Summer Youth Olympics
- Bronze medal in the Girls' 200 metre butterfly event at the 2010 Summer Youth Olympics
