= Asker SK (swimming) =

Swimming club based in Asker, Norway

Logo.

Asker Svømmeklubb is a swimming club based in Asker, Norway. With about 1800 members, at present ASK is one of the biggest swimming clubs in Norway according to memberships, second only to its neighbour Bærumssvømmerne.

It was founded in 1957. In the seventies and eighties, ASK was the dominating club in Norwegian swimming, with athletes like Øyvind Miller, Lasse Nagell, Knut Arne Landbøe, Fredrik Sørvig, Haakon Schram-Stokke, Kristine Moen and Karina Samuelsen. In the nineties ASK experienced a downfall, and one of their training-facilities, Bondihallen, was shut down due to poor maintenance. Still the club fostered talents, and swimmers like Aleksander Hetland and Andre Bratgjerd developed their skills at Asker before transferring to other clubs.

Around the year 2000 ASK again began climbing to the top. Coach Øyvind Marstein took charge in Asker and under his leadership the environment blossomed. Marstein scouted Kenneth Olsen for the top position as head coach, and presented him with a large number of talented swimmers whom he had prepared for him.

At the Nationals in 2006 (NM Langbane), ASK took 20 medals (7 gold, 8 silver and 5 bronze). Swimmers like Ingvild Snildal, Michael Poulsen, Christian Aaserud, Siri-Eva Kristiansen, Joachim Haugen and Ola Riise are now top in their classes.

ASK's over 1300 members have an experienced team of coaches. Head coaches of today are Kenneth Olsen, Michael Poulsen, Martin Skavang and Ulf Riise. There are five assistant coaches and over 40 swimming instructors and assistant instructors who every day coach and teach swimming at top level.
