= Franziska Hentke =

German swimmer

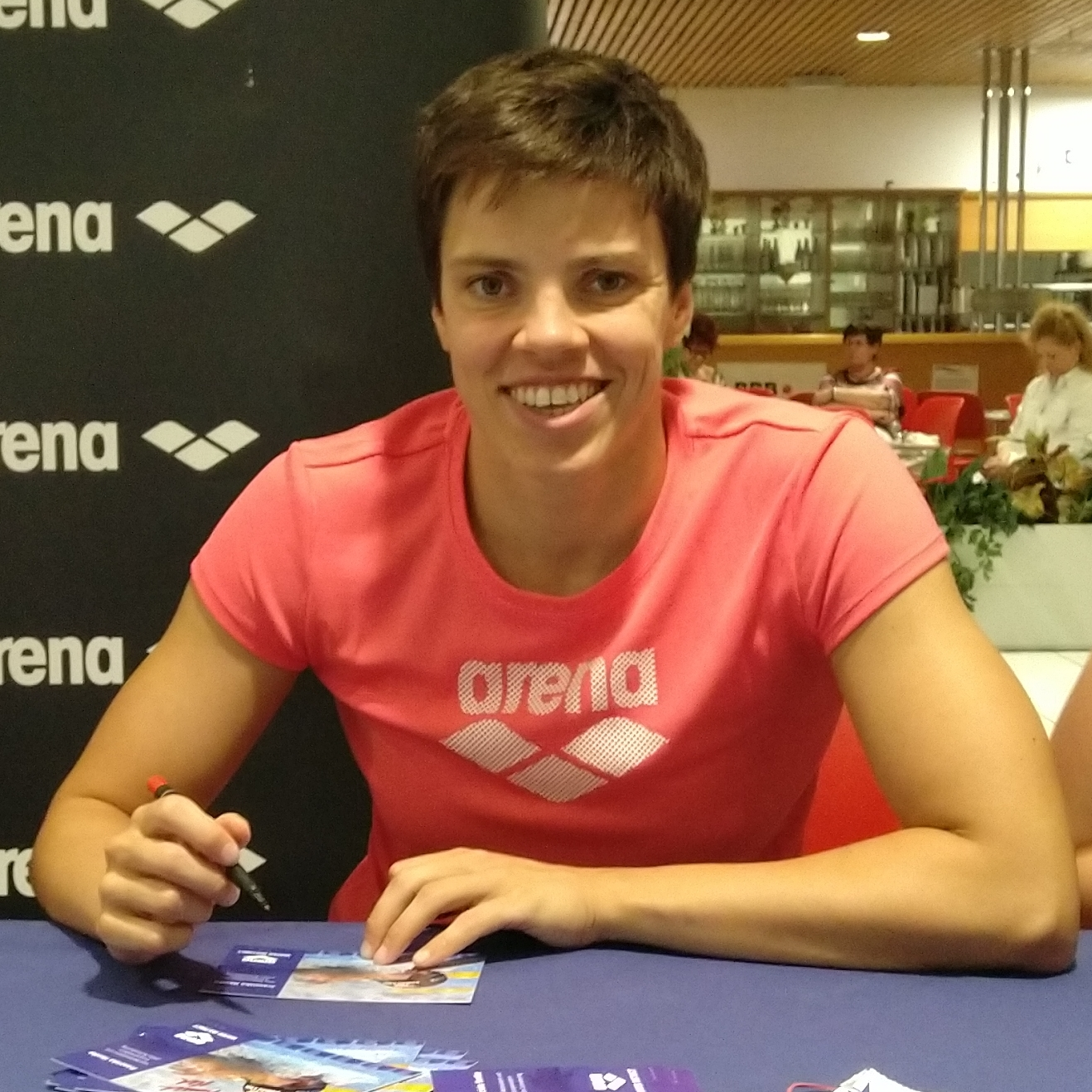
- Hentke signs autographs in 2018

Personal information
- Nationality: German
- Born: 4 June 1989 (age 37) Wolfen, East Germany
- Height: 1.69 m (5 ft 7 in)

Sport
- Sport: Swimming
- Strokes: Butterfly
- Club: SC Magdeburg
Medal record
Women's swimming
Representing Germany
Event	1st	2nd	3rd
World Championships (SC)	0	0	1
European Championships (LC)	1	0	0
European Championships (SC)	2	1	1
Total	3	1	2
World Championships (LC)
Silver medal – second place	2017 Budapest	200 m butterfly
World Championships (SC)
Bronze medal – third place	2014 Doha	200 m butterfly
European Championships (LC)
Gold medal – first place	2016 London	200 m butterfly
European Championships (SC)
Gold medal – first place	2015 Netanya	200 m butterfly
Gold medal – first place	2017 Copenhagen	200 m butterfly
Silver medal – second place	2013 Herning	200 m butterfly
Bronze medal – third place	2009 Istanbul	200 m butterfly

Franziska Hentke (born 4 June 1989) is a German former butterfly swimmer.

== Career ==
In July 2015, Hentke broke the German record in the 200-meter butterfly (long course) with a time of 2:05.26.

At the 2015 World Aquatics Championships in Kazan, Russia, she finished tied 4th in this event.

At the 2015 European Short Course Championships she won her first international title, in the 200 m butterfly. In the final she broke her own national record with a time of 2:03.01, making her the sixth fastest performer all-time in this event. She also competed in the 400 m individual medley, and finished 7th.

Hentke won her first international long-course title, in the 200 meter butterfly, at the 2016 European Aquatics Championships in London. She beat Hungarian Liliána Szilágyi by 0.01 s.

At the 2016 Summer Olympics, Hentke finished 11th in the semifinals of the 200 m butterfly and did not qualify for the final.

She finished 13th in the 200 m butterfly at the 2020 Summer Olympics and retired from swimming afterwards.
