= Eva Hannesdóttir =

Icelandic swimmer

Personal information
- Born: December 3, 1987 (age 38) Reykjavík, Iceland

Sport
- Sport: Swimming

Eva Hannesdóttir (born 3 December 1987) is an Icelandic freestyle swimmer. She competed in the 4 × 100 metre medley relay event at the 2012 Summer Olympics.
