= Fibriani Ratna Marita =

Indonesian swimmer (born 1994)

Fibriani Marita
Personal information
- Full name: Fibriani Ratna Marita
- Born: 24 February 1994 (age 32) Malang, Indonesia
- Height: 1.69 m (5 ft 7 in)
- Weight: 62 kg (137 lb)

Sport
- Country: Indonesia
- Sport: Swimming
- Strokes: Individual medley
Medal record
Women's swimming
Representing Indonesia
ASEAN University Games
Silver medal – second place	2012 Vientiane	4x100 m medley

Fibriani Ratna Marita (born 24 February 1994) is an Indonesian swimmer, who specialized in individual medley events. She represented her nation Indonesia at the 2008 Summer Olympics and the inaugural 2010 Summer Youth Olympics, and has also set two Indonesian records in both 200 and 400 m individual medley at the 2009 Southeast Asian Games.

At age fourteen, Marita became one of the youngest swimmers to mark their official debut at the 2008 Summer Olympics in Beijing, competing in the women's 200 m individual medley. Swimming on the outside in heat one, Marita closed out the field with a slowest time of 2:28.18, just five seconds behind Chinese Taipei's Lin Man-hsu. Marita, however, failed to advance into the semi-finals, as she placed thirty-eighth in the overall rankings.

Marita set two national records in the medley double at the 2009 Southeast Asian Games in Vientiane, Laos. She also missed out of the medal contention, when she finished fourth in the 200 m individual medley, with her personal best time of 2:21.00.

In 2010, Marita had a greater opportunity to participate in the first-ever Youth Olympic Games in Singapore, after securing her ticket from the Singapore National Age Group Championships, with a time of 2:23.98. She swam in the girls' 200 m individual medley, finishing fifth and sixteenth overall in the preliminary heats, outside her personal best of 2:23.92, six hundredths of a second ahead of her qualifying time.
