= Kang Yeong-seo =

South Korean swimmer (born 1994)

Personal information
- Full name: Kang Yeong-seo
- National team: South Korea
- Born: 16 April 1994 (age 32) Seoul, South Korea
- Height: 1.55 m (5 ft 1 in)
- Weight: 39 kg (86 lb)

Korean name
- Hangul: 강영서
- RR: Gang Yeongseo
- MR: Kang Yŏngsŏ

Sport
- Sport: Swimming
- Strokes: Backstroke

Kang Yeong-seo (Korean: 강영서; born April 16, 1994) is a South Korean swimmer, who specialized in backstroke events. Kang became one the youngest ever swimmers in history (aged 14) to be selected to the South Korean team at the 2008 Summer Olympics, finishing among the top thirty in the distance dorsal.

Kang competed for the South Korean swimming team in the women's 200 m backstroke at the 2008 Summer Olympics in Beijing. Leading up to the Games, she blasted the field with a remarkable 2:17.10 to earn her selection to the nation's Olympic team and register under the FINA B-cut (2:17.40) by exactly 0.3 of a second at the Dong-A Swimming Championships in Ulsan. Kang touched out the hard-charging Guatemalan swimmer Gisela Morales at the wall by the smallest of margins (0.02) to win the opening heat, posting a new personal best of 2:14.52. Despite her impressive swim from the prelims, Kang fell short of the semifinal field with a twenty-sixth overall position.
