= Amit Ivry =

Israeli swimmer (born 1989)

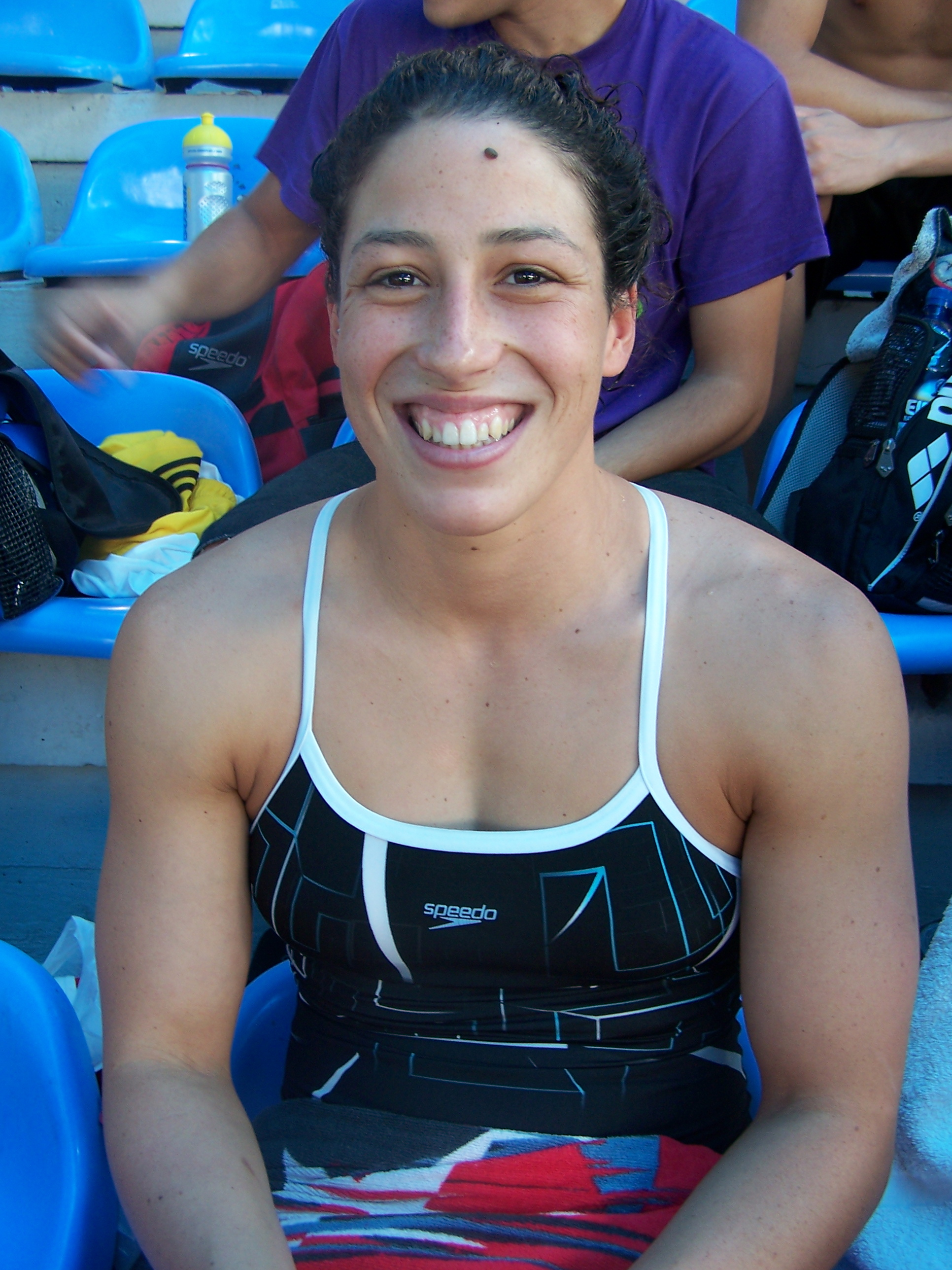
- Amit Ivry, 2010

Personal information
- Native name: עמית עברי
- Nationality: Israel
- Born: September 2, 1989 (age 37) Eilat, Israel
- Height: 1.70 m (5 ft 7 in)
- Weight: 67 kg (148 lb)

Sport
- Sport: Swimming
- Strokes: 100 m backstroke, 100 m breaststroke, 100 m butterfly, 100 m medley, 200 metres Individual Medley, 50 m backstroke, 50 m breaststroke, 50 m butterfly
- Club: Hapoel Emek Hefer, Israel
- Coach: Leonid Kaufman
Medal record
Women's swimming
Representing Israel
Maccabiah Games
Gold medal – first place	2009 Israel	100 m butterfly
Gold medal – first place	2017 Israel	100 m butterfly
Bronze medal – third place	2013 Israel	100 m freestyle
European Aquatics Championships
Bronze medal – third place	2012 Debrecen	100 metre butterfly

Amit Ivry (Hebrew: עמית עברי; born September 2, 1989, in Eilat, Israel) is an Israeli Olympic swimmer, Maccabiah Games champion, and national record holder. She competes in the butterfly, backstroke, breaststroke, and medley.

Ivry won a gold medal at the 2009 Maccabiah Games in the Women's 100 m butterfly, and a bronze medal at the 2013 Maccabiah Games in the Women's 100 m freestyle. In 2012, she won a bronze medal in the 100 m butterfly at the long-course European Swimming Championships.

She holds the Maccabiah Games and Israeli records in the Women's 100 m butterfly. She also holds the Israeli national records in the Women's 50 m backstroke, 50 m breaststroke, 100 m breaststroke, 200 m Individual Medley, and 4 × 100 m medley relay.

== Swimming career ==
=== Early years; Maccabiah gold medal ===
Ivry won a gold medal in the 2009 Maccabiah Games in the Women's 100 m butterfly, with a time of 58.50. One month later, in August 2009, she and three teammates set a new Israeli record in the 4x100 Medley relay, breaking the old record by five seconds, with a time of 4:09.49 minutes.

In December 2010, she set the Israeli national record in the Women's 100 m butterfly, with a time of 57.14. In February 2011, she and her teammates at Hapoel Emek Hefer set an Israeli record in the 4x50 meter medley, with a time of 1:57.80 minutes, at the Israel Short Course Championships at Ashdot Yaakov.

=== 2012; Olympics ===
In 2012, she won a bronze medal in the 100-meter butterfly at the long-course European Swimming Championships in Hungary, with a time of at 58.64 seconds, and became the first Israeli women to place and win a medal for Israel at the championships.

At the 2012 Summer Olympics, she finished 18th overall in the heats in the Women's 100 metre butterfly. In the 200 metre individual medley, Ivry placed 13th in the heats and reached the semi-final, becoming the first Israeli female swimmer to compete in an Olympic semi-final, with a new Israeli record time of 2:13.29 minutes.

=== 2013; World Cup medals, and controversy ===
In July 2013, in the women's 50-meter sprint breaststroke Ivry won a bronze medal with a 31.95, matching the Israeli national record. Later that month, she won a bronze medal at the 2013 Maccabiah Games in the Women's 100 m freestyle, with a time of 57.19. That same month, at the world swimming championships in Barcelona, she set a new Israeli record in the 100 m breaststroke, swimming the distance in a time of 1:08.52, besting the previous record of Yuliya Banach by 41 hundredths of a second.

In August 2013, she set Israeli women's records in the 50 m backstroke, with a time of 28.51, and in the 50 m breaststroke, with a time of 31.66, at the Israeli Summer Nationals.

In October 2013, Ivry won a bronze medal in the 2013 FINA Swimming World Cup event in Dubai, United Arab Emirates, setting a new national record in the 100 m breaststroke final.

Later that month, she finished 2nd and won a silver medal in women's 100 meter mixed individual medley in the FINA Swimming World Cup in swimming in Doha, Qatar, breaking the Israeli national record at 58.43 seconds at the Hamad Aquatic Center. The Quatari hosts refused to broadcast the Israeli flag, and a [blank white square, rather than the Israeli flag, appeared next to her name on the TV screens airing the event. The Israeli flag was also removed from outside the aquatic center at the FINA event.

The FINA Code of Ethics states that Fédération Internationale de Natation tournaments must have: "no discrimination on the basis of ... race, religion, or political opinion". The incidents raised questions about whether Qatar should still host the 2014 World Short-Course Championships.

=== 2016; Olympics ===
Ivri represented Israel at the 2016 Olympics in the Women's 100 m butterfly, 100 m breaststroke, 200 m breaststroke, and 4 × 100 m freestyle.

=== 2017; Maccabiah gold and silver medals ===
Ivry won the gold medal in the women's 100m butterfly at the 2017 Maccabiah Games, with a time of 59.37. Ivry, Keren Siebner, Shahar Menahem, and Or Tamir set an Israeli national record in the women's 4 × 100 m medley relay with a time of 4:11.67 as they won a silver medal.

=== Records ===
==== Maccabiah ====
- Girls (age 13–16) 100 m butterfly (58.50 on July 20, 2009)
- Women's 100 m butterfly (58.21 on August 8, 2009)

==== National ====
- Girls (age 13–16) 100 m butterfly (58.50 on July 20, 2009)
- Women's 100 m butterfly (57.14 in December 2010)
- Women's 50 m breaststroke (31.66 in August 2013).
- Women's 100 m breaststroke (1:08.52 in July 2013)
- Women's 50 m backstroke (28.51 in August 2013)
- Women's 200 m Individual Medley (2:13.29 on July 30, 2012)
- Women's 4x100 Medley relay (4:09.49 minutes on August 1, 2009).

== Personal life ==
Ivry's great-grandmother, Miriam Roth, authored a number of classic children's books known by Israelis, including "Hot Corn," "Yael's Home," and "Story of Five Balloons." Ivry's love is cooking, and she hopes to be a chef.

Ivri is bisexual.

Her coach was Assaf Meimon from the age of 12 to 21, when she switched to Leonid Kaufman.

== See also ==
- List of Israeli records in swimming
