= Ingvild Snildal =

Norwegian swimmer (born 1988)

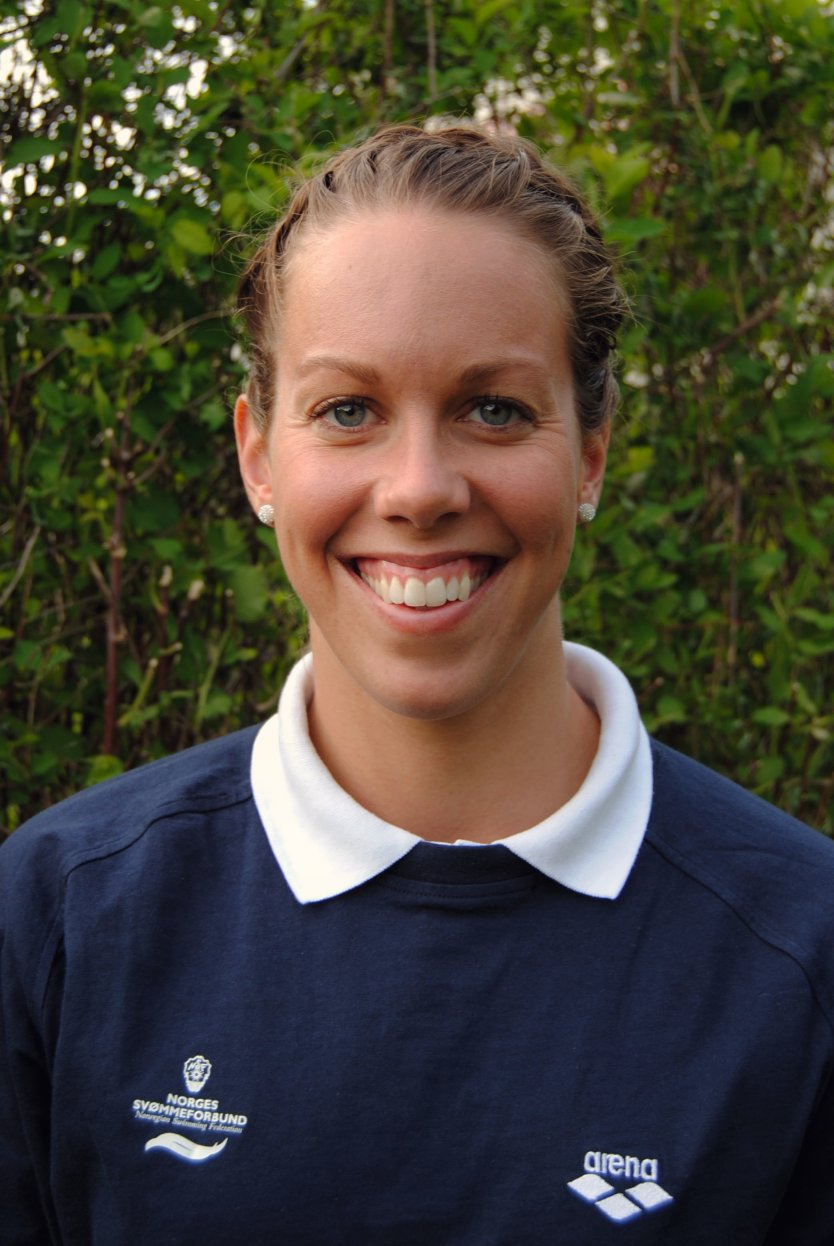

Personal information
- Full name: Ingvild Snildal
- Nationality: Norway
- Born: 25 August 1988 (age 37) Asker, Norway
- Height: 1.78 m (5 ft 10 in)

Sport
- Sport: Swimming
- Strokes: Butterfly, Freestyle, IM
- Club: Asker SK
Medal record
World Championships (LC)
Bronze medal – third place	2009 Rome	50 m butterfly
European Championships (LC)
Gold medal – first place	2012 Debrecen	100 m butterfly
Bronze medal – third place	2012 Debrecen	50 m butterfly
European Championships (SC)
Silver medal – second place	2010 Eindhoven	100 m butterfly
Bronze medal – third place	2009 Istanbul	50 m butterfly

Ingvild Snildal (born 25 August 1988 in Asker, Norway) is a Norwegian swimmer. She won gold in 100 m butterfly at the 2012 European Aquatics Championships. This was her 5th international medal. Her club team is Asker svømmeklubb. She holds Norwegian medals in long and short course.

== Swimming accomplishments ==
- Gold, silver and bronze medals from European Championships
- Bronze from World Championships
- 49 gold medals in National Championships, 11 silver and 5 bronze
- Swam for Norway at the 2008 Olympics and the 2012 Olympics in London.

== National records ==
She took her first national record on 27 May 2006, with a time of 30,38 in the 50 m backstroke. As of 30 May 2012 she had taken 75 national records. At the moment she holds 12 senior records and 3 junior records, as well as 1 Nordic record.
