= Judit Ignacio =

Spanish swimmer

Judit Ignacio Sorribes
Personal information
- Born: 18 March 1994 (age 32) Barcelona, Spain

Sport
- Sport: Swimming
Medal record
European Championships
Silver medal – second place	2014 Berlin	200 m butterfly
Bronze medal – third place	2016 London	200 m butterfly
Youth Olympic Games
Silver medal – second place	2010 Singapur	100 m Butterfly
Silver medal – second place	2010 Singapur	200 m Butterfly
World Junior Championships
Gold medal – first place	2011 Lima	200 m Butterfly

Judit Ignacio Sorribes (born 18 March 1994) is a Spanish swimmer who competes in the women's 100-metre butterfly. At the 2012 Summer Olympics, she finished tied for 26th overall in the heats in the women's 100-metre butterfly and failed to reach the final.
