= Eszter Dara =

Hungarian swimmer (born 1990)

Personal information
- Full name: Dara Eszter
- Nationality: Hungary
- Born: 30 May 1990 (age 36) Budapest, Hungary
- Height: 1.87 m (6 ft 1 1/2 in)
- Weight: 67 kg (148 lb)

Sport
- Sport: Swimming
- Strokes: Freestyle, Butterfly
- Club: Kőbánya SC
Medal record
European Championships (LC)
Gold medal – first place	2010 Budapest	4×200 m freestyle
European Championships (SC)
Bronze medal – third place	2008 Rijeka	100 m butterfly

Eszter Dara (born 30 May 1990 in Budapest, Hungary) is a Hungarian swimmer, who competed for her country at the 2008 and 2012 Summer Olympics.

Dara won a bronze medal at the 2008 European Short Course Swimming Championships in 100 m butterfly. At the Summer Olympics she came 6th in 4×200 m freestyle relay.

In 2010 at the European Championships held in her hometown, Budapest she came fourth in the 4×100 m freestyle and became European champion as part of the 4×200 m freestyle relay team.
