= Liliána Szilágyi =

Hungarian swimmer

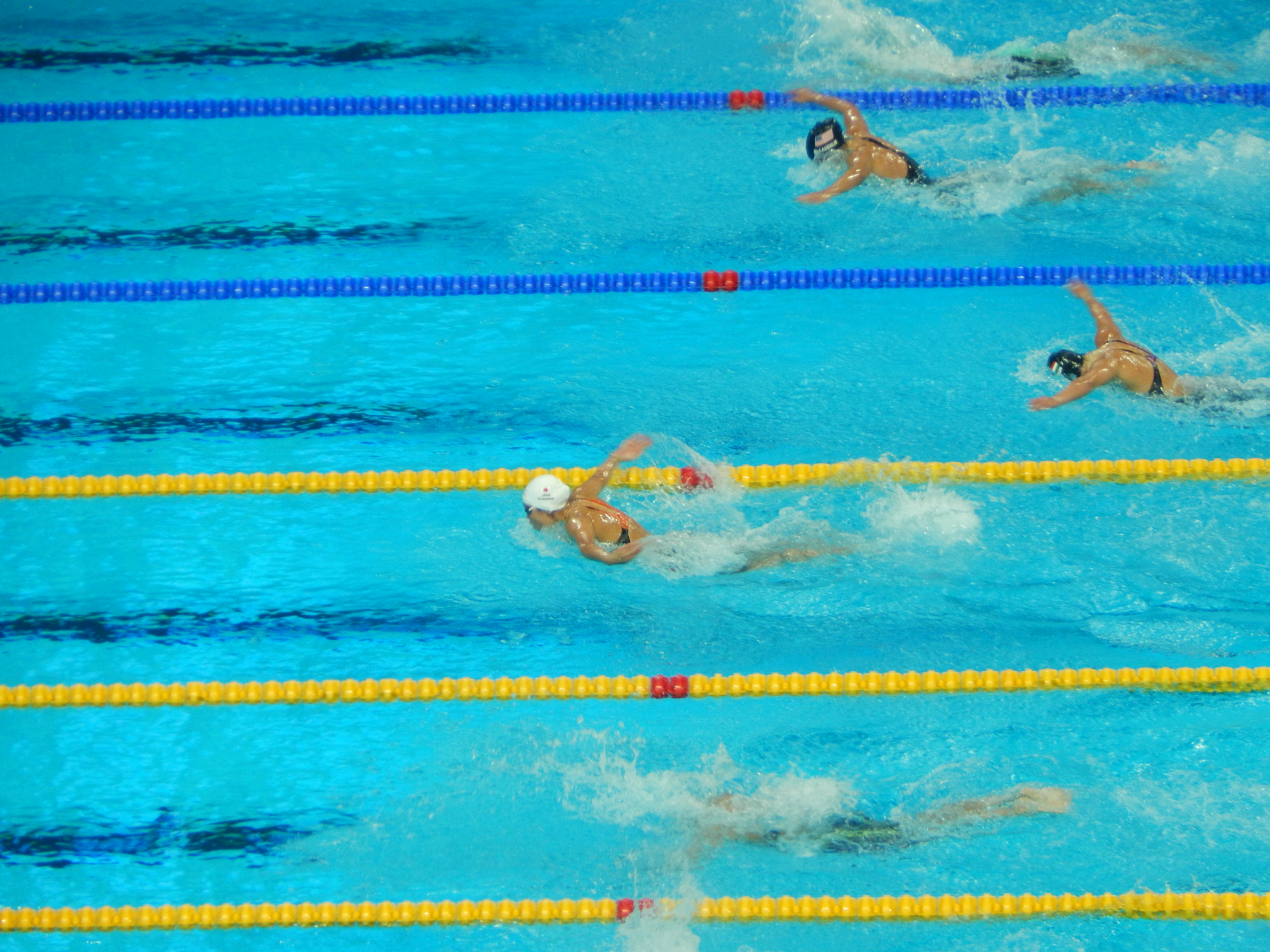
- Image of Szilágyi Liliánawhile swimming

Personal information
- Nationality: Hungary
- Born: 19 November 1996 (age 29) Budapest, Hungary
- Height: 1.72 m (5 ft 7 1/2 in)
- Weight: 55 kg (121 lb)

Sport
- Sport: Swimming
- Strokes: Butterfly
- Club: Széchy SE (–2009); A Jövő SE (2009–12); Kőbánya SC (2012–15); Bp. Honvéd (2016–18); Ferencvárosi TC (2019–)
- College team: Florida Gators
- Coach: András Gyenes, György Túri, Zoltán Szilágyi, László Kovács, József Szabó, János Egressy, Arilson Silva, Shane Tusup
Medal record
European Championships (LC)
Silver medal – second place	2016 London	200 m butterfly
Summer Youth Olympics
Gold medal – first place	2014 Nanjing	100 m butterfly
Gold medal – first place	2014 Nanjing	200 m butterfly
World Junior Championship
Silver medal – second place	2013 Dubai	100 m butterfly
Silver medal – second place	2013 Dubai	200 m butterfly
European Junior Championship
Gold medal – first place	2012 Antwerp	200 m butterfly
Silver medal – second place	2011 Belgrade	200 m butterfly
Silver medal – second place	2012 Antwerp	100 m butterfly

Liliána Szilágyi (born 19 November 1996) is a Hungarian swimmer, who specialized in the butterfly events.

== Career ==
She collected two medals (gold and silver) in the 100 and 200 m butterfly at the 2012 European Junior Swimming Championships in Antwerp, Belgium. Szilagyi is a member of Kőbánya Swimming Club in Budapest, and is coached and trained by Gyorgyi Turi. She is also the daughter of three-time Olympian and former freestyle swimmer Zoltán Szilágyi (1988, 1992, and 2000).

Szilagyi qualified for the women's 100 m butterfly at the 2012 Summer Olympics in London, by completing the event more quickly than the FINA B-standard entry time of 59.07 seconds from the European Championships in Debrecen. She competed with seven other swimmers on the third heat, including three-time Olympians Hannah Wilson of Hong Kong and former Olympic champion Otylia Jędrzejczak of Poland. She achieved sixth place ahead of Portugal's Sara Oliveira by a tenth of a second (0.10) in 1:00.34. Szilagyi failed to advance into the semifinals, as she placed thirty-fourth overall on the first day of preliminary heats.

In 2014, she represented Hungary at the 2014 Summer Youth Olympics held in Nanjing, China.

== Personal life ==
In December 2021, she released a statement claiming that her father, Zoltán Szilágyi have been abusing her mentally, physically and sexually since she was a young child. She claims that her mother had also been abused by him. Liliána and her mother moved out and left her father after the 2016 European Championships, while her younger sister was forced to stay with him. Liliána was advised not to sue for abuse (as these cases can take as long as a decade and mostly end with insignificant consequences for the abuser) He denied the accusations, and threatened to sue. The Hungarian Swimming Association promised to launch an investigation into the matter. Later they've come to the conclusion that Liliána is telling the truth and declared Zoltán Szilágyi as undesirable on events held by the Association.

In September 2022 the case entered court as her father decided to sue Liliána for defamation. In court Lilliána speaks of many counts of abuse from childhood up until the point she left with her mother. Zoltán Szilágyi's reactions to the accusations were smiling and at times, expressions of confusion, on this day he did not speak.

Liliána is fighting also to raise awareness on the flaws of a justice system that fails to protect victims of abuse. Hungary ranks second amongst EU countries in domestic violence, whose victims are mostly advised against suing due to lengthy proceedings and low expectancy on success.
