= Alessia Polieri =

Italian swimmer (born 1994)

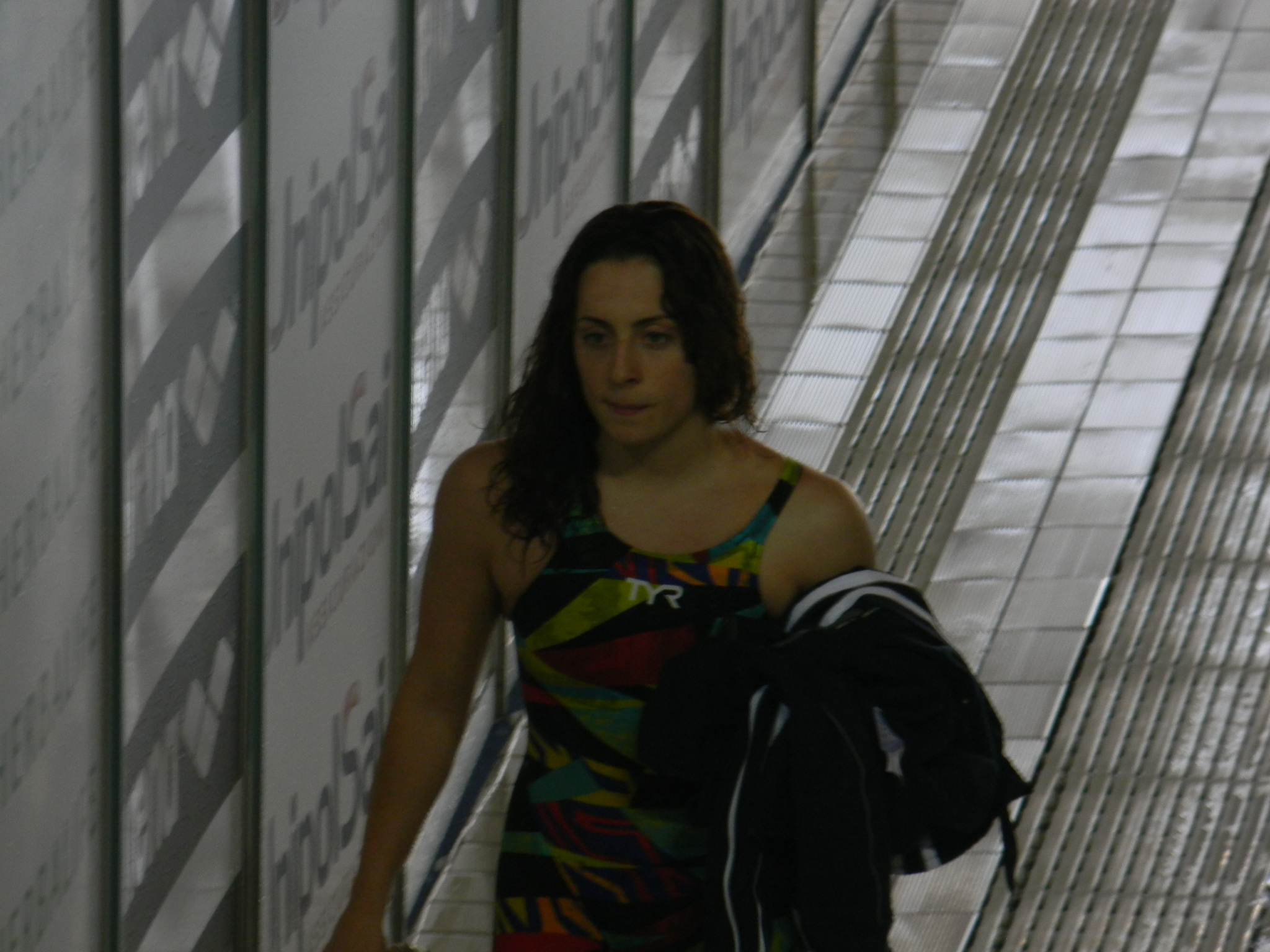
- Alessia Polieri in 2014

Personal information
- Born: 21 October 1994 (age 30); Castel San Pietro Terme, Italy

Sport
- Sport: Swimming

Alessia Polieri (born 21 October 1994) is an Italian swimmer. She competed in the women's 200 metre butterfly event at the 2016 Summer Olympics.
