= Danielle Villars =

Swiss swimmer (born 1993)

Personal information
- National team: Switzerland
- Born: 6 March 1993 (age 33) Zurich, Switzerland
- Height: 1.78 m (5 ft 10 in)
- Weight: 60 kg (132 lb)

Sport
- Sport: Swimming
- Strokes: Freestyle, butterfly
- Club: Limmat Sharks (SUI)
- College team: Southern Methodist University (USA)
- Coach: Dirk Reinicke

Danielle Villars (born 6 March 1993) is a Swiss swimmer who specialized in freestyle and butterfly events. She has won multiple Swiss titles and currently holds four national records in both freestyle and butterfly (100 and 200 m). Villars is a resident athlete for the Limmat Sharks, and is coached and trained by Dirk Reinicke.

Villars made her international debut at the 2010 Summer Youth Olympics in Singapore, where she rounded out the finale to eighth place in the 100 (57.72) and 200 m freestyle (2:04.89).

At the 2012 Summer Olympics in London, Villars maintained her program by qualifying for two swimming events. She posted FINA B-standard entry times of 59.57 (100 m butterfly) from the European Championships in Debrecen, Hungary, and 2:01.47 (200 m freestyle) from the Olympic trials in Zurich. In the 100 m butterfly, Villars broke her own Swiss record of 59.42 to share a top seed in the second heat and a twenty-sixth-place tie with Spain's Judit Ignacio Sorribes on the first day of the Games. In the 200 m freestyle, Villars raced to second place on the first heat by 1.06 seconds behind Thailand's Natthanan Junkrajang, outside her personal best of 2:03.55. Villars failed to advance into the semifinals, as she placed thirty-first overall in the preliminaries.

Shortly after her first Olympics, Villars attended Southern Methodist University in Dallas, Texas, where she was a biology major, and trained as a varsity swimmer for the SMU Mustangs.
