= Swimming at the 2009 World Aquatics Championships – Women's 100 metre freestyle =

Women's 100 metre freestyle at the 2009 World Aquatics Championships
- Venue: Foro Italico
- Dates: July 30, 2009 (heats & semifinals); July 31, 2009 (final)
- Winning time: 52.07 WR

Medalists
gold medal	Britta Steffen	Germany
silver medal	Francesca Halsall	Great Britain
bronze medal	Libby Trickett	Australia

The heats for the women's 100 m freestyle race at the 2009 World Championships took place on the morning of 30 July, with the final in the evening session of 31 July at the Foro Italico in Rome, Italy.

== Records ==
Prior to this competition, the existing world and competition records were as follows:

World record	Britta Steffen (GER)	52.56	Berlin, Germany	27 June 2009
Championship record	Natalie Coughlin (USA)	53.40	Melbourne, Australia	29 March 2007
Championship record	Libby Lenton (AUS)	53.40	Melbourne, Australia	30 March 2007

The following records were established during the competition:

Date	Round	Name	Nationality	Time	Record
26 July	Heat 4*	Francesca Halsall	(United Kingdom) Great Britain	53.02	CR
26 July	Final*	Britta Steffen	Germany	52.22	WR
31 July	Final	Britta Steffen	Germany	52.07	WR

* Split from the women's 4 × 100 m freestyle relay

== Results ==
=== Heats ===
Rank	Name	Nationality	Time	Heat	Lane	Notes
1	Amanda Weir	United States	53.20	16	6	AM
2	Libby Trickett	Australia	53.49	16	4	
3	Ranomi Kromowidjojo	Netherlands	53.61	17	6	
4	Britta Steffen	Germany	53.62	17	4	
5	Dana Vollmer	United States	53.69	15	3	
6	Jeanette Ottesen	Denmark	53.79	15	6	NR
7	Malia Metella	France	53.91	17	5	
7	Francesca Halsall	Great Britain	53.91	17	3	
9	Hanna-Maria Seppälä	Finland	53.94	15	5	
9	Evelyn Verrasztó	Hungary	53.94	16	3	NR
11	Daniela Schreiber	Germany	54.08	16	7	
12	Li Zhesi	China	54.10	15	7	
12	Hayley Palmer	New Zealand	54.10	16	1	NR
14	Victoria Poon	Canada	54.27	15	1	
15	Aleksandra Gerasimenya	Belarus	54.52	17	7	
16	Marieke Guehrer	Australia	54.60	16	2	
17	Anastasia Aksenova	Russia	54.70	15	8	NR
18	Josefin Lillhage	Sweden	54.87	17	2	
19	Arlene Semeco	Venezuela	54.92	14	1	SA
19	Dar'ya Stepanyuk	Ukraine	54.92	16	9	NR
21	Arianna Vanderpool-Wallace	Bahamas	54.96	14	6	NR
22	Tatiana Lemos	Brazil	55.02	16	8	
23	Heather MacLean	Canada	55.44	17	1	
24	Gabriella Fagundez	Sweden	55.45	17	8	
24	Miroslava Najdanovski	Serbia	55.45	17	0	
26	Birgit Koschischek	Austria	55.76	15	9	
27	Ragnheidur Ragnarsdottir	Iceland	55.78	14	7	
28	Katherine Wyld	Great Britain	55.83	14	3	
29	Lee Jae Young	South Korea	55.86	13	6	
30	Haruka Ueda	Japan	55.91	16	0	
31	Katarina Filova	Slovakia	56.00	13	8	
32	Vanessa García	Puerto Rico	56.01	11	3	
33	Liliana Ibanez	Mexico	56.04	13	7	NR
33	Sviatlana Khakhlova	Belarus	56.04	17	9	
35	Heysi Villareal	Cuba	56.12	10	6	
35	Nina Rangelova	Bulgaria	56.12	13	9	
37	Yayoi Matsumoto	Japan	56.20	14	4	
37	Katarzyna Wilk	Poland	56.20	15	0	
39	Anna Stylianou	Cyprus	56.29	13	1	
39	Quah Ting Wen	Singapore	56.29	14	2	
41	Clare Dawson	Ireland	56.32	12	6	NR
42	Jolien Sysmans	Belgium	56.33	14	8	
43	Petra Klosova	Czech Republic	56.34	13	3	
44	Natthanan Junkrajang	Thailand	56.42	13	2	
45	Henriette Brekke	Norway	56.47	12	4	
46	Cecilie Johannessen	Norway	56.50	11	5	
47	Katarina Listopadova	Slovakia	56.54	12	2	
48	Nicole Horn	Zimbabwe	56.57	12	9	
49	Eszter Dara	Hungary	56.65	14	0	
50	Nadia Colovini	Argentina	56.66	14	5	
51	Nina Van Koeckhoven	Belgium	56.69	13	4	
51	Nina Sovinek	Slovenia	56.69	14	9	
53	Loren Yamile Bahamonde	Ecuador	56.73	12	8	
54	Juanita Barreto Barreto	Colombia	56.75	10	3	
55	Nina Drolc	Slovenia	56.76	11	4	
56	Elina Partoka	Estonia	56.77	9	8	
57	Verena Klocker	Austria	56.79	12	5	
58	Emilia Pikkarainen	Finland	56.94	13	0	
59	Amanda Lim	Singapore	56.95	13	5	
60	Fiona Doyle	Ireland	56.96	12	3	
61	Kiera Aitken	Bermuda	56.99	10	5	NR
62	Rugile Mileisyte	Lithuania	57.30	11	1	
63	Christine Mailliet	Luxembourg	57.35	11	2	
64	Sherry Tsai	Hong Kong	57.53	12	0	
65	Pamela Benitez	El Salvador	57.54	11	9	
66	Annika Saarnak	Estonia	57.58	11	8	
67	Hang Yu Sze	Hong Kong	57.61	10	0	
68	Ximena Vilar	Venezuela	57.66	10	9	
69	Natasha Moodie	Jamaica	57.71	11	7	
70	Nicole Marmol	Ecuador	57.93	11	6	
71	Anna-Liza Mopio-Jane	Papua New Guinea	57.97	9	6	NR
72	Coral del Mar Lopez Rosario	Puerto Rico	57.98	9	4	
73	Kimberley Eeson	Zimbabwe	58.06	8	5	
74	Sharntelle McLean	Trinidad and Tobago	58.31	10	1	
75	Teisha Lightbourne	Bahamas	58.47	8	2	
76	Erika Stewart	Colombia	58.48	10	7	
77	Fella Bennaceur	Algeria	58.49	11	0	
78	Kristina Tchernychev	Israel	58.53	1	1	
79	Chinyere Pigot	Suriname	58.57	9	7	NR
80	Leung Chii Lin	Malaysia	58.64	10	8	
81	Grite Apanaviciute	Lithuania	58.70	12	1	
82	Marie Laura Meza	Costa Rica	58.88	8	4	
83	Maida Turnadzic	Bosnia and Herzegovina	58.91	12	7	
84	Marianela Quesada	Costa Rica	59.25	7	4	
85	Ashley Bransford	Aruba	59.27	9	1	
86	Karen Milenka Torrez Guzman	Bolivia	59.42	8	3	
87	Farida Osman	Egypt	59.45	10	2	
88	Amina Meho	Lebanon	59.60	9	3	
89	Clelia Tini	San Marino	59.62	8	1	
90	Shaila Millum Garðarnar	Faroe Islands	59.63	8	8	NR
91	Miriam Hatamleh	Jordan	59.84	7	6	
92	Nishani Cicilson	Suriname	59.94	6	8	
93	Sara Abdullahu	Albania	1:00.14	7	1	NR
94	Raffaella Rodoni Palma	Chile	1:00.31	9	0	
95	Baean Jouma	Syria	1:00.47	7	5	
95	Chittaranjan Shubha	India	1:00.47	7	7	
97	Daniela Miyahara Coello	Peru	1:00.63	7	3	
97	Sharon Paola Fajardo Sierra	Honduras	1:00.63	8	6	
99	Noelyn Faussane	French Polynesia	1:00.70	6	4	
100	Talasha Prabhu	India	1:00.73	7	9	
101	Jonay Briedenhann	Namibia	1:00.75	6	2	
102	Christine Briedenhann	Namibia	1:00.78	6	3	
103	Natalya Filina	Azerbaijan	1:00.84	7	8	
104	Melinda Sue Micallef	Malta	1:00.99	7	2	
104	Razan Taha	Jordan	1:00.99	8	9	
106	Talisa Pace	Malta	1:01.01	8	0	
107	Nilshaira Isenia	Netherlands Antilles	1:01.12	7	0	
108	Ting Sheng-Yo	Chinese Taipei	1:01.29	9	2	
109	Shannon Austin	Seychelles	1:01.38	5	9	
110	Silvie Ketelaars	Netherlands Antilles	1:01.47	8	7	
111	Andrea Cedron	Peru	1:01.49	6	6	
112	Sylvia Brunlehner	Kenya	1:01.56	4	5	
113	Dalia Torrez	Nicaragua	1:01.68	6	7	
114	Monica Bernardo	Mozambique	1:01.71	5	0	
115	Ramond Sherazad	Morocco	1:02.02	9	9	
116	Tan Chi Yan	Macau	1:02.09	6	5	
117	Judith Ilan Meauri	Papua New Guinea	1:02.34	5	7	
118	Sophia Noel	Grenada	1:02.41	4	2	
119	Karla Toscano	Guatemala	1:02.68	5	6	
120	Anahit Barseghyan	Armenia	1:02.69	4	6	
121	Long Chi Wun	Macau	1:02.76	6	9	
122	Kathryn Millin	Eswatini	1:02.78	4	7	
123	Amanda Jia Xin Liew	Brunei	1:03.00	5	1	
124	Birita Debes	Faroe Islands	1:03.10	3	7	
125	Pina Ercolano	Kenya	1:03.26	5	8	
126	Angelique Trinquier	Monaco	1:03.32	5	3	
127	Li Chuen Cheong Estelle	Mauritius	1:03.45	3	4	
128	Ifiezibe Gagbe	Nigeria	1:03.48	3	6	
129	Rovena Marku	Albania	1:03.87	5	5	
130	Tin Hon Ko Adeline Mei-Li	Mauritius	1:03.91	6	1	
131	Ayesha Noel	Grenada	1:03.96	5	2	
132	Estellah Fils Rabetsara	Madagascar	1:04.06	5	4	
133	Ouleye Diallo	Senegal	1:04.07	6	0	
134	Mariana Zaballa	Bolivia	1:04.37	4	8	
135	Cheyenne Rova	Fiji	1:04.67	4	1	
136	Amelie Trinquier	Monaco	1:04.87	3	3	
137	Gessica Stagno	Mozambique	1:04.94	4	9	
138	Sameera Al Bitar	Bahrain	1:05.05	2	4	
139	Mareme Faye	Senegal	1:05.06	4	3	
140	Tieri Erasito	Fiji	1:05.26	3	2	
141	Yara Dowani	Palestine	1:06.02	3	1	
142	Julia Alves	Marshall Islands	1:06.13	2	6	
143	Mirella Alam	Lebanon	1:06.53	4	0	
144	Maria Grace Koh	Brunei	1:06.93	4	4	
145	Rachael Catherine Glenister	American Samoa	1:07.00	3	5	
146	Enkhjargal Khulan	Mongolia	1:07.07	3	8	
147	Noelle Anyika Smith	Guyana	1:07.11	3	9	
148	Julianne Kirchner	Marshall Islands	1:07.84	2	2	
149	Maria Gibbons	Palau	1:08.21	2	5	
150	Olivia Infield	Uganda	1:08.31	1	5	
151	Sabine Hazboun	Palestine	1:08.57	3	0	
152	Mahnoor Maqsood	Pakistan	1:08.92	2	3	
153	Katerina Izmailova	Tajikistan	1:09.80	2	9	
154	Osisang Chilton	Palau	1:10.45	2	7	
155	Rida Mitha	Pakistan	1:12.62	2	1	
156	Gouri Kotecha	Tanzania	1:13.14	1	7	
157	Shreya Dhital	Nepal	1:15.58	1	4	
158	Shaila Rana	Nepal	1:15.84	2	0	
159	Ismail Aminath Inas	Maldives	1:18.25	1	2	
160	Jennet Saryyeva	Turkmenistan	1:18.63	1	6	
161	Irankunda Lena Courageuse	Burundi	1:18.73	1	3	
–	Maroua Mathlouthi	Tunisia	DNS	9	5	
–	Dina Hegazy	Egypt	DNS	10	4	
–	Pang Jiaying	China	DNS	15	2	
–	Marleen Veldhuis	Netherlands	DNS	15	4	
–	Federica Pellegrini	Italy	DNS	16	5	

=== Semifinals ===
Rank	Name	Nationality	Time	Heat	Lane	Notes
1	Libby Trickett	Australia	52.84	1	4	
2	Britta Steffen	Germany	52.87	1	5	
3	Amanda Weir	United States	53.02	2	4	AM
4	Francesca Halsall	Great Britain	53.05	1	6	
5	Ranomi Kromowidjojo	Netherlands	53.31	2	5	
6	Jeanette Ottesen	Denmark	53.41	1	3	NR
7	Dana Vollmer	United States	53.55	2	3	
8	Evelyn Verrasztó	Hungary	53.74	1	2	NR
9	Daniela Schreiber	Germany	53.76	2	7	
10	Hanna-Maria Seppälä	Finland	53.82	2	2	
11	Hayley Palmer	New Zealand	53.91	2	1	NR
12	Malia Metella	France	53.95	2	6	
13	Li Zhesi	China	53.97	1	7	
14	Marieke Guehrer	Australia	54.21	1	8	
15	Victoria Poon	Canada	54.29	1	1	
16	Aleksandra Gerasimenya	Belarus	54.51	2	8	

=== Final ===
Rank	Name	Nationality	Time	Lane	Notes
1st place, gold medalist(s)	Britta Steffen	Germany	52.07	5	WR
2nd place, silver medalist(s)	Francesca Halsall	Great Britain	52.87	6	NR
3rd place, bronze medalist(s)	Libby Trickett	Australia	52.93	4	
4	Amanda Weir	United States	53.12	3	
5	Dana Vollmer	United States	53.30	1	
6	Ranomi Kromowidjojo	Netherlands	53.37	2	
7	Jeanette Ottesen	Denmark	53.70	7	
8	Evelyn Verrasztó	Hungary	53.92	8	
