= Swimming at the 2009 World Aquatics Championships – Women's 50 metre freestyle =

Women's 50 metre freestyle at the 2009 FINA World Championships
- Venue: Foro Italico
- Dates: 1 August 2009 (heats, semifinals); 2 August 2009 (final)
- Competitors: 176
- Winning time: 23.73 WR

Medalists
gold medal	Britta Steffen	Germany
silver medal	Therese Alshammar	Sweden
bronze medal	Cate Campbell	Australia
bronze medal	Marleen Veldhuis	Netherlands

The heats for the women's 50 m freestyle race at the 2009 World Championships took place on the morning of 1 August and the final took place in the evening session of 2 August at the Foro Italico in Rome, Italy.

== Records ==
World record	Marleen Veldhuis (NED)	23.96	Amsterdam, Netherlands	19 April 2009
Championship record	Inge de Bruijn (NED)	24.45	Fukuoka, Japan	28 July 2001

The following records were established during the competition:

Date	Round	Name	Nationality	Time	Record
1 August	Heat 17	Cate Campbell	Australia	24.24	CR
1 August	Semifinal 1	Marleen Veldhuis	Netherlands	24.20	CR
1 August	Semifinal 2	Cate Campbell	Australia	24.08	CR
2 August	Final	Britta Steffen	Germany	23.73	WR

== Results ==
=== Heats ===
Rank	Name	Nationality	Time	Heat	Lane	Notes
1	Cate Campbell	Australia	24.24	17	5	CR
2	Therese Alshammar	Sweden	24.30	18	5	
3	Amanda Weir	United States	24.36	18	6	
4	Marleen Veldhuis	Netherlands	24.41	18	4	
5	Britta Steffen	Germany	24.42	18	3	
6	Francesca Halsall	Great Britain	24.47	17	3	NR
7	Dara Torres	United States	24.67	17	4	
8	Jeanette Ottesen	Denmark	24.72	16	6	NR
9	Libby Trickett	Australia	24.74	16	4	
10	Hinkelien Schreuder	Netherlands	24.78	16	5	
11	Aleksandra Gerasimenya	Belarus	24.85	17	6	
12	Malia Metella	France	25.01	16	3	
13	Arlene Semeco	Venezuela	25.11	17	2	
14	Victoria Poon	Canada	25.15	18	7	
15	Hanna-Maria Seppälä	Finland	25.17	17	7	
16	Sviatlana Khakhlova	Belarus	25.19	16	7	
17	Miroslava Najdanovski	Serbia	25.21	15	6	NR
18	Josefin Lillhage	Sweden	25.23	17	8	
19	Dar'ya Stepanyuk	Ukraine	25.32	18	1	
20	Triin Aljand	Estonia	25.33	18	8	
21	Xu Yanwei	China	25.41	16	8	
22	Anastasia Aksenova	Russia	25.46	17	1	
23	Misaki Yamaguchi	Japan	25.47	18	9	
24	Oksana Serikova	Ukraine	25.48	17	9	
25	Flávia Delaroli	Brazil	25.54	16	2	
26	Ragnheidur Ragnarsdottir	Iceland	25.55	15	3	
26	Arianna Vanderpool-Wallace	Bahamas	25.55	16	0	
28	Martina Moravcová	Slovakia	25.63	15	5	
29	Tatiana Barbosa	Brazil	25.64	15	4	
30	Liliana Ibanez	Mexico	25.70	15	1	NR
30	Amanda Lim	Singapore	25.70	15	9	
32	Katarzyna Wilk	Poland	25.71	18	0	
33	Gigliola Tecchio	Italy	25.74	15	7	
34	Vanessa García	Puerto Rico	25.78	15	0	
34	Jolien Sysmans	Belgium	25.78	17	0	
36	Henriette Brekke	Norway	25.81	14	4	
36	Emma Wilkins	Great Britain	25.81	16	9	
38	Sharntelle McLean	Trinidad and Tobago	25.92	14	8	
39	Cristina Chiuso	Italy	25.93	16	1	
40	Heather MacLean	Canada	25.94	13	8	
41	Natasha Moodie	Jamaica	25.95	15	8	=NR
42	Fabienne Nadarajah	Austria	25.97	14	5	
42	Lee Jae Young	South Korea	25.97	14	3	
44	Quah Ting Wen	Singapore	26.05	15	2	
45	Petra Klosova	Czech Republic	26.06	13	5	
46	Cecilie Johannessen	Norway	26.09	12	3	
47	Clare Dawson	Ireland	26.20	12	4	
47	Yamile Bahamonde	Ecuador	26.20	13	9	
49	Nina Drolc	Slovenia	26.22	14	2	
50	Riia-Rosa Koskelainen	Finland	26.24	13	1	
51	Annelies De Mare	Belgium	26.27	13	3	
52	Nina Sovinek	Slovenia	26.30	14	1	
52	Nadia Colovini	Argentina	26.30	14	9	NR
54	Yayoi Matsumoto	Japan	26.36	14	6	
55	Fiona Doyle	Ireland	26.38	13	2	
55	Natthanan Junkrajang	Thailand	26.38	13	7	
57	Nicole Horn	Zimbabwe	26.39	12	2	
58	Grite Apanaviciute	Lithuania	26.43	13	4	
59	Katarina Listopadova	Slovakia	26.46	13	0	
60	Rugile Mileisyte	Lithuania	26.48	14	0	
61	Ximena Vilar	Venezuela	26.52	11	5	
62	Tsai Hiu Wai Sherry	Hong Kong	26.56	13	6	
63	Aneta Pechancova	Czech Republic	26.58	12	7	
64	Fella Bennaceur	Algeria	26.64	11	4	
65	Erika Stewart	Colombia	26.72	7	6	
66	Farida Osman	Egypt	26.77	11	3	
67	Kiera Aitken	Bermuda	26.83	11	9	NR
68	Anna-Liza Mopio-Jane	Papua New Guinea	26.84	12	5	
69	Chinyere Pigot	Suriname	26.88	11	8	NR
70	Teisha Lightbourne	Bahamas	26.97	11	2	
71	Sze Hang Yu	Hong Kong	26.98	12	1	
72	Kimberley Eeson	Zimbabwe	27.07	11	1	
73	Pamela Benitez	El Salvador	27.13	11	6	
73	Leung Chii Lin	Malaysia	27.13	12	8	
75	Christine Mailliet	Luxembourg	27.18	10	2	
76	Ashley Bransford	Aruba	27.20	10	6	
76	Coral del Mar Lopez Rosario	Puerto Rico	27.20	12	0	
78	Nishani Cicilson	Suriname	27.22	9	5	
79	Juanita Barreto Barreto	Colombia	27.31	12	9	
80	Marie Laura Meza	Costa Rica	27.33	9	8	
81	Dalia Torrez	Nicaragua	27.36	9	4	
82	Amina Meho	Lebanon	27.37	14	7	
83	Diana Chang	Ecuador	27.40	10	1	
84	Marianela Quesada	Costa Rica	27.43	9	3	
84	Yulduz Kuchkarova	Uzbekistan	27.43	10	7	
86	Silvie Ketelaars	Netherlands Antilles	27.45	10	5	
87	Clelia Tini	San Marino	27.49	11	0	
88	Shaila Millum Gardarnar	Faroe Islands	27.50	10	3	
89	Monica Bernardo	Mozambique	27.75	7	9	
89	Sharon Paola Fajardo Sierra	Honduras	27.75	10	4	
91	Razan Taha	Jordan	27.81	9	6	
92	Birita Debes	Faroe Islands	27.93	4	7	
93	Natalya Filina	Azerbaijan	27.94	11	7	
94	Sylvia Brunlehner	Kenya	27.95	8	8	
95	Ma Cheok Mei	Macau	27.97	10	9	
96	Ting Sheng-Yo	Chinese Taipei	27.99	9	9	
97	Baean Jouma	Syria	28.04	8	7	
97	Chittaranjan Shubha	India	28.04	9	7	
97	Talisa Pace	Malta	28.04	10	0	
100	Miriam Hatamleh	Jordan	28.10	9	2	
101	Karen Milenka Torrez Guzman	Bolivia	28.11	9	1	
102	Ouleye Diallo	Senegal	28.15	8	9	
103	Amanda Jia Xin Liew	Brunei	28.23	6	8	
104	Melinda Sue Micallef	Malta	28.28	8	5	
105	Tan Chi Yan	Macau	28.30	8	6	
106	Nilshaira Isenia	Netherlands Antilles	28.32	8	4	
107	Khadidiatou Dieng	Senegal	28.39	6	6	
107	Chen Ting	Chinese Taipei	28.39	8	0	
109	Judith Ilan Meauri	Papua New Guinea	28.49	6	7	
110	Talasha Prabhu	India	28.53	8	1	
111	Kathryn Millin	Eswatini	28.55	7	2	
112	Noelyn Faussane	French Polynesia	28.57	7	4	
113	Siona Huxley	Saint Lucia	28.59	7	5	
114	Cheyenne Rova	Fiji	28.60	6	4	
115	Adele Rova	Fiji	28.66	5	5	
116	Sophia Noel	Grenada	28.68	8	3	
116	Shannon Austin	Seychelles	28.68	9	0	
118	Christine Briedenhann	Namibia	28.71	7	3	
119	Graciela Peinado Ibanez	Bolivia	28.98	6	5	
120	Pina Ercolano	Kenya	29.02	6	1	
121	Ifiezibe Gagbe	Nigeria	29.03	5	3	
122	Anahit Barseghyan	Armenia	29.12	6	3	
123	Rovena Marku	Albania	29.13	8	2	
124	Amelie Trinquier	Monaco	29.31	4	9	
125	Angelique Trinquier	Monaco	29.41	6	2	
126	Gessica Stagno	Mozambique	29.45	3	3	
127	Yara Dowani	Palestine	29.68	5	7	
128	Sameera Al Bitar	Bahrain	29.75	4	5	
129	Li Chuen Cheong Estelle	Mauritius	29.77	5	1	
130	Tin Hon Ko Adeline Mei-Li	Mauritius	29.89	7	0	
131	Olivia Infield	Uganda	29.95	2	5	
132	Kaluarachchilage Don	Sri Lanka	29.97	4	0	
133	Estellah Fils Rabetsara	Madagascar	29.99	7	8	
134	Noelle Anyika Smith	Guyana	30.00	3	4	
135	Ayesha Noel	Grenada	30.01	6	9	
136	Kiran Khan	Pakistan	30.06	4	4	
137	Maria Grace Koh	Brunei	30.17	5	8	
137	Mirella Alam	Lebanon	30.17	7	1	
139	Doli Akhter	Bangladesh	30.19	4	6	
140	Rachael Catherine Glenister	American Samoa	30.20	5	9	
141	Danielle Bernadine Findlay	Zambia	30.40	4	2	
142	Maria Gibbons	Palau	30.41	4	8	
143	Sabine Hazboun	Palestine	30.62	5	0	
144	Miniruwani Samarakoon	Sri Lanka	30.68	4	1	
145	Vitiny Hemthon	Cambodia	30.95	3	8	
146	Jamila Lunkuse	Uganda	30.98	2	6	
147	Reni Jani	Albania	31.09	5	2	
148	Debra Daniel	Federated States of Micronesia	31.12	2	7	
149	Oyungerel Gantumur	Mongolia	31.15	7	7	
150	Julianne Kirchner	Marshall Islands	31.22	4	3	
151	Katerina Izmailova	Tajikistan	31.31	5	6	
152	Enkhjargal Khulan	Mongolia	31.46	3	5	
153	Khurelbaatar Sainzaya	Mongolia	31.47	6	0	
154	Mariam Foum	Tanzania	31.65	3	1	
155	Melissa Peacock	Marshall Islands	32.12	3	9	
156	Rida Mitha	Pakistan	32.28	3	6	
157	Rayleen David	Federated States of Micronesia	32.96	2	1	
158	Jennet Saryyeva	Turkmenistan	33.02	2	8	
159	Shreya Dhital	Nepal	33.37	2	3	
160	Antja Flowers	Palau	33.74	2	4	
161	Shaila Rana	Nepal	33.83	2	2	
162	Elisabeth Nikiema	Burkina Faso	34.07	1	2	
163	Irankunda Lena Courageuse	Burundi	34.30	2	9	
164	Angele Gbenou Mahutin	Benin	35.04	1	1	
165	Elsie Uwamahoro	Burundi	36.56	2	0	
166	Awa Keita	Mali	37.07	1	6	
167	Aicha Oumar Coulibaly	Mali	37.47	1	3	
168	Svetlana Dogadkina	Tajikistan	39.04	3	0	
169	Ishita Hitendra Tanna	Tanzania	43.53	1	7	
–	Mukanya Ntumba Clarisse	Democratic Republic of the Congo	DNS	1	5	
–	Djene Barry	Guinea	DNS	3	7	
–	Maroua Mathlouthi	Tunisia	DNS	10	8	
–	Li Zhesi	China	DNS	18	2	
–	Yanet Gebremedhin	Ethiopia	DSQ	1	4	
–	Stephanie Rasoamanana	Madagascar	DSQ	5	4	
–	Cherelle Thompson	Trinidad and Tobago	DSQ	12	6	

=== Semifinals ===
Rank	Name	Nationality	Time	Heat	Lane	Notes
1	Cate Campbell	Australia	24.08	2	4	CR
2	Marleen Veldhuis	Netherlands	24.20	1	5	
3	Britta Steffen	Germany	24.28	2	3	
4	Amanda Weir	United States	24.31	2	5	
5	Therese Alshammar	Sweden	24.32	1	4	
6	Libby Trickett	Australia	24.34	2	2	
7	Francesca Halsall	Great Britain	24.42	1	3	NR
8	Dara Torres	United States	24.43	2	6	
9	Malia Metella	France	24.58	1	7	NR
10	Jeanette Ottesen	Denmark	24.62	1	6	NR
11	Sviatlana Khakhlova	Belarus	24.69	1	8	
12	Aleksandra Gerasimenya	Belarus	24.69	2	7	
13	Victoria Poon	Canada	24.75	1	1	NR
14	Arlene Semeco	Venezuela	24.76	2	1	SA
15	Hinkelien Schreuder	Netherlands	24.85	1	2	
16	Hanna-Maria Seppälä	Finland	25.09	2	8	

=== Final ===
Rank	Name	Nationality	Time	Lane	Notes
1st place, gold medalist(s)	Britta Steffen	Germany	23.73	3	WR
2nd place, silver medalist(s)	Therese Alshammar	Sweden	23.88	2	NR
3rd place, bronze medalist(s)	Cate Campbell	Australia	23.99	4	
3rd place, bronze medalist(s)	Marleen Veldhuis	Netherlands	23.99	5	
5	Francesca Halsall	Great Britain	24.11	1	NR
6	Libby Trickett	Australia	24.19	7	
7	Amanda Weir	United States	24.23	6	
8	Dara Torres	United States	24.48	8	
