= Swimming at the 2009 World Aquatics Championships – Women's 50 metre backstroke =

The heats for the women's 50 m backstroke race at the 2009 World Championships took place in the morning and evening of 29 July, with the final in the evening session of 30 July at the Foro Italico in Rome, Italy.

== Records ==
Prior to this competition, the existing world and competition records were as follows:

World record	Daniela Samulski (GER)	27.61	Berlin, Germany	26 June 2009
Championship record	Leila Vaziri (USA)	28.16	Melbourne, Australia	28 March 2007
Championship record	Leila Vaziri (USA)	28.16	Melbourne, Australia	29 March 2007

The following records were established during the competition:

Date	Round	Name	Nationality	Time	Record
28 July	Final*	Anastasia Zuyeva	Russia	28.13	CR
29 July	Heat 12	Zhao Jing	China	27.85	CR
29 July	Heat 13	Aleksandra Gerasimenya	Belarus	27.65	CR
29 July	Semifinal 1	Daniela Samulski	Germany	27.39	WR
29 July	Semifinal 2	Anastasia Zuyeva	Russia	27.38	WR
30 July	Final	Zhao Jing	China	27.06	WR

* Split from the women's 100 m backstroke

== Results ==
=== Heats ===
Rank	Name	Nationality	Time	Heat	Lane	Notes
1	Aleksandra Gerasimenya	Belarus	27.65	13	2	CR
2	Daniela Samulski	Germany	27.70	13	4	
2	Anastasia Zuyeva	Russia	27.70	14	4	
4	Sophie Edington	Australia	27.82	14	3	
5	Zhao Jing	China	27.85	12	4	
6	Hayley McGregory	USA	27.88	12	5	
7	Fabíola Molina	Brazil	27.94	14	2	SA
8	Aya Terakawa	Japan	27.95	13	5	
9	Gao Chang	China	28.02	14	5	
10	Gemma Spofforth	Great Britain	28.19	12	3	
11	Hinkelien Schreuder	Netherlands	28.23	12	6	
12	Emily Seebohm	Australia	28.25	13	6	
13	Elena Gemo	Italy	28.27	12	7	NR
14	Sanja Jovanović	Croatia	28.28	12	2	
15	Shiho Sakai	Japan	28.31	13	3	
16	Mercedes Peris	Spain	28.51	14	6	
17	Ingvild Snildal	Norway	28.55	12	9	NR
18	Fabienne Nadarajah	Austria	28.72	14	8	NR
19	Elizabeth Simmonds	Great Britain	28.78	13	7	
20	Maria Gromova	Russia	28.80	13	8	
21	Etiene Medeiros	Brazil	28.82	14	7	
22	Elizabeth Pelton	USA	28.86	11	6	
23	Yekaterina Rudenko	Kazakhstan	29.01	14	1	
24	Klara Vaclavikova	Czech Republic	29.05	14	9	
25	Alicja Tchorz	Poland	29.07	12	8	
26	Pernille Jessing Larsen	Denmark	29.08	11	2	
27	Marica Strazmester	Serbia	29.09	11	5	
27	Ranomi Kromowidjojo	Netherlands	29.09	13	1	
29	Martina Moravcová	Slovakia	29.12	11	4	
29	Laura Letrari	Italy	29.12	12	1	
31	Fernanda González	Mexico	29.13	10	3	NR
32	Iryna Amshennikova	Ukraine	29.14	11	8	
33	Simona Baumrtova	Czech Republic	29.19	14	0	
34	Hanna-Maria Seppälä	Finland	29.20	10	5	
34	Lim Shana Jia Yi	Singapore	29.20	11	7	=NR
36	Magdalena Kuras	Sweden	29.26	10	6	
36	Katharina Stiberg	Norway	29.26	11	1	
38	Tao Li	Singapore	29.28	8	4	
39	Sinead Russell	Canada	29.45	11	3	
40	Anastasiya Prilepa	Kazakhstan	29.49	9	0	
41	Ivana Gabrilo	Switzerland	29.51	11	9	
41	Daryna Zevina	Ukraine	29.51	13	9	
43	Kiera Aitken	Bermuda	29.55	10	8	NR
44	Carolina Colorado Henao	Colombia	29.57	10	4	
45	Rugilė Mileišytė	Lithuania	29.58	7	0	NR
46	Aisling Cooney	Ireland	29.69	10	9	
47	Riia-Rosa Koskelainen	Finland	29.70	11	0	
48	Aleksandra Kovaleva	Belarus	29.73	10	0	
49	Tsai Hiu Wai Sherry	Hong Kong	29.74	13	0	
50	Jeserick Pinto	Venezuela	29.77	9	2	
51	Katarina Milly	Slovakia	29.83	9	3	
51	Alana Dillette	Bahamas	29.83	9	9	NR
53	Gabrielle Soucisse	Canada	29.84	12	0	
54	Maja Sovinek	Slovenia	29.90	9	5	
55	Ekaterina Avramova	Bulgaria	29.91	10	1	
56	Juanita Barreto Barreto	Colombia	29.92	9	6	
57	Klaudia Nazieblo	Poland	29.93	10	2	
58	Sarah Rolko	Luxembourg	30.02	9	4	
59	Dana Gales	Luxembourg	30.22	8	3	
60	Lau Yin Yan Claudia	Hong Kong	30.26	10	7	
61	Dina Hegazy	Egypt	30.29	8	1	
62	Amit Ivry	Israel	30.32	9	8	
63	Siona Huxley	Saint Lucia	30.39	7	2	NR
64	Kätlin Sepp	Estonia	30.42	8	6	
65	Gizem Cam	Turkey	30.48	9	7	
66	Anna-Liisa Põld	Estonia	30.49	2	1	
67	Yulduz Kuchkarova	Uzbekistan	30.52	8	5	
68	Anna Volchkov	Israel	30.59	7	9	
69	Chen Ting	Chinese Taipei	30.63	9	1	
70	Maria Virginia Baez Franco	Paraguay	30.88	7	6	
71	Mónica Ramírez	Andorra	30.92	7	3	
72	Diana Chang	Ecuador	30.95	8	2	
73	Nicole Horn	Zimbabwe	30.98	5	8	
74	Anna-Liza Mopio-Jane	Papua New Guinea	31.08	7	4	
75	Elimar Barrios	Venezuela	31.11	8	7	
76	Silvie Ketelaars	Netherlands Antilles	31.18	8	8	
77	Nishani Cicilson	Suriname	31.30	6	4	NR
78	Kendese Nangle	Jamaica	31.53	8	0	
79	Amina Meho	Lebanon	31.56	7	1	
80	Chinyere Pigot	Suriname	31.84	3	4	
81	Dalia Torrez	Nicaragua	32.04	6	2	
82	Nicol Cremona	Malta	32.05	7	7	
83	Sylvia Brunlehner	Kenya	32.06	5	4	
83	ariha Zaman	India	32.06	7	5	
85	Rachita Shah	Kenya	32.15	4	2	
86	Karla Toscano	Guatemala	32.16	6	7	
87	Kirsten Lapham	Zimbabwe	32.19	6	9	
88	Khadidiatou Dieng	Senegal	32.20	5	5	
89	Birita Debes	Faroe Islands	32.27	6	0	
90	Long Chi Wun	Macau	32.33	6	6	
91	Karen Vilorio	Honduras	32.34	6	5	
92	Jonay Briedenhann	Namibia	32.36	6	8	
93	Anahit Barseghyan	Armenia	32.47	7	8	
94	Cheyenne Rova	Fiji	32.57	5	6	
95	Rebecca Sharpe	Bermuda	32.69	8	9	
96	Jade Ashleigh Howard	Zambia	32.92	4	5	
97	Sophia Noel	Grenada	32.95	5	9	
98	Che Lok In	Macau	33.03	5	1	
99	Angelique Trinquier	Monaco	33.04	4	4	
100	Mareme Faye	Senegal	33.07	5	2	
101	Sara Abdullahu	Albania	33.10	2	4	NR
102	Kiran Khan	Pakistan	33.39	6	3	
103	Adele Rova	Fiji	33.41	5	3	
104	Jessika Cossa	Mozambique	33.73	4	8	
105	Ana Euceda Gutierrez	Honduras	33.75	5	7	
106	Faina Salate	Mozambique	33.80	3	6	
107	Ruth Carvalho	Angola	33.96	6	1	
108	Shannon Austin	Seychelles	34.01	4	0	
109	Kathryn Millin	Eswatini	34.22	3	2	
110	Stephanie Rasoamanana	Madagascar	34.23	4	3	
111	Danielle Bernadine Findlay	Zambia	34.67	4	7	
112	Amnahliyani Mohamad Husain	Brunei	34.83	3	3	
113	Rachael Glenister	American Samoa	34.89	3	8	
114	Estellah Fils Rabetsara	Madagascar	35.00	5	0	
115	Judith Ilan Meauri	Papua New Guinea	35.02	3	7	
116	Debra Daniel	(Federated States of Micronesia) Micronesia	35.20	4	1	
117	Maria Grace Koh	Brunei	35.25	4	6	
118	Sabine Hazboun	Palestine	35.79	4	9	
119	Sausan Aishath	Maldives	35.87	2	7	
120	Reni Jani	Albania	35.99	2	5	
121	Osisang Chilton	Palau	36.32	1	5	
122	Rida Mitha	Pakistan	36.34	3	5	
123	Ifiezibe Gagbe	Nigeria	36.57	3	1	
124	Amelie Trinquier	Monaco	36.60	3	0	
125	Olivia Infield	Uganda	36.61	2	2	
125	Seng Sam Phors	Cambodia	36.61	2	8	
127	Melissa Peacock	Marshall Islands	36.83	3	9	
128	Gouri Kotecha	Tanzania	37.07	1	3	
129	Shaila Rana	Nepal	37.29	2	3	
130	Clarissa Brady	Marshall Islands	37.64	2	6	
131	Mariam Foum	Tanzania	38.25	1	4	
132	Yanet Gebremedhin	Ethiopia	40.80	2	0	
–	Khurelbaatar Sainzaya	Mongolia	DSQ	1	6	

=== Semifinals ===
Rank	Name	Nationality	Time	Heat	Lane	Notes
1	Anastasia Zuyeva	Russia	27.38	2	5	WR
2	Daniela Samulski	Germany	27.39	1	4	NR
3	Sophie Edington	Australia	27.51	1	5	OC
4	Aleksandra Gerasimenya	Belarus	27.57	2	4	
5	Zhao Jing	China	27.59	2	3	AS
6	Gao Chang	China	27.66	2	2	
7	Emily Seebohm	Australia	27.70	1	7	
7	Fabíola Molina	Brazil	27.70	2	6	AM
9	Aya Terakawa	Japan	27.73	1	6	NR
10	Hinkelien Schreuder	Netherlands	27.77	2	7	NR
11	Hayley McGregory	United States	27.83	1	3	
12	Shiho Sakai	Japan	27.88	2	8	
13	Gemma Spofforth	Great Britain	27.92	1	2	NR
14	Sanja Jovanović	Croatia	28.19	1	1	
15	Mercedes Peris	Spain	28.28	1	8	
16	Elena Gemo	Italy	28.32	2	1	

=== Final ===
Rank	Name	Nationality	Time	Lane	Notes
1st place, gold medalist(s)	Zhao Jing	China	27.06	2	WR
2nd place, silver medalist(s)	Daniela Samulski	Germany	27.23	5	ER
3rd place, bronze medalist(s)	Gao Chang	China	27.28	7	
4	Anastasia Zuyeva	Russia	27.31	4	NR
5	Aleksandra Gerasimenya	Belarus	27.62	6	
6	Sophie Edington	Australia	27.73	3	
7	Emily Seebohm	Australia	27.83	1	
8	Fabíola Molina	Brazil	27.88	8	

== See also ==
- Swimming at the 2007 World Aquatics Championships – Women's 50 metre backstroke
