= List of German records in swimming =

Below is a complete list of the German records in swimming, which are ratified by the German Swimming Federation (DSV).

== Long course (50 m) ==
=== Men ===
Event	Time		Name	Club	Date	Meet	Location	Ref
50 m freestyle	21.81	h	Damian Wierling	SG Essen	8 May 2016	German Championships	Berlin, Germany	
100 m freestyle	47.80		Josha Salchow	Germany	31 July 2024	Olympic Games	Paris, France	
200 m freestyle	1:42.00	WR	Paul Biedermann	Germany	28 July 2009	World Championships	Rome, Italy	
400 m freestyle	3:39.96	WR	Lukas Märtens	Germany	12 April 2025	Swim Open Stockholm	Stockholm, Sweden	
800 m freestyle	7:37.59	ER	Johannes Liebmann	Germany	12 August 2026	European Championships	Paris, France	
1500 m freestyle	14:26.79	WR	Johannes Liebmann	Germany	15 August 2026	European Championships	Paris, France	
50m backstroke	24.57		Ole Braunschweig	SG Neukölln Berlin	21 April 2023	Berlin Swim Open	Berlin, Germany	
100m backstroke	52.27	r	Helge Meeuw	Germany	2 August 2009	World Championships	Rome, Italy	
200m backstroke	1:55.85		Lukas Märtens	Germany	17 April 2026	Bergen Swim Festival	Bergen, Norway	
50m breaststroke	26.57		Melvin Imoudu	Potsdamer SV	25 April 2026	German Championships	Berlin, Germany	
100m breaststroke	58.74	h	Lucas Matzerath	Germany	23 July 2023	World Championships	Fukuoka, Japan	
200m breaststroke	2:07.47		Marco Koch	Germany	21 August 2014	European Championships	Berlin, Germany	
50m butterfly	22.71	sf	Luca Armbruster	Germany	10 August 2026	European Championships	Paris, France	
100m butterfly	50.92		Kaii Winkler	NC State University	18 June 2026	USA Swimming Pro Swim Series	Indianapolis, United States	
200m butterfly	1:55.04		David Thomasberger	SSG Leipzig e.V	3 April 2021	Olympic Qualifying Meet	Heidelberg, Germany	
200m individual medley	1:55.76		Philip Heintz	SV Nikar Heidelberg	16 June 2017	German Championships	Berlin, Germany	
400m individual medley	4:11.52	h	Cedric Büssing	Germany	28 July 2024	Olympic Games	Paris, France	
4×100m freestyle relay	3:12.29		Josha Salchow (48.28); Rafael Miroslaw (47.66); Luca Armbruster (48.43); Peter Varjási (47.92)	Germany	27 July 2024	Olympic Games	Paris, France	
4×200m freestyle relay	7:02.28		Lukas Märtens (1:45.71); Timo Sorgius (1:45.63); Jarno Baschnitt (1:45.10); Cornelius Jahn (1:45.84)	Germany	10 August 2026	European Championships	Paris, France	
4×100m medley relay	3:28.58		Helge Meeuw (52.27); Hendrik Feldwehr (58.51); Benjamin Starke (50.91); Paul Biedermann (46.89)	Germany	2 August 2009	World Championships	Rome, Italy	

Legend: # – Record awaiting ratification by DSV; WR – World record; ER – European record; e – equalled existing record;
Records not set in finals: h – heat; sf – semifinal; r – relay 1st leg; rh – relay heat 1st leg; b – B final; † – en route to final mark; so – swim-off; tt – time trial

=== Women ===
Event	Time		Name	Club	Date	Meet	Location	Ref
50m freestyle	23.73		Britta Steffen	Germany	2 August 2009	World Championships	Rome, Italy	
100m freestyle	52.07		Britta Steffen	Germany	31 July 2009	World Championships	Rome, Italy	
200m freestyle	1:55.68		Annika Lurz	Germany	28 March 2007	World Championships	Melbourne, Australia	
400m freestyle	4:02.14		Isabel Gose	Germany	27 July 2024	Olympic Games	Paris, France	
800m freestyle	8:16.43		Sarah Köhler	Germany	27 July 2019	World Championships	Gwangju, South Korea	
1500m freestyle	15:41.16		Isabel Gose	Germany	31 July 2024	Olympic Games	Paris, France	
50m backstroke	27.23		Daniela Samulski	Germany	30 July 2009	World Championships	Rome, Italy	
100m backstroke	59.77	sf	Daniela Samulski	Germany	27 July 2009	World Championships	Rome, Italy	
200m backstroke	2:07.63		Lisa Graf	SG Neukölln Berlin	18 June 2017	German Championships	Berlin, Germany	
50m breaststroke	30.10		Anna Elendt	Germany	26 May 2022	Mare Nostrum	Barcelona, Spain	
100m breaststroke	1:05.19		Anna Elendt	Germany	29 July 2025	World Championships	Singapore, Singapore	
200m breaststroke	2:23.54		Anna Elendt	SG Frankfurt	4 May 2025	German Championships	Berlin, Germany	
50m butterfly	25.50		Angelina Köhler	Germany	2 August 2025	World Championships	Singapore, Singapore	
100m butterfly	56.11	sf	Angelina Köhler	Germany	11 February 2024	World Championships	Doha, Qatar	
200m butterfly	2:05.26		Franziska Hentke	SC Magdeburg	3 July 2015	German Open	Essen, Germany	
200m individual medley	2:11.33		Alexandra Wenk	SG Stadtwerke München	7 May 2016	German Championships	Berlin, Germany	
400m individual medley	4:36.10		Petra Schneider	East Germany	1 August 1982	World Championships	Guayaquil, Ecuador	
4×100m freestyle relay	3:31.83		Britta Steffen (52.22); Daniela Samulski (53.49); Petra Dallmann (53.75); Daniela Schreiber (52.37)	Germany	26 July 2009	World Championships	Rome, Italy	
4×200m freestyle relay	7:49.14		Maya Tobehn (1:58.47); Linda Roth (1:56.33); Nina Holt (1:57.60); Nicole Maier (1:56.74)	Germany	10 August 2026	European Championships	Paris, France	
4×100m medley relay	3:55.79		Daniela Samulski (59.85); Sarah Poewe (1:06.81); Annika Mehlhorn (57.14); Britta Steffen (51.99)	Germany	1 August 2009	World Championships	Rome, Italy	

Legend: # – Record awaiting ratification by DSV; WR – World record; ER – European record; e – equalled existing record;
Records not set in finals: h – heat; sf – semifinal; r – relay 1st leg; rh – relay heat 1st leg; b – B final; † – en route to final mark; so – swim-off; tt – time trial

=== Mixed relay ===
Event	Time		Name	Club	Date	Meet	Location	Ref
4×100 m freestyle relay	3:24.87	h	Josha Salchow (48.32); Rafael Miroslaw (48.48); Nina Holt (53.62); Nina Jazy (54.45)	Germany	2 August 2025	World Championships	Singapore, Singapore	
4×200 m freestyle relay	7:25.43		Lukas Märtens (1:46.73); Jarno Baschnitt (1:45.87); Linda Roth (1:57.18); Maya Tobehn (1:55.65)	Germany	15 August 2026	European Championships	Paris, France	
4×100 m medley relay	3:43.00		Kaii Winkler (53.64); Melvin Imoudu (59.12); Angelina Köhler (56.55); Nina Holt (53.69)	Germany	11 August 2026	European Championships	Paris, France	

Legend: # – Record awaiting ratification by DSV; WR – World record; ER – European record; e – equalled existing record;
Records not set in finals: h – heat; so – swim-off

== Short Course (25 m) ==
=== Men ===
Event	Time		Name	Club	Date	Meet	Location	Ref
50m freestyle	20.73		Steffen Deibler	Germany	15 November 2009	World Cup	Berlin, Germany	
100m freestyle	45.91		Steffen Deibler	Hamburger SC von 1879	25 October 2009	International Meet	Aachen, Germany	
200m freestyle	1:39.37	ER	Paul Biedermann	Germany	15 November 2009	World Cup	Berlin, Germany	
400m freestyle	3:32.77		Paul Biedermann	Germany	14 November 2009	World Cup	Berlin, Germany	
800m freestyle	7:27.99		Florian Wellbrock	Germany	7 November 2021	European Championships	Kazan, Russia	
1500m freestyle	14:06.88	WR	Florian Wellbrock	Germany	21 December 2021	World Championships	Abu Dhabi, United Arab Emirates	
50m backstroke	22.76		Christian Diener	London Roar	18 October 2020	International Swimming League	Budapest, Hungary	
100m backstroke	49.65	r	Christian Diener	London Roar	20 November 2021	International Swimming League	Eindhoven, Netherlands	
200m backstroke	1:48.97		Christian Diener	Germany	21 December 2021	World Championships	Abu Dhabi, United Arab Emirates	
50m breaststroke	25.87	sf	Fabian Schwingenschlögl	Germany	15 December 2018	World Championships	Hangzhou, China	
100m breaststroke	56.16		Fabian Schwingenschlögl	Germany	28 October 2021	World Cup	Kazan, Russia	
200m breaststroke	2:00.44		Marco Koch	DSW 1912 Darmstadt	20 November 2016	German Championships	Berlin, Germany	
50m butterfly	21.80		Steffen Deibler	Germany	14 November 2009	World Cup	Berlin, Germany	
100m butterfly	49.06		Marius Kusch	Germany	5 December 2019	European Championships	Glasgow, Great Britain	
200m butterfly	1:51.21		Thomas Rupprath	SG Bayer Wuppertal/ Uerdingen/Dormagen	1 December 2001	German Championships	Rostock, Germany	
100m individual medley	50.66		Markus Deibler	Germany	7 December 2014	World Championships	Doha, Qatar	
200m individual medley	1:51.92		Philip Heintz	Germany	31 August 2016	World Cup	Berlin, Germany	
400m individual medley	4:01.87		Marco Koch	DSW 1912 Darmstadt	19 November 2015	German Championships	Wuppertal, Germany	
4×50m freestyle relay	1:24.31		Marco di Carli (21.58); Johannes Dietrich (20.75); Stefan Herbst (21.07); Christoph Fildebrandt (20.91)	Germany	13 December 2009	European Championships	Istanbul, Turkey	
4×100m freestyle relay	3:09.89	h	Marco Di Carli (47.81); Markus Deibler (46.86); Philip Heintz (47.90); Steffen Deibler (47.32)	Germany	3 December 2014	World Championships	Doha, Qatar	
4×200m freestyle relay	6:50.43		Rafael Miroslaw (1:41.25); Kaii Winkler (1:42.32); Timo Sorgius (1:41.87); Florian Wellbrock (1:44.99)	Germany	13 December 2024	World Championships	Budapest, Hungary	
4×50m medley relay	1:31.79		Ole Braunschweig (23.09); Lucas Matzerath (25.87); Marius Kusch (21.72); Josha Salchow (21.11)	Germany	17 December 2022	World Championships	Melbourne, Australia	
4×100m medley relay	3:22.17		Christian Diener (50.01); Marco Koch (56.68); Marius Kusch (48.91); Damian Wierling (46.57)	Germany	16 December 2018	World Championships	Hangzhou, China	

Legend: # – Record awaiting ratification by DSV; WR – World record; ER – European record; e – equalled existing record;
Records not set in finals: h – heat; sf – semifinal; r – relay 1st leg; rh – relay heat 1st leg; b – B final; † – en route to final mark; so – swim-off; tt – time trial

=== Women ===
Event	Time		Name	Club	Date	Meet	Location	Ref
50m freestyle	23.74		Dorothea Brandt	Germany	13 December 2009	European Championships	Istanbul, Turkey	
100m freestyle	51.76		Britta Steffen	SG Neukölln	22 November 2009	German Team Championships	Hannover, Germany	
200m freestyle	1:53.48		Annika Bruhn	Germany	7 December 2019	European Championships	Glasgow, Great Britain	
400m freestyle	3:54.33	ER	Isabel Gose	Germany	2 December 2025	European Championships	Lublin, Poland	
800m freestyle	8:01.90		Isabel Gose	Germany	5 December 2025	European Championships	Lublin, Poland	
1500m freestyle	15:18.01	ER	Sarah Köhler	SG Frankfurt	16 November 2019	German Championships	Berlin, Germany	
50m backstroke	26.21		Daniela Samulski	Germany	14 November 2009	World Cup	Berlin, Germany	
100m backstroke	56.60	sf	Nina Holt	Germany	4 December 2025	European Championships	Lublin, Poland	
200m backstroke	2:03.00		Jenny Mensing	SC Wiesbaden 1911	6 December 2009	German Team Championships	Wuppertal, Germany	
50m breaststroke	29.30		Anna Elendt	Germany	18 December 2022	World Championships	Melbourne, Australia	
100m breaststroke	1:03.83		Anna Elendt	Germany	11 October 2025	World Cup	Carmel, United States	
200m breaststroke	2:17.80		Anna Elendt	Germany	10 October 2025	World Cup	Carmel, United States	
50m butterfly	25.06	sf	Angelina Köhler	Germany	2 December 2025	European Championships	Lublin, Poland	
100m butterfly	55.50		Angelina Köhler	Germany	9 December 2023	European Championships	Otopeni, Romania	
200m butterfly	2:03.01		Franziska Hentke	Germany	4 December 2015	European Championships	Netanya, Israel	
100m individual medley	58.57		Angelina Köhler	SG Neukölln e.V. Berlin	15 November 2026	German Championships	Wuppertal, Germany	
200m individual medley	2:07.65		Theresa Michalak	Germany	14 November 2009	World Cup	Berlin, Germany	
400m individual medley	4:29.46		Nicole Hetzer	Germany	16 December 2001	European Championships	Antwerp, Belgium	
4×50m freestyle relay	1:35.69	h	Angelina Köhler (24.02); Nina Jazy (24.19); Nina Holt (23.40); Julianna Bocska (24.08)	Germany	2 December 2025	European Championships	Lublin, Poland	
4×100m freestyle relay	3:30.37	h	Nina Jazy (52.93); Nicole Maier (53.19); Nina Holt (52.07); Nele Schulze (52.18)	Germany	10 December 2024	World Championships	Budapest, Hungary	
4×200m freestyle relay	7:41.65	h	Isabel Gose (1:55.89); Julia Mrozinski (1:55.78); Nicole Maier (1:55.76); Nele Schulze (1:54.22)	Germany	12 December 2024	World Championships	Budapest, Hungary	
4×50m medley relay	1:44.71		Nina Holt (26.72); Anna Elendt (29.39); Angelina Köhler (24.80); Nina Jazy (23.80)	Germany	7 December 2025	European Championships	Lublin, Poland	
4×100m medley relay	3:54.15		Laura Riedemann (58.04); Jessica Steiger (1:05.08); Aliena Schmidtke (57.41); Annika Bruhn (52.90)	Germany	16 December 2018	World Championships	Hangzhou, China	

Legend: # – Record awaiting ratification by DSV; WR – World record; ER – European record; e – equalled existing record;
Records not set in finals: h – heat; sf – semifinal; r – relay 1st leg; rh – relay heat 1st leg; b – B final; † – en route to final mark; so – swim-off; tt – time trial

=== Mixed relay ===
Event	Time	Name	Club	Date	Meet	Location	Ref
4×50m freestyle relay	1:30.55	Steffen Deibler (21.74); Marco Di Carli (21.11); Dorothea Brandt (23.58); Daniela Schreiber (24.12)	Germany	6 December 2014	World Championships	Doha, Qatar	
4×50m medley relay	1:37.83	Christian Diener (22.94); Fabian Schwingenschlögl (25.31); Aliena Schmidtke (25.22); Jessica Steiger (24.36)	Germany	14 December 2017	European Championships	Copenhagen, Denmark	

Legend: # – Record awaiting ratification by DSV; e – equalled existing record;
Records not set in finals: h – heat; so – swim-off
