= Swimming at the 2009 World Aquatics Championships – Women's 100 metre backstroke =

The heats for the Women's 100 m Backstroke race at the 2009 World Championships took place in the morning and evening of 27 July and the final took place in the evening session of 28 July at the Foro Italico in Rome, Italy.

== Records ==
Prior to this competition, the existing world and competition records were as follows:

World record	Kirsty Coventry (ZIM)	58.77	Beijing, China	11 August 2008
Championship record	Natalie Coughlin (USA)	59.44	Melbourne, Australia	27 March 2007

The following records were established during the competition:

Date	Round	Name	Nationality	Time	Record
27 July	Heat 11	Gemma Spofforth	(United Kingdom) Great Britain	58.78	CR
27 July	Semifinal 1	Anastasia Zuyeva	Russia	58.48	WR
28 July	Final	Gemma Spofforth	(United Kingdom) Great Britain	58.12	WR

== Heats ==
Rank	Name	Nationality	Time	Heat	Lane	Notes
1	Gemma Spofforth	Great Britain	58.78	11	4	CR, ER
2	Anastasia Zuyeva	Russia	59.01	12	5	NR
3	Kirsty Coventry	Zimbabwe	59.51	12	4	
4	Emily Seebohm	Australia	59.64	11	5	
5	Shiho Sakai	Japan	59.80	10	5	
6	Gao Chang	China	59.84	11	7	
7	Hayley McGregory	United States	59.91	10	4	
8	Elizabeth Simmonds	Great Britain	1:00.04	10	6	
9	Aya Terakawa	Japan	1:00.18	11	3	
10	Maria Gromova	Russia	1:00.32	11	8	
11	Daniela Samulski	Germany	1:00.34	12	2	
12	Elizabeth Pelton	United States	1:00.47	12	7	
13	Fabíola Molina	Brazil	1:00.53	10	2	SA
14	Pernille Jessing Larsen	Denmark	1:00.67	12	8	
15	Zhao Jing	China	1:00.79	12	3	
16	Alexianne Castel	France	1:00.80	11	6	
17	Belinda Hocking	Australia	1:00.90	10	3	
18	Fernanda González	Mexico	1:00.94	9	5	NR
19	Eszter Dara	Hungary	1:01.10	11	2	
19	Elena Gemo	Italy	1:01.10	11	1	
21	Valentina De Nardi	Italy	1:01.46	10	0	
22	Esther Baron	France	1:01.48	12	6	
23	Sanja Jovanović	Croatia	1:01.53	10	7	
24	Sinead Russell	Canada	1:01.63	12	1	
25	Alicja Tchorz	Poland	1:01.75	12	0	
26	Simona Baumrtova	Czech Republic	1:01.79	12	9	
27	Petra Klosova	Czech Republic	1:01.83	8	4	
28	Carolina Colorado Henao	Colombia	1:01.85	10	1	
29	Iryna Amshennikova	Ukraine	1:02.00	11	0	
30	Gabrielle Soucisse	Canada	1:02.14	10	8	
31	Kseniya Grygorenko	Ukraine	1:02.36	9	4	
32	Kimberly Buys	Belgium	1:02.46	9	1	NR
33	Aisling Cooney	Ireland	1:02.55	9	8	
34	Anastasiya Prilepa	Kazakhstan	1:02.72	7	7	
35	Klaudia Nazieblo	Poland	1:02.74	11	9	
36	Melanie Nocher	Ireland	1:02.76	8	7	
37	Marica Strazmester	Serbia	1:02.90	9	0	
38	Sarah Rolko	Luxembourg	1:02.97	8	1	
39	Kiera Aitken	Bermuda	1:02.99	9	7	
40	Dina Hegazy	Egypt	1:03.03	8	3	NR
41	Aleksandra Kovaleva	Belarus	1:03.17	8	2	
42	Yekaterina Rudenko	Kazakhstan	1:03.29	8	5	
43	Martina van Berkel	Switzerland	1:03.44	8	6	
44	Ekaterina Avramova	Bulgaria	1:03.47	9	2	
45	Jeserick Pinto	Venezuela	1:03.48	7	5	NR
46	Lau Yin Yan Claudia	Hong Kong	1:03.51	7	3	
47	Katarina Milly	Slovakia	1:03.57	6	3	
48	Maja Sovinek	Slovenia	1:03.66	7	6	
49	Tsai Hiu Wai Sherry	Hong Kong	1:03.69	10	9	
50	Lim Shana Jia Yi	Singapore	1:03.72	8	8	
51	Ramirez Monica	Andorra	1:03.79	5	4	
52	Elodie Vanhamme	Belgium	1:04.01	9	9	
53	Alana Dillette	Bahamas	1:04.09	9	6	
54	Dana Gales	Luxembourg	1:04.12	8	0	
55	Anna-Liisa Põld	Estonia	1:04.14	6	7	
56	Lourdes Villaseñor	Mexico	1:04.22	6	5	
57	Erika Stewart	Colombia	1:04.55	7	9	
58	Kätlin Sepp	Estonia	1:04.79	7	1	
59	Riia-Rosa Koskelainen	Finland	1:04.89	7	8	
60	Kang Yeong-Seo	South Korea	1:05.19	8	9	
61	Diana Chang	Ecuador	1:05.33	6	9	
62	Yulduz Kuchkarova	Uzbekistan	1:05.34	7	0	
63	Lynette Ng	Singapore	1:05.65	6	1	
63	Chen Ting	Chinese Taipei	1:05.65	7	4	
65	Nicole Marmol	Ecuador	1:05.77	6	4	
66	Maria Virginia Baez Franco	Paraguay	1:05.81	7	2	
67	Elimar Barrios	Venezuela	1:06.14	6	2	
68	Amina Meho	Lebanon	1:06.80	6	8	NR
69	Nishani Cicilson	Suriname	1:07.34	4	3	
70	Siona Huxley	Saint Lucia	1:07.55	4	1	NR
71	Gizem Çam	Turkey	1:07.62	1	6	
72	Karla Toscano	Guatemala	1:07.76	5	3	
73	Karen Milenka Torrez Guzman	Bolivia	1:07.90	5	5	NR
74	Kirsten Lapham	Zimbabwe	1:07.95	5	8	
75	Silvie Ketelaars	Netherlands Antilles	1:08.09	5	2	
76	Rebecca Sharpe	Bermuda	1:08.31	6	0	
77	Kendese Nangle	Jamaica	1:08.37	5	7	
78	Karen Vilorio	Honduras	1:08.84	4	2	
79	Jonay Briedenhann	Namibia	1:08.88	5	6	
80	Nicol Cremona	Malta	1:09.10	5	1	
81	Rachita Shah	Kenya	1:09.32	3	1	
82	Fong Man Wai	Macau	1:09.53	4	5	
83	Fariha Zaman	India	1:10.12	5	0	
84	Che Lok In	Macau	1:10.20	5	9	
85	Laura Lucia Paz Chavez	Honduras	1:10.25	4	8	
86	Birita Debes	Faroe Islands	1:10.30	3	5	
87	Angelique Trinquier	Monaco	1:10.58	3	6	
88	Mariana Zaballa	Bolivia	1:11.10	4	0	
89	Sophia Noel	Grenada	1:11.40	4	9	
90	Sylvia Brunlehner	Kenya	1:11.60	3	2	
91	Jade Ashleigh Howard	Zambia	1:11.86	2	5	
92	Dalia Torrez	Nicaragua	1:12.99	4	6	
93	Jessika Cossa	Mozambique	1:13.10	2	3	
94	Mareme Faye	Senegal	1:13.23	3	7	
95	Kiran Khan	Pakistan	1:13.37	4	4	
96	Ruth Carvalho	Angola	1:13.52	3	4	
97	Cheyenne Rova	Fiji	1:13.53	3	9	
98	Rachael Catherine Glenister	American Samoa	1:13.74	3	0	
99	Faina Salate	Mozambique	1:14.77	2	7	
100	Estellah Fils Rabetsara	Madagascar	1:14.81	3	3	
101	Khadidiatou Dieng	Senegal	1:14.91	3	8	
102	Amelie Trinquier	Monaco	1:16.10	2	2	
103	Maria Grace Koh	Brunei	1:17.73	2	4	
104	Judith Ilan Meauri	Papua New Guinea	1:18.09	2	6	
105	Amnahliyani Mohamed Husain	Brunei	1:19.60	2	9	
106	Reni Jani	Albania	1:19.95	1	4	
107	Sausan Aishath	Maldives	1:20.65	1	5	
108	Rida Mitha	Pakistan	1:21.22	2	8	
109	Gouri Kotecha	Tanzania	1:23.64	1	3	
110	Shaila Rana	Nepal	1:23.81	2	0	
111	Ifiezibe Gagbe	Nigeria	1:24.96	2	1	
112	Daoheuang Inthavong	Laos	1:30.02	1	7	
113	Thepaksone Chinfavong	Laos	1:42.58	1	2	
—	Magdalena Kuras	Sweden	DNS	1	1	
—	Anahit Barseghyan	Armenia	DNS	4	7	
—	Ingvild Snildal	Norway	DNS	9	3	
—	Anna Volchkov	Israel	DSQ	6	6	

== Semifinals ==
Rank	Name	Nationality	Time	Heat	Lane	Notes
1	Anastasia Zuyeva	Russia	58.48	1	4	WR
2	Gemma Spofforth	Great Britain	58.74	2	4	NR
3	Emily Seebohm	Australia	59.15	1	5	OC
4	Kirsty Coventry	Zimbabwe	59.21	2	5	
5	Shiho Sakai	Japan	59.25	2	3	AS
6	Zhao Jing	China	59.39	2	8	NR
7	Elizabeth Simmonds	Great Britain	59.55	1	6	
7	Hayley McGregory	United States	59.55	2	6	
9	Daniela Samulski	Germany	59.77	2	7	NR
10	Gao Chang	China	1:00.21	1	3	
11	Aya Terakawa	Japan	1:00.31	2	2	
12	Maria Gromova	Russia	1:00.49	1	2	
13	Elizabeth Pelton	United States	1:00.51	1	7	
14	Fabíola Molina	Brazil	1:00.55	2	1	
15	Alexianne Castel	France	1:00.63	1	8	
16	Pernille Jessing Larsen	Denmark	1:00.67	1	1	

== Final ==
Rank	Name	Nationality	Time	Lane	Notes
1st place, gold medalist(s)	Gemma Spofforth	Great Britain	58.12	5	WR
2nd place, silver medalist(s)	Anastasia Zuyeva	Russia	58.18	4	NR
3rd place, bronze medalist(s)	Emily Seebohm	Australia	58.88	3	OC
4	Shiho Sakai	Japan	59.14	2	AS
5	Zhao Jing	China	59.28	7	NR
6	Hayley McGregory	United States	59.42	8	
7	Elizabeth Simmonds	Great Britain	59.71	1	
8	Kirsty Coventry	Zimbabwe	59.74	6	
