= Swimming at the 2010 Asian Games – Women's 100 metre freestyle =

Women's 100 metre freestyle at the 2010 Asian Games
- Venue: Aoti Aquatics Centre
- Date: 17 November 2010
- Competitors: 20 from 13 nations

Medalists
gold medal	Tang Yi	China
silver medal	Li Zhesi	China
bronze medal	Haruka Ueda	Japan

The women's 100 metre freestyle event at the 2010 Asian Games took place on 17 November 2010 at Guangzhou Aoti Aquatics Centre.

There were 20 competitors from 13 countries who took part in this event. Three heats were held, the heat in which a swimmer competed did not formally matter for advancement, as the swimmers with the top eight times from the entire field qualified for the finals.

Tang Yi and Li Zhesi from China won the gold and silver medal respectively, Japanese swimmer Haruka Ueda won the bronze medal.

== Schedule ==
All times are China Standard Time (UTC+08:00)

Date	Time	Event
Wednesday, 17 November 2010	09:00	Heats
Wednesday, 17 November 2010	18:00	Final

== Records ==
Prior to this competition, the existing world, Asian and Games records were as follows.

World Record	Britta Steffen (GER)	52.07	Rome, Italy	31 July 2009
Asian Record	Pang Jiaying (CHN)	53.13	Jinan, China	22 October 2009
Games Record	Shan Ying (CHN)	54.40	Hiroshima, Japan	3 October 1994

== Results ==
=== Heats ===
Rank	Heat	Athlete	Time	Notes
1	3	Tang Yi (CHN)	55.10	
2	1	Haruka Ueda (JPN)	55.47	
3	2	Hannah Wilson (HKG)	55.59	
4	3	Li Zhesi (CHN)	56.11	
5	2	Yayoi Matsumoto (JPN)	56.33	
6	3	Lee Jae-young (KOR)	57.06	
7	1	Natthanan Junkrajang (THA)	57.21	
8	3	Natsaya Susuk (THA)	57.57	
9	3	Mylene Ong (SIN)	57.81	
10	1	Yu Wai Ting (HKG)	57.84	
11	1	Chui Lai Kwan (MAS)	57.98	
12	2	Jasmine Al-Khaldi (PHI)	58.01	
13	2	Kim Ga-eul (KOR)	58.34	
14	1	Quah Ting Wen (SIN)	58.55	
15	2	Leung Chii Lin (MAS)	58.92	
16	3	Bayan Jumah (SYR)	1:01.79	
17	2	Tan Chi Yan (MAC)	1:03.21	
18	1	Madhavi Kaushalya (SRI)	1:05.18	
19	3	Gantömöriin Oyuungerel (MGL)	1:11.99	
20	2	Jennet Saryýewa (TKM)	1:14.97	

=== Final ===
Rank	Athlete	Time	Notes
1st place, gold medalist(s)	Tang Yi (CHN)	54.12	GR
2nd place, silver medalist(s)	Li Zhesi (CHN)	54.84	
3rd place, bronze medalist(s)	Haruka Ueda (JPN)	55.15	
4	Hannah Wilson (HKG)	55.33	
5	Yayoi Matsumoto (JPN)	55.78	
6	Lee Jae-young (KOR)	56.81	
7	Natthanan Junkrajang (THA)	57.14	
8	Natsaya Susuk (THA)	57.27	
