= 2010 FINA World Swimming Championships (25 m) – Women's 100 metre freestyle =

Women's 100m Freestyle at the 2010 Short Course Worlds
- Dates: 16 December 2010 (heats and semifinals); 17 December 2010 (final)
- Winning time: 51.45

Medalists
gold medal	Ranomi Kromowidjojo	Netherlands
silver medal	Femke Heemskerk	Netherlands
bronze medal	Natalie Coughlin	United States

The Women's 100 metre Freestyle at the 10th Short Course World Swimming Championships took place 16–17 December 2010 in Dubai, United Arab Emirates. The heats and semifinals were 16 December; the final was 17 December.

89 swimmers participated in the event

== Records ==
Prior to the competition, the existing world and championship records were as follows.

	Name	Nation	Time	Location	Date
World record	Libby Trickett	Australia	51.01	Hobart	10 August 2009
Championship record	Marleen Veldhuis; Therese Alshammar	Netherlands; Sweden	52.17	Manchester; Athens	11 April 2008; 16 April 2000

The following records were established during the competition:

Date	Round	Name	Nation	Time	WR	CR
17 December 2010	Final	Ranomi Kromowidjojo	Netherlands	51.44		CR

== Results ==
=== Heats ===
Rank	Heat	Lane	Name	Time	Notes
1	11	2	Natalie Coughlin (USA)	52.27	Q
2	12	4	Ranomi Kromowidjojo (NED)	52.39	Q
3	11	5	Dana Vollmer (USA)	52.58	Q
4	10	4	Femke Heemskerk (NED)	52.62	Q
5	12	6	Arianna Vanderpool-Wallace (BAH)	52.85	Q
6	12	2	Victoria Poon (CAN)	53.14	Q
7	10	6	Marieke Guehrer (AUS)	53.23	Q
8	11	4	Jeanette Ottesen (DEN)	53.31	Q*
9	12	3	Camille Muffat (FRA)	53.32	Q
10	11	6	Li Zhesi (CHN)	53.33	Q
11	10	5	Daniela Schreiber (GER)	53.50	Q
12	12	5	Sarah Sjöström (SWE)	53.53	Q
13	11	3	Emma McKeon (AUS)	53.59	Q
14	12	7	Silke Lippok (GER)	53.85	Q
15	9	6	Genevieve Saumur (CAN)	53.89	Q
16	10	1	Margarita Nesterova (RUS)	53.94	Q
17	11	4	Hanna-Maria Seppälä (FIN)	53.97	*
18	8	4	Pang Jiaying (CHN)	54.17	*
19	10	2	Tatiana Lemos (BRA)	54.24	
20	9	3	Theodora Drakou (GRE)	54.26	
21	9	4	Ragnheiður Ragnarsdóttir (ISL)	54.44	
22	11	8	Flávia Delaroli (BRA)	54.62	
23	8	3	Pernille Blume (DEN)	54.65	
24	11	1	Chiara Masini Luccetti (ITA)	54.84	
25	11	7	Veronika Popova (RUS)	54.90	
26	9	5	Nina Rangelova (BUL)	54.95	
27	10	8	Cecilie Waage Johannessen (NOR)	55.03	
28	9	7	Leone Vorster (RSA)	55.08	
29	9	8	Burcu Dolunay (TUR)	55.15	
30	12	1	Gabriella Fagundez (SWE)	55.20	
31	9	2	Renata Fabiola Spagnolo (ITA)	55.32	
32	10	7	Katarina Filova (SVK)	55.41	
33	8	5	María Fernanda González Ramirez (MEX)	55.51	
34	8	1	Nicole Horn (ZIM)	55.56	
35	12	8	Ophélie Cyrielle Etienne (FRA)	55.64	
36	9	1	Henriette Brekke (NOR)	56.31	
37	8	2	Carmen Cianci (COL)	56.43	
38	8	7	Miroslava Syllabova (SVK)	56.70	
39	7	4	Ximena Vilar (VEN)	57.23	
39	7	5	Ranohon Amanova (UZB)	57.23	
41	7	2	Farida Osman (EGY)	57.34	
42	8	8	Kirsten Ann Lapham (ZIM)	57.52	
43	8	6	Sarah Rolko (LUX)	57.62	
44	6	7	Cherelle Thompson (TRI)	57.77	
45	6	2	Karen Torrez (BOL)	58.47	NR
46	7	8	Nicola Muscat (MLT)	58.85	
47	7	3	Christine Magdalene Briedenhann (NAM)	58.88	
48	7	7	Talasha Satish Prabhu (IND)	59.09	
49	5	5	Marie Laura Meza (CRC)	59.12	
50	6	8	Talita Baqlah (JOR)	59.31	
51	6	5	Jade Howard (ZAM)	59.39	
52	6	3	Bayan Jumah (SYR)	59.60	
52	6	6	Oriele Alejandra Espinoza (PER)	59.60	
54	6	4	Talisa Pace (MLT)	59.62	
55	5	4	Olivia Planteau de Maroussem (MRI)	59.94	
56	7	6	Sara Hyajna (JOR)	1:00.18	
57	4	5	Zonia Caravantes (GUA)	1:00.35	
58	7	1	Shannon Austin (SEY)	1:00.39	
59	5	3	Micaela Cloete (NAM)	1:00.43	
60	5	6	Lou Wai Sam (MAC)	1:00.58	
61	6	1	Tan Chi Yan (MAC)	1:00.72	
62	4	6	Amanda Liew (BRU)	1:01.10	
63	5	8	Judith Ilan Meauri (PNG)	1:01.18	
64	5	2	Elaine Reyes (GIB)	1:01.19	
65	5	7	Emily Chan Chee (MRI)	1:01.24	
66	4	2	Tieri Erasito (FIJ)	1:02.01	
67	4	4	Pilar Shimizu (GUM)	1:02.37	
68	4	3	Britany van Lange (GUY)	1:02.56	
69	1	5	Cheyenne Rova (FIJ)	1:02.60	
70	5	1	Estellah Fils Rabetsara (MAD)	1:03.42	
71	3	5	Danielle Bernadine Findlay (ZAM)	1:04.21	
72	4	8	Diala Awad (PLE)	1:04.50	
73	4	7	Jenina Cruz (GUM)	1:05.44	
74	3	8	Magdalena Moshi (TAN)	1:05.77	
75	3	2	Mariam Foum (TAN)	1:06.15	
76	3	7	Grace Kimball (NMI)	1:06.72	
77	2	7	Celeste Brown (COK)	1:06.85	
78	4	1	Khulan Enkhjargal (MGL)	1:07.01	
79	3	6	Soraya Oruya (KEN)	1:07.02	
80	3	3	Ann-Marie Hepler (MHL)	1:07.11	
81	3	1	Osisang Chilton (PLW)	1:07.69	
82	2	4	Mahnoor Maqsood (PAK)	1:08.00	
83	3	4	Ledia Kacani (ALB)	1:08.11	
84	1	4	Kateryna Izmaylova (TJK)	1:09.75	
85	2	3	Jennet Saryyeva (TKM)	1:11.39	
86	1	3	Keanna Villagomez (NMI)	1:11.81	
87	2	6	Shajan Aminath (MDV)	1:13.11	
88	2	5	Shaila Rana (NEP)	1:14.62	
89	2	2	Chaemel Morgane Faosite Sogbadji (BEN)	1:39.24	

* Ottesen and Seppälä scratched semifinals; therefore Pang advanced on.

=== Semifinals ===
==== Semifinal 1 ====
Rank	Lane	Name	Time	Notes
1	5	Femke Heemskerk (NED)	52.27	Q
2	4	Ranomi Kromowidjojo (NED)	52.34	Q
3	3	Victoria Poon (CAN)	52.76	Q NR
4	6	Camille Muffat (FRA)	52.90	Q
5	7	Emma McKeon (AUS)	53.03	Q
6	2	Daniela Schreiber (GER)	53.33	
7	8	Pang Jiaying (CHN)	53.68	
8	1	Genevieve Saumur (CAN)	53.76	

==== Semifinal 2 ====
Rank	Lane	Name	Time	Notes
1	4	Natalie Coughlin (USA)	52.51	Q
2	5	Dana Vollmer (USA)	52.67	Q
3	6	Marieke Guehrer (AUS)	52.95	Q
4	3	Arianna Vanderpool-Wallace (BAH)	53.09	
5	2	Li Zhesi (CHN)	53.30	
6	1	Silke Lippok (GER)	53.49	
7	7	Sarah Sjöström (SWE)	53.60	
7	8	Margarita Nesterova (RUS)	53.60	

=== Final ===
Rank	Lane	Name	Time	Notes
1st place, gold medalist(s)	5	Ranomi Kromowidjojo (NED)	51.45	CR
2nd place, silver medalist(s)	4	Femke Heemskerk (NED)	52.18	
3rd place, bronze medalist(s)	3	Natalie Coughlin (USA)	52.25	
4	7	Camille Muffat (FRA)	52.41	
5	2	Victoria Poon (CAN)	52.51	NR
6	1	Marieke Guehrer (AUS)	52.81	
7	6	Dana Vollmer (USA)	52.95	
8	8	Emma McKeon (AUS)	53.10	
