= Swimming at the 2009 World Aquatics Championships – Women's 4 × 100 metre freestyle relay =

The women's 4×100 m freestyle relay at the 2009 World Aquatics Championships took place on July 26, 2009 at the Foro Italico in Rome, Italy.

== Records ==
Prior to the competition, the existing world and championship records were as follows:

| World Record | Netherlands (NED); Inge Dekker (53.77); Ranomi Kromowidjojo (53.61); Femke Heemskerk (53.62); Marleen Veldhuis (52.62) | 3:33.62 | Eindhoven, Netherlands | 18 March 2008 |
| Championship Record | Australia (AUS); Libby Lenton (53.42); Melanie Schlanger (53.95); Shayne Reese (54.90); Jodie Henry (53.21) | 3:35.48 | Melbourne, Australia | 25 March 2007 |

The following records were established during the competition:

| Date | Round | Nation | Time | Record |
|---|---|---|---|---|
| 26 July | Heat 2 | Australia; Sally Foster (54.18); Marieke Guehrer (53.47); Shayne Reese (53.19); Meagen Nay (54.42) | 3:35.26 | CR |
| 26 July | Heat 3 | Germany; Britta Steffen (53.76); Daniela Samulski (53.81); Petra Dallmann (53.69); Daniela Schreiber (53.48) | 3:34.74 | CR |
| 26 July | Final | Netherlands; Inge Dekker (53.61); Ranomi Kromowidjojo (52.30); Femke Heemskerk (53.03); Marleen Veldhuis (52.78) | 3:31.72 | WR |

== Results ==
=== Heats ===
| Rank | Heat | Lane | Nation | Swimmers | Time | Notes |
|---|---|---|---|---|---|---|
| 1 | 3 | 5 | Germany | Britta Steffen (53.76); Daniela Samulski (53.81); Petra Dallmann (53.69); Daniela Schreiber (53.48) | 3:34.74 | CR, NR |
| 2 | 4 | 4 | Netherlands | Femke Heemskerk (53.83); Hinkelien Schreuder (54.93); Inge Dekker (52.97); Ranomi Kromowidjojo (53.21) | 3:34.94 | |
| 3 | 2 | 4 | Australia | Sally Foster (54.18); Marieke Guehrer (53.47); Shayne Reese (53.19); Meagen Nay (54.42) | 3:35.26 | |
| 4 | 3 | 6 | Sweden | Therese Alshammar (54.27); Josefin Lillhage (53.55); Sarah Sjöström (53.14); Gabriella Fagundez (54.35) | 3:35.31 | NR |
| 5 | 4 | 5 | China | Li Zhesi (54.27); Zhu Qianwei (54.34); Tang Yi (54.03); Pang Jiaying (54.21) | 3:36.85 | |
| 6 | 4 | 3 | Great Britain | Fran Halsall (53.02) CR, NR; Caitlin McClatchey (54.98); Katherine Wyld (54.80); Amy Smith (54.22) | 3:37.02 | NR |
| 7 | 3 | 4 | United States | Julia Smit (54.25); Kate Dwelley (54.65); Caitlin Geary (54.59); Christine Magnuson (53.63) | 3:37.12 | |
| 8 | 3 | 2 | Hungary | Eszter Dara (55.29); Evelyn Verrasztó (53.90); Ágnes Mutina (54.28); Katinka Hosszú (54.17) | 3:37.64 | NR |
| 9 | 3 | 3 | Canada | Victoria Poon (54.70); Erica Morningstar (54.84); Geneviève Saumur (53.89); Heather MacLean (54.79) | 3:38.22 | NR |
| 10 | 2 | 5 | France | Aurore Mongel (54.77); Hanna Shcherba (54.66); Ophelie-Cyrielle Etienne (55.44); Malia Metella (53.79) | 3:38.66 | |
| 11 | 2 | 3 | Japan | Haruka Ueda (54.88) NR; Hanae Ito (55.00); Yayoi Matsumoto (54.98); Misaki Yamaguchi (54.03) | 3:38.89 | NR |
| 12 | 2 | 6 | Russia | Olga Klyuchnikova (54.88) NR; Victoriya Andreeva (54.79); Maria Ugolkova (55.56); Anastasia Aksenova (55.25) | 3:40.48 | NR |
| 13 | 4 | 6 | Italy | Renata Fabiola Spagnolo (55.68); Laura Letrari (54.68); Erica Buratto (55.19); Silvia Di Pietro (55.52) | 3:41.07 | |
| 14 | 3 | 7 | Belarus | Yulia Khitraya (56.59); Aleksandra Gerasimenya (53.75); Sviatlana Khakhlova (55.44); Iryna Niafedava (56.74) | 3:42.52 | |
| 15 | 4 | 1 | Finland | Linda Laihorinne (56.63); Emilia Pikkarainen (56.50); Riia-Rosa Koskelainen (56.02); Hanna-Maria Seppälä (53.83) | 3:42.98 | |
| 16 | 2 | 7 | Slovakia | Katarina Listopadova (57.14); Katarina Filova (55.27); Miroslava Syllabova (56.44); Martina Moravcová (54.78) | 3:43.63 | |
| 17 | 2 | 0 | Belgium | Nina Van Koeckhoven (56.67); Sascha Van den Branden (56.49); Annelies de Mare (56.12); Jolien Sysmans (55.37) | 3:44.65 | NR |
| 18 | 2 | 2 | Ireland | Fiona Doyle (56.57) NR; Clare Dawson (56.16); Niamh O'Sullivan (57.38); Melanie Nocher (57.10) | 3:47.21 | NR |
| 19 | 4 | 2 | Singapore | Quah Ting Wen (56.14); Amanda Lim (56.26); Mylene Ong (57.46); Lynette Lim (57.68) | 3:47.54 | |
| 20 | 3 | 1 | Bahamas | Alana Dillette (57.11); Arianna Vanderpool-Wallace (54.85); Teisha Lightbourne (58.52); Alicia Lightbourne (57.86) | 3:48.34 | NR |
| 21 | 4 | 7 | Venezuela | Arlene Semeco (55.98); Jeserick Pinto (57.83); Ximena Vilar (57.06); Yennifer Marquez (58.28) | 3:49.15 | NR |
| 22 | 1 | 5 | Ukraine | Dar'ya Stepanyuk (55.43); Oksana Serikova (56.38); Kseniya Grygorenko (59.82); Daryna Zevina (57.63) | 3:49.26 | |
| 23 | 2 | 1 | Lithuania | Rugile Mileisyte (56.94); Grite Apanaviciute (58.16); Raminta Dvariskyte (1:00.71); Aiste Dobrovolskaite (59.16) | 3:54.97 | NR |
| 24 | 4 | 9 | Malta | Nicol Cremona (1:02.14); Melinda Sue Micallef (59.71); Davina Mangion (1:00.80); Talisa Pace (1:00.34) | 4:02.99 | |
| 25 | 4 | 8 | Macau | Ma Cheok Mei (1:00.64); Tan Chi Yan (1:01.35); Fong Man Wai (1:01.07); Che Lok In (1:01.69) | 4:04.75 | |
| 26 | 3 | 8 | India | Chittaranjan Shubha (1:00.68); Murugaperumal Mercy Venpa (1:06.93); Pooja Raghava Alva (1:03.86); Talasha Prabhu (1:00.94) | 4:12.41 | |
| 27 | 2 | 8 | Senegal | Binta Zahra Diop (1:01.79); Ouleye Diallo (1:04.66); Mareme Faye (1:07.01); Khadidiatou Dieng (1:01.96) | 4:15.42 | NR |
| 28 | 1 | 4 | Mozambique | Monica Bernardo (1:03.18); Jessika Cossa (1:05.56); Faina Salate (1:04.04); Gessica Stagno (1:05.12) | 4:17.90 | |
| 29 | 4 | 0 | Albania | Sara Abdullahu (1:00.36); Reni Jani (1:09.79); Debora Keci (1:06.78); Rovena Marku (1:04.30) | 4:21.23 | |
| 30 | 3 | 0 | Pakistan | Kiran Khan (1:08.30); Aqsa Tariq (1:13.55); Rida Mitha (1:11.34); Mahnoor Moqsood (1:09.82) | 4:43.01 | |
| – | 1 | 3 | Zimbabwe | Moira Fraser (58.74); Kirsten Lapham; Kimberley Eeson; Nicole Horn | DSQ | |

=== Final ===
| Rank | Lane | Nation | Swimmers | Time | Note |
|---|---|---|---|---|---|
| 1st place, gold medalist(s) | 5 | Netherlands | Inge Dekker (53.61); Ranomi Kromowidjojo (52.30); Femke Heemskerk (53.03); Marleen Veldhuis (52.78) | 3:31.72 | WR |
| 2nd place, silver medalist(s) | 4 | Germany | Britta Steffen (52.22) WR; Daniela Samulski (53.49); Petra Dallmann (53.75); Daniela Schreiber (52.37) | 3:31.83 | NR |
| 3rd place, bronze medalist(s) | 3 | Australia | Lisbeth Trickett (52.62) OC; Marieke Guehrer (53.60); Shayne Reese (53.25); Felicity Galvez (53.54) | 3:33.01 | OC |
| 4 | 1 | United States | Amanda Weir (54.47); Dara Torres (53.72); Christine Magnuson (53.86); Dana Vollmer (53.18) | 3:35.23 | |
| 5 | 6 | Sweden | Therese Alshammar (53.58) NR; Josefin Lillhage (53.58); Sarah Sjöström (53.62); Gabriella Fagundez (54.57) | 3:35.35 | |
| 6 | 2 | China | Li Zhesi (54.04); Zhu Qianwei (53.73); Tang Yi (54.16); Pang Jiaying (53.70) | 3:35.63 | AS |
| 7 | 7 | Great Britain | Fran Halsall (53.31); Caitlin McClatchey (54.43); Katherine Wyld (54.74); Amy Smith (54.51) | 3:36.99 | NR |
| 8 | 8 | Hungary | Eszter Dara (55.09); Evelyn Verrasztó (54.20); Ágnes Mutina (54.74); Katinka Hosszú (55.50) | 3:39.53 | |
