= Swimming at the 2009 World Aquatics Championships =

The Swimming portion of the 13th FINA World Aquatics Championships was held at the Foro Italico sports complex in Rome, Italy from Sunday 26 July – Sunday 2 August 2009. It featured 40 long course (50 m) events (20 for males, 20 for females; 17 individual events and 3 relays for each gender).

== Competition schedule ==
The evening session schedule for the 2009 Worlds was:

Date	Sunday; July 26, 2009	Monday; July 27, 2009	Tuesday; July 28, 2009	Wednesday; July 29, 2009
E v e n t s	Women's 100 fly [sf] Men's 400 free Women's 200 IM [sf] Men's 50 fly [sf] Women's 400 free Men's 100 breast [sf] Women's 4 × 100 freestyle Men's 4 × 100 freestyle	Men's 100 breast Women's 100 fly Men's 100 back [sf] Women's 100 breast [sf] Men's 50 fly Women's 100 back [sf] Men's 200 free [sf] Women's 200 IM	Men's 200 free Women's 100 back Men's 50 breast [sf] Women's 1500 free Men's 100 back Women's 200 free [sf] Men's 200 fly [sf] Women's 100 breast	Men's 100 free [sf] Women's 50 back [sf] Men's 200 fly Women's 200 free Men's 50 breast Women's 200 fly [sf] Men's 200 IM [sf] Men's 800 free
Date	Thursday; July 30, 2009	Friday; July 31, 2009	Saturday; August 1, 2009	Sunday; August 2, 2009
E v e n t s	Women's 100 free [sf] Men's 200 IM; Women's 200 breast [sf] Men's 100 free Women's 200 fly Men's 200 breast [sf] Women's 50 back Men's 200 back [sf] Women's 4 × 200 freestyle	Women's 100 free Men's 200 back Women's 50 fly [sf] Men's 50 free [sf] Women's 200 breast Men's 100 fly [sf] Women's 200 back [sf] Men's 200 breast Men's 4 × 200 freestyle	Women's 50 fly Men's 50 free Women's 200 back Women's 50 breast [sf] Men's 100 fly Women's 50 free [sf] Men's 50 back [sf] Women's 800 free Women's 4 × 100 medley	Men's 50 back Women's 50 breast Men's 400 IM; Women's 50 free Men's 1500 free Women's 400 IM; Men's 4 × 100 medley

Note: prelims/semifinals/finals were swum in events 200 m and shorter; prelims/finals in events 400 m or longer. For prelims/semifinals/finals events, prelims and semis were held on the same day, with finals being the evening of the following day. For the 400 m events and the 800 m relays, prelims and finals were held the same day. For the individual 800 m and 1500 m races, prelims were in the morning of one day, with finals in the evening of the next day. Preliminary sessions began at 9:00 a.m.; finals at 6:00 p.m.

== Medal table ==
* Host nation (Italy)

Rank	Nation	Gold	Silver	Bronze	Total
1	United States (USA)	10	6	6	22
2	Germany (GER)	4	4	1	9
3	China (CHN)	4	2	4	10
4	Australia (AUS)	3	4	9	16
5	Italy (ITA)*	3	0	1	4
6	Great Britain (GBR)	2	3	2	7
7	Hungary (HUN)	2	1	3	6
8	Brazil (BRA)	2	1	0	3
8	Serbia (SRB)	2	1	0	3
10	Russia (RUS)	1	5	1	7
11	Japan (JPN)	1	2	1	4
12	Tunisia (TUN)	1	2	0	3
13	Denmark (DEN)	1	1	0	2
13	Sweden (SWE)	1	1	0	2
13	Zimbabwe (ZIM)	1	1	0	2
16	South Africa (RSA)	1	0	2	3
17	Netherlands (NED)	1	0	1	2
18	France (FRA)	0	3	3	6
19	Canada (CAN)	0	2	1	3
20	Poland (POL)	0	1	0	1
21	Spain (ESP)	0	0	3	3
22	Austria (AUT)	0	0	1	1
22	Lithuania (LTU)	0	0	1	1
22	Norway (NOR)	0	0	1	1
22	Romania (ROU)	0	0	1	1
Totals (25 entries)		40	40	42	122

== Medal winners ==
=== Men's events ===
Event	Gold		Silver		Bronze	
50 m freestyle	César Cielo Filho; Brazil	21.08; CR, AM	Frédérick Bousquet; France	21.21	Amaury Leveaux; France	21.25
100 m freestyle	César Cielo Filho; Brazil	46.91; WR	Alain Bernard; France	47.12; ER	Frédérick Bousquet; France	47.25
200 m freestyle	Paul Biedermann; Germany	1:42.00; WR	Michael Phelps; United States	1:43.22	Danila Izotov; Russia	1:43.90; NR
400 m freestyle	Paul Biedermann; Germany	3:40.07; WR	Oussama Mellouli; Tunisia	3:41.11; AF	Zhang Lin; China	3:41.35; AS
800 m freestyle	Zhang Lin; China	7:32.12; WR	Oussama Mellouli; Tunisia	7:35.27; AF	Ryan Cochrane; Canada	7:41.92; AM
1500 m freestyle	Oussama Mellouli; Tunisia	14:37.28; AF	Ryan Cochrane; Canada	14:41.38	Sun Yang; China	14:46.84
50 m backstroke	Liam Tancock; Great Britain	24.04; WR	Junya Koga; Japan	24.24; AS	Gerhard Zandberg; South Africa	24.34; AF
100 m backstroke	Junya Koga; Japan	52.26; CR, AS	Helge Meeuw; Germany	52.54	Aschwin Wildeboer; Spain	52.64
200 m backstroke	Aaron Peirsol; United States	1:51.92; WR	Ryosuke Irie; Japan	1:52.51; AS	Ryan Lochte; United States	1:53.82
50 m breaststroke	Cameron van der Burgh; South Africa	26.67; WR	Felipe França Silva; Brazil	26.76; AM	Mark Gangloff; United States	26.86; NR
100 m breaststroke	Brenton Rickard; Australia	58.58; WR	Hugues Duboscq; France	58.64; ER	Cameron van der Burgh; South Africa	58.95; AF
200 m breaststroke	Dániel Gyurta; Hungary	2:07.64; ER	Eric Shanteau; United States	2:07.65	Giedrius Titenis; Lithuania Christian Sprenger; Australia	2:07.80; NR 2:07.80
50 m butterfly	Milorad Čavić; Serbia	22.67; CR, NR	Matt Targett; Australia	22.73; OC	Rafael Muñoz; Spain	22.88
100 m butterfly	Michael Phelps; United States	49.82; WR	Milorad Čavić; Serbia	49.95; ER	Rafael Muñoz; Spain	50.41; NR
200 m butterfly	Michael Phelps; United States	1:51.51; WR	Paweł Korzeniowski; Poland	1:53.23; NR	Takeshi Matsuda; Japan	1:53.32
200 m individual medley	Ryan Lochte; United States	1:54.10; WR	László Cseh; Hungary	1:55.24	Eric Shanteau; United States	1:55.36
400 m individual medley	Ryan Lochte; United States	4:07.01	Tyler Clary; United States	4:07.31	László Cseh; Hungary	4:07.37
4 × 100 m freestyle relay	United States; Michael Phelps (47.78); Ryan Lochte (47.03); Matt Grevers (47.61); Nathan Adrian (46.79); Garrett Weber-Gale^{[a]} Ricky Berens^{[a]} Cullen Jones^{[a]}	3:09.21; CR	Russia; Evgeniy Lagunov (47.90); Andrey Grechin (47.00); Danila Izotov (47.23); Alexander Sukhorukov (47.39); Nikita Konovalov^{[a]}	3:09.52; NR	France; Fabien Gilot (47.73); Alain Bernard (46.46); Grégory Mallet (48.28); Frédérick Bousquet (47.42); Amaury Leveaux^{[a]} William Meynard^{[a]}	3:09.89
4 × 200 m freestyle relay	United States; Michael Phelps (1:44.49); Ricky Berens (1:44.13); David Walters (1:45.47); Ryan Lochte (1:44.46); Daniel Madwed^{[a]} Davis Tarwater^{[a]} Peter Vanderkaay^{[a]}	6:58.55; WR	Russia; Nikita Lobintsev (1:45.10); Mikhail Polischuk (1:45.42); Danila Izotov (1:44.48); Alexander Sukhorukov (1:44.15); Yevgeny Lagunov^{[a]} Sergei Perunin^{[a]}	6:59.15; ER	Australia; Kenrick Monk (1:46.00); Robert Hurley (1:46.47); Tommaso D'Orsogna (1:44.82); Patrick Murphy (1:44.36); Nick Ffrost^{[a]} Kirk Palmer^{[a]}	7:01.65; OC
4 × 100 m medley relay	United States; Aaron Peirsol (52.19) CR; Eric Shanteau (58.57); Michael Phelps (49.72); David Walters (46.80); Matt Grevers^{[a]} Mark Gangloff^{[a]} Tyler McGill^{[a]} Nathan Adrian^{[a]}	3:27.28; WR	Germany; Helge Meeuw (52.27) ER; Hendrik Feldwehr (58.51); Benjamin Starke (50.91); Paul Biedermann (46.89)	3:28.58; ER	Australia; Ashley Delaney (53.10); Brenton Rickard (57.80); Andrew Lauterstein (50.58); Matt Targett (47.16); Christian Sprenger^{[a]}	3:28.64; OC

Legend: AF African record | AM Americas record | AS Asian record | CR Championship record | ER European record | OC Oceania record | WR World record | NR National record
^{a} Swimmers who participated in the heats only and received medals.

=== Women's events ===
Event	Gold		Silver		Bronze	
50 m freestyle	Britta Steffen; Germany	23.73; WR	Therese Alshammar; Sweden	23.88; NR	Cate Campbell; Australia Marleen Veldhuis; Netherlands	23.99
100 m freestyle	Britta Steffen; Germany	52.07; WR	Francesca Halsall; Great Britain	52.87; NR	Libby Trickett; Australia	52.93
200 m freestyle	Federica Pellegrini; Italy	1:52.98; WR	Allison Schmitt; United States	1:54.96; AM	Dana Vollmer; United States	1:55.64
400 m freestyle	Federica Pellegrini; Italy	3:59.15; WR	Joanne Jackson; Great Britain	4:00.60; NR	Rebecca Adlington; Great Britain	4:00.79
800 m freestyle	Lotte Friis; Denmark	8:15.92; CR, NR	Joanne Jackson; Great Britain	8:16.66	Alessia Filippi; Italy	8:17.21; NR
1500 m freestyle	Alessia Filippi; Italy	15:44.93; CR, ER	Lotte Friis; Denmark	15:46.30; NR	Camelia Potec; Romania	15:55.63
50 m backstroke	Zhao Jing; China	27.06; WR	Daniela Samulski; Germany	27.23; ER	Gao Chang; China	27.28
100 m backstroke	Gemma Spofforth; Great Britain	58.12; WR	Anastasia Zueva; Russia	58.18; NR	Emily Seebohm; Australia	58.88; OC
200 m backstroke	Kirsty Coventry; Zimbabwe	2:04.81; WR	Anastasia Zueva; Russia	2:04.94; ER	Elizabeth Beisel; United States	2:06.39
50 m breaststroke	Yuliya Efimova; Russia	30.09; WR	Rebecca Soni; United States	30.11; AM	Sarah Katsoulis; Australia	30.16; OC
100 m breaststroke	Rebecca Soni; United States	1:04.93	Yuliya Efimova; Russia	1:05.41; ER	Kasey Carlson; United States	1:05.75
200 m breaststroke	Nadja Higl; Serbia	2:21.62; ER	Annamay Pierse; Canada	2:21.84	Mirna Jukić; Austria	2:21.97; NR
50 m butterfly	Marieke Guehrer; Australia	25.48; OC	Zhou Yafei; China	25.57; AS	Ingvild Snildal; Norway	25.58
100 m butterfly	Sarah Sjöström; Sweden	56.06; WR	Jessicah Schipper; Australia	56.23; OC	Jiao Liuyang; China	56.86; AS
200 m butterfly	Jessicah Schipper; Australia	2:03.41; WR	Liu Zige; China	2:03.90; AS	Katinka Hosszú; Hungary	2:04.28
200 m individual medley	Ariana Kukors; United States	2:06.15; WR	Stephanie Rice; Australia	2:07.03; OC	Katinka Hosszú; Hungary	2:07.46; ER
400 m individual medley	Katinka Hosszú; Hungary	4:30.31; CR, ER	Kirsty Coventry; Zimbabwe	4:32.12	Stephanie Rice; Australia	4:32.29
4 × 100 m freestyle relay	Netherlands; Inge Dekker (53.61); Ranomi Kromowidjojo (52.30); Frederike Heemskerk (53.03); Marleen Veldhuis (52.78); Hinkelien Schreuder^{[b]}	3:31.72; WR	Germany; Britta Steffen (52.22) WR; Daniela Samulski (53.49); Petra Dallmann (53.75); Daniela Schreiber (52.37)	3:31.83; NR	Australia; Libby Trickett (52.62) OC; Marieke Guehrer (53.60); Shayne Reese (53.25); Felicity Galvez (53.54); Sally Foster^{[b]} Meagen Nay^{[b]}	3:33.01; OC
4 × 200 m freestyle relay	China; Yang Yu (1:55.47); Zhu Qianwei (1:55.79); Liu Jing (1:56.09); Pang Jiaying (1:54.73)	7:42.08; WR	United States; Dana Vollmer (1:55.29); Lacey Nymeyer (1:57.88); Ariana Kukors (1:55.18); Allison Schmitt (1:54.21); Dagny Knutson^{[b]} Alyssa Anderson^{[b]}	7:42.56; AM	Great Britain; Joanne Jackson (1:55.98); Jazmin Carlin (1:56.78); Caitlin McClatchey (1:56.42); Rebecca Adlington (1:56.33); Hannah Miley^{[b]}	7:45.51; ER
4 × 100 m medley relay	China; Zhao Jing (58.98) AS; Chen Huijia (1:04.12); Jiao Liuyang (56.28); Li Zhesi (52.81)	3:52.19; WR	Australia; Emily Seebohm (59.40); Sarah Katsoulis (1:04.65); Jessicah Schipper (56.19); Libby Trickett (52.34); Sally Foster^{[b]} Stephanie Rice^{[b]} Shayne Reese^{[b]}	3:52.58; OC	Germany; Daniela Samulski (59.85); Sarah Poewe (1:06.81); Annika Mehlhorn (57.14); Britta Steffen (51.99); Daniela Schreiber^{[b]}	3:55.79; ER

Legend: AF African record | AM Americas record | AS Asian record | CR Championship record | ER European record | OC Oceania record | WR World record | NR National record
^{b} Swimmers who participated in the heats only and received medals.

== Records ==
The following world and championship records were set during the competition:

=== World records ===
Date	Round	Event	Established for	Time	Name	Nation
26 July	Semifinal 2	Women's 100 metre butterfly	(same)	56.44	Sarah Sjöström	Sweden
26 July	Final	Men's 400 metre freestyle	(same)	3:40.07	Paul Biedermann	Germany
26 July	Semifinal 2	Women's 200 metre individual medley	(same)	2:07.03	Ariana Kukors	United States
26 July	Final	Women's 400 metre freestyle	(same)	3:59.15	Federica Pellegrini	Italy
26 July	Final	Women's 4 × 100 metre freestyle relay	Women's 100 metre freestyle	52.22	Britta Steffen	Germany
26 July	Final	Women's 4 × 100 metre freestyle relay	(same)	3:31.72	Inge Dekker (53.61); Ranomi Kromowidjojo (52.30); Femke Heemskerk (53.03); Marleen Veldhuis (52.78)	Netherlands
27 July	Final	Men's 100 metre breaststroke	(same)	58.58	Brenton Rickard	Australia
27 July	Final	Women's 100 metre butterfly	(same)	56.06	Sarah Sjöström	Sweden
27 July	Semifinal 2	Women's 100 metre breaststroke	(same)	1:04.84	Rebecca Soni	United States
27 July	Semifinal 1	Women's 100 metre backstroke	(same)	58.48	Anastasia Zuyeva	Russia
27 July	Final	Women's 200 metre individual medley	(same)	2:06.15	Ariana Kukors	United States
28 July	Final	Men's 200 metre freestyle	(same)	1:42.00	Paul Biedermann	Germany
28 July	Final	Women's 100 metre backstroke	(same)	58.12	Gemma Spofforth	Great Britain
28 July	Semifinal 2	Men's 50 metre breaststroke	(same)	26.74	Cameron van der Burgh	South Africa
28 July	Semifinal 1	Women's 200 metre freestyle	(same)	1:53.67	Federica Pellegrini	Italy
29 July	Heat 4	Women's 200 metre butterfly	(same)	2:04.14	Mary DeScenza	United States
29 July	Semifinal 1	Women's 50 metre backstroke	(same)	27.39	Daniela Samulski	Germany
29 July	Semifinal 2	Women's 50 metre backstroke	(same)	27.38	Anastasia Zuyeva	Russia
29 July	Final	Men's 200 metre butterfly	(same)	1:51.51	Michael Phelps	United States
29 July	Final	Women's 200 metre freestyle	(same)	1:52.98	Federica Pellegrini	Italy
29 July	Final	Men's 50 metre breaststroke	(same)	26.67	Cameron van der Burgh	South Africa
29 July	Final	Men's 800 metre freestyle	(same)	7:32.12	Zhang Lin	China
30 July	Final	Men's 200 metre individual medley	(same)	1:54.10	Ryan Lochte	United States
30 July	Semifinal 2	Women's 200 metre breaststroke	(same)	2:20.12	Annamay Pierse	Canada
30 July	Final	Men's 100 metre freestyle	(same)	46.91	César Cielo Filho	Brazil
30 July	Final	Women's 200 metre butterfly	(same)	2:03.41	Jessicah Schipper	Australia
30 July	Semifinal 1	Men's 200 metre breaststroke	(same)	2:07.31	Christian Sprenger	Australia
30 July	Final	Women's 50 metre backstroke	(same)	27.06	Zhao Jing	China
30 July	Final	Women's 4 × 200 metre freestyle relay	(same)	7:42.08	Yang Yu (1:55.47); Zhu Qianwei (1:55.79); Liu Jing (1:56.09); Pang Jiaying (1:54.73)	China
31 July	Final	Women's 100 metre freestyle	(same)	52.07	Britta Steffen	Germany
31 July	Final	Men's 200 metre backstroke	(same)	1:51.92	Aaron Peirsol	United States
31 July	Semifinal 1	Women's 50 metre butterfly	(same)	25.28	Marleen Veldhuis	Netherlands
31 July	Semifinal 2	Women's 50 metre butterfly	(same)	25.07	Therese Alshammar	Sweden
31 July	Semifinal 2	Men's 100 metre butterfly	(same)	50.01	Milorad Čavić	Serbia
31 July	Final	Men's 4 × 200 metre freestyle relay	(same)	6:58.55	Michael Phelps (1:44.49); Ricky Berens (1:44.13); David Walters (1:45.47); Ryan Lochte (1:44.46)	United States
1 August	Final	Women's 200 metre backstroke	(same)	2:04.81	Kirsty Coventry	Zimbabwe
1 August	Final	Men's 100 metre butterfly	(same)	49.82	Michael Phelps	United States
1 August	Semifinal 1	Men's 50 metre backstroke	(same)	24.08	Liam Tancock	Great Britain
1 August	Final	Women's 4 × 100 metre medley relay	(same)	3:52.19	Zhao Jing (58.98); Chen Huijia (1:04.12); Jiao Liuyang (56.28); Li Zhesi (52.81)	China
2 August	Final	Men's 50 metre backstroke	(same)	24.04	Liam Tancock	Great Britain
2 August	Final	Women's 50 metre breaststroke	(same)	30.09	Yuliya Yefimova	Russia
2 August	Final	Women's 50 metre freestyle	(same)	23.73	Britta Steffen	Germany
2 August	Final	Men's 4 × 100 metre medley relay	(same)	3:27.28	Aaron Peirsol (52.19); Eric Shanteau (58.57); Michael Phelps (49.72); David Walters (46.80)	United States

=== Championship records ===
Date	Round	Event	Established for	Time	Name	Nation
26 July	Heat 9	Women's 100 metre butterfly	(same)	56.76	Sarah Sjöström	Sweden
26 July	Heat 7	Women's 200 metre individual medley	(same)	2:08.53	Ariana Kukors	United States
26 July	Heat 20	Men's 50 metre butterfly	(same)	22.90	Roland Schoeman	South Africa
26 July	Heat 21	Men's 50 metre butterfly	(same)	=22.90	Rafael Muñoz	Spain
26 July	Heat 6	Women's 400 metre freestyle	(same)	4:01.96	Federica Pellegrini	Italy
26 July	Heat 14	Men's 100 metre breaststroke	(same)	58.98	Brenton Rickard	Australia
26 July	Heat 2	Women's 4 × 100 metre freestyle relay	(same)	3:35.26	Sally Foster (54.18); Marieke Guehrer (53.47); Shayne Reese (53.19); Meagen Nay (54.42)	Australia
26 July	Heat 3	Women's 4 × 100 metre freestyle relay	(same)	3:34.74	Britta Steffen (53.76); Daniela Samulski (53.81); Petra Dallmann (53.69); Daniela Schreiber (53.48)	Germany
26 July	Heat 4	Women's 4 × 100 metre freestyle relay	Women's 100 metre freestyle	53.02	Francesca Halsall	Great Britain
26 July	Heat 3	Men's 4 × 100 metre freestyle relay	Men's 100 metre freestyle	47.77	Brent Hayden	Canada
26 July	Heat 3	Men's 4 × 100 metre freestyle relay	(same)	3:12.58	Matthew Abood (48.35); Andrew Lauterstein (48.42); Tommaso D'Orsogna (47.82); Matt Targett (48.07)	Australia
26 July	Heat 4	Men's 4 × 100 metre freestyle relay	Men's 100 metre freestyle	47.52	Stefan Nystrand	Sweden
26 July	Heat 4	Men's 4 × 100 metre freestyle relay	(same)	3:11.38	Amaury Leveaux (48.37); Grégory Mallet (47.78); William Meynard (48.11); Fabien Gilot (47.12)	France
26 July	Heat 5	Men's 4 × 100 metre freestyle relay	Men's 100 metre freestyle	47.39	César Cielo Filho	Brazil
26 July	Heat 5	Men's 4 × 100 metre freestyle relay	(same)	3:11.26	César Cielo Filho (47.39); Nicolas Oliveira (47.51); Guilherme Roth (48.15); Fernando Silva (48.21)	Brazil
26 July	Semifinal 1	Men's 50 metre butterfly	(same)	22.68	Rafael Muñoz	Spain
26 July	Semifinal 2	Men's 100 metre breaststroke	(same)	58.96	Eric Shanteau	United States
26 July	Final	Men's 4 × 100 metre freestyle relay	Men's 100 metre freestyle	47.09	César Cielo Filho	Brazil
26 July	Final	Men's 4 × 100 metre freestyle relay	(same)	3:09.21	Michael Phelps (47.78); Ryan Lochte (47.03); Matt Grevers (47.61); Nathan Adrian (46.79)	United States
27 July	Heat 11	Women's 100 metre backstroke	(same)	58.78	Gemma Spofforth	Great Britain
27 July	Heat 10	Women's 100 metre breaststroke	(same)	1:05.66	Rebecca Soni	United States
27 July	Heat 12	Men's 100 metre backstroke	(same)	52.93	Aschwin Wildeboer	Spain
27 July	Semifinal 1	Men's 100 metre backstroke	(same)	52.39	Junya Koga	Japan
27 July	Final	Men's 50 metre butterfly	(same)	22.67	Milorad Čavić	Serbia
27 July	Semifinal 2	Men's 200 metre freestyle	(same)	1:43.65	Paul Biedermann	Germany
28 July	Heat 12	Men's 50 metre breaststroke	(same)	27.26	Barry Murphy	Ireland
28 July	Heat 15	Men's 50 metre breaststroke	(same)	27.15	Brenton Rickard	Australia
28 July	Heat 16	Men's 50 metre breaststroke	(same)	26.92	Cameron van der Burgh	South Africa
28 July	Final	Women's 100 metre backstroke	Women's 50 m backstroke	28.13	Anastasia Zuyeva	Russia
28 July	Semifinal 1	Men's 50 metre breaststroke	(same)	=26.92	Felipe França Silva	Brazil
28 July	Final	Women's 1500 metre freestyle	(same)	15:44.93	Alessia Filippi	Italy
28 July	Final	Men's 100 metre backstroke	(same)	52.26	Junya Koga	Japan
29 July	Heat 12	Women's 50 metre backstroke	(same)	27.85	Zhao Jing	China
29 July	Heat 13	Women's 50 metre backstroke	(same)	27.65	Aleksandra Gerasimenya	Belarus
30 July	Heat 6	Women's 200 metre breaststroke	(same)	2:21.68	Annamay Pierse	Canada
30 July	Heat 5	Men's 200 metre breaststroke	(same)	2:09.28	Giedrius Titenis	Lithuania
30 July	Heat 6	Men's 200 metre breaststroke	(same)	2:09.26	Yevgeniy Ryzhkov	Kazakhstan
30 July	Heat 7	Men's 200 metre breaststroke	(same)	2:09.22	Henrique Barbosa	Brazil
30 July	Heat 8	Men's 200 metre breaststroke	(same)	2:08.85	Loris Facci	Italy
30 July	Heat 9	Men's 200 metre breaststroke	(same)	2:08.55	Eric Shanteau	United States
30 July	Heat 1	Women's 4 × 200 metre freestyle relay	(same)	7:49.04	Caitlin McClatchey (1:57.54); Jazmin Carlin (1:56.45); Hannah Miley (1:58.15); Rebecca Adlington (1:56.90)	Great Britain
30 July	Semifinal 1	Women's 200 metre breaststroke	(same)	2:20.93	Rebecca Soni	United States
30 July	Semifinal 1	Men's 200 metre backstroke	(same)	1:54.06	Aaron Peirsol	United States
31 July	Heat 21	Men's 50 metre freestyle	(same)	21.64	George Bovell	Trinidad and Tobago
31 July	Heat 22	Men's 50 metre freestyle	(same)	21.37	César Cielo Filho	Brazil
31 July	Heat 10	Women's 50 metre butterfly	(same)	25.74	Sarah Sjöström	Sweden
31 July	Heat 13	Women's 50 metre butterfly	(same)	25.44	Therese Alshammar	Sweden
31 July	Heat 6	Women's 200 metre backstroke	(same)	2:06.72	Kirsty Coventry	Zimbabwe
31 July	Semifinal 1	Men's 50 metre freestyle	(same)	21.29	Duje Draganja	Croatia
31 July	Semifinal 2	Men's 50 metre freestyle	(same)	21.21	Frédérick Bousquet	France
31 July	Semifinal 2	Women's 200 metre backstroke	(same)	2:05.86	Kirsty Coventry	Zimbabwe
31 July	Swim-off	Men's 50 metre freestyle	(same)	21.20	George Bovell	Trinidad and Tobago
1 August	Heat 17	Women's 50 metre freestyle	(same)	24.24	Cate Campbell	Australia
1 August	Heat 10	Women's 50 metre breaststroke	(same)	30.34	Kasey Carlson	United States
1 August	Heat 12	Women's 50 metre breaststroke	(same)	30.24	Yuliya Yefimova	Russia
1 August	Heat 13	Men's 50 metre backstroke	(same)	24.49	Guilherme Guido	Brazil
1 August	Final	Men's 50 metre freestyle	(same)	21.08	César Cielo Filho	Brazil
1 August	Semifinal 1	Women's 50 metre freestyle	(same)	24.20	Marleen Veldhuis	Netherlands
1 August	Semifinal 2	Women's 50 metre freestyle	(same)	24.08	Cate Campbell	Australia
1 August	Final	Women's 800 metre freestyle	(same)	8:15.92	Lotte Friis	Denmark
2 August	Heat 3	Men's 4 × 100 m medley relay	(same)	3:29.48	Helge Meeuw (52.46); Hendrik Feldwehr (58.22); Benjamin Starke (51.11); Paul Biedermann (47.69)	Germany
2 August	Final	Women's 400 metre individual medley	(same)	4:30.31	Katinka Hosszú	Hungary
2 August	Final	Men's 4 × 100 m medley relay	Men's 100 m backstroke	52.19	Aaron Peirsol	United States

== See also ==
- 2009 in swimming
- Swimming at the 2007 World Aquatics Championships
- Swimming at the 2008 Summer Olympics
