= Natasha Moodie =

Jamaican swimmer (born 1990)

Personal information
- Full name: Natasha Moodie
- National team: Jamaica
- Born: 8 October 1990 (age 35) Kingston, Jamaica
- Height: 1.854 m (6 ft 1.0 in)
- Weight: 68 kg (150 lb)

Sport
- Sport: Swimming
- Strokes: Freestyle
- Club: South Florida Aquatic Club
- College team: University of Michigan (U.S.)

Natasha Moodie (born 8 October 1990) is a Jamaican competitive swimmer, who specialized in sprint freestyle events. She was a three-time national record holder and NCAA All-American champion, and a member of the Jamaican team at the 2008 Summer Olympics. While studying kinesiology at the University of Michigan in Ann Arbor, Michigan, Moodie trained and swam for the Michigan Wolverines team under head coach Jim Richardson. She is a member of the award-winning Team Rogers in Tulsa, Oklahoma.

Moodie competed for Jamaica in the women's 50 m freestyle at the 2008 Summer Olympics in Beijing. Four months before the Games, she placed first at the Ohio State University's Toyota Grand Prix meet in Columbus, Ohio with an Olympic B-standard time of 26.61 seconds. Moodie swam a lifetime best of 25.95 seconds to overhaul the 26-second barrier and slice her own Jamaican record by 0.14 of a second, but failed to advance past the prelims, finishing fifth in heat eight and thirty-seventh overall.

At the 2009 FINA World Championships in Rome, Italy, Moodie matched her Olympic feat and own Jamaican record of 25.95 in the 50 m freestyle, and attained her personal best of 57.71 in the 100 m freestyle. Her performances in both of her swimming events were not sufficient to put her through to the semifinals.
