= Jolien =

Jolien is a Belgian female given name that may refer to:

- Jolien Boumkwo (born 1993), Belgian field athlete
- Jolien D'Hoore (born 1990), Belgian cyclist
- Jolien Sysmans (born 1992), Belgian swimmer
- Jolien Verschueren (1990–2021), Belgian cyclo-cross cyclist
- Jolien Wittock (born 1990), Belgian volleyball player
