= Britta Steffen =

German swimmer (born 1983)

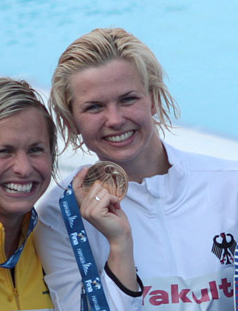
- Steffen with the 100m freestyle gold medal at 2009 world championships

Personal information
- National team: Germany
- Born: 16 November 1983 (age 42) Schwedt, Bezirk Frankfurt, East Germany
- Height: 1.80 m (5 ft 11 in)
- Weight: 60 kg (132 lb)
- Website: britta-steffen.com

Sport
- Sport: Swimming
- Strokes: Freestyle
- Club: SG Neukölln
Medal record
Women's swimming
Representing Germany
Event	1st	2nd	3rd
Olympic Games	2	0	1
World Championships (LC)	2	2	3
World Championships (SC)	1	1	0
European Championships (LC)	7	2	0
European Championships (SC)	5	5	4
Universiade	2	0	0
Total	19	10	8
Olympic Games
Gold medal – first place	2008 Beijing	50 m freestyle
Gold medal – first place	2008 Beijing	100 m freestyle
Bronze medal – third place	2000 Sydney	4 × 200 m freestyle
World Championships (LC)
Gold medal – first place	2009 Rome	50 m freestyle
Gold medal – first place	2009 Rome	100 m freestyle
Silver medal – second place	2007 Melbourne	4 × 200 m freestyle
Silver medal – second place	2009 Rome	4 × 100 m freestyle
Bronze medal – third place	2007 Melbourne	100 m freestyle
Bronze medal – third place	2009 Rome	4 × 100 m medley
Bronze medal – third place	2011 Shanghai	4 × 100 m freestyle
World Championships (SC)
Gold medal – first place	2012 Istanbul	100 m freestyle
Silver medal – second place	2000 Athens	4 × 100 m freestyle
European Championships (LC)
Gold medal – first place	2006 Budapest	50 m freestyle
Gold medal – first place	2006 Budapest	100 m freestyle
Gold medal – first place	2006 Budapest	4 × 100 m freestyle
Gold medal – first place	2006 Budapest	4 × 200 m freestyle
Gold medal – first place	2012 Debrecen	50 m freestyle
Gold medal – first place	2012 Debrecen	4 × 100 m freestyle
Gold medal – first place	2012 Debrecen	4 × 100 m medley
Silver medal – second place	2006 Budapest	4 × 100 m medley
Silver medal – second place	2012 Debrecen	100 m freestyle
European Championships (SC)
Gold medal – first place	2007 Debrecen	100 m freestyle
Gold medal – first place	2007 Debrecen	4 × 50 m medley
Gold medal – first place	2011 Szczecin	50 m freestyle
Gold medal – first place	2011 Szczecin	100 m freestyle
Gold medal – first place	2011 Szczecin	4 × 50 m freestyle
Silver medal – second place	1999 Lisbon	4 × 50 m freestyle
Silver medal – second place	2007 Debrecen	50 m freestyle
Silver medal – second place	2007 Debrecen	4 × 50 m freestyle
Silver medal – second place	2010 Eindhoven	4 × 50 m freestyle
Silver medal – second place	2010 Eindhoven	4 × 50 m medley
Bronze medal – third place	2000 Valencia	4 × 50 m freestyle
Bronze medal – third place	2003 Dublin	4 × 50 m freestyle
Bronze medal – third place	2010 Eindhoven	50 m freestyle
Bronze medal – third place	2010 Eindhoven	100 m freestyle
Summer Universiade
Gold medal – first place	2007 Bangkok	50 m freestyle
Gold medal – first place	2007 Bangkok	100 m freestyle

Britta Steffen (German pronunciation: [ˈbʁi.ta ˈʃtɛfn̩]; born 16 November 1983 in Schwedt, Germany) is a German former competitive swimmer who specialized in freestyle sprint events, winning 2 gold medals at the 2008 Beijing Olympics.

== Biography ==
In 1999, Steffen won six titles at the European Junior Championships, and won a medal as a member of Germany's relay team in the 4 × 200 metre freestyle at the 2000 Summer Olympics. In 2004, she asked to swim the 4×100 m relay. But after the Olympics, she took one year off swimming and concentrated on her studies, which were not finished.

At the 2006 European Championships in Budapest, Steffen clocked 53.30 in the women's 100 m freestyle event, breaking the world record and upstaging the previous record of 53.42 set by Libby Lenton of Australia. Even though Lenton swam a time of 52.99 on 4 April 2007 during the mixed 400 metre freestyle relay, this time was not recognized by the FINA as world record, because the race is not considered to be a FINA event.

At the same championships, Steffen was part of two world record-breaking relay teams. First, the German 4×100 m women's relay team of Dallmann, Goetz, Steffen and Liebs took the Australian 4×100 m freestyle relay (Mills, Lenton, Thomas and Henry) world record of 3:35.94, clocking a time of 3:35.22. The German women's relay team of Dallmann, Samulski, Steffen and Liebs, then swam a time of 7:50.82 to take the previous US 4×200 m freestyle relay (Coughlin, Piper, Vollmer and Sandeno) world record that stood at 7:53.42.

At the 2007 World Championships in Melbourne she finished third in the 100 metre freestyle event and second in the 4 × 200 metre freestyle relay.

During the 2008 Summer Olympic Games in Beijing, China, Steffen won the 100-meter freestyle, catching world record-holder Libby Trickett of Australia at the last stroke. Steffen touched in 53.12 seconds, bettering her own Olympic record of 53.38 set on the leadoff leg of the 4×100 m freestyle relay. Steffen then edged out Dara Torres to win the 50-meter freestyle gold with a time of 24.06 seconds, winning by 0.01 seconds.

At the 2009 World Championships in Rome, Steffen clocked 52.07 in the 100 m freestyle event, breaking the world record and upstaging the previous record of 52.22 set by herself four days before. Two days later on 2 August 2009, Steffen won her second title in the 50 m freestyle event, breaking the world record with a time of 23.73 seconds.

Her 100-metre freestyle long course world record was broken by Cate Campbell on 2 July 2016. Her 50-metre freestyle long course world record was broken by Sarah Sjöström on 29 July 2017.

Steffen officially retired from competitive swimming in 2013.

== See also ==
- List of German records in swimming
- World record progression 50 metres freestyle
- World record progression 100 metres freestyle

Records
Preceded by Marleen Veldhuis	Women's 50 metre freestyle world record holder (long course); 2 August 2009 – 29 July 2017	Succeeded by Sarah Sjöström
Preceded by Libby Trickett; Libby Trickett	Women's 100 metre freestyle world record holder (long course); 2 August 2006 – 27 March 2008; 25 June 2009 – 2 July 2016	Succeeded by Libby Trickett; Cate Campbell

Awards
Preceded by Magdalena Neuner	German Sportswoman of the Year; 2008	Succeeded by Steffi Nerius
