= Maria Grace Koh =

Bruneian swimmer and singer (born 1992)

- Also known as: Eia
- Born: Maria Grace Koh; 25 October 1992 (age 33); Brunei
- Genres: Pop; R&B; Soul; Funk
- Occupations: Singer-songwriter; swimmer
- Instruments: Vocals
- Years active: 2013–present
- Label: Indasoul Records
- Spouse: Kevin Lau (m. 2016)
- Sports career
- Sport: Swimming
- Strokes: Backstroke, Freestyle, Butterfly
- Club: Skim Renang Brunei

Maria Grace Koh (born 25 October 1992), or commonly known by her stage name Eia, is a Bruneian singer-songwriter and retired professional swimmer of Chinese descent. Koh is one of Brunei's fastest female swimmers and has previously held 10 individual national records. Thanks to her triumphs in several competitions, she and other exceptional female swimmers from the late 2000s and early 2010s heralded in a new age of swimming for the country.

== Swimming career ==
Despite being under 18 years old, Koh, a student at Jerudong International School (JIS), has become a seasoned member of the national swimming squad, having competed for her country since she was just 10 years old.

On 24 June 2007, the Brunei Age Group Championships were held in Berakas. Koh broke five national records on the first day of competition, swimming 13–14 times in the 50-meter freestyle (29.47), 100-meter backstroke (1:14.37), 50-meter breaststroke (38.37), 100-meter butterfly (1:12.32), and 200-meter individual medley (2:41.70).

On 4 June 2008, Koh, then 15 years old, participated in the 12th Sukma Games in Terengganu, Malaysia. She broke five national records but failed to take home any medals. Due to a lack of documentation, shot putter Mohammed Yazid Yatimi Yusof and swimmer Koh were disqualified from the tournament, and Brunei was kicked out of the 2008 Summer Olympics opening ceremony. The two-man team was not allowed entry because their national organization neglected to register the delegation.

In the 17th Brunei Age-Group Swimming Championship, which took place in the swimming pool of the Hassanal Bolkiah National Sports Complex from 3 to 5 July 2009, she competed on behalf of Skim Renang Brunei (SRB). Koh, who won seven gold medals.

The next year, Koh took part in the 13th FINA World Championships held in Italy, where she competed in many 50-meter pool events. She competed in the women's 100-meter backstroke on 27 July 2009, finishing in 1:17.73. She participated in the women's 50-meter backstroke competition on 29 July and finished in 35.25 seconds. She raced the women's 100-meter freestyle the next day, 30 July, and set a new record of 1:06.93. She competed in the women's 50-meter butterfly on 31 July, and finished in 32.59 seconds. At last, on 1 August, she finished in 30.17 seconds for the women's 50-meter freestyle.

Due to Maria's age, there was no female representative from Brunei in the 14th FINA World Championships in Shanghai. She was the only swimmer represented the nation at the 2011 Commonwealth Youth Games, which were held on the Isle of Man from September 7–13. She competed in seven different events but was not able to make it to the finals.

Koh participated in the FINA/Arena Swimming World Cup 2011, which was held in Singapore in a 25-meter pool, two years later, at the age of 19. She swam in the women's 50-meter freestyle on 4 November, finishing in 30.01 seconds, and the women's 50-meter backstroke, with a timing of 34.57 seconds. She participated the next day, 5 November, in the 2omen's 50-meter butterfly, finishing in 32.09 seconds, and the women's 100-metr freestyle, clocking in at 1:05.74.

== Music career ==
Following her retirement from professional swimming, Koh studied at Lasalle College of the Arts in Singapore, where she earned a Bachelor of Arts (Hons) in Performing Arts with First Class Honors. Maria had to do a solo pop recital for the "Esplanade - On the Waterfront" series in front of 2,000 people in April 2013 as part of an assessment. Her resolve to pursue a career as a professional recording artist and performer was reinforced by this encounter. She had a profound realisation on stage during her solo performance: she knew that singing was her destiny from the beginning.

Written at the age of 15, "Hello World" was her debut song, which Koh published on her 20th birthday. She was once more granted the chance to represent Brunei on the international arena in 2013, this time at World Championships of Performing Arts (WCOPA) in Los Angeles. With four of her own original songs, she returned to participate at WCOPA the following year, having focused on creating her own voice and repertoire. She left the World Awards with four gold medals, one silver, one bronze, and four division championships. She also became the official hostess of the championship in 2015, which was held in Long Beach, California.

Her recent music has notable Soul and R&B influence. She asserted that her producers, Marc "M. Doc" Williams and C-Ray of Indasoul Entertainment in the United States, are the finest group she could possibly collaborate with.

Koh was one of the three judges for the Mandarin singing competition "Voice of Sarjana," which took place on Friday, 12 July 2019. The judges' criteria included vocal quality, diction and pronunciation, pace, stage presence, costuming, and audience effect.

== Personal life ==
Koh married Kevin Lau, the eldest son of Lau Chai Seng of Aewon Brunei, on 28 December 2016. In 2017, she talked about how they weren't close for a while, although were friends for almost ten years.

Maria also works part-time at JIS in the Learning Support Department.
