= Emma Wilkins =

British swimmer

Personal information
- Full name: Emma Louise Wilkins
- Nationality: British
- Born: 1 February 1991 (age 35) Stafford, United Kingdom

Sport
- Sport: Swimming
- Strokes: Freestyle
- Club: Loughborough University

Emma Louise Wilkins (born 1 February 1991) is a British sprint freestyle swimmer.

Wilkins represented Great Britain at the 2008 European Short Course Swimming Championships in the 50 m and 100 m freestyle and in the 4×50 m freestyle relay swimming events. She also competed at the 2009 World Aquatics Championships in Rome, swimming in the 50 m freestyle.

Emma was born in Stafford, Staffordshire and raised in Cannock where she attended Cardinal Griffin High School before being awarded a swimming scholarship at Plymouth College Independent School, where she moved at the age of 16 years in order to combine her education and sporting aspirations.
