= Khadidiatou Dieng =

Senegalese swimmer

Personal information
- Born: 1992 (age 33–34)

Sport
- Sport: Swimming
- Strokes: Backstroke, freestyle

Khadidiatou Dieng (born 1992) is a Senegalese swimmer. She competed in the 50 m freestyle, 50 m, 100 m backstroke, 4 × 100 m freestyle relay (where she and 3 other swimmers broke the Senegalese record with a time of 4:15.42) and 4 x 100 medley relay (with a record breaking time of 4:46.20) events at the 2009 World Aquatics Championships and in the 50 m freestyle and 50 m backstroke events at the 2013 World Aquatics Championships.
