= Gao Chang =

Chinese swimmer (born 1987)

GAO Chang
Personal information
- Nationality: China
- Born: January 29, 1987 (age 39) Jinan, Shandong, China
- Height: 1.78 m (5 ft 10 in)
- Weight: 70 kg (154 lb)

Sport
- Sport: Swimming
- Strokes: Backstroke
Medal record
World Championships (LC)
Silver medal – second place	2005 Montreal	50 m backstroke
Silver medal – second place	2011 Shanghai	4×100 m medley
Bronze medal – third place	2009 Rome	50 m backstroke
World Championships (SC)
Gold medal – first place	2010 Dubai	4×100 m medley
Silver medal – second place	2004 Indianapolis	50 backstroke
Silver medal – second place	2004 Indianapolis	100 backstroke
Silver medal – second place	2008 Manchester	50 backstroke
Bronze medal – third place	2006 Shanghai	50 backstroke
Bronze medal – third place	2006 Shanghai	100 backstroke
Bronze medal – third place	2006 Shanghai	4×100 medley
Bronze medal – third place	2010 Dubai	100 m backstroke
Universiade
Gold medal – first place	2011 Shenzhen	4×100 m medley

Gao Chang (born January 29, 1987, in Jinan, Shandong, China) is a Chinese swimmer, who competed at the 2004 Summer Olympics and who was a part of China's 2008 Olympic Team. She was part of the Chinese 4 x 100 m medley relay team at the 2012 Summer Olympics. Gao Chang won the gold in the 50-metre backstroke final of 2010 Asian Games.

== Major achievements ==
- 2004 Olympic Games - 15th 100 m back;
- 2004 World Short-Course Championships - 2nd 50 m/100 m back;
- 2005 World Championships - 2nd 50 m back;
- 2005 Asian Winter Games - 1st 50 m/100 m back;
- 2005 National Games - 1st 100 m back;
- 2006 World Short-Course Championships - 3rd 50 m/100 m back;
- 2007 Asian Games - 2nd 50 m back;
- 2008 World Short-Course Championships - 2nd 50 m back
- 2010 Asian Games - 1st 50 m back

== Records ==
- 2004 National Championships - 28.48, 50 m back (AR);
- 2004 Short-Course World Cup - 58.49, 100 m back (NR);
- 2005 World Championships - 28.31, 50 m back (Tournament Record);
- 2008 World Short-Course Championships - 26.70 50 m back (AR)

== See also ==
- List of Asian records in swimming
- List of Chinese records in swimming
