= Anna-Liisa Põld =

Estonian swimmer (born 1990)

Personal information
- National team: Estonia
- Born: 24 August 1990 (age 35) Tartu, Estonia
- Height: 1.65 m (5 ft 5 in)
- Weight: 60 kg (132 lb)

Sport
- Sport: Swimming
- Strokes: Backstroke, medley, butterfly
- Club: North Coast Aquatics (U.S.)
- College team: University of Florida (U.S.)
- Coach: Jeff Pease (U.S.)

Anna-Liisa Põld (born 24 August 1990) is an Estonian-born American competition swimmer who has represented Estonia in international events. She competes in the backstroke, butterfly, and individual medley events. She is a two-time national record-holder at the FINA World Championships, and a multiple-time high school and collegiate record-holder. She also represented her birth nation Estonia at the 2008 Summer Olympics in Beijing, China.

== Biography ==
Põld, a native of Tartu, Estonia, moved with her family to the United States in 1992, and finally settled in Carmel Valley, California. She also held a dual citizenship for both Estonia and United States, which made her eligible to represent her birth nation in future international competitions. She attended Torrey Pines High School in San Diego, California, where she became a member of the Falcons' CIF San Diego Section Division I title team. She won section championship titles for the 100 yd backstroke, and helped her team to set national high school marks, and section records in the 200 m medley, 200 m freestyle, and 400 m freestyle relays.

Põld was officially admitted to the high school swimming team, but she decided to relinquish her role to focus on qualifying for the Olympics. In addition to her prior commitments, she was approached by the Estonian Olympic Committee (Estonian: Eesti Olümpiakomitee, EOK) to become a member of the national swimming team, and thereby represented Estonia in various swimming tournaments, including the Olympic Games.

== International career ==
Representing her birth nation Estonia, Põld competed in the women's 400 m individual medley at the 2008 Summer Olympics in Beijing. She scored a time of 4:54.43 to claim the top spot and comfortably register under the FINA B-cut (4:55.06) by more than half a second at the Texas Long Course Invitational Meet five months earlier in Austin, Texas. Swimming in the opening heat, Põld charged her own way to save the fourth spot over Athens 2004 Olympian Nimitta Thaveesupsoonthorn of Thailand by a wide, 3.97-second gap in 4:58.21. Põld missed an opportunity to enter the top eight final, as she finished thirty-fifth overall in the prelims.

After the Olympics, Põld graduated from high school. She accepted an athletic scholarship to attend the University of Florida in Gainesville, Florida, where she swam for coach Gregg Troy's Florida Gators swimming and diving team in National Collegiate Athletic Association (NCAA) and Southeastern Conference (SEC) competition. She helped the Gators claim the conference team title at the SEC Championships in Auburn, Alabama by setting career-best marks for the 200-yard backstroke and 400-yard individual medley events. In 2009, Põld competed once again at the FINA World Championships in Rome, Italy, where she finally set a new Estonian record time of 2:19.46 in the preliminary heats of the women's 200-meter individual medley.

At the peak of her swimming career, Põld was named CSCAA Scholar All-American Honorable Mention for three consecutive years, because of her dedication and recognition to her sport and to her participation in the international stage.

== See also ==
- List of Estonian records in swimming
- List of University of Florida alumni
- List of University of Florida Olympians
