= SG Essen =

Club information
- Full name: Startgemeinschaft Essen
- City: Essen

Swimming
- Head coach: Horst Melzer

The SG Essen (full name: Startgemeinschaft Essen) is a swimming club in Essen (North Rhine-Westphalia, Germany). In effect, it is a union of the swimming sections of 13 sports clubs. The SG Essen is one of the most successful swimming associations in West Germany. The woman team, for instance, is in the first Bundesliga (i.e. national league), the man team in the second.
