= Daniela Samulski =

German swimmer

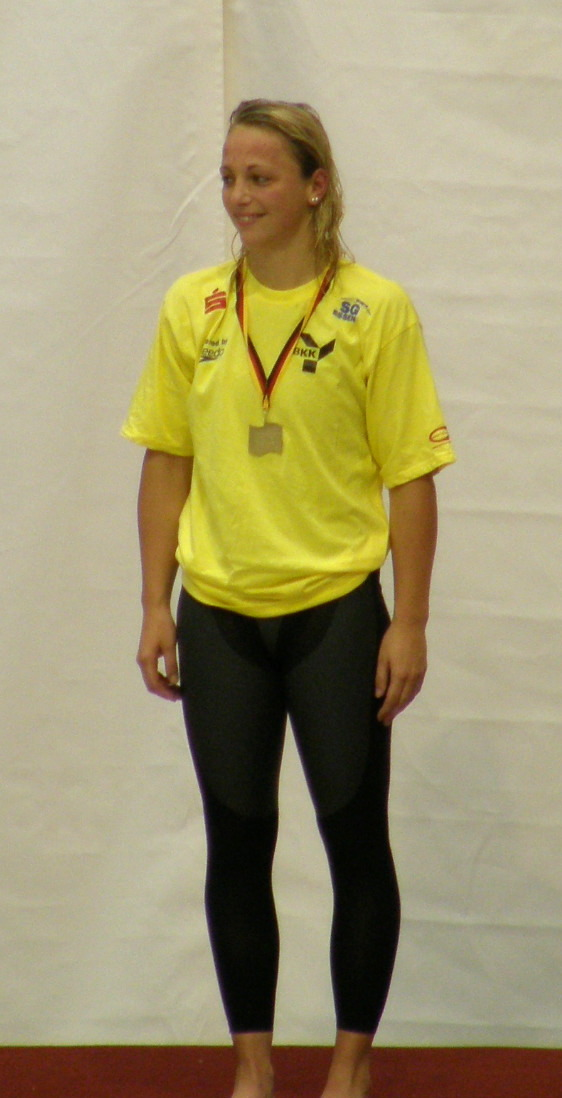
- Daniela Samulski in 2009

Personal information
- Nationality: German
- Born: 31 May 1984 Berlin, Germany
- Died: 22 May 2018 (aged 33)
- Height: 1.72 m (5 ft 8 in)
- Weight: 62 kg (137 lb)

Sport
- Sport: Swimming
- Strokes: backstroke, freestyle, butterfly
- Club: SG Essen
Medal record
Representing Germany
World Championships (LC)
Silver medal – second place	2009 Rome	50 m backstroke
Silver medal – second place	2009 Rome	4 × 100 m freestyle
Bronze medal – third place	2009 Rome	4 × 100 m medley
European Championships (LC)
Silver medal – second place	2002 Berlin	50 m butterfly
Gold medal – first place	2006 Budapest	4 × 200 m freestyle
Gold medal – first place	2010 Budapest	4 × 100 m freestyle
Silver medal – second place	2010 Budapest	50 m backstroke
Bronze medal – third place	2010 Budapest	4 × 100 m medley
European Championships (SC)
Silver medal – second place	2000 Valencia	4 × 50 m medley
Bronze medal – third place	2000 Valencia	50 m backstroke
Bronze medal – third place	2000 Valencia	4 × 50 m freestyle
Silver medal – second place	2005 Trieste	4 × 50 m medley
Bronze medal – third place	2005 Trieste	4 × 50 m freestyle
Gold medal – first place	2006 Helsinki	4 × 50 m medley
Bronze medal – third place	2006 Helsinki	4 × 50 m freestyle
Silver medal – second place	2008 Rijeka	4 × 50 m medley
Bronze medal – third place	2009 Istanbul	4 × 50 m freestyle
Military World Games
Gold medal – first place	2007 Hyderabad	100 m freestyle
Silver medal – second place	2007 Hyderabad	50 m butterfly
Silver medal – second place	2007 Hyderabad	50 m freestyle

Daniela Samulski (31 May 1984 – 22 May 2018) was a German swimmer who won three medals at the 2009 World Championships. She competed at the 2000 and 2008 Olympics in five events, and her best achievement was fourth place in the 4 × 100 m freestyle relay in 2000. Samulski retired in early 2011 to concentrate on her studies.

On 22 May 2018, at age 33, Samulski died of cancer.

== See also ==
- World record progression 50 metres backstroke

Records
Preceded by Sophie Edington & Zhao Jing	Women's 50 metre backstroke world record holder (long course); 26 June 2009 – 29 July 2009	Succeeded by Anastasia Zuyeva
