= Aisling Cooney =

Irish swimmer (born 1990)

Personal information
- Full name: Aisling Margaret Cooney
- National team: Ireland
- Born: 27 July 1990 (age 35) Sandymount, Dublin, Ireland
- Height: 1.71 m (5 ft 7 in)
- Weight: 65 kg (143 lb)

Sport
- Sport: Swimming
- Strokes: Backstroke
- College team: ESB Swimming Club
- Coach: Bill McCarthy

Aisling Margaret Cooney (born July 27, 1990) is an Irish swimmer, who specialized in backstroke events. She represented her nation Ireland at the 2008 Summer Olympics, and has currently owned two Irish national records in both the 50 and 100 m backstroke. Cooney also trained for ESB Swimming Club in Dublin under the tutelage of head coach Bill McCarthy.

Cooney competed, as a 17-year-old teen, for the Irish team in the women's 100 m backstroke at the 2008 Summer Olympics in Beijing. She smashed a national record of 1:02.24 for a blazing top finish at the Irish Long Course Championships three months earlier in Dublin, just half a second away from the FINA A-cut (1:01.70). Swimming on the outside lane in heat four, Cooney went out hard and touched behind the leader Julia Wilkinson of Canada at the halfway turn, but despite giving it everything that she had, faded down the stretch to round out the field in a respectable 1:02.50. Cooney failed to advance to the semifinals, as she finished thirty-first overall out of 49 swimmers in the prelims.
