= Heather MacLean (swimmer) =

Canadian swimmer

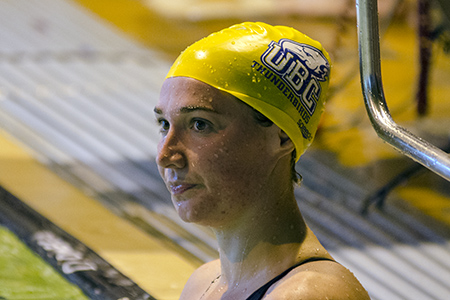

Personal information
- Full name: Heather MacLean
- National team: Canada
- Born: April 1, 1992 (age 34) Mississauga, Ontario
- Height: 1.83 m (6 ft 0 in)
- Weight: 70 kg (150 lb)

Sport
- Sport: Swimming
- Strokes: Freestyle
- Club: Etobicoke Swim Club
- College team: University of British Columbia

Heather MacLean (born April 1, 1992) is a Canadian competitive swimmer. At the 2012 Summer Olympics in London, she competed for the national team in the women's 4x100-metre freestyle relay, which finished in 11th place in the heats, and did not advance to the event final.

Sister Brittany MacLean was also a member of the 2012 Canadian Olympic swimming team.
