= Anastasia Aksenova =

Russian swimmer

Personal information
- Full name: Anastasiya Sergeyevna Aksenova
- National team: Russia
- Born: 5 March 1990 (age 36) Ukhta, Russian SFSR, Soviet Union
- Height: 1.82 m (6 ft 0 in)
- Weight: 65 kg (143 lb)

Sport
- Sport: Swimming
- Strokes: Freestyle
- Club: Suduroyar Svimjifelag (FAR)
- Coach: Jon Bjarnason (FAR)
Medal record
Women's swimming
Representing Russia
World Junior Championships
Gold medal – first place	2006 Rio de Janeiro	4×100 m medley

Anastasiya Sergeyevna Aksenova (also Anastasia Aksenova, Russian: Анастасия Серге́евна Аксенова; born March 5, 1990) is a Russian swimmer, who specialized in sprint freestyle events. She represented her nation Russia in a sprint freestyle swimming double at the 2008 Summer Olympics, and has also claimed multiple Russian championship titles and national records in both the individual and relay freestyle events (long and short course). Aksenova was also a member of Suduroyar Svimjifelag in Vagur, Faroe Islands, under the tutelage of head coach Jon Bjarnason.

Aksenova competed in a sprint freestyle double, and as a member of the Russian swimming team in both the freestyle and medley relays at the 2008 Summer Olympics in Beijing. Leading up to the Games, she finished under the FINA B-cut with a fastest final time of 25.57 in the 50 and 55.51 in the 100 m freestyle at the Russian Open Championships in Moscow to ensure her selection to the Olympic swimming team.

On the first day of the competition, Aksenova teamed up with Daria Belyakina, Yelena Sokolova, and Svetlana Karpeeva in the 4 × 100 m freestyle relay. Swimming the lead-off leg in heat one, Aksenova posted a split of 56.57 to give the Russians a sixth-place time and twelfth overall in 3:42.52. In the 100 m freestyle, Aksenova came from fifth at the turn to hold off the fast-charging Venezuelan swimmer Arlene Semeco for the third spot and twenty-fifth overall in a bodysuit best of 55.29.

On the last day of the prelims, Aksenova swam her two events with only an hour in between. First, she rounded out the top three swimmers in heat nine of the 50 m freestyle with a scorching 25.51, but finished only in twenty-eighth overall. One hour later, Aksenova and her teammates Anastasia Zuyeva, Yuliya Yefimova, and Natalya Sutyagina had entered the top eight final with a fifth-seeded time in 3:59.66, before keeping their position intact two days later. Handing the anchor duties on the final exchange, Aksenova fired off a freestyle split of 54.13 to give the Russian foursome a fifth-place time in a much-deserving 3:57.84.
