= Sabine Hazboun =

Palestinian swimmer

Personal information
- Nationality: Palestinian
- Born: June 11, 1994 (age 31) Bethlehem, Palestine
- Weight: 114 lb (52 kg)

Sport
- Country: Palestine
- Sport: Swimming
- Event: Women's 50m Freestyle

Sabine Hazboun (Arabic: سابين حزبون; born 1994) is a Palestinian-born Spanish swimmer. She was born in Bethlehem. She competed in the women's 50m freestyle at the 2012 Summer Olympics in London, finishing with a personal best time of 28.28 seconds. She also competed in 5 world swimming championships, 2 Asian Games, Youth Olympic Games, Arab Games and other international championships. She trained in Barcelona.
