= Rugilė Mileišytė =

Lithuanian swimmer (born 1988)

Personal information
- Full name: Rugilė Mileišytė-Binevičienė
- National team: Lithuania
- Born: 11 May 1988 (age 38) Kaunas, Lithuanian SSR, Soviet Union
- Height: 1.74 m (5 ft 9 in)
- Weight: 64 kg (141 lb)

Sport
- Sport: Swimming
- Strokes: Freestyle
- College team: Washington State University (U.S.)

Rugilė Mileišytė (born 11 May 1988), also known as Rugilė Binevičienė, is a Lithuanian swimmer, who specialized in sprint freestyle events. She is a multiple-time Lithuanian champion and a five-time national record holder for both the freestyle and medley relay events. Mileišytė is a member of the swimming team for the Washington State Cougars, and a graduate of social sciences at Washington State University in Pullman, Washington.

Mileisyte qualified for the women's 50 m freestyle at the 2008 Summer Olympics in Beijing, by clearing a FINA B-standard entry time of 26.32 in a time trial from the Seven Hill Trophy in Rome, Italy. She won the sixth heat by 0.28 of a second ahead of Papua New Guinea's Anna-Liza Mopio-Jane in a lifetime best of 26.19 seconds. Mileisyte failed to advance into the semifinals, as she matched her thirty-ninth-place tie with two-time Olympian and South Carolina Gamecocks swimmer Sharntelle McLean of Trinidad and Tobago in the preliminary heats.

At the 2009 FINA World Championships in Rome, Italy, Mileisyte helped out her team to set two Lithuanian records in the preliminary heats of both freestyle and medley relays, clocking at 3:54.97 and 4:12.30, respectively.

Mileisyte is married to former swimmer and three-time Olympian Saulius Binevičius. She is currently working as an intern, along with Binevicius, for the swimming team at Plymouth College in England.
