= Anahit Barseghyan =

Armenian swimmer (born 1994)

Personal information
- Full name: Anahit Barseghyan
- Nationality: Armenia
- Born: March 3, 1994 (age 32) Kharkiv, Ukraine

Sport
- Sport: Swimming
- Strokes: Backstroke

Anahit Barseghyan (Armenian: Անահիտ Բարսեղյան, born March 3, 1994) is an Armenian swimmer. She competed at the 2012 Summer Olympics in the women's 100 metre backstroke. Barseghyan finished in 44th place in the heats.
