= Jolien Sysmans =

Belgian swimmer (born 1992)

Personal information
- Nationality: Belgian
- Born: 1 September 1992 (age 32); Geel

Sport
- Sport: Swimming

Jolien Sysmans (born 1 September 1992) is a Belgian swimmer. She was born in Geel. She competed in the women's 50m freestyle at the 2012 Summer Olympics in London, finishing with a time of 25.60 seconds in 31st place in the heats.
