= Jennet Saryýewa =

Turkmenistan swimmer (born 1994)

Personal information
- Born: March 30, 1994 (age 32) Ashgabat, Turkmenistan

Sport
- Sport: Swimming

Jennet Saryyeva (born 30 March 1994) is a Turkmenistan swimmer. At the 2012 Summer Olympics, she competed in the Women's 400 metre freestyle, finishing in 35th (last) place in the heats. Her time of 5:40.29 was nearly a minute behind that of the next slowest competitor, but it set a new Turkmenistan record.
