= Li Zhesi =

Chinese swimmer (born 1995)

Personal information
- Born: August 7, 1995 (age 30) Shenyang, Liaoning

Sport
- Sport: Swimming
- Strokes: Freestyle
- College team: Ohio State University
Medal record
Women's swimming
Representing China
World Championships (LC)
Gold medal – first place	2009 Rome	4×100 m medley
Silver medal – second place	2011 Shanghai	4×100 m medley
World Championships (SC)
Gold medal – first place	2010 Dubai	4×100 m medley
Bronze medal – third place	2010 Dubai	4×100 m freestyle

Li Zhesi (Chinese: 李哲思; pinyin: Li Zhésī or Liz Li; born 7 August 1995 in Shenyang, Liaoning) is a female Chinese swimmer, who competed for Team China at the 2008 Summer Olympics.

In June 2012, the China Anti-Doping Agency announced Li tested positive for the performance-enhancing drug erythropoietin (EPO). She was dropped from the Olympic team.

== Major achievements ==
- 2007 National Intercity Games – 1st; 50m free
- 2007 National Winter Championships – 1st; 50m free
- 2009 FINA World Championships – 1st (World Record); 4 × 100 m medley relay
