= Estellah Fils Rabetsara =

Malagasy swimmer

Personal information
- National team: Madagascar
- Born: May 29, 1994 (age 32) Antsirabe, Madagascar
- Height: 1.67 m (5 ft 6 in)
- Weight: 55 kg (121 lb)

Sport
- Sport: Swimming
- Strokes: Freestyle

Aina Estellah Fils Rabetsara (born 29 May 1994) is a swimmer who competed for Madagascar at the 2012 Summer Olympics in the Women's 100m freestyle. She placed 44th with a time of 1:01.11 and did not advance to the semifinal. Rabetsara competed in the same event in 2012.
