= August 2009 in sports =

<<	August 2009					>>
Su	Mo	Tu	We	Th	Fr	Sa
						1
2	3	4	5	6	7	8
9	10	11	12	13	14	15
16	17	18	19	20	21	22
23	24	25	26	27	28	29
30	31
Sports

This list shows notable sports-related deaths, events, and notable outcomes that occurred in August of 2009.

== Deaths in August ==
- 8: Daniel Jarque
- 24: Toni Sailer
- 29: Frank Gardner

== Current sporting seasons ==
=== Australian rules football 2009 ===
- Australian Football League

=== Auto racing 2009 ===
- Formula One
- Sprint Cup
- IRL IndyCar Series
- World Rally Championship
- Formula Two
- Nationwide Series
- Camping World Truck Series
- GP2
- WTTC
- V8 Supercar
- American Le Mans
- Le Mans Series
- Superleague Formula
- Rolex Sports Car Series
- FIA GT Championship
- Formula Three
- World Series by Renault
- Deutsche Tourenwagen Masters
- Super GT

=== Baseball 2009 ===
- Major League Baseball
- Nippon Professional Baseball

=== Basketball 2009 ===
- WNBA
  - NBA
- NCAA Division I men
- NCAA Division I women
- Philippine collegiate:
  - NCAA
  - UAAP

=== Canadian football 2009 ===
- Canadian Football League

=== Football (soccer) 2009 ===
National teams competitions

- 2010 FIFA World Cup Qualifying

International clubs competitions

- UEFA (Europe) Champions League
- Europa League
- AFC (Asia) Champions League
- CAF (Africa) Champions League
- CONCACAF (North & Central America) Champions League

Domestic (national) competitions

- Argentina
- Australia
- Brazil
- England
- France
- Germany
- Italy
- Japan
- Norway
- Russia
- Scotland
- Spain
- Major League Soccer (USA & Canada)

=== Golf 2009 ===
- European Tour
- PGA Tour
- LPGA Tour
- Champions Tour

=== Lacrosse 2009 ===
- Major League Lacrosse

=== Motorcycle racing 2009 ===
- Superbike World Championship
- Supersport racing

=== Rugby league 2009 ===
- Super League
- NRL

=== Rugby union 2009 ===
- Top 14
- Currie Cup
- Air New Zealand Cup

== Days of the month ==
=== August 31, 2009 (Monday) ===
==== Cycling ====
- Vuelta a España:
  - Stage 3 – Zutphen (Netherlands) to Venlo (Netherlands), 185 km: (1) Greg Henderson (NZL) (Team Columbia–HTC) 4h 41' 01" (2) Borut Božič (SLO) (Vacansoleil Pro Cycling Team) s.t. (3) Óscar Freire (ESP) (Rabobank) s.t.
  - General Classification: (1) Fabian Cancellara (SUI) (Team Saxo Bank) 9h 29' 33" (2) Henderson + 6" (3) Gerald Ciolek (GER) (Team Milram) + 8"

==== Football (soccer) ====
- Women's Euro in Finland: (teams in **bold** advance to the quarterfinals)
  - Group C:
    - Russia 0–2 **Italy**
    - **Sweden** 1–1 **England**
      - Standings: Sweden 7 points, Italy 6, England 4, Russia 0.
- Nehru Cup Final in New Delhi:
  - Syria 1–1 (ET) **India**. India win 5–4 in penalty shootout.

==== Tennis ====
- U.S. Open, day 1: (seeding in parentheses)
  - Men's singles, first round:
    - Roger Federer (SUI) [1] def. Devin Britton (USA) 6–1, 6–3, 7–5
    - Andy Roddick (USA) [5] def. Björn Phau (GER) 6–1 6–4 6–2
    - Nikolay Davydenko (RUS) [8] def. Dieter Kindlmann (GER) 6–3, 6–4, 7–5
  - Women's singles, first round:
    - Serena Williams (USA) [2] def. Alexa Glatch (USA) 6–4, 6–1
    - Venus Williams (USA) [3] def. Vera Dushevina (RUS) 6–7(5) 7–5 6–3
    - Vera Zvonareva (RUS) [7] def. Nuria Llagostera Vives (ESP) 6–0, 6–4
    - Victoria Azarenka (BLR) [8] def. Alexandra Dulgheru (ROU) 6–1, 6–1
    - Flavia Pennetta (ITA) [10] def. Edina Gallovits (ROU) 6–0, 6–4

=== August 30, 2009 (Sunday) ===
==== Auto racing ====
- Formula One:
  - Belgian Grand Prix in Spa, Belgium:
    - (1) Kimi Räikkönen (FIN) (Ferrari) 1:23:50.995 (2) Giancarlo Fisichella (ITA) (Force India–Mercedes) +0.939 (3) Sebastian Vettel (GER) (Red Bull–Renault) +3.875
      - Drivers' standings (after 12 of 17 races): (1) Jenson Button (GBR) (Brawn-Mercedes) 72 points (2) Rubens Barrichello (BRA) (Brawn-Mercedes) 56 (3) Vettel (Red Bull-Renault) 53
      - Constructors' standings: (1) Brawn-Mercedes 128 (2) Red Bull-Renault 104.5 (3) Ferrari 56
- Nationwide Series:
  - NAPA Auto Parts 200 in Montreal, Quebec:
    - (1) Carl Edwards (Missouri) (Ford, Roush Fenway Racing) (2) Marcos Ambrose (Australia) (Toyota, JTG Daugherty Racing) (3) Andrew Ranger (Quebec) (Toyota, CJM Racing)

==== Baseball ====
- Little League World Series in South Williamsport, Pennsylvania:
  - Final: Chula Vista, California 6, Taoyuan City, Chinese Taipei 3

==== Basketball ====
- Americas Championship in San Juan, Puerto Rico: (teams in **bold** advance to the quarterfinals)
  - Group A:
    - **Uruguay** 54–49 **Mexico**
    - **Puerto Rico** 90–70 **Canada**
      - Standings: Puerto Rico 8 points, Uruguay 7, Canada 6, Mexico 5, Virgin Islands 4.
  - Group B:
    - **Brazil** 84–64 **Panama**
    - **Argentina** 89–87(OT) **Dominican Republic**
      - Standings: Brazil 8 points, Argentina, Dominican Republic 6, Panama, Venezuela 5.
- EuroBasket qualification additional qualifying round, final series second leg: (first leg score in parentheses)
  - **France** 92–54 (66–70) Belgium. France win 158–124 on aggregate.
    - France qualify for EuroBasket 2009.

==== Cricket ====
- New Zealand in Sri Lanka:
  - 2nd Test in Colombo, day 5:
    - Sri Lanka 416 & 311/5d; New Zealand 234 & 397 (123.5 ov, Daniel Vettori 140). **Sri Lanka win by 96 runs, Sri Lanka win the 2-match series 2–0**.
- Australia in England:
  - 1st Twenty20 in Manchester:
    - Australia 145/4 (20/20 ov); England 4/2 (1.1/20 ov). **No result, 2-match series level 0–0.**
- Afghanistan in Netherlands:
  - 1st ODI in Amstelveen:
    - Netherlands 188 (47 ov); Afghanistan 180 (49.5 ov). **Netherlands win by 8 runs, Netherlands lead the 2-match series 1–0.**

==== Cycling ====
- Vuelta a España:
  - Stage 2 – Assen (Netherlands) to Emmen (Netherlands), 202 km: (1) Gerald Ciolek (GER) (Team Milram) 4h 43' 12" (2) Fabio Sabatini (ITA) (Liquigas) s.t. (3) Roger Hammond (GBR) (Cervélo TestTeam) s.t.
  - General Classification: (1) Fabian Cancellara (SUI) (Team Saxo Bank) 4h 48' 32" (2) Ciolek + 8" (3) Tom Boonen (BEL) (Quick-Step) + 9"

==== Field hockey ====
- Men's EuroHockey Nations Championship in Amstelveen, Netherlands:
  - Fifth to eighth place classification:
    - Austria 5–4 Poland
    - Belgium 7–0 France
      - Standings: Belgium 9 points, France 6, Austria 3, Poland 0.
        - Austria and Poland are relegated to EuroHockey Nations Trophy in 2011.
  - Third and fourth place:
    - (bronze) Netherlands 6–1 Spain
  - Final:
    - (gold) England 5–3 (silver) Germany
      - England win the title for the first time.

==== Football (soccer) ====
- Women's Euro in Finland: (teams in **bold** advance to the quarterfinals)
  - Group B:
    - **Germany** 1–0 Iceland
    - **Norway** 1–1 **France**
      - Standings: Germany 9 points, France, Norway 4, Iceland 0.
- CAF Champions League group stage, round 4:
  - Group A:
    - ZESCO United (Zambia) 0–0 (Sudan) Al-Merreikh
    - Kano Pillars (Nigeria) 2–1 (Sudan) Al-Hilal
      - Standings: Al-Hilal, Kano Pillars 7 points, ZESCO United 5, Al-Merreikh 2.

==== Golf ====
- PGA Tour:
  - FedEx Cup Playoffs:
    - The Barclays in Jersey City, New Jersey
      - Winner: Heath Slocum (USA) 275 (−9)
- European Tour:
  - Johnnie Walker Championship at Gleneagles in Auchterarder, Scotland
    - Winner: Peter Hedblom (SWE) 275 (−13)
- LPGA Tour:
  - Safeway Classic in North Plains, Oregon
    - Winner: M. J. Hur (KOR) 203 (−13) PO
      - Hur wins her first LPGA tour title, eliminating Michele Redman (USA) on the first playoff hole and Suzann Pettersen (NOR) on the second.
- U.S. Amateur in Tulsa, Oklahoma:
  - An Byeong-hun (KOR) becomes the youngest person ever to win the event, at age 17.

==== Judo ====
- World Championships in Rotterdam:
  - Men's 100 kg: (gold) Maxim Rakov (KAZ) (silver) Henk Grol (NED) (bronze) Ramadan Darwish (EGY) & Takamasa Anai (JPN)
  - Men's +100 kg: (gold) Teddy Riner (FRA) (silver) Óscar Brayson (CUB) (bronze) Abdullo Tangriev (UZB) & Marius Paskevicius (LIT)
  - Women's +78 kg: (gold) Tong Wen (CHN) (silver) Karina Bryant (GBR) (bronze) Idalys Ortiz (CUB) & Maki Tsukada (JPN)

==== Motorcycle racing ====
- Moto GP:
  - Indianapolis Grand Prix in Speedway, Indiana, United States:
    - (1) Jorge Lorenzo (ESP) (Yamaha) 47:13.592 (2) Alex de Angelis (SMR) (Honda) +9.435 (3) Nicky Hayden (USA) (Ducati) +12.947
      - Riders' standings (after 12 of 17 races): (1) Valentino Rossi (ITA) (Yamaha) 212 points (2) Lorenzo 187 (3) Casey Stoner (AUS) (Ducati) 150
      - Manufacturers' standings: (1) Yamaha 280 points (2) Honda 204 (3) Ducati 182

==== Rowing ====
- World Championships in Lake Malta, Poznań, Poland:
  - Men:
    - Lightweight double sculls: (gold) Storm Uru/Peter Taylor (NZL) 6:10.62 (silver) Jérémie Azou/Frédéric Dufour (FRA) 6:12.57 (bronze) Marcello Miani/Elia Luini (ITA) 6:15.08
    - Lightweight quad: (gold) Germany 5:50.77 (silver) Denmark 5:51.02 (bronze) Poland 5:52.70
    - Quadruple sculls: (gold) Poland 5:38.33 (silver) Australia 5:39.66 (bronze) Germany 5:39.85
    - Eight: (gold) Germany 5:24.13 (silver) Canada 5:27.15 (bronze) Netherlands 5:28.32
  - Women:
    - Lightweight double sculls: (gold) Christina Giazitzidou/Alexandra Tsiavou (GRE) 6:51.46 (silver) Magdalena Kemnitz/Agnieszka Renc (POL) 6:56.65 (bronze) Hester Goodsell/Sophie Hosking (GBR) 6:56.67
    - Quadruple sculls: (gold) Ukraine 6:18.41 (silver) United States 6:21.54 (bronze) Germany 6:24.27
    - Eight: (gold) United States 6:05.34 (silver) Romania 6:06.94 (bronze) Netherlands 6:07.43

=== August 29, 2009 (Saturday) ===
==== Auto racing ====
- IndyCar Series:
  - Peak Antifreeze & Motor Oil Indy 300 in Joliet, Illinois:
    - (1) Ryan Briscoe (AUS) (Penske Racing) (2) Scott Dixon (NZL) (Chip Ganassi Racing) (3) Mario Moraes (BRA) (KV Racing)
      - Drivers' standings (after 15 of 17 races): (1) Briscoe 550 points (2) Dario Franchitti (GBR) (Chip Ganassi Racing) 525 (3) Dixon 517

==== Basketball ====
- Americas Championship in San Juan, Puerto Rico: (teams in **bold** advance to the quarterfinals)
  - Group A:
    - **Mexico** 80–63 Virgin Islands
    - **Canada** 69–71 **Uruguay**
      - Standings: Puerto Rico 6 points (3 games), Uruguay, Canada 5 (3), Mexico 4 (3), Virgin Islands 4 (4).
  - Group B:
    - **Dominican Republic** 78–73 Venezuela
    - Panama 55–80 Argentina
      - Standings: Brazil 6 points (3 matches), Dominican Republic 5 (3), Venezuela 5 (4), Argentina, Panama 4 (3).

==== Cricket ====
- New Zealand in Sri Lanka:
  - 2nd Test in Colombo, day 4:
    - Sri Lanka 416 & 311/5d (Kumar Sangakkara 109); New Zealand 234 & 182/6 (56.0 ov). New Zealand require another 312 runs with 4 wickets remaining.

==== Cycling ====
- Vuelta a España:
  - Stage 1 – Assen (Netherlands), 4.5 km (ITT): (1) Fabian Cancellara (SUI) (Team Saxo Bank) 5' 28" (2) Tom Boonen (BEL) (Quick-Step) + 9" (3) Tyler Farrar (USA) (Garmin–Slipstream) + 12"

==== Field hockey ====
- Women's EuroHockey Nations Championship in Amstelveen, Netherlands:
  - Fifth to eighth place classification:
    - Russia 1–1 Ireland
    - Azerbaijan 3–1 Scotland
      - Standings: Ireland 5 points, Azerbaijan 4, Russia 3, Scotland 2.
      - Russia and Scotland are relegated to EuroHockey Nations Trophy in 2011.
  - Third and fourth place:
    - Spain 1–2 (bronze) England
  - Final:
    - (gold) Netherlands 3–2 (silver) Germany
      - Netherlands win the title for the seventh time.

==== Football (soccer) ====
- Women's Euro in Finland: (teams in **bold** advance to the quarterfinals)
  - Group A:
    - **Finland** 0–1 Ukraine
    - Denmark 1–2 **Netherlands**
      - Standings: Finland, Netherlands 6 points, Denmark, Ukraine 3.
- CAF Champions League group stage, round 4:
  - Group B:
    - Monomotapa United (Zimbabwe) 0–2 (Democratic Republic of the Congo) TP Mazembe
    - Étoile du Sahel (Tunisia) 0–0 (Nigeria) Heartland
      - Standings: TP Mazembe 9 points, Heartland 7, ES Sahel 4, Monomotapa 3.
- Nehru Cup in New Delhi:
  - India 0–1 Syria
    - Standings: Syria 12 points (4 matches), India 6 (4), Kyrgyzstan, Lebanon 4 (4), Sri Lanka 3 (4).
      - Syria and India advance to the final.

==== Judo ====
- World Championships in Rotterdam:
  - Men's 90 kg: (gold) Lee Kyu-Won (KOR) (silver) Kirill Denisov (RUS) (bronze) Hesham Mesbah (EGY) & Dilshod Choriev (UZB)
  - Women's 70 kg: (gold) Yuri Alvear (COL) (silver) Anett Meszaros (HUN) (bronze) Mina Watanabe (JPN) & Houda Miled (TUN)
  - Women's 78 kg: (gold) Marhinde Verkerk (NED) (silver) Marina Pryschepa (UKR) (bronze) Heide Wollert (GER) & Yi Sun (CHN)

==== Rugby union ====
- Tri Nations Series:
  - Australia 25–32 South Africa in Perth
    - Standings after 4 matches: South Africa 17 points, New Zealand 8, Australia 3.

==== Shooting ====
- World Running Target Championships in Heinola, Finland:
  - Men's 50 metre running target: (gold) Maxim Stepanov (RUS) 596 **EWR** (silver) Krister Holmberg (FIN) 590 (bronze) Peter Pelach (SVK) 589

==== Tennis ====
- ATP World Tour:
  - Pilot Pen Tennis in New Haven, Connecticut, United States:
    - **Fernando Verdasco (ESP)** def. Sam Querrey (USA) 6–4, 7–6 (6)
      - Verdasco wins his first title of the year and third of his career.
- WTA Tour:
  - Pilot Pen Tennis in New Haven, Connecticut, United States:
    - **Caroline Wozniacki (DEN)** def. Elena Vesnina (RUS) 6–2, 6–4
      - Wozniacki wins her second consecutive title at this tournament, for her third title of the year, and the sixth of her career.

=== August 28, 2009 (Friday) ===
==== Athletics ====
- Golden League:
  - Weltklasse Zürich in Zürich, Switzerland: (GL indicates Golden League event, athletes in **bold** are in contention for the US$1 million jackpot)
    - Men:
      - 100 Metres GL: (gold) Usain Bolt (JAM) 9.81
      - 400 Metres GL: (gold) LaShawn Merritt (USA) 44.21
      - 800 Metres: (gold) David Rudisha (KEN) 1:43.52
      - 1500 Metres: (gold) Augustine Kiprono Choge (KEN) 3:33.38
      - 5000 Metres GL: (gold) **Kenenisa Bekele** (ETH) 12:52.32
      - 3000 Metres Steeplechase: (gold) Ezekiel Kemboi (KEN) 8:04.44
      - 110 Metres Hurdles GL: (gold) Dwight Thomas (JAM) 13.16
      - Triple Jump: (gold) Nelson Évora (POR) 17.38
      - Javelin Throw GL: (gold) Andreas Thorkildsen (NOR) 91.28
      - 4x100 Metres Relay: (gold) Jamaica 37.70
    - Women:
      - 100 Metres GL: (gold) Carmelita Jeter (USA) 10.86
      - 400 Metres GL: (gold) **Sanya Richards** (USA) 48.94
      - 1500 Metres: (gold) Maryam Yusuf Jamal (BHR) 3:59.15
      - 100 Metres Hurdles GL: (gold) Brigitte Foster-Hylton (JAM) 12.46
      - High Jump GL: (gold) Blanka Vlašić (CRO) 2.01
      - Pole Vault GL: (gold) **Elena Isinbaeva** (RUS) 5.06 (WR)
        - Isinbayeva sets a world record for the 17th time.

==== Basketball ====
- Americas Championship in San Juan, Puerto Rico: (teams in **bold** advance to the quarterfinals)
  - Group A:
    - Virgin Islands 67–87 **Canada**
    - Uruguay 54–71 **Puerto Rico**
      - Standings: Puerto Rico 6 points (3 games), Canada 4 (2), Uruguay 3 (2), Virgin Islands 3 (3), Mexico 2 (2)
  - Group B:
    - Argentina 67–76 **Brazil**
    - Venezuela 71–80 Panama
      - Standings: Brazil 6 points (3 matches), Venezuela 4 (3), Dominican Republic, Panama 3 (2), Argentina 2 (2).

==== Cricket ====
- New Zealand in Sri Lanka:
  - 2nd Test in Colombo, day 3:
    - Sri Lanka 416 & 157/2 (45.2 ov); New Zealand 234. Sri Lanka lead by 339 runs with 8 wickets remaining.
- Australia in England:
  - Scotland v Australia in Edinburgh:
    - Australia 345 (50 ov, David Hussey 111); Scotland 156 (39.3 ov). **Australia win by 189 runs**.

==== Field hockey ====
- Men's EuroHockey Nations Championship in Amstelveen, Netherlands:
  - Fifth to eighth place classification:
    - Austria 2–3 France
    - Belgium 5–0 Poland
      - Standings: Belgium, France 6 points, Austria, Poland 0.
      - Austria and Poland are relegated to EuroHockey Nations Trophy in 2011.
  - Semifinals:
    - England 2–1(ET) Netherlands
    - Germany 2–1 Spain

==== Football (soccer) ====
- Women's Euro in Finland: (teams in **bold** advance to the quarterfinals)
  - Group C:
    - Italy 0–2 **Sweden**
    - England 3–2 Russia
      - Standings: Sweden 6 points, Italy, England 3, Russia 0.
- UEFA Super Cup in Monaco:
  - Barcelona (Spain) 1–0 (ET) (Ukraine) Shakhtar Donetsk
    - Pedro scores the goal in the 115th minute.
- Nehru Cup in New Delhi:
  - Sri Lanka 1–4 Kyrgyzstan
    - Standings: Syria 9 points (3 matches), India 6 (3), Kyrgyzstan, Lebanon 4 (4), Sri Lanka 3 (4).
    - Syria and India advance to the final.

==== Judo ====
- World Championships in Rotterdam:
  - Men's 81 kg: (gold) Ivan Nifontov (RUS) (silver) Siarhei Shundzikau (BLR) (bronze) Kim Jae-Bum (KOR) & Ole Bischof (GER)
  - Women's 63 kg: (gold) Yoshie Ueno (JPN) (silver) Elisabeth Willeboordse (NED) (bronze) Claudia Malzahn (GER) & Alice Schlesinger (ISR)

=== August 27, 2009 (Thursday) ===
==== Basketball ====
- Americas Championship in San Juan, Puerto Rico: (teams in **bold** advance to the quarterfinals)
  - Group A:
    - Canada 95–40 Mexico
    - **Puerto Rico** 85–74 Virgin Islands
      - Standings: Puerto Rico 4 points (2 games), Canada, Uruguay 2 (1), Virgin Islands, Mexico 2 (2)
  - Group B:
    - Panama 87–100 Dominican Republic
    - Brazil 87–67 Venezuela
      - Standings: Brazil 4 points (2 games), Dominican Republic, Venezuela 3 (2), Panama, Argentina 1 (1).
- EuroBasket qualification additional qualifying round, final series first leg:
  - Belgium 70–66 France

==== Cricket ====
- New Zealand in Sri Lanka:
  - 2nd Test in Colombo, day 2:
    - Sri Lanka 416 (Thilan Samaraweera 143); New Zealand 159/5 (47.0 ov). New Zealand trail by 257 runs with 5 wickets remaining in the 1st innings.
- England in Ireland:
  - Only ODI in Belfast:
    - England 203/9 (50.0 ov); Ireland 113/9 (20.0/20 ov). **England win by 2 runs (D/L method)**.

==== Field hockey ====
- Women's EuroHockey Nations Championship in Amstelveen, Netherlands:
  - Fifth to eighth place classification:
    - Russia 1–1 Scotland
    - Azerbaijan 1–2 Ireland
      - Standings: Ireland 4 points, Russia, Scotland 2, Azerbaijan 1.
  - Semifinals:
    - Netherlands 5–1 Spain
    - England 1–2(ET) Germany

==== Football (soccer) ====
- Women's Euro in Finland: (teams in **bold** advance to the quarterfinals)
  - Group B:
    - France 1–5 Germany
    - Iceland 0–1 **Norway**
      - Standings: Germany 6 points, France, Norway 3, Iceland 0.
- Copa Sudamericana First Stage, second leg: (first leg score in parentheses)
  - **Emelec** (Ecuador) 2–1 (1–0) (Venezuela) Zamora. Emelec win 3–1 on aggregate.
  - **River Plate** (Uruguay) 2–1 (3–0) (Bolivia) Blooming. River Plate win 5–1 on aggregate.
- CONCACAF Champions League group stage, round 2:
  - Group 4:
    - W Connection (Trinidad and Tobago) 1–2 (Guatemala) Comunicaciones
    - Real España (Honduras) 1–5 (Mexico) UNAM
- Nehru Cup in New Delhi:
  - **Syria** 1–0 Lebanon
    - Standings: Syria 9 points (3 matches), India 6 (3), Lebanon 4 (4), Sri Lanka 3 (3), Kyrgyzstan 1 (3).
    - Syria advance to the final.

==== Judo ====
- World Championships in Rotterdam:
  - Men's 73 kg: (gold) Wang Ki-chun (KOR) (silver) Kim Chol Su (PRK) (bronze) Mansur Isaev (RUS) & Dirk Van Tichelt (BEL)
  - Women's 52 kg: (gold) Misato Nakamura (JPN) (silver) Yanet Bermoy (CUB) (bronze) Ana Carrascosa (ESP) & Romy Tarangul (GER)
  - Women's 57 kg: (gold) Morgane Ribout (FRA) (silver) Telma Monteiro (POR) (bronze) Kifayat Gasimova (AZE) Hedvig Karakas (HUN)

==== Shooting ====
- World Running Target Championships in Heinola, Finland:
  - Men's 50 metre running target mixed: (gold) Maxim Stepanov (RUS) 392+37 (silver) Staffan Holmström (FIN) 392+36 (bronze) Niklas Bergström (SWE) 391

=== August 26, 2009 (Wednesday) ===
==== Basketball ====
- Americas Championship in San Juan, Puerto Rico:
  - Group A:
    - Virgin Islands 62–88 Uruguay
    - Mexico 66–81 Puerto Rico
  - Group B:
    - Dominican Republic 68–81 Brazil
    - Venezuela 85–69 Argentina

==== Cricket ====
- New Zealand in Sri Lanka:
  - 2nd Test in Colombo, day 1:
    - Sri Lanka 262/3 (90.0 ov)
      - Daniel Vettori gets his 300th Test wicket.
- ICC Intercontinental Cup:
  - Netherlands v Afghanistan in Amstelveen, day 3:
    - Netherlands 181 & 132; Afghanistan 107 & 209/9 (89.3 ov; Edgar Schiferli 5/57). **Afghanistan win by 1 wicket**.
      - Standings (2 matches unless stated otherwise): Scotland 29 points, Kenya, Afghanistan 23, Netherlands 15, Ireland 12, Zimbabwe XI 3 (1), Canada 3 (3).

==== Field hockey ====
- Men's EuroHockey Nations Championship in Amstelveen, Netherlands: (teams in **bold** advance to the semifinals)
  - Pool A:
    - Belgium 2–8 **England**
    - **Germany** 3–1 Austria
      - Standings: England, Germany 7 points, Belgium 3, Austria 0.
  - Pool B:
    - **Spain** 6–1 Poland
    - France 0–6 **Netherlands**
      - Standings: Spain 9 points, Netherlands 6, France 3, Poland 0.

==== Football (soccer) ====
- Women's Euro in Finland: (teams in **bold** advance to the quarterfinals)
  - Group A:
    - Ukraine 1–2 Denmark
    - Netherlands 1–2 **Finland**
      - Standings: Finland 6 points, Netherlands, Denmark 3, Ukraine 0.
- UEFA Champions League Play-off round, second leg: (first leg score in parentheses, the winners advance to the group stage, the losers go to Europa League group stage)
  - Champions Path:
    - **Olympiacos** (Greece) 1–0 (2–0) (Moldova) Sheriff Tiraspol. Olympiacos win 3–0 on aggregate.
    - **APOEL** (Cyprus) 3–1 (0–1) (Denmark) Copenhagen. APOEL win 3–2 on aggregate.
  - Non-Champions Path:
    - **Arsenal** (England) 3–1 (2–0) (Scotland) Celtic. Arsenal win 5–1 on aggregate.
    - **Stuttgart** (Germany) 0–0 (2–0) (Romania) Timişoara. Stuttgart win 2–0 on aggregate.
    - **Fiorentina** (Italy) 1–1 (2–2) (Portugal) Sporting CP. 3–3 on aggregate, Fiorentina win on away goals rule.
- Copa Sudamericana First Stage, first leg:
  - Atlético Mineiro (Brazil) 1–1 (Brazil) Goiás
- Copa Sudamericana First Stage, second leg: (first leg score in parentheses)
  - Flamengo (Brazil) 1–1 (0–0) (Brazil) **Fluminense** 1–1 on aggregate, Fluminense win on away goals rule.
- CONCACAF Champions League group stage, round 2:
  - Group 1:
    - Árabe Unido (Panama) 1–1 (United States) Houston Dynamo
  - Group 2:
    - D.C. United (United States) 1–3 (Mexico) Toluca
    - Marathón (Honduras) 3–1 (Trinidad and Tobago) San Juan Jabloteh
  - Group 3:
    - Cruz Azul (Mexico) 5–0 (United States) Columbus Crew
- Nehru Cup in New Delhi:
  - India 3–1 Sri Lanka
    - Standings: Syria 6 points (2 matches), India 6 (3), Lebanon 4 (3), Sri Lanka 3 (3), Kyrgyzstan 1 (3).
- News:
  - The Italian football system will be shaken up as Serie A will break away from the system to form a new league akin to England's Premier League for the 2010–11 campaign, citing higher television rights as the main reason.

==== Judo ====
- World Championships in Rotterdam:
  - Men's 60 kg: (gold) Georgii Zantaraia (UKR) (silver) Hiroaki Hiraoka (JPN) (bronze) Hovhannes Davtyan (ARM) & Elio Verde (ITA)
  - Men's 66 kg: (gold) Khashbaataryn Tsagaanbaatar (MGL) (silver) Sugoi Uriarte (ESP) (bronze) Miklós Ungvari (HUN) & An Jeong-Hwan (KOR)
  - Women's 48 kg: (gold) Tomoko Fukumi (JPN) (silver) Oiana Blanco (ESP) (bronze) Chung Jung-Yeon (KOR) & Frédérique Jossinet (FRA)

==== Shooting ====
- World Running Target Championships in Heinola, Finland:
  - Men's 10 metre running target:
    - Gold medal match: Emil Martinsson (SWE) def. Vladyslav Prianishnikov (UKR) 6–2
    - Bronze medal match: Dimitry Romanov (RUS) def. Krister Holmberg (FIN) 6–3
  - Women's 10 metre running target:
    - Gold medal match: Galina Avramenko (UKR) def. Tetyana Yevseyenko (UKR) 6–5
    - Bronze medal match: Viktoriya Zabolotna (UKR) def. Olga Stepanova (RUS) 6–4

=== August 25, 2009 (Tuesday) ===
==== Basketball ====
- Oceanian Championship, second leg: (first leg score in parentheses)
  - **New Zealand** 100–78 (77–84) Australia. New Zealand win 177–162 on aggregate.
    - Both teams qualify for 2010 FIBA World Championship.

==== Cricket ====
- ICC Intercontinental Cup:
  - Netherlands v Afghanistan in Amstelveen, day 2:
    - Netherlands 181 & 132; Afghanistan 107 & 39/2 (18.0 ov). Afghanistan require another 168 runs with 8 wickets remaining.

==== Cycling ====
- UCI ProTour:
  - Tour of Benelux:
    - Stage 7 (ITT): (1) Edvald Boasson Hagen (NOR) (Team Columbia–HTC) 16' 07" (2) Sebastian Langeveld (NED) (Rabobank) + 4" (3) Maarten Tjallingii (NED) (Rabobank) + 5"
    - Final General classification: (1) Hagen 26h 49' 40" (2) Sylvain Chavanel (FRA) (Quick-Step) + 45" (3) Langeveld + 47"

==== Field hockey ====
- Women's EuroHockey Nations Championship in Amstelveen, Netherlands: (teams in **bold** advance to the semifinals)
  - Pool A:
    - Azerbaijan 1–4 **England**
    - **Netherlands** 9–0 Russia
      - Standings: Netherlands 9 points, England 6, Russia, Azerbaijan 1.
  - Pool B:
    - Ireland 1–4 **Spain**
    - **Germany** 4–0 Scotland
      - Standings: Germany 9 points, Spain 6, Scotland, Ireland 1.

==== Football (soccer) ====
- Women's Euro in Finland:
  - Group C:
    - England 1–2 Italy
    - Sweden 3–0 Russia
- UEFA Champions League Play-off round, second leg: (first leg score in parentheses, the winners advance to the group stage, the losers go to Europa League group stage)
  - Champions Path:
    - **Maccabi Haifa** (Israel) 3–0 (2–1) (Austria) Red Bull Salzburg. Maccabi Haifa win 5–1 on aggrehate.
    - **Zürich** (Switzerland) 2–1 (3–0) (Latvia) Ventspils. Zürich win 5–1 on aggregate.
    - **Debrecen** (Hungary) 2–0 (2–1) (Bulgaria) Levski Sofia. Debrecen win 4–1 on aggregate.
  - Non-Champions Path:
    - Anderlecht (Belgium) 1–3 (1–5) (France) **Lyon**. Lyon win 8–2 on aggregate.
    - **Atlético Madrid** (Spain) 2–0 (3–2) (Greece) Panathinaikos. Atlético Madrid win 5–2 on aggregate.
- UEFA Europa League play-off round, second leg: (first leg score in parentheses, the winners advance to the group stage)
  - **Shakhtar Donetsk** (Ukraine) 2–0 (3–0) (Turkey) Sivasspor. Shakhtar win 5–0 on aggregate.
- Copa Sudamericana First Stage, second leg: (first leg score in parentheses)
  - **Unión Española** (Chile) 1–0 (2–2) (Colombia) La Equidad. Unión Española win 3–2 on aggregate.
  - Coritiba (Brazil) 2–0 (0–2) (Brazil) **Vitória**. 2–2 on aggregate, Vitória win 5–3 in penalty shootout.
  - Libertad (Paraguay) 1–1 (0–1) (Ecuador) **LDU Quito**. LDU Quito win 2–1 on aggregate.
- CONCACAF Champions League group stage, round 2:
  - Group 1:
    - Pachuca (Mexico) 5–0 (El Salvador) Isidro Metapán
  - Group 3:
    - Saprissa (Costa Rica) 3–1 Puerto Rico Islanders
- Nehru Cup in New Delhi:
  - Kyrgyzstan 1–1 Lebanon
    - Standings: Syria 6 points (2 matches), Lebanon 4 (3), India, Sri Lanka 3 (2), Kyrgyzstan 1 (3).

=== August 24, 2009 (Monday) ===
==== Cricket ====
- ICC Intercontinental Cup:
  - Netherlands v Afghanistan in Amstelveen, day 1:
    - Netherlands 181; Afghanistan 107 (36.5 ov). Afghanistan trail by 74 runs after the 1st innings.

==== Cycling ====
- UCI ProTour:
  - Tour of Benelux:
    - Stage 6: (1) Edvald Boasson Hagen (NOR) (Team Columbia–HTC) 3h 28' 58" (2) Matthew Goss (AUS) (Team Saxo Bank) s.t. (3) Tyler Farrar (USA) (Garmin–Slipstream) s.t.
    - General classification: (1) Boasson Hagen 26h 33' 33" (2) Farrar + 21" (3) Lars Bak (DEN) (Team Saxo Bank) + 25"

==== Field hockey ====
- Men's EuroHockey Nations Championship in Amstelveen, Netherlands:
  - Pool A:
    - Belgium 3–0 Austria
    - Germany 4–4 England
      - Standings after 2 matches: Germany, England 4 points, Belgium 3, Austria 0.
  - Pool B:
    - Poland 2–3 France
    - Netherlands 0–3 **Spain**
      - Standings after 2 matches: Spain 6 points, Netherlands, France 3, Poland 0.

==== Football (soccer) ====
- Women's Euro in Finland:
  - Group B:
    - Germany 4–0 Norway
    - Iceland 1–3 France
- Nehru Cup in New Delhi:
  - Syria 4–0 Sri Lanka
    - Standings after 2 matches: Syria 6 points, Lebanon, India, Sri Lanka 3, Kyrgyzstan 0.

==== Shooting ====
- World Running Target Championships in Heinola, Finland:
  - Men's 10 metre running target mixed: (gold) Dimitry Romanov (RUS) 388 (silver) Miroslav Januš (CZE) 387 (bronze) Maxim Stepanov (RUS) 384
  - Women's 10 metre running target mixed: (gold) Natalya Gurova (KAZ) 376 (silver) Viktoriya Zabolotna (UKR) 375 (bronze) Olga Stepanova (RUS) 373

=== August 23, 2009 (Sunday) ===
==== Athletics ====
- World Championships in Berlin, Germany:
  - Women's Marathon: (gold) Bai Xue (CHN) 2:25:15 (silver) Yoshimi Ozaki (JPN) 2:25:25 (bronze) Aselefech Mergia (ETH) 2:25:32
  - Women's long jump: (gold) Brittney Reese (USA) 7.10 (silver) Tatyana Lebedeva (RUS) 6.97 (bronze) Karin Mey Melis (TUR) 6.80
  - Men's javelin throw: (gold) Andreas Thorkildsen (NOR) 89.59 (silver) Guillermo Martinez (CUB) 86.41 (bronze) Yukifumi Murakami (JPN) 82.97
  - Men's 5000 metres: (gold) Kenenisa Bekele (ETH) 13:17.09 (silver) Bernard Lagat (USA) 13:17.33 (bronze) James Kwalia C'Kurui (QAT) 13:17.78
    - Bekele wins his second title of this championships and fifth overall.
  - Women's 1500 metres: (gold) Maryam Yusuf Jamal (BHR) 4:03.74 (silver) Lisa Dobriskey (GBR) 4:03.75 (bronze) Shannon Rowbury (USA) 4:04.18
    - Jamal wins her second 1500m title after the initial winner Natalia Rodríguez (ESP) is disqualified.
  - Men's 800 metres: (gold) Mbulaeni Mulaudzi (RSA) 1:45.29 (silver) Alfred Kirwa Yego (KEN) 1:45.35 (bronze) Yusuf Saad Kamel (BHR) 1:45.35
  - Women's 4 × 400 metres relay: (gold) United States 3:17.83 (silver) Jamaica 3:21.15 (bronze) Russia 3:21.64
  - Men's 4 × 400 metres relay: (gold) United States 2:57.86 (silver) United Kingdom 3:00.53 (bronze) Australia 3:00.90

==== Auto racing ====
- Formula One:
  - European Grand Prix in Valencia, Spain
    - (1) Rubens Barrichello (BRA) (Brawn–Mercedes) 1:35:51.289 (2) Lewis Hamilton (GBR) (McLaren-Mercedes) +2.358 (3) Kimi Räikkönen (FIN) (Ferrari) +15.994
      - Drivers' standings (after 11 of 17 races): (1) Jenson Button (GBR) (Brawn-Mercedes) 72 points (2) Barrichello 54 (3) Mark Webber (AUS) (Red Bull–Renault) 51.5
      - Constructors' standings: (1) Brawn-Mercedes 126 (2) Red Bull-Renault 98.5 (3) Ferrari 46
- IndyCar Series:
  - Peak Antifreeze & Motor Oil Indy Grand Prix in Sonoma, California
    - (1) Dario Franchitti (GBR) (Chip Ganassi Racing) (2) Ryan Briscoe (AUS) (Penske Racing) (3) Mike Conway (GBR) (Dreyer & Reinbold Racing)
      - Drivers' standings (after 14 of 17 races): (1) Briscoe 497 points (2) Franchitti 493 (3) Scott Dixon (NZL) (Chip Ganassi Racing) 477
- V8 Supercars:
  - Queensland House and Land.com 300 in Ipswich, Queensland
    - Round 16: (1) Will Davison (AUS) (Holden Commodore) (2) Craig Lowndes (AUS) (Ford Falcon) (3) Russell Ingall (AUS) (Holden Commodore)
      - Standings (after 13 of 26 races): (1) Jamie Whincup (AUS) (Ford Falcon) 2007 points (2) Davison 1824 (3) Garth Tander (AUS) (Holden Commodore) 1479

==== Basketball ====
- Oceanian Championship, first leg:
  - Australia 84–77 New Zealand

==== Cricket ====
- Australia in England:
  - The Ashes Series:
    - 5th Test at The Oval, London, day 4:
      - England 332 & 373/9d; Australia 160 & 348 (102.2 ov, Michael Hussey 121). **England win by 197 runs and win the 5-Test series 2–1.**
- Kenya in Canada:
  - 3rd ODI in King City, Ontario:
    - **Match abandoned without a ball bowled. Canada win the 3-match series 1–0.**
- Ireland in Scotland:
  - 2nd ODI in Aberdeen:
    - **Match abandoned without a ball bowled. Ireland win the 2-match series 1–0.**

==== Cycling ====
- UCI ProTour:
  - Tour of Benelux:
    - Stage 5: (1) Lars Bak (DEN) (Team Saxo Bank) 5h 13' 16" (2) Edvald Boasson Hagen (NOR) (Team Columbia–HTC) + 2" (3) Francesco Gavazzi (ITA) (Lampre–NGC) s.t.
    - General classification: (1) Hagen 23h 04' 45" (2) Tyler Farrar (USA) (Garmin–Slipstream) + 15" (3) Bak + 15"
  - GP Ouest-France:
    - (1) Simon Gerrans (AUS) (Cervelo Test Team) 5h 58' 53" (2) Pierrick Fédrigo (FRA) (Bbox Bouygues Telecom) s.t. (3) Paul Martens (GER) (Rabobank) s.t.

==== Field hockey ====
- Men's EuroHockey Nations Championship in Amstelveen, Netherlands:
  - Pool A:
    - England 5–0 Austria
    - Germany 3–1 Belgium
- Women's EuroHockey Nations Championship in Amstelveen, Netherlands: (teams in **bold** advance to the semifinals)
  - Pool A:
    - **Netherlands** 5–0 England
    - Azerbaijan 1–1 Russia
  - Pool B:
    - Ireland 0–0 Scotland
    - **Germany** 2–1 Spain

==== Football (soccer) ====
- Women's Euro in Finland:
  - Group A:
    - Ukraine 0–2 Netherlands
    - Finland 1–0 Denmark
- Nehru Cup in New Delhi:
  - India 2–1 Kyrgyzstan
    - Standings: Syria, Sri Lanka 3 points (1 match), Lebanon, India 3 (2), Kyrgyzstan 0 (2)
- Spanish Super Cup, second leg: (first leg score in parentheses)
  - **Barcelona** 3–0 (2–1) Athletic Bilbao. Barcelona win 5–1 on aggregate.

==== Golf ====
- LPGA Tour:
  - Solheim Cup in Sugar Grove, Illinois, day 3:
    - Final Round (singles):
      - Paula Creamer (USA) defeats Suzann Pettersen (EUR) 3 & 2
      - Angela Stanford (USA) defeats Becky Brewerton (EUR) 5 & 4
      - Michelle Wie (USA) defeats Helen Alfredsson (EUR) 1 up
      - Laura Davies (EUR) and Brittany Lang (USA) halved
        - Lang comes back to halve the match after Davies was dormie with 2 holes left.
      - Gwladys Nocera (EUR) and Juli Inkster (USA) halved
      - Catriona Matthew (EUR) defeats Kristy McPherson (USA) 3 & 2
      - Brittany Lincicome (USA) defeats Sophie Gustafson (EUR) 3 & 2
      - Diana Luna (EUR) defeats Nicole Castrale (USA) 3 & 2
      - Christina Kim (USA) defeats Tania Elósegui (EUR) 2 up
      - Maria Hjorth (EUR) and Cristie Kerr (USA) halved
      - Morgan Pressel (USA) defeats Anna Nordqvist (EUR) 3 & 2
      - Janice Moodie (EUR) and Natalie Gulbis (USA) halved
        - Gulbis comes back from 3 down after 13 holes to earn a half-point.
    - Final standings: **Team USA** (United States) 16–12 Team Europe
    - Team USA win the Cup for the third straight meeting, and eighth time overall.
- Senior majors:
  - JELD-WEN Tradition in Sunriver, Oregon
    - (1) Mike Reid (USA) 272 (−16) PO (2) John Cook (USA) 272 (−16) (3) Brad Bryant (USA) 274 (−14)
      - Reid wins his second senior major on the first playoff hole.
- PGA Tour:
  - Wyndham Championship in Greensboro, North Carolina
    - Winner: Ryan Moore (USA) 264 (−16) PO
      - Moore wins his first title on the PGA Tour in a playoff, eliminating Jason Bohn (USA) on the first playoff hole and Kevin Stadler (USA) on the third.
- European Tour:
  - KLM Open in Zandvoort, Netherlands
    - Winner: Simon Dyson (ENG) 265 (−15) PO
      - Dyson defeats Peter Hedblom (SWE) and Peter Lawrie (IRL) on the first playoff hole.

==== Tennis ====
- ATP World Tour:
  - Western & Southern Financial Group Masters in Mason, Ohio, United States:
    - Final: **Roger Federer** (SUI) def. Novak Djokovic (SRB) 6–1, 7–5
      - Federer wins this tournament for the third time, for his fourth title of the year and 61st overall.
- WTA Tour:
  - Rogers Cup in Toronto, Canada:
    - Final: **Elena Dementieva** (RUS) def. Maria Sharapova (RUS) 6–4, 6–3
      - Dementieva wins her third title of the year and 14th of her career.

==== Volleyball ====
- FIVB World Grand Prix Final Round in Tokyo, Japan:
  - Germany 3–1 China
  - Russia 3–0 Netherlands
  - Japan 1–3 Brazil
    - Final standings: (gold) Brazil 10 points, (silver) Russia 9, (bronze) Germany 7, Netherlands 7, China 6, Japan 6.
      - Brazil win the title for the eighth time.

=== August 22, 2009 (Saturday) ===
==== Athletics ====
- World Championships in Berlin, Germany:
  - Men's Marathon: (gold) Abel Kirui (KEN) 2:06:54 (CR) (silver) Emmanuel Kipchirchir Mutai (KEN) 2:07:48 (bronze) Tsegay Kebede (ETH) 2:08:35
  - Men's long jump: (gold) Dwight Phillips (USA) 8.54 (silver) Godfrey Khotso Mokoena (RSA) 8.47 (bronze) Mitchell Watt (AUS) 8.37
  - Men's pole vault: (gold) Steven Hooker (AUS) 5.90 (silver) Romain Mesnil (FRA) 5.85 (bronze) Renaud Lavillenie (FRA) 5.80
  - Women's hammer throw: (gold) Anita Włodarczyk (POL) 77.96 WR (silver) Betty Heidler (GER) 77.12 NR (bronze) Martina Hrašnová (SVK) 74.79
    - Włodarczyk betters Tatyana Lysenko's record by 16 cm, and twists her ankle while celebrating.
  - Women's 5000 metres: (gold) Vivian Cheruiyot (KEN) 14:57.97 (silver) Sylvia Jebiwott Kibet (KEN) 14:58.33 (bronze) Meseret Defar (ETH) 14:58.41
  - Women's 4 × 100 metres relay: (gold) Jamaica 42.06 (silver) Bahamas 42.29 (bronze) Germany 42.87
  - Men's 4 × 100 metres relay: (gold) Jamaica 37.31 CR (silver) Trinidad and Tobago 37.62 NR (bronze) United Kingdom 38.02
    - Usain Bolt completes a hat-trick of world titles, but this time without a world record.

==== Auto racing ====
- Sprint Cup Series:
  - Sharpie 500 in Bristol, Tennessee
    - (1) Kyle Busch (Nevada) (Toyota, Joe Gibbs Racing) (2) Mark Martin (Arkansas) (Chevrolet, Hendrick Motorsports) (3) Marcos Ambrose (Australia) (Toyota, JTG Daugherty Racing)
      - Drivers' standings (after 24 of 26 races leading to the Chase for the Sprint Cup): (1) Tony Stewart (Indiana) 3564 points (Chevrolet, Stewart Haas Racing) (2) Jimmie Johnson (California) 3344 (Chevrolet, Hendrick Motorsports) (3) Jeff Gordon (California) 3310 (Chevrolet, Hendrick Motorsports)
      - One week after Stewart clinched his spot in the 2009 Chase, Johnson and Gordon join him.
- V8 Supercars:
  - Queensland House and Land.com 300 in Ipswich, Queensland
    - Round 15: (1) Jamie Whincup (AUS) (Ford Falcon) (2) James Courtney (AUS) (Ford Falcon) (3) Mark Winterbottom (AUS) (Ford Falcon)
      - Standings (after 13 of 26 races): (1) Whincup 1941 points (2) Will Davison (AUS) (Holden Commodore) 1674 (3) Garth Tander (AUS) (Holden Commodore) 1416

==== Cricket ====
- Australia in England:
  - The Ashes Series:
    - 5th Test at The Oval, London, day 3:
      - England 332 & 373/9d (Jonathan Trott 119); Australia 160 & 80/0 (20 ov). Australia require 466 runs with 10 wickets remaining.
- New Zealand in Sri Lanka:
  - 1st Test in Colombo, day 5:
    - Sri Lanka 452 & 259/4d; New Zealand 299 & 210 (71.5 ov). **Sri Lanka win by 202 runs, lead 2-match series 1–0.**
- Ireland in Scotland:
  - 1st ODI in Aberdeen:
    - Ireland 205/9 (50 ov); Scotland 109 (40.3 ov). **Ireland win by 96 runs, lead 2-match series 1–0.**
- Kenya in Canada:
  - 2nd ODI in King City, Ontario:
    - Canada 63/3 (17.1/33 ov). **No result, Canada lead 3-match series 1–0.**

==== Cycling ====
- UCI ProTour:
  - Tour of Benelux:
    - Stage 4: (1) Tyler Farrar (USA) (Garmin–Slipstream) 5h 27' 01" (2) Edvald Boasson Hagen (NOR) (Team Columbia–HTC) s.t. (3) Francesco Gavazzi (ITA) (Lampre–NGC) s.t.
    - General classification: (1) Farrar 17h 51' 13" (2) Tom Boonen (BEL) (Quick-Step) + 20" (3) Hagen + 23"

==== Field hockey ====
- Men's EuroHockey Nations Championship in Amstelveen, Netherlands:
  - Pool B:
    - Netherlands 9–0 Poland
    - Spain 3–0 France
- Women's EuroHockey Nations Championship in Amstelveen, Netherlands:
  - Pool A:
    - Netherlands 10–0 Azerbaijan
    - England 4–0 Russia
  - Pool B:
    - Spain 3–1 Scotland
    - Germany 7–0 Ireland

==== Football (soccer) ====
- Women's Professional Soccer Final in Carson, California
  - Los Angeles Sol 0–1 **Sky Blue FC**
- Nehru Cup in New Delhi:
  - Sri Lanka 4–3 Lebanon

==== Golf ====
- LPGA Tour:
  - Solheim Cup in Sugar Grove, Illinois, day 2:
    - Round 3 (Four-ball):
      - Christina Kim/Michelle Wie (USA) defeat Helen Alfredsson/Tania Elósegui (EUR) 5 & 4
      - Catriona Matthew/Diana Luna (EUR) and Angela Stanford/Brittany Lang (USA) halved
        - Matthew and Luna salvage a tie after trailing by 2 with 2 holes to play.
      - Suzann Pettersen/Anna Nordqvist (EUR) defeat Nicole Castrale/Cristie Kerr (USA) 2 up
      - Gwladys Nocera/Maria Hjorth (EUR) defeat Brittany Lincicome/Kristy McPherson (USA) 1 up
    - Standings after Round 3: Team USA (United States) 6–6 Team Europe
    - Round 4 (Foursome):
      - Janice Moodie/Sophie Gustafson (EUR) defeat Paula Creamer/Juli Inkster (USA) 4 & 3
      - Kristy McPherson/Morgan Pressel (USA) defeat Helen Alfredsson/Suzann Pettersen (EUR) 2 up
      - Becky Brewerton/Gwladys Nocera (EUR) defeat Natalie Gulbis/Christina Kim (USA) 5 & 4
      - Cristie Kerr/Michelle Wie (USA) defeat Anna Nordqvist/Maria Hjorth (EUR) 1 up
    - Standings after Round 4: Team USA (United States) 8–8 Team Europe
- Senior majors:
  - JELD-WEN Tradition in Sunriver, Oregon, third round:
    - Leaderboard: (1) Brad Bryant (USA) 201 (−15) (2) Mike Reid (USA) 203 (−13) (3) John Cook (USA) 204 (−12)

==== Rugby union ====
- Tri Nations Series:
  - Australia 18–19 New Zealand in Sydney
    - Standings: South Africa 12 points (3 matches), New Zealand 8 (4), Australia 2 (3).

==== Volleyball ====
- FIVB World Grand Prix Final Round in Tokyo, Japan:
  - Germany 1–3 Russia
  - Brazil 3–1 Netherlands
  - Japan 0–3 China
    - Standings after 4 matches: Brazil 8 points, Russia 7, Netherlands 6, China, Germany, Japan 5.

=== August 21, 2009 (Friday) ===
==== Athletics ====
- World Championships in Berlin, Germany:
  - Men's 50 kilometres walk: (gold) Sergey Kirdyapkin (RUS) 3:38:35 (silver) Trond Nymark (NOR) 3:41:16 (bronze) Jesus Angel Garcia (ESP) 3:41:37
  - Men's high jump: (gold) Yaroslav Rybakov (RUS) 2.32 (silver) Kyriakos Ioannou (CYP) 2.32 (bronze) Sylwester Bednarek (POL) & Raul Spank (GER) 2.32
  - Women's discus throw: (gold) Dani Samuels (AUS) 65.44 (silver) Yarelis Barrios (CUB) 65.31 (bronze) Nicoleta Grasu (ROU) 65.20
  - Women's 200 metres: (gold) Allyson Felix (USA) 22.02 (silver) Veronica Campbell Brown (JAM) 22.35 (bronze) Debbie Ferguson-McKenzie (BAH) 22.41
  - Men's 400 metres: (gold) LaShawn Merritt (USA) 44.06 (silver) Jeremy Wariner (USA) 44.60 (bronze) Renny Quow (TRI) 45.02

==== Auto racing ====
- Nationwide Series:
  - Food City 250 in Bristol, Tennessee
    - (1) David Ragan (Georgia (U.S. state)) (Ford, Roush Fenway Racing) (2) Carl Edwards (Missouri) (Ford, Roush Fenway Racing) (3) Brad Keselowski (Michigan) (Chevrolet, JR Motorsports)

==== Cricket ====
- Australia in England:
  - The Ashes Series:
    - 5th Test at The Oval, London, day 2:
      - England 332 & 58/3 (28 overs); Australia 160 (52.5 overs; Stuart Broad 5/37). England lead by 230 runs with 7 wickets left in the 2nd innings.
- New Zealand in Sri Lanka:
  - 1st Test in Colombo, day 4:
    - Sri Lanka 452 & 259/4d (Tillakaratne Dilshan 123*); New Zealand 299 & 30/1 (13.0 ov). New Zealand require another 383 runs with 9 wickets remaining.
- Kenya in Canada:
  - 2nd ODI in King City, Ontario:
    - **Match abandoned without a ball bowled, and will be rescheduled for August 22.**

==== Cycling ====
- UCI ProTour:
  - Tour of Benelux:
    - Stage 3: (1) Tom Boonen (BEL) (Quick-Step) 3h 43' 19" (2) Tyler Farrar (USA) (Garmin–Slipstream) s.t. (3) Francesco Chicchi (ITA) (Liquigas) s.t.
    - General classification: (1) Farrar 12h 24' 22" (2) Boonen + 10" (3) Edvald Boasson Hagen (NOR) (Team Columbia–HTC) + 19"

==== Football (soccer) ====
- Nehru Cup in New Delhi:
  - Sri Lanka – Lebanon postponed to August 22 due to heavy rain.

==== Golf ====
- LPGA Tour:
  - Solheim Cup in Sugar Grove, Illinois, day 1:
    - Round 1 (Four-ball):
      - Paula Creamer/Cristie Kerr (USA) defeat Suzann Pettersen/Sophie Gustafson (EUR) 1 up
      - Helen Alfredsson/Tania Elósegui (EUR) defeat Angela Stanford/Juli Inkster (USA) 1 up
      - Brittany Lang/Brittany Lincicome (USA) defeat Laura Davies/Becky Brewerton (EUR) 5 & 4
      - Catriona Matthew/Maria Hjorth (EUR) and Morgan Pressel/Michelle Wie (USA) halved
    - Standings after Round 1: Team USA (United States) 2½–1½ Team Europe
    - Round 2 (Foursome):
      - Christina Kim/Natalie Gulbis (USA) defeat Suzann Pettersen/Sophie Gustafson (EUR) 3 & 2
      - Becky Brewerton/Gwladys Nocera (EUR) defeat Angela Stanford/Nicole Castrale (USA) 3 & 1
      - Maria Hjorth/Anna Nordqvist (EUR) defeat Kristy McPherson/Brittany Lincicome (USA) 3 & 2
      - Paula Creamer/Juli Inkster (USA) defeat Catriona Matthew/Janice Moodie (EUR) 2 & 1
    - Standings after Round 2: Team USA (United States) 4½–3½ Team Europe
- Senior majors:
  - JELD-WEN Tradition in Sunriver, Oregon, second round:
    - Leaderboard: (1) Brad Bryant (USA) 134 (−10) (2) Fred Funk (USA) 135 (−9) (3) John Cook, Larry Mize & Loren Roberts (all United States) 136 (−8)

==== Volleyball ====
- FIVB World Grand Prix Final Round in Tokyo, Japan:
  - China 1–3 Russia
  - Brazil 3–0 Germany
  - Japan 3–0 Netherlands
    - Standings after 3 matches: Brazil 6 points, Russia, Netherlands 5, Japan, Germany 4, China 3.

=== August 20, 2009 (Thursday) ===
==== Athletics ====
- World Championships in Berlin, Germany:
  - Women's high jump: (gold) Blanka Vlašić (CRO) 2.04 (silver) Anna Chicherova (RUS) 2.02 (bronze) Ariane Friedrich (GER) 2.02
  - Women's 400 metres hurdles: (gold) Melaine Walker (JAM) 52.42 CR (silver) Lashinda Demus (USA) 52.96 (bronze) Josanne Lucas (TRI) 53.20 NR
    - Walker's time is the second fastest in history, just 0.08 off the world record.
  - Men's 200 metres: (gold) Usain Bolt (JAM) 19.19 WR (silver) Alonso Edward (PAN) 19.81 AR (bronze) Wallace Spearmon (USA) 19.85
    - Bolt gets his second world record, both by 0.11 seconds.
  - Men's 110 metres hurdles: (gold) Ryan Brathwaite (BAR) 13.14 NR (silver) Terrence Trammell (USA) 13.15 (bronze) David Payne (USA) 13.15
  - Men's decathlon: (gold) Trey Hardee (USA) 8790 points (silver) Leonel Suárez (CUB) 8640 (bronze) Aleksandr Pogorelov (RUS) 8528

==== Basketball ====
- EuroBasket qualification additional qualifying round:
  - Group A: Portugal 58–60 Belgium
    - Standings: Belgium, Bosnia & Herzegovina 7 points, Portugal 4.
  - Group B: Italy 89–95 Finland
    - Standings: France 7 points, Finland 6, Italy 5.
    - Belgium and France advance to the final series.

==== Cricket ====
- Australia in England:
  - The Ashes Series:
    - 5th Test at The Oval, London, day 1:
      - England 307/8 (85.3 ov)
- New Zealand in Sri Lanka:
  - 1st Test in Colombo, day 3:
    - Sri Lanka 452; New Zealand 281/8 (105.0 ov). New Zealand trail by 171 runs with 2 wickets remaining in the 1st innings.
- ICC Intercontinental Cup:
  - Scotland v Ireland in Aberdeen, day 4:
    - No play due to rain. Ireland 202 and 303; Scotland 208 and 72/5. **Match drawn.**
      - Standings: Scotland 29 points (2 matches), Kenya 23 (2), Ireland 12 (2), Afghanistan, Netherlands 9 (1), Zimbabwe XI 3 (1), Canada 3 (3).

==== Cycling ====
- UCI ProTour:
  - Tour of Benelux:
    - Stage 2: (1) Tyler Farrar (USA) (Garmin–Slipstream) 4hr 17' 53" (2) Yauheni Hutarovich (BLR) (Française des Jeux) s.t. (3) Edvald Boasson Hagen (NOR) (Team Columbia–HTC) s.t.
    - General classification: (1) Farrar 8hr 41' 09" (2) Hagen + 13" (3) Tom Boonen (BEL) (Quick-Step) + 14"

==== Football (soccer) ====
- CONCACAF Champions League group stage, round 1:
  - Group B:
    - San Juan Jabloteh (Trinidad and Tobago) 0–1 (Mexico) Toluca
  - Group D:
    - Real España (Honduras) 1–0 (Trinidad and Tobago) W Connection
- Copa Sudamericana First Stage, first leg:
  - Boca Juniors (Argentina) 1–1 (Argentina) Vélez Sarsfield
- Copa Sudamericana First Stage, second leg: (first leg score in parentheses)
  - **Cienciano** (Peru) 2–0 (0–0) (Uruguay) Liverpool. Cienciano win 2–0 on aggregate.
  - La Paz (Bolivia) 1–2 (0–2) (Paraguay) **Cerro Porteño**. Cerro Porteño win 4–1 on aggregate.
- Nehru Cup in New Delhi:
  - Syria 2–0 Kyrgyzstan

==== Golf ====
- Senior majors:
  - JELD-WEN Tradition in Sunriver, Oregon, first round:
    - Leaderboard: (1) Brad Bryant (USA) 62 (−10) (2) Loren Roberts (USA) 65 (−5) (3) Tom Lehman & Tom Watson (both United States) 67 (−3)

==== Volleyball ====
- FIVB World Grand Prix Final Round in Tokyo, Japan:
  - Netherlands 3–2 Germany
  - China 0–3 Brazil
  - Japan 1–3 Russia
    - Standings after 2 matches: Brazil, Netherlands 4 points, Russia, Germany 3, China, Japan 2.

=== August 19, 2009 (Wednesday) ===
==== Athletics ====
- World Championships in Berlin, Germany:
  - Men's discus throw: (gold) Robert Harting (GER) 69.43 (silver) Piotr Małachowski (POL) 69.15 NR (bronze) Gerd Kanter (EST) 66.88
    - Harting wins the title with his final throw.
  - Men's 1500 metres: (gold) Yusuf Saad Kamel (BHR) 3:35.93 (silver) Deresse Mekonnen (ETH) 3:36.01 (bronze) Bernard Lagat (USA) 3:36.20
    - Kamel's father Billy Konchellah is a two-times world champion.
  - Women's 100 metres hurdles: (gold) Brigitte Foster-Hylton (JAM) 12.51 (silver) Priscilla Lopes-Schliep (CAN) 12.54 (bronze) Delloreen Ennis-London (JAM) 12.55
  - Women's 800 metres: (gold) Caster Semenya (RSA) 1:55.45 (silver) Janeth Jepkosgei (KEN) 1:57.90 Jennifer Meadows (GBR) 1:57.93
  - Men's decathlon (standings after 5 events): (1) Oleksiy Kasyanov (UKR) 4555 points (2) Yunior Díaz (CUB) 4512 (3) Trey Hardee (USA) 4511

==== Cricket ====
- New Zealand in Sri Lanka:
  - 1st Test in Colombo, day 2:
    - (Sri Lanka) 452 (Mahela Jayawardene 114, Thilan Samaraweera 159); New Zealand 87/2 (29.0 ov). New Zealand trail by 365 runs with 8 wickets remaining in the 1st innings.
- Kenya in Canada:
  - 1st ODI in King City, Ontario:
    - Kenya 113 (33.1 ov); Canada 117/1 (16.2 ov). **Canada win by 9 wickets, lead 3-match series 1–0**.
- ICC Intercontinental Cup:
  - Zimbabwe XI v Afghanistan in Mutare, day 4:
    - Zimbabwe XI 350 & 446/9d (113.5 ov, Trevor Garwe 117); Afghanistan 427 & 211/4 (44.5 ov, Noor Ali 100*). **Match drawn**.
  - Scotland v Ireland in Aberdeen, day 3:
    - Ireland 202 & 303 (William Porterfield 118); Scotland 208 & 72/5 (31.0 ov). Scotland require another 226 runs with 5 wickets remaining.

==== Cycling ====
- UCI ProTour:
  - Tour of Benelux:
    - Stage 1: (1) Tyler Farrar (USA) (Garmin–Slipstream) 4h 18' 30" (2) Tom Boonen (BEL) (Quick-Step) s.t. (3) Edvald Boasson Hagen (NOR) (Team Columbia–HTC) s.t
    - General classification: (1) Farrar 4h 23' 26" (2) Boonen + 4" (3) Sylvain Chavanel (FRA) (Quick-Step) + 9"

==== Football (soccer) ====
- UEFA Champions League Play-off round, first leg:
  - Champions Path:
    - Red Bull Salzburg (Austria) 1–2 (Israel) Maccabi Haifa
    - Ventspils (Latvia) 0–3 (Switzerland) Zürich
    - Levski Sofia (Bulgaria) 1–2 (Hungary) Debrecen
  - Non-Champions Path:
    - Lyon (France) 5–1 (Belgium) Anderlecht
    - Panathinaikos (Greece) 2–3 (Spain) Atlético Madrid
- CONCACAF Champions League group stage, round 1:
  - Group A:
    - Houston Dynamo (United States) 1–0 (El Salvador) Isidro Metapán
    - Árabe Unido (Panama) 4–1 (Mexico) Pachuca
  - Group C:
    - Cruz Azul (Mexico) 2–0 (Costa Rica) Saprissa
- Copa Sudamericana First Stage, first leg:
  - River Plate (Argentina) 1–2 (Argentina) Lanús
- Women's Professional Soccer Playoffs Super Semifinal in Fenton, Missouri:
  - Saint Louis Athletica 0–1 **Sky Blue FC**
- Nehru Cup in New Delhi:
  - India 0–1 Lebanon

==== Volleyball ====
- FIVB World Grand Prix Final Round in Tokyo, Japan:
  - Netherlands 3–2 China
  - Brazil 3–2 Russia
  - Japan 1–3 Germany

=== August 18, 2009 (Tuesday) ===
==== American football ====
- After saying last month that he would probably retire, quarterback Brett Favre signs a two-year deal with the Minnesota Vikings for US$25 million. (ESPN)

==== Athletics ====
- World Championships in Berlin, Germany:
  - Men's triple jump: (gold) Phillips Idowu (GBR) 17.73 (silver) Nelson Évora (POR) 17.55 (bronze) Alexis Copello (CUB) 17.36
  - Women's javelin throw: (gold) Steffi Nerius (GER) 67.30 (silver) Barbora Špotáková (CZE) 66.42 (bronze) Maria Abakumova (RUS) 66.06
    - Thirty-seven-year-old Nerius becomes the oldest world champion in history.
  - Women's 400 metres: (gold) Sanya Richards (USA) 49.00 (silver) Shericka Williams (JAM) 49.32 (bronze) Antonina Krivoshapka (RUS) 49.71
  - Men's 3000 metres steeplechase: (gold) Ezekiel Kemboi (KEN) 8:00.43 CR (silver) Richard Kipkemboi Mateelong (KEN) 8:00.89 (bronze) Bouabdellah Tahri (FRA) 8:01.18 ER
  - Men's 400 metres hurdles: (gold) Kerron Clement (USA) 47.91 (silver) Javier Culson (PUR) 48.09 (bronze) Bershawn Jackson (USA) 48.23

==== Cricket ====
- New Zealand in Sri Lanka:
  - 1st Test in Colombo, day 1:
    - Sri Lanka 293/3 (78.0 ov, Mahela Jayawardene 108*)
- Bangladesh in Zimbabwe:
  - 5th ODI in Bulawayo:
    - Zimbabwe 209 (46.4 ov); Bangladesh 212/5 (47.5 ov). **Bangladesh win by 5 wickets, and win the 5-match series 4–1**.
- ICC Intercontinental Cup:
  - Zimbabwe XI v Afghanistan in Mutare, day 3:
    - Zimbabwe XI 350 & 267/6 (74.2 ov, Tatenda Taibu 120); Afghanistan 427 (Mohammad Nabi 102). Zimbabwe XI lead by 190 runs with 4 wickets remaining.
  - Scotland v Ireland in Aberdeen, day 2:
    - Ireland 202 & 102/3 (40.0 ov); Scotland 208 (Qasim Sheikh 100*). Ireland lead by 96 runs with 7 wickets remaining.

==== Cycling ====
- UCI ProTour:
  - Tour of Benelux:
    - Prologue: (1) Sylvain Chavanel (FRA) (Quick-Step) 4' 55" (2) Tyler Farrar (USA) (Garmin–Slipstream) + 1" (3) Tom Boonen (BEL) (Quick-Step) + 1"

==== Football (soccer) ====
- UEFA Champions League Play-off round, first leg:
  - Champions Path:
    - Sheriff Tiraspol (Moldova) 0–2 (Greece) Olympiacos
    - Copenhagen (Denmark) 1–0 (Cyprus) APOEL
  - Non-Champions Path:
    - Celtic (Scotland) 0–2 (England) Arsenal
    - Timişoara (Romania) 0–2 (Germany) Stuttgart
    - Sporting CP 2–2 (Portugal) (Italy) Fiorentina
- CONCACAF Champions League group stage, round 1:
  - Group B:
    - Marathón (Honduras) 3–1 (United States) D.C. United
  - Group C:
    - Columbus Crew (United States) 2–0 Puerto Rico Islanders
  - Group D:
    - UNAM (Mexico) 1–0 (Guatemala) Comunicaciones
- Copa Sudamericana First Stage, first leg:
  - Tigre (Argentina) 2–1 (Argentina) San Lorenzo
- Copa Sudamericana First Stage, second leg: (first leg score in parentheses)
  - Deportivo Cali (Colombia) 0–1 (1–2) **Universidad de Chile**. Universidad de Chile win 3–1 on aggregate.

=== August 17, 2009 (Monday) ===
==== Athletics ====
- World Championships in Berlin, Germany:
  - Men's hammer throw: (gold) Primož Kozmus (SLO) 80.84 (silver) Szymon Ziółkowski (POL) 79.30 (bronze) Aleksey Zagornyi (RUS) 78.09
  - Women's pole vault: (gold) Anna Rogowska (POL) 4.75 (silver) Chelsea Johnson (USA) & Monika Pyrek (POL) 4.65
    - Four-time world champion Yelena Isinbayeva fails to clear any height.
  - Women's triple jump: (gold) Yargelis Savigne (CUB) 14.95 (silver) Mabel Gay (CUB) 14.61 (bronze) Anna Pyatykh (RUS) 14.58
  - Women's 3000 metres steeplechase: (gold) Marta Domínguez (ESP) 9:07.32 (silver) Yuliya Zarudneva (RUS) 9:08.39 (bronze) Milcah Chemos Cheywa (KEN) 9:08.57
  - Men's 10,000 metres: (gold) Kenenisa Bekele (ETH) 26:46.31 CR (silver) Zersenay Tadese (ERI) 26:50.12 (bronze) Moses Ndiema Masai (KEN) 26:57.39
    - Bekele wins his fourth straight title at this event.
  - Women's 100 metres:
    - Semifinals, heat 1: (1) Shelly-Ann Fraser (JAM) 10.79
    - Semifinals, heat 2: (1) Carmelita Jeter (USA) 10.83
    - Final: (gold) Fraser 10.73 (silver) Kerron Stewart (JAM) 10.75 (bronze) Jeter 10.90
      - Fraser becomes the joint-third fastest woman in history and clocks the fastest time in more than 10 years.

==== Basketball ====
- EuroBasket qualification additional qualifying round: (teams in **bold** advance to the final series)
  - Group A: Belgium 102–79 Bosnia and Herzegovina
    - Standings: Bosnia & Herzegovina 7 points (4 games), Belgium 5 (3), Portugal 3 (3).
    - Belgium will advance to the final series if they beat Portugal; otherwise Bosnia & Herzegovina advance.
  - Group B: Finland 77–73 **France**
    - Standings: France 7 points (4 games), Italy, Finland 4 (3).

==== Cricket ====
- ICC Intercontinental Cup:
  - Canada v Kenya in King City, Ontario, day 4:
    - Kenya 317 & 362/3d; Canada 234 & 198 (65.3 ov). **Kenya win by 247 runs**.
      - Kenya goes to the top of the standings with 23 points from 2 matches, ahead of Scotland with 20 points from one match.
  - Zimbabwe XI v Afghanistan in Mutare, day 2:
    - Zimbabwe XI 350 (Tatenda Taibu 172); Afghanistan 358/7 (110.0 ov, Noor Ali 130). Afghanistan lead by 8 runs with 3 wickets remaining in the 1st innings.
  - Scotland v Ireland in Aberdeen, day 1:
    - Ireland 202; Scotland 76/2 (27.0 ov). Scotland trail by 126 runs with 8 wickets remaining in the 1st innings.

=== August 16, 2009 (Sunday) ===
==== Athletics ====
- World Championships in Berlin, Germany:
  - Women's 20 kilometres walk: (gold) Olga Kaniskina (RUS) 1:28:09 (silver) Olive Loughnane (IRL) 1:28:58 (bronze) Liu Hong (CHN) 1:29:10
  - Women's shot put: (gold) Valerie Vili (NZL) 20.44 (silver) Nadine Kleinert (GER) 20.20 (bronze) Gong Lijiao (CHN) 19.89
  - Women's heptathlon: (gold) Jessica Ennis (GBR) 6731 points (silver) Jennifer Oeser (GER) 6493 (bronze) Kamila Chudzik (POL) 6471
  - Men's 100 metres:
    - Semifinals, heat 1: (1) Usain Bolt (JAM) 9.89
    - Semifinals, heat 2: (1) Tyson Gay (USA) 9.93
    - Final: (gold) Bolt 9.58 WR (silver) Gay 9.71 NR (bronze) Asafa Powell (JAM) 9.84
      - Bolt improves his own record by 0.11 second, the biggest improvement of the world record in 100 metres dash since the introduction of electronic measurement.

==== Auto racing ====
- Sprint Cup Series:
  - CARFAX 400 in Brooklyn, Michigan:
    - (1) Brian Vickers (North Carolina) (Toyota, Red Bull Racing Team) (2) Jeff Gordon (California) (Chevrolet, Hendrick Motorsports) (3) Dale Earnhardt Jr. (North Carolina) (Chevrolet, Hendrick Motorsports)
      - Drivers' standings (after 23 of 26 races leading to the Chase for the Sprint Cup): (1) Tony Stewart (Indiana) 3500 points (Chevrolet, Stewart Haas Racing) (2) Gordon 3216 (3) Jimmie Johnson (California) 3197 (Chevrolet, Hendrick Motorsports)
      - Stewart becomes the first driver to secure his spot in the 2009 Chase.

==== Badminton ====
- BWF World Championships in Hyderabad, India: (seeding in parentheses)
  - Men's singles: Lin Dan (CHN) (5) bt Chen Jin (CHN) (2) 21–18, 21–16
  - Women's singles: Lu Lan (CHN) (7) bt Xie Xingfang (CHN) (5) 23–21, 21–12
  - Men's doubles: Cai Yun/Fu Haifeng (CHN) (5) bt Jung Jae-sung/Lee Yong-dae (KOR) (4) 21–18, 16–21, 28–26
  - Women's doubles: Zhang Yawen/Zhao Tingting (CHN) (8) bt Cheng Shu/Zhao Yunlei (CHN) (2) 17–21, 21–17, 21–16
  - Mixed doubles: Thomas Laybourn/Kamilla Rytter Juhl (DEN) (7) bt Nova Widianto/Liliyana Natsir (INA) (2) 21–13, 21–17

==== Basketball ====
- Asian Championship in Tianjin, China:
  - Final: (gold) Iran 70–52 (silver) China
    - Iran win the title for the second straight time.
  - 3rd place: (bronze) Jordan 80–66 Lebanon
    - Jordan qualify for 2010 World Championship.

==== Cricket ====
- Bangladesh in Zimbabwe:
  - 4th ODI in Bulawayo:
    - Zimbabwe 312/8 (50 ov, Charles Coventry 194 *); Bangladesh 313/6 (47.5 ov, Tamim Iqbal 154). **Bangladesh win by 4 wickets, take unassailable 3–1 lead in the 5-match series.**
- ICC Intercontinental Cup:
  - Canada v Kenya in King City, Ontario, day 3:
    - Kenya 317 & 362/3d (Seren Waters 157*, Steve Tikolo 169); Canada 234 & 61/2 (15.0 ov). Canada require another 385 runs with 8 wickets remaining.
  - Zimbabwe XI v Afghanistan in Mutare, day 1:

==== Cycling ====
- UCI ProTour:
  - Vattenfall Cyclassics:
    - (1) Tyler Farrar (USA) (Garmin–Slipstream) 5h 30' 38" (2) Matti Breschel (DEN) (Saxo Bank) (3) Gerald Ciolek (GER) (Team Milram)

==== Field hockey ====
- Women's Junior World Cup in Boston, USA:
  - Third place: (bronze) South Korea 2–1 England
  - Final: (gold) Netherlands 3–0 (silver) Argentina

==== Football (soccer) ====
- CAF Champions League group stage, round 3:
  - Group B:
    - Heartland (Nigeria) 3–0 (Tunisia) Étoile du Sahel
      - Standings: TP Mazembe, Heartland 6 points, Étoile du Sahel, Monomotapa United 3.
- Spanish Super Cup, first leg:
  - Athletic Bilbao 1–2 Barcelona

==== Golf ====
- Men's majors:
  - PGA Championship in Chaska, Minnesota, final round:
    - (1) Y.E. Yang (KOR) 280 (−8) (2) Tiger Woods (USA) 283 (−5) (3) Lee Westwood (ENG) & Rory McIlroy (NIR) 285 (−3)
      - Yang becomes the first Asian-born winner of a men's major championship, and also ends Woods' previous record of winning every major in which he led after the third round.

==== Motorcycle racing ====
- Moto GP:
  - Czech Republic Grand Prix in Brno, Czech Republic:
    - (1) Valentino Rossi (ITA) (Yamaha) 43:08.991 (2) Dani Pedrosa (ESP) (Honda) +11.766 (3) Toni Elias (ESP) (Honda) +20.756
      - Riders' standings (after 11 of 17 races): (1) Rossi 212 points (2) Jorge Lorenzo (ESP) (Yamaha) 162 (3) Casey Stoner (AUS) (Ducati) 150
      - Manufacturers' standings: (1) Yamaha 230 points (2) Honda 164 (3) Ducati 156

==== Shooting ====
- World Shotgun Championships in Maribor, Slovenia:
  - Men's skeet: (gold) Vincent Hancock (USA) 149 (124) (silver) Georgios Achilleos (CYP) 148 (123) (bronze) Ennio Falco (ITA) 147 (122)

==== Tennis ====
- ATP World Tour:
  - Rogers Cup in Montreal, Canada:
    - Final: Andy Murray (GBR) def. Juan Martín del Potro (ARG) 6–7(4), 7–6(3), 6–1
      - Murray wins his 5th title of the year and 13th of his career. He advances to #2 in the ATP ranking.
- WTA Tour:
  - Western & Southern Financial Group Women's Open in Mason, Ohio, United States:
    - Final: Jelena Janković (SRB) def. Dinara Safina (RUS) 6–4, 6–2
      - Janković wins her second title of the year and 11th overall.

==== Volleyball ====
- FIVB World Grand Prix:
  - 3rd Preliminary round: (teams in **bold** advance to the final round)
    - Pool G in Hong Kong:
      - Dominican Republic 2–3 Poland
      - **China** 3–1 **Netherlands**
    - Pool H in Mokpo, South Korea:
      - **Germany** 2–3 **Japan**
      - South Korea 1–3 **Brazil**
    - Pool I in Bangkok, Thailand:
      - United States 2–3 Thailand
      - Puerto Rico 0–3 **Russia**
    - Final standings: Brazil 18 points, Netherlands 17, China 16, Russia 15, Japan, Germany 14, Poland, Thailand 13, USA 12, Puerto Rico, Dominican Republic, Korea 10.

=== August 15, 2009 (Saturday) ===
==== Athletics ====
- World Championships in Berlin, Germany:
  - Men's 20 kilometres walk: (gold) Valeriy Borchin (RUS) 1:18:41 (silver) Wang Hao (CHN) 1:19:06 (bronze) Eder Sanchez (MEX) 1:19:22
  - Women's 10,000 metres: (gold) Linet Masai (KEN) 30:51.24 (silver) Meselech Melkamu (ETH) 30:51.34 (bronze) Wude Ayalew (ETH) 30:51.95
  - Men's shot put: (gold) Christian Cantwell (USA) 22.03 (silver) Tomasz Majewski (POL) 21.91 (bronze) Ralf Bartels (GER) 21.37
  - Women's heptathlon (standings after 4 events): (1) Jessica Ennis (GBR) 4124 points (2) Nataliya Dobrynska (UKR) 3817 (3) Jennifer Oeser (GER) 3814

==== Auto racing ====
- Nationwide Series:
  - CARFAX 250 in Brooklyn, Michigan:
    - (1) Brad Keselowski (Michigan) (Chevrolet, JR Motorsports) (2) Brian Vickers (North Carolina) (Toyota, Braun Racing) (3) Kyle Busch (Nevada) (Toyota, Joe Gibbs Racing)

==== Basketball ====
- African Championship in Tripoli, Libya:
  - Final: (gold) Angola 82–72 (silver) Ivory Coast
    - Angola win the title for the sixth successive time and 10th of the last 11 tournaments.
  - 3rd place: (bronze) Tunisia 83–68 Cameroon
    - Tunisia qualify for the 2010 World Championship.
- Asian Championship in Tianjin, China:
  - Semi-finals:
    - Jordan 75–77 Iran
    - Lebanon 68–72 China
      - Iran and China qualify for the 2010 World Championship.

==== Cricket ====
- ICC Intercontinental Cup in King City, Ontario, day 2:
  - Kenya 317 & 12/0 (7.0 ov); Canada 234. Kenya lead by 95 runs with 10 wickets remaining.
- Twenty20 Cup Final in Birmingham:
  - Sussex Sharks 172/7 (20/20 ov); Somerset Sabres 109 (17.2/20 ov). **Sussex win by 63 runs**.

==== Fistball ====
- European Women's Championship in Zofingen, Switzerland:
  - 3rd place: (bronze) Germany 3–0 Italy
  - Final: (gold) Switzerland 3–1 (silver) Austria

==== Football (soccer) ====
- CAF Champions League group stage, round 3:
  - Group A:
    - Al-Merreikh (Sudan) 2–3 (Zambia) ZESCO United
      - Standings: Al-Hilal 7 points, ZESCO United, Kano Pillars 4, Al-Merreikh 1.
  - Group B:
    - TP Mazembe (Democratic Republic of the Congo) 5–0 (Zimbabwe) Monomotapa United
      - Standings: TP Mazembe 6 points (3 matches), Étoile du Sahel, Heartland 3 (2), Monomotapa United 3 (3).
- Women's Professional Soccer Playoffs First round in Germantown, Maryland:
  - Washington Freedom 1–2 **Sky Blue FC**

==== Golf ====
- Men's majors:
  - PGA Championship in Chaska, Minnesota, third round:
    - Leaderboard: (1) Tiger Woods (USA) 208 (−8) (2) Y.E. Yang (KOR) & Pádraig Harrington (IRL) 210 (−6)

==== Volleyball ====
- FIVB World Grand Prix:
  - 3rd Preliminary round: (teams in **bold** advance to the final round)
    - Pool G in Hong Kong:
      - Dominican Republic 0–3 **Netherlands**
      - **China** 2–3 Poland
    - Pool H in Mokpo, South Korea:
      - **Brazil** 3–2 **Germany**
      - South Korea 0–3 **Japan**
    - Pool I in Bangkok, Thailand:
      - **Russia** 3–1 Thailand
      - Puerto Rico 0–3 United States
    - Standings after 8 matches: Brazil, Netherlands 16 points, China 14, Russia, Germany 13, Japan 12, Poland, USA, Thailand 11, Puerto Rico, Dominican Republic, Korea 9.

=== August 14, 2009 (Friday) ===
==== American football ====
- The Philadelphia Eagles sign former Atlanta Falcons quarterback Michael Vick, recently released from federal prison after serving over two years for his dog fighting activities. The deal is for one year at US$1.6 million, with a team option for a second year at $5.2 million. (ESPN)

==== Basketball ====
- African Championship in Tripoli, Libya:
  - Semifinals:
    - Angola 79–69 Tunisia
    - Cameroon 61–68 Ivory Coast
      - Angola and Côte d'Ivoire qualify for 2010 World Championship.
- Asian Championship in Tianjin, China:
  - Quarter-finals:
    - Jordan 81–70 Philippines
    - Qatar 65–75 Iran
    - Chinese Taipei 83–101 China
    - South Korea 65–68 Lebanon
- EuroBasket qualification additional qualifying round:
  - Group A: Bosnia and Herzegovina 73–61 Portugal
    - Standings: Bosnia & Herzegovina 6 points (3 games), Belgium 3 (2), Portugal 3 (3).
  - Group B: France 81–61 Italy
    - Standings: France 6 points (3 games), Italy 4 (3), Finland 2 (2).
    - France advance to the final series.

==== Cricket ====
- Bangladesh in Zimbabwe:
  - 3rd ODI in Bulawayo:
    - Zimbabwe 323/7 (50 ov, Hamilton Masakadza 102); Bangladesh 254 (44.2 ov). **Zimbabwe win by 69 runs. Bangladesh lead the 5-match series 2–1**.
- ICC Intercontinental Cup:
  - Canada v Kenya in King City, Ontario, day 1:
    - Kenya 317 (86.1 ov, Steve Tikolo 158); Canada 14/2 (6.0 ov). Canada trail by 303 runs with 8 wickets remaining in the 1st innings.

==== Fistball ====
- European Women's Championship in Zofingen, Switzerland:
  - First round:
    - Switzerland 2–0 Catalonia
    - Germany 2–0 Italy
    - Switzerland 2–0 Italy
    - Austria 2–0 Catalonia
    - Switzerland 1–2 Austria
    - Germany 2–0 Catalonia
    - Austria 2–0 Germany
    - Italy 2–0 Catalonia
    - Switzerland 2–0 Germany
    - Austria 2–0 Italy
      - Standings: **Austria** 4–0, Switzerland 3–1, Germany 2–2, Italy 1–3, Catalonia 0–4.

==== Football (soccer) ====
- CAF Champions League group stage, round 3:
  - Group A:
    - Al-Hilal (Sudan) 2–0 (Nigeria) Kano Pillars
      - Standings: Al-Hilal 7 points (3 matches), Kano Pillars 4 (3), ZESCO United, Al-Merreikh 1 (2).

==== Golf ====
- Men's majors:
  - PGA Championship in Chaska, Minnesota, second round:
    - Leaderboard: (1) Tiger Woods (USA) 137 (−7) (2) Ross Fisher (ENG), Lucas Glover (USA), Pádraig Harrington (IRL), Brendan Jones (AUS), & Vijay Singh (FJI) 141 (−3)

==== Volleyball ====
- FIVB World Grand Prix:
  - 3rd Preliminary round: (teams in **bold** advance to the final round)
    - Pool G in Hong Kong:
      - Poland 0–3 **Netherlands**
      - **China** 3–1 Dominican Republic
    - Pool H in Mokpo, South Korea:
      - South Korea 1–3 Germany
      - Japan 1–3 **Brazil**
    - Pool I in Bangkok, Thailand:
      - Puerto Rico 0–3 Thailand
      - United States 1–3 Russia
    - Standings after 7 matches: Brazil, Netherlands 14 points, China 13, Germany 12, Russia 11, Japan, Thailand 10, Poland, USA 9, Puerto Rico, Dominican Republic, Korea 8.

=== August 13, 2009 (Thursday) ===
==== Basketball ====
- African Championship in Tripoli, Libya:
  - Quarterfinals:
    - Angola 84–63 Central African Republic
    - Mali 73–74 Tunisia
    - Nigeria 80–84 Cameroon
    - Ivory Coast 84–78 Senegal

==== Football (soccer) ====
- Copa Sudamericana First Stage, first leg:
  - Vitória (Brazil) 2–0 (Brazil) Coritiba
  - Liverpool (Uruguay) 0–0 (Peru) Cienciano

==== Golf ====
- Men's majors:
  - PGA Championship in Chaska, Minnesota, first round:
    - Leaderboard: (1) Tiger Woods (USA) 67 (−5) (2) Pádraig Harrington (IRL) 68 (−4) (3) Six players at 69 (−3)

==== Olympics ====
- At a meeting in Berlin, the executive board of the International Olympic Committee recommends golf and rugby sevens for inclusion in the 2016 Summer Olympics program. The choices must still be ratified by the full IOC at its October meeting in Copenhagen. The board also decide to include women's boxing at the 2012 Summer Olympics in London. (ESPN)

==== Shooting ====
- World Shotgun Championships in Maribor, Slovenia:
  - Men's double trap: (gold) Francesco D'Aniello (ITA) 190 (146) (silver) Jeffrey Holguín (USA) 186+2 (144) (bronze) Wang Nan (CHN) 186+0 (144)

=== August 12, 2009 (Wednesday) ===
==== Basketball ====
- Asian Championship in Tianjin, China: (teams in **bold** advance to the quarterfinals)
  - Group E:
    - **Philippines** 85–71 Kuwait
    - Japan 79–99 **Chinese Taipei**
    - **South Korea** 66–82 **Iran**
      - Standings: Iran 10 points, Korea 9, Philippines 8, Chinese Taipei 7, Japan 6, Kuwait 5.
  - Group F:
    - **Qatar** 91–45 United Arab Emirates
    - Kazakhstan 56–105 **Lebanon**
    - **China** 89–83 **Jordan**
      - Standings: China 10 points, Jordan 9, Lebanon 8, Qatar 7, Kazakhstan 6, UAE 5.

==== Cricket ====
- Pakistan in Sri Lanka:
  - Only T20I in Colombo:
    - Pakistan 172/5 (20.0/20 ov); Sri Lanka 120 (18.1/20 ov). **Pakistan win by 52 runs**.

==== Football (soccer) ====
- 2010 FIFA World Cup Qualifying:
  - 2010 FIFA World Cup qualification (UEFA):
    - Group 3:
      - Slovenia 5–0 San Marino
        - Standings: Slovakia 15 points (6 matches), Northern Ireland 13 (7), Slovenia 11 (7).
    - Group 4:
      - Azerbaijan 0–2 Germany
        - Standings: Germany 19 points (7 matches), Russia 15 (6), Finland 10 (6).
    - Group 6:
      - Belarus 1–3 Croatia
        - Standings: England 21 points (7 matches), Croatia 14 (7), Ukraine 11 (6).
    - Group 7:
      - Faroe Islands 0–1 France
        - Standings: Serbia 18 points (7 matches), France 13 (6), Lithuania 9 (7).
    - Group 9:
      - Norway 4–0 Scotland
        - Standings: **Netherlands** 21 points (7 matches), Macedonia, Scotland 7 (6), Norway 6 (4).
  - 2010 FIFA World Cup qualification (CONCACAF), matchday 6: (All times UTC)
    - Mexico 2–1 United States
    - Trinidad and Tobago 1–0 El Salvador
    - Honduras 4–0 Costa Rica
      - Standings: Costa Rica 12 points, Honduras, USA 10, Mexico 9, El Salvador, Trinidad & Tobago 5.
  - Friendly internationals:
    - Albania 6–1 Cyprus
    - Algeria 1–0 Uruguay
    - Angola 2–0 Togo
    - Armenia 1–4 Moldova
    - Austria 0–2 Cameroon
    - Bosnia and Herzegovina 2–3 Iran
    - Bulgaria 1–0 Latvia
    - Czech Republic 3–1 Belgium
    - Denmark 1–2 Chile
    - Egypt 3–3 Guinea
    - Estonia 0–1 Brazil
    - Ghana 4–1 Zambia
    - Hungary 0–1 Romania
    - Iceland 1–1 Slovakia
    - Republic of Ireland 0–3 Australia
    - Liechtenstein 0–3 Portugal
    - Luxembourg 0–1 Lithuania
    - North Macedonia 2–3 Spain
    - Mali 3–0 Burkina Faso
    - Malta 2–0 Georgia
    - Montenegro 2–1 Wales
    - Morocco 1–1 Congo
    - Mozambique 1–0 Swaziland
    - Netherlands 2–2 England
    - Northern Ireland 1–1 Israel
    - Oman 2–1 Saudi Arabia
    - Poland 2–0 Greece
    - Russia 2–3 Argentina
    - Rwanda 1–2 Tanzania
    - Senegal 2–1 DR Congo
    - Singapore 1–1 China
    - South Africa 1–3 Serbia
    - South Korea 1–0 Paraguay
    - Sweden 1–0 Finland
    - Switzerland 0–0 Italy
    - Tunisia 0–0 Ivory Coast
    - Ukraine 0–3 Turkey
- Copa Sudamericana First Stage, first leg:
  - Fluminense (Brazil) 0–0 (Brazil) Flamengo
  - Cerro Porteño (Paraguay) 2–0 (Bolivia) La Paz

=== August 11, 2009 (Tuesday) ===
==== Auto racing ====
- Seven-time Formula One champion Michael Schumacher calls off his comeback to F1 racing as a substitute driver for the injured Felipe Massa, citing lingering effects of injuries suffered in a motorcycle crash in February. Massa's Ferrari ride will instead be taken over by Luca Badoer. (AP via ESPN)

==== Basketball ====
- African Championship in Libya: (teams in **bold** advance to the quarterfinals)
  - Group E in Benghazi:
    - Egypt 64–80 **Ivory Coast**
    - **Mali** 95–73 Libya
    - **Angola** 93–85 **Nigeria**
      - Standings: Angola 12 points, Nigeria 11, Mali 10, Côte d'Ivoire 9, Libya 8, Egypt 7.
  - Group F in Tripoli:
    - Morocco 73–81 **Central African Republic**
    - Rwanda 82–69 **Cameroon**
    - **Tunisia** 65–73 **Senegal**
      - Standings: Senegal, Tunisia 10 points, Cameroon, Central African Republic, Morocco, Rwanda 9.
- Asian Championship in Tianjin, China: (teams in **bold** advance to the quarterfinals)
  - Group E:
    - **Iran** 88–78 **Philippines**
    - Kuwait 51–78 Japan
    - Chinese Taipei 70–72 **South Korea**
      - Standings: Iran, Korea 8 points, Philippines 6, Chinese Taipei, Japan 5, Kuwait 4.
  - Group F:
    - United Arab Emirates 56–84 Kazakhstan
    - Lebanon 68–71 **China**
    - **Jordan** 74–60 Qatar
      - Standings: China, Jordan 8 points, Lebanon 6, Qatar, Kazakhstan 5, UAE 4.
- EuroBasket qualification additional qualifying round:
  - Group A: Belgium 64–58 Portugal
    - Standings: Bosnia and Herzegovina 4 points, Belgium 3, Portugal 2.
  - Group B: Finland 75–77 Italy
    - Standings: France 4 points, Italy 3, Finland 2.

==== Cricket ====
- Bangladesh in Zimbabwe:
  - 2nd ODI in Bulawayo:
    - Bangladesh 320/8 (50 ov, Shakib Al Hasan 104); Zimbabwe 271 (46.1 ov). **Bangladesh win by 49 runs, lead the 5-match series 2–0**.

==== Football (soccer) ====
- Copa Sudamericana First Stage, first leg:
  - LDU Quito (Ecuador) 1–0 (Paraguay) Libertad
  - Blooming (Bolivia) 0–1 (Uruguay) River Plate
    - Match abandoned after 66 minutes due to incident involving a spectator and a River Plate player. River Plate is awarded a 3–0 win.

==== Shooting ====
- World Shotgun Championships in Maribor, Slovenia:
  - Women's skeet: (gold) Christine Brinker (GER) 95 (72) (silver) Sutiya Jiewchaloemmit (THA) 94 (73) (bronze) Katiuscia Spada (ITA) 93 (72)
  - Women's trap: (gold) Jessica Rossi (ITA) 92 (71) (silver) Irina Laricheva (RUS) 90 (73) (bronze) Satu Mäkelä-Nummela (FIN) 89 (74 **EWR**)

=== August 10, 2009 (Monday) ===
==== Auto racing ====
- Sprint Cup Series:
  - Heluva Good! Sour Cream Dips at The Glen in Watkins Glen, New York
    - (1) Tony Stewart (Indiana) (Chevrolet, Stewart Haas Racing) (2) Marcos Ambrose (Australia) (Toyota, JTG Daugherty Racing) (3) Carl Edwards (Missouri) (Ford, Roush Fenway Racing)
      - Drivers' standings (after 22 of 26 races leading to the Chase for the Sprint Cup): (1) Stewart 3383 points (2) Jimmie Johnson (California) 3123 (Chevrolet, Hendrick Motorsports) (3) Jeff Gordon (California) 3041 (Chevrolet, Hendrick Motorsports)
      - Stewart needs only to start next weekend's race at Michigan to become the first driver to secure a spot in the Chase.

==== Basketball ====
- African Championship in Libya: (teams in **bold** advance to the quarterfinals)
  - Group E in Benghazi:
    - Ivory Coast 61–88 **Angola**
    - Libya 75–73 Egypt
    - **Nigeria** 74–70 Mali
      - Standings: Angola, Nigeria 10 points, Mali 8, Côte d'Ivoire, Libya 7, Egypt 6.
  - Group F in Tripoli:
    - Central African Republic 85–64 Rwanda
    - Senegal 73–75 Morocco
    - Cameroon 66–68 **Tunisia**
      - Standings: Tunisia 9 points, Cameroon, Senegal, Morocco 8, Central African Republic, Rwanda 7.
- Asian Championship in Tianjin, China:
  - Group E:
    - South Korea 78–58 Kuwait
    - Japan 71–101 Iran
    - Philippines 77–70 Chinese Taipei
      - Standings: Iran, Korea 6 points, Philippines 5, Chinese Taipei 4, Japan, Quwait 3.
  - Group F:
    - Kazakhstan 80–98 Jordan
    - China 82–59 United Arab Emirates
    - Qatar 63–73 Lebanon
      - Standings: China, Jordan 6 points, Lebanon 5, Qatar 4, Kazakhstan, UAE 3.

=== August 9, 2009 (Sunday) ===
==== Auto racing ====
- Sprint Cup Series:
  - Heluva Good! Sour Cream Dips at The Glen in Watkins Glen, New York
    - Postponed to Monday due to rain.
- IndyCar Series:
  - Honda 200 in Lexington, Ohio
    - (1) Scott Dixon (NZL) (Chip Ganassi Racing) (2) Ryan Briscoe (AUS) (Penske Racing) (3) Dario Franchitti (GBR) (Chip Ganassi Racing)
      - Drivers' standings (after 13 of 17 races): (1) Dixon 460 points (2) Briscoe 457 (3) Franchitti 440

==== Basketball ====
- African Championship in Libya:
  - Group E in Benghazi:
    - Mali 71–58 Ivory Coast
    - Angola 91–58 Libya
    - Egypt 77–87 Nigeria
      - Standings: Angola, Nigeria 8 points, Mali 7, Côte d'Ivoire 6, Egypt, Libya 5.
  - Group F in Tripoli:
    - Morocco 54–80 Cameroon
    - Rwanda 72–59 Senegal
    - Tunisia 76–75 Central African Republic
      - Standings: Senegal, Cameroon, Tunisia 7 points, Morocco, Rwanda 6, Central African Republic 5.

==== Cricket ====
- Australia in England:
  - The Ashes Series:
    - 4th Test in Leeds, day 3:
      - England 102 & 263 (61.3 ov, Mitchell Johnson 5/69); Australia 445. **Australia win by an innings and 80 runs. 5-match series level 1–1.**
- Pakistan in Sri Lanka:
  - 5th ODI in Colombo:
    - Pakistan 279/8 (50 ov); Sri Lanka 147 (34.2 ov). **Pakistan win by 132 runs. Sri Lanka win the 5-match series 3–2.**
- Bangladesh in Zimbabwe:
  - 1st ODI in Bulawayo:
    - Zimbabwe 207 (47.5 ov); Bangladesh 211/2 (34.3 ov, Mohammad Ashraful 103*). **Bangladesh win by 8 wickets, lead 5-match series 1–0.**

==== Football (soccer) ====
- Community Shield at Wembley Stadium, London:
  - Manchester United 2–2 Chelsea. Chelsea win 4–1 in penalty shootout.

==== Golf ====
- World Golf Championships:
  - Bridgestone Invitational in Akron, Ohio
    - Winner: Tiger Woods (USA) 268 (−12)
      - Woods wins for the second straight week, helped greatly by a four-shot swing on the 16th hole where he birdied and Pádraig Harrington (IRL) triple-bogeyed.
- PGA Tour:
  - Legends Reno-Tahoe Open in Reno, Nevada
    - Winner: John Rollins (USA) 271 (−17)

==== Shooting ====
- World Shotgun Championships in Maribor, Slovenia: (Qualification scores in parentheses)
  - Men's trap: (gold) Marian Kovacocy (SVK) 146 (122) (silver) Massimo Fabbrizi (ITA) 145+1 (123) (bronze) Oguzhan Tuzun (TUR) 145+0 (123)

==== Tennis ====
- ATP World Tour:
  - Legg Mason Tennis Classic in Washington, D.C., United States
    - Final: **Juan Martín del Potro** (ARG) def. Andy Roddick (USA) 3–6, 7–5, 7–6(6)
      - Del Potro wins this tournament for the second consecutive year for his second title of the year and sixth of his career.
- WTA Tour:
  - LA Women's Tennis Championships in Carson, California, United States
    - Final: **Flavia Pennetta** (ITA) def. Samantha Stosur (AUS) 6–4, 6–3
      - Pennetta wins her second title of the year and eighth of her career.

==== Volleyball ====
- FIVB World Grand Prix:
  - 2nd Preliminary round: (teams in **bold** advance to the final round)
    - Pool D in Miaoli, Chinese Taipei
      - **Netherlands** 3–0 Dominican Republic
      - Germany 3–0 United States
    - Pool E in Macau
      - Thailand 0–3 Poland
      - China 2–3 **Brazil**
    - Pool F in Osaka, Japan
      - South Korea 3–2 Puerto Rico
      - Japan 3–1 Russia
    - Standings after 6 matches: Brazil, Netherlands 12 points, China 11, Germany 10, Japan, Russia 9, Poland, USA, Thailand 8, Puerto Rico, Korea, Dominican Republic 7.

=== August 8, 2009 (Saturday) ===
==== Auto racing ====
- Nationwide Series:
  - Zippo 200 at the Glen in Watkins Glen, New York
    - (1) Marcos Ambrose (Australia) (Toyota, JTG Daugherty Racing) (2) Kyle Busch (Nevada) (Toyota, Joe Gibbs Racing) (3) Carl Edwards (Missouri) (Ford, Roush Fenway Racing)

==== Basketball ====
- Asian Championship in Tianjin, China: (teams in **bold** advance to the second round)
  - Group A:
    - Sri Lanka 45–148 **Japan**
    - **Philippines** 56–69 **South Korea**
      - Standings: Korea 6 points, Philippines 5, Japan 4, Sri Lanka 3.
  - Group B:
    - Uzbekistan 78–102 **Chinese Taipei**
    - **Kuwait** 46–94 **Iran**
      - Standings: Iran 6 points, Chinese Taipei 5, Kuwait 4, Uzbekistan 3.
  - Group C:
    - **China** 92–61 **Qatar**
    - India 72–74 **Kazakhstan**
      - Standings: China 6 points, Qatar 5, Kazakhstan 4, India 3.
  - Group D:
    - **United Arab Emirates** 67–79 **Jordan**
    - Indonesia 36–123 **Lebanon**
      - Standings: Jordan 6 points, Lebanon 5, UAE 4, Indonesia 3.
- EuroBasket qualification additional qualifying round:
  - Group A: Bosnia and Herzegovina 82–77 Belgium
    - Standings: Bosnia & Herzegovina 4 points (2 games), Belgium, Portugal 1(1).
  - Group B: France 82–72 Finland
    - Standings: France 4 points (2 games), Italy, Finland 1(1).

==== Cricket ====
- Australia in England:
  - The Ashes Series:
    - 4th Test in Leeds, day 2:
      - England 102 & 82/5 (32.0 ov); Australia 445 (Marcus North 110, Stuart Broad 6/91). England trail by 261 runs with 5 wickets remaining.

==== Cycling ====
- UCI ProTour:
  - Tour de Pologne:
    - Stage 7: (1) André Greipel (GER) (Team Columbia–HTC) 2h 55' 39" (2) Christopher Sutton (AUS) (Garmin–Slipstream) s.t. (3) Wouter Weylandt (BEL) (Quick-Step) s.t.
    - Final general classification: (1) Alessandro Ballan (ITA) (Lampre–NGC) 28h 46' 13" (2) Daniel Moreno (ESP) (Caisse d'Epargne) + 10' (3) Edvald Boasson Hagen (NOR) (Team Columbia–HTC) + 11"

==== Football (soccer) ====
- Italian Supercup in Beijing, China:
  - Internazionale 1–2 **Lazio**

==== Racquetball ====
- European Championships in Paris:
  - Men's singles:
    - (gold) Víctor Montserrat (CAT) (silver) Carlos Oviedo (CAT) (bronze) Eric Gordon (GER) (bronze) Oliver Bertels (GER)
  - Women's singles:
    - (gold) Elisabet Consegal (CAT) (silver) Yvonne Kortes (GER) (bronze) Andrea Gordon (GER) (bronze) Majella Haverty (IRL)
  - Men's doubles:
    - (gold) Adam Neary / Joe Farrell (IRL) (silver) Eric Gordon / Oliver Bertels (GER) (bronze) Joseph Dillon / Sean Kene (IRL) (bronze) Arne Schmitz / Bernd Dröge (GER)
  - Women's doubles:
    - (gold) Antonia Neary (IRL) (silver) Katie Kenny / Majella Haverty (IRL) (bronze) Yvonne Kortes / Andrea Gordon (GER) (bronze) Daphne Wannee / Kathy Tritsmans (NED) / (BEL)

==== Rugby union ====
- Tri Nations Series:
  - South Africa 29–17 Australia in Cape Town
    - Standings: South Africa 12 points (3 matches), New Zealand 4 (3 matches), Australia 1 (2 matches)

==== Volleyball ====
- FIVB World Grand Prix:
  - 2nd Preliminary round:
    - Pool D in Miaoli, Chinese Taipei:
      - United States 2–3 Netherlands
      - Dominican Republic 0–3 Germany
    - Pool E in Macau:
      - Brazil 3–1 Poland
      - China 3–1 Thailand
    - Pool F in Osaka, Japan:
      - Russia 1–3 Puerto Rico
      - Japan 3–1 South Korea
    - Standing after 5 matches: Brazil, China, Netherlands 10 points, Germany, Russia 8, Japan, USA, Thailand 7, Poland, Puerto Rico, Dominican Republic 6, South Korea 5.

=== August 7, 2009 (Friday) ===
==== Basketball ====
- African Championship in Libya: (teams in **bold** advance to the second round)
  - Group A in Benghazi:
    - **Libya** 81–97 **Nigeria**
    - **Ivory Coast** 94–57 South Africa
      - Standings: Nigeria 6 points, Côte d'Ivoire 5, Libya 4, South Africa 3.
  - Group B in Benghazi:
    - **Angola** 93–50 Mozambique
    - **Egypt** 47–67 **Mali**
      - Standings: Angola 6 points, Mali 5, Egypt 4, Mozambique 3.
  - Group C in Tripoli:
    - **Cameroon** 65–67 **Senegal**
    - Congo 61–113 **Central African Republic**
      - Standings: Senegal 6 points, Cameroon 5, Central African Republic 4, Congo 3.
  - Group D in Tripoli:
    - Cape Verde 83–86 **Morocco**
    - **Rwanda** 57–74 **Tunisia**
      - Standings: Tunisia, Morocco 5 points, Rwanda, Cape Verde 4.
- Asian Championship in Tianjin, China: (teams in **bold** advance to the second round)
  - Group A:
    - **South Korea** 122–54 Sri Lanka
    - Japan 69–78 **Philippines**
  - Group B:
    - Chinese Taipei 73–51 Kuwait
    - **Iran** 82–61 Uzbekistan
  - Group C:
    - Kazakhstan 56–74 **China**
    - **Qatar** 95–70 India
  - Group D:
    - **Jordan** 105–47 Indonesia
    - Lebanon 108–38 United Arab Emirates

==== Cricket ====
- Australia in England:
  - The Ashes Series:
    - 4th Test in Leeds, day 1:
      - England 102 (Peter Siddle 5/21); Australia 196/4. Australia lead by 94 runs with 6 wickets remaining in the 1st innings.
- Pakistan in Sri Lanka:
  - 4th ODI in Colombo:
    - Pakistan 321/5 (50 ov, Umar Akmal 102*); Sri Lanka 175 (36.1 ov). **Pakistan win by 146 runs. Sri Lanka lead the 5-match series 3–1**.

==== Cycling ====
- UCI ProTour:
  - Tour de Pologne:
    - Stage 6: (1) Edvald Boasson Hagen (NOR) (Team Columbia–HTC) 4h 03' 40" (2) Alessandro Ballan (ITA) (Lampre–NGC) same time (3) Marco Marcato (ITA) (Vacansoleil Pro Cycling Team) s.t.
    - General classification: (1) Ballan 25h 50' 34" (2) Daniel Moreno (ESP) (Caisse d'Epargne) + 10" (3) Hagen + 11"

==== Volleyball ====
- FIVB World Grand Prix:
  - 2nd Preliminary round:
    - Pool D in Miaoli, Chinese Taipei:
      - United States 3–2 Dominican Republic
      - Netherlands 3–1 Germany
    - Pool E in Macau:
      - Brazil 3–0 Thailand
      - China 3–2 Poland
    - Pool F in Osaka, Japan:
      - South Korea 2–3 Russia
      - Japan 3–0 Puerto Rico
    - Standing after 4 matches: Brazil, China, Netherlands 8 points, Russia 7, Germany, USA, Thailand 6, Poland, Japan, Dominican Republic 5, Puerto Rico, Korea 4.

=== August 6, 2009 (Thursday) ===
==== Basketball ====
- African Championship in Libya: (teams in **bold** advance to the second round)
  - Group A in Benghazi:
    - Ivory Coast 73–64 Libya
    - South Africa 49–97 **Nigeria**
  - Group B in Benghazi:
    - **Egypt** 69–79 **Angola**
    - **Mali** 67–54 Mozambique
  - Group C in Tripoli:
    - Congo 56–70 **Cameroon**
    - Central African Republic 69–82 **Senegal**
  - Group D in Tripoli:
    - Rwanda 77–67 Cape Verde
    - Tunisia 98–79 Morocco
- Asian Championship in Tianjin, China:
  - Group A:
    - Philippines 115–31 Sri Lanka
    - South Korea 95–74 Japan
  - Group B:
    - Iran 71–67 Chinese Taipei
    - Kuwait 69–64 Uzbekistan
  - Group C:
    - Kazakhstan 62–77 Qatar
    - India 49–121 China
  - Group D:
    - Indonesia 63–68 (OT) United Arab Emirates
    - Lebanon 67–84 Jordan

==== Cycling ====
- UCI ProTour:
  - Tour de Pologne:
    - Stage 5: (1) Alessandro Ballan (ITA) (Lampre–NGC) 3h 48' 23" (2) Daniel Moreno (ESP) (Caisse d'Epargne) same time (3) Pieter Weening (NED) (Rabobank) s.t.
    - General classification: (1) Ballan 21h 47' 00" (2) Moreno + 4" (3) Weening + 6"

==== Football (soccer) ====
- UEFA Europa League Third qualifying round, second leg: (teams in **bold** advance to the Play-off Round, first leg result in parentheses)
  - Krylia Sovetov (Russia) 3–2 (0–1) (Republic of Ireland) **St Patrick's Athletic**. 3–3 on aggregate; St Patrick's Athletic win on away goals.
  - **Karabakh** (Azerbaijan) 2–1 (1–0) (Finland) Honka. Karabakh win 3–1 on aggregate.
  - **Košice** (Slovakia) 3–1 (2–0) (Bosnia and Herzegovina) Slavija. Košice win 5–1 on aggregate.
  - **Slovan Liberec** (Czech Republic) 2–0 (1–0) (Liechtenstein) Vaduz. Slovan Liberec win 3–0 on aggregate.
  - Cherno More (Bulgaria) 0–1 (0–1) (Netherlands) **PSV Eindhoven**. PSV Eindhoven win 2–0 on aggregate.
  - **Lech Poznań** (Poland) 1–2 (6–1) (Norway) Fredrikstad. Lech Poznań win 7–3 on aggregate.
  - **Hapoel Tel Aviv** (Israel) 1–1 (3–1) (Sweden) IFK Göteborg. Hapoel Tel Aviv win 4–2 on aggregate.
  - Slaven Belupo (Croatia) 0–2 (1–2) (Norway) **Tromsø**. Tromsø win 4–1 on aggregate.
  - Lahti (Finland) 1–1 (2–3) (Belgium) **Club Brugge**. Club Brugge win 4–3 on aggregate.
  - **Lille** (France) 2–0 (2–0) (Serbia) Sevojno. Lille win 4–0 on aggregate.
  - **Sturm Graz** (Austria) 5–0 (2–1) (Montenegro) Petrovac. Sturm Graz win 7–1 on aggregate.
  - APOP (Cyprus) 2–2 (ET) (1–2) (Austria) **Rapid Wien**. Rapid Wien win 4–3 on aggregate.
  - **Austria Wien** 4–2 (1–1) (Serbia) Vojvodina. Austria Wien win 5–3 on aggregate.
  - **Basel** (Switzerland) 3–1 (2–2) (Iceland) KR. Basel win 5–3 on aggregate.
  - Young Boys (Switzerland) 1–2 (1–0) (Spain) **Athletic Bilbao**. 2–2 on aggregate; Athletic Bilbao win on away goals.
  - **Galatasaray** (Turkey) 6–0 (4–1) (Israel) Maccabi Netanya. Galatasaray win 10–1 on aggregate.
  - Legia Warsaw (Poland) 2–2 (1–1) (Denmark) **Brøndby**. 3–3 on aggregate; Brøndby win on away goals.
  - Derry City (Republic of Ireland) 1–1 (0–1) (Bulgaria) **CSKA Sofia**. CSKA Sofia win 2–1 on aggregate.
  - Interblock Ljubljana (Slovenia) 0–3 (0–2) (Ukraine) **Metalurh Donetsk**. Metalurh Donetsk win 5–0 on aggregate.
  - **NAC Breda** (Netherlands) 3–1 (1–0) (Poland) Polonia Warsaw. NAC Breda win 4–1 on aggregate.
  - Budapest Honvéd (Hungary) 1–1 (1–5) (Turkey) **Fenerbahçe**. Fenerbahçe win 6–2 on aggregate.
  - **Sigma Olomouc** (Czech Republic) 3–0 (5–1) (Scotland) Aberdeen. Sigma Olomouc win 8–1 on aggregate.
  - **Metalist Kharkiv** (Ukraine) 2–0 (2–1) (Croatia) Rijeka. Metalist Kharkiv win 4–1 on aggregate.
  - **Elfsborg** (Sweden) 2–0 (2–1) (Portugal) Braga. Elfsborg win 4–1 on aggregate.
  - **Odense** (Denmark) 3–0 (4–3) (North Macedonia) Rabotnički. Odense win 7–3 on aggregate.
  - **Sarajevo** (Bosnia and Herzegovina) 2–1 (ET) (Sweden) Helsingborg. 3–3 on aggregate; Sarajevo win 5–4 in penalty shootout.
  - **Hamburg** (Germany) 0–1 (4–0) (Denmark) Randers. Hamburg win 4–1 on aggregate.
  - Gent (Belgium) 1–7 (1–3) (Italy) **Roma**. Roma win 10–2 on aggregate.
  - **PAOK** (Greece) 0–1 (2–1) (Norway) Vålerenga. 2–2 on aggregate; PAOK win on away goals.
  - Motherwell (Scotland) 1–3 (0–3) (Romania) **Steaua București**. Steaua București win 6–1 on aggregate.
  - **Red Star Belgrade** (Serbia) 5–2 (0–2) (Georgia (country)) Dinamo Tbilisi. Red Star Belgrade win 5–4 on aggregate.
  - Hajduk Split (Croatia) 0–1 (1–1) (Slovakia) **MŠK Žilina**. MŠK Žilina win 2–1 on aggregate.
  - **Fulham** (England) 3–0 (3–0) (Lithuania) Vėtra. Fulham win 6–0 on aggregate.
  - Paços de Ferreira (Portugal) 0–1 (0–1) (Israel) **Bnei Yehuda**. Bnei Yehuda win 2–0 on aggregate.
- Copa Sudamericana First Stage, first leg:
  - Alianza Atlético (Peru) 0–0 (Venezuela) Deportivo Anzoátegui

=== August 5, 2009 (Wednesday) ===
==== Basketball ====
- African Championship in Libya:
  - Group A in Benghazi:
    - Libya 88–72 South Africa
    - Nigeria 93–84 Ivory Coast
  - Group B in Benghazi:
    - Angola 79–74 Mali
    - Mozambique 62–72 Egypt
  - Group C in Tripoli:
    - Cameroon 79–69 Central African Republic
    - Senegal 95–68 Congo
  - Group D in Tripoli:
    - Cape Verde 71–52 Tunisia
    - Morocco 85–84 Rwanda
- EuroBasket qualification additional qualifying round:
  - Group A: Portugal 56–62 Bosnia and Herzegovina
  - Group B: Italy 77–80 (OT) France

==== Cycling ====
- UCI ProTour:
  - Tour de Pologne:
    - Stage 4: (1) Edvald Boasson Hagen (NOR) (Team Columbia–HTC) 5h 25' 55" (2) Jürgen Roelandts (BEL) (Silence–Lotto) same time (3) Danilo Napolitano (ITA) (Team Katusha) s.t.
    - General classification: (1) Roelandts 17h 58' 31" (2) Borut Božič (SLO) (Vacansoleil Pro Cycling Team) + 6" (3) Jacopo Guarnieri (ITA) (Liquigas) s.t.

==== Football (soccer) ====
- UEFA Champions League Third qualifying round, second leg: (teams in **bold** advance to the Play-off Round, first leg result in parentheses)
  - Champions path:
    - BATE Borisov (Belarus) 2–1 (0–1) (Latvia) **Ventspils**. 2–2 on aggregate, Ventspils win on away goals rule.
    - **Levski Sofia** (Bulgaria) 2–0 (0–0) (Azerbaijan) Baku. Levski win 2–0 on aggregate.
    - **Debrecen** (Hungary) 1–0 (1–0) (Estonia) Levadia. Debrecen win 2–0 on aggregate.
    - Slavia Prague (Czech Republic) 1–1 (0–0) (Moldova) **Sheriff Tiraspol**. 1–1 on aggregate, Tiraspol win on away goals rule.
    - Maribor (Slovenia) 0–3 (3–2) (Switzerland) **Zürich**. Zürich win 5–3 on aggregate.
    - Partizan (Serbia) 1–0 (0–2) (Cyprus) **APOEL**. APOEL win 2–1 on aggregate.
    - **Olympiacos** (Greece) 2–0 (2–0) (Slovakia) Slovan Bratislava. Olympiacos win 4–0 on aggregate.
    - Stabæk (Norway) 0–0 (1–3) (Denmark) **Copenhagen**. Copenhagen win 3–1 on aggregate.
  - Non-champions path:
    - Dynamo Moscow (Russia) 0–2 (1–0) (Scotland) **Celtic**. Celtic win 2–1 on aggregate.
    - **Timişoara** (Romania) 0–0 (2–2) (Ukraine) Shakhtar Donetsk. 2–2 on aggregate, Timişoara win on away goals rule.
- Copa Sudamericana First Stage, first leg:
  - La Equidad (Colombia) 2–2 (Chile) Unión Española
  - Zamora (Venezuela) 0–1 (Ecuador) Emelec
- North American SuperLiga Final in Bridgeview, Illinois:
  - Chicago Fire (United States) 1–1 (ET) (Mexico) UANL. UANL win 4–3 in penalty shootout.
- Copa Chile Fourth round:
  - Selección Rapa Nui 0–4 Colo-Colo
    - This is the first professional match on Easter Island. (MercoPress)

=== August 4, 2009 (Tuesday) ===
==== Cycling ====
- UCI ProTour:
  - Tour de Pologne:
    - Stage 3: (1) Jacopo Guarnieri (ITA) (Liquigas) 5h 22' 31" (2) Allan Davis (AUS) (Quick-Step) s.t. (3) André Greipel (GER) (Team Columbia–HTC) s.t.
    - General classification: (1) Greipel 12h 32' 42" (2) Guarnieri s.t. (3) Borut Božič (SLO) (Vacansoleil Pro Cycling Team) s.t.

==== Football (soccer) ====
- UEFA Champions League Third qualifying round, second leg: (teams in **bold** advance to the Play-off Round, first leg result in parentheses)
  - Champions path:
    - **Maccabi Haifa** (Israel) 4–3 (0–0) (Kazakhstan) Aktobe. Haifa rally from 3 goals down to win 4–3 on aggregate.
    - Dinamo Zagreb (Croatia) 1–2 (1–1) (Austria) **Red Bull Salzburg**. Salzburg win 3–2 on aggregate.
  - Non-champions path:
    - Sivasspor (Turkey) 3–1 (0–5) (Belgium) **Anderlecht**. Anderlecht win 6–3 on aggregate.
    - **Panathinaikos** (Greece) 3–0 (1–3) (Czech Republic) Sparta Prague. Panathinaikos win 4–3 on aggregate.
    - Twente (Netherlands) 1–1 (0–0) (Portugal) **Sporting CP**. Aggregate 1–1, Sporting win on away goals rule.
- UEFA Europa League Third qualifying round, second leg: (teams in **bold** advance to the Play-off Round, first leg result in parentheses)
  - Omonia (Cyprus) 1–1 (0–2) (Romania) **Vaslui**. Vaslui win 3–1 on aggregate.
- Copa Sudamericana First Stage, first leg:
  - Universidad de Chile 2–1 (Colombia) Deportivo Cali

==== Racquetball ====
- European Championships in Paris:
  - Men:
    - Semifinals:
      - Ireland 0–3 Germany
      - Catalonia 2–1 Netherlands
    - 3rd place:
      - (bronze) Ireland 2–1 Netherlands
    - Final:
      - (gold) Catalonia 2–1 (silver) Germany
  - Women:
    - Germany 1–2 Catalonia
    - Ireland 0–3 Germany
      - Final standing: (gold) Catalonia (silver) Germany (bronze) Ireland

=== August 3, 2009 (Monday) ===
==== Auto racing ====
- Sprint Cup Series:
  - Pennsylvania 500 in Long Pond, Pennsylvania:
    - (1) Denny Hamlin (Virginia) (Toyota, Joe Gibbs Racing) (2) Juan Pablo Montoya (Colombia) (Chevrolet, Earnhardt Ganassi Racing) (3) Clint Bowyer (Kansas) (Chevrolet, Richard Childress Racing)
      - Drivers' standings (after 21 of 26 races leading to the Chase for the Sprint Cup): (1) Tony Stewart (Indiana) 3188 points (Chevrolet, Stewart Haas Racing) (2) Jimmie Johnson (California) 2991 (Chevrolet, Hendrick Motorsports) (3) Jeff Gordon (California) 2989 (Chevrolet, Hendrick Motorsports)

==== Cricket ====
- Australia in England:
  - The Ashes Series:
    - 3rd Test in Birmingham, day 5:
      - Australia 263 & 375/5d (112.2 overs, Michael Clarke 103*); England 376. **Match drawn. England lead 5-match series 1–0.**
- Pakistan in Sri Lanka:
  - 3rd ODI in Dambulla:
    - Pakistan 288/8 (50 ov); Sri Lanka 289/4 (46.3 ov, Mahela Jayawardene 123). **Sri Lanka win by 6 wickets, and take an unassailable 3–0 lead in the 5-match series.**

==== Cycling ====
- UCI ProTour:
  - Tour de Pologne:
    - Stage 2: (1) Angelo Furlan (ITA) (Lampre–NGC) 4h 57' 25" (2) Jürgen Roelandts (BEL) (Silence–Lotto) s.t. (3) Juan José Haedo (ARG) (Team Saxo Bank) s.t.
    - General classification: (1) Borut Božič (SLO) (Vacansoleil Pro Cycling Team) 7h 10' 11" (2) Furlan s.t. (3) David Loosli (SWI) (Lampre–N.G.C.) + 1"

==== Racquetball ====
- European Championships in Paris:
  - Men: (teams in **bold** advance to the semifinals)
    - Group A:
      - Ireland 3–0 Belgium
      - Netherlands 3–0 Belgium
      - Ireland 2–1 Netherlands
        - Standings: **Ireland** 2–0, **Netherlands** 1–1, Belgium 0–2.
    - Group B:
      - Germany 3–0 Italy
      - Catalonia 3–0 France
      - Germany 3–0 France
      - Catalonia 3–0 Italy
      - Catalonia 2–1 Germany
      - France 1–2 Italy
        - Standings: **Catalonia** 3–0, **Germany** 2–1, Italy 1–2, France 0–3.
  - Women:
    - Ireland 1–2 Catalonia

=== August 2, 2009 (Sunday) ===
==== Auto racing ====
- Sprint Cup Series:
  - Pennsylvania 500 in Long Pond, Pennsylvania:
    - Postponed to Monday due to rain.
- World Rally Championship:
  - Rally Finland:
    - (1) Mikko Hirvonen Finland (Ford Focus RS WRC 09) 2:50:40.9 (2) Sébastien Loeb (FRA) (Citroën C4 WRC) 2:51:06.0 (3) Jari-Matti Latvala (FIN) (Ford Focus RS WRC 09) 2:51:30.8
      - Drivers' standings (after 9 of 12 races): (1) Hirvonen 68 points (2) Loeb 65 (3) Dani Sordo (ESP) (Citroën C4 WRC) 44
      - Manufacturers' standings: (1) Citroën Total World Rally Team 119 points (2) BP Ford World Rally Team 105 (3) Stobart M-Sport Ford Rally Team 64
- V8 Supercars:
  - Norton 360 Sandown Challenge in Melbourne, Victoria:
    - Round 14: (1) Garth Tander (AUS) (Holden Commodore) (2) Will Davison (AUS) (Holden Commodore) (3) Craig Lowndes (AUS) (Ford Falcon)
      - Standings (after 14 of 26 races): (1) Whincup 1791 points (2) Davison 1674 (3) Tander 1416

==== Cricket ====
- Australia in England:
  - The Ashes Series:
    - 3rd Test in Birmingham, day 4:
      - Australia 263 & 88/2 (28.0 ov); England 376. Australia trail by 25 runs with 8 wickets remaining.
- Bangladesh in West Indies:
  - Only T20I in Basseterre, St Kitts:
    - Bangladesh 118/9 (20/20 ov); West Indies 119/5 (16.5/20 ov). **West Indies win by 5 wickets**.
      - This is Bangladesh only loss of the tour.

==== Cycling ====
- UCI ProTour:
  - Tour de Pologne:
    - Stage 1: (1) Borut Božič (SLO) (Vacansoleil Pro Cycling Team) 2h 12' 56" (2) André Greipel (GER) (Team Columbia–HTC) s.t. (3) Francesco Gavazzi (ITA) (Lampre–NGC) s.t.

==== Football (soccer) ====
- UEFA Under-19 Championship in Ukraine:
  - Final: England 0–2 **Ukraine**
    - Ukraine win their first ever football trophy.
- CAF Champions League group stage, matchday 2:
  - Group B:
    - Heartland (Nigeria) 3–1 (Zimbabwe) Monomotapa United

==== Golf ====
- Women's majors:
  - Women's British Open in Lytham St Annes, England:
    - (1) Catriona Matthew (SCO) 285 (−3) (2) Karrie Webb (AUS) 288 (E) (3) Paula Creamer, Christina Kim (both United States), Hee-Won Han (KOR) & Ai Miyazato (JPN) 289 (+1)
      - Matthew becomes the first Scot ever to win a women's major.
- Senior majors:
  - U.S. Senior Open in Carmel, Indiana:
    - (1) Fred Funk (USA) 268 (−20) (2) Joey Sindelar (USA) 274 (−14) (3) Russ Cochran (USA) 276 (−12)
      - Funk wins his second senior major, and sets a new to-par scoring record for the event.
- PGA Tour:
  - Buick Open in Grand Blanc, Michigan:
    - Winner: Tiger Woods (USA) 268 (−20)
      - Woods bounces back from missing the cut at the Open Championship, cruising to his fourth win of the year by three shots.
- European Tour:
  - Czech Golf Open in Prague, Czech Republic:
    - Winner: Oskar Henningsson (SWE) 275 (−13)
      - Henningsson collects his first career European Tour win.

==== Swimming ====
- World Aquatics Championships in Rome, Italy:
  - Men's 50m backstroke: (gold) Liam Tancock (GBR) 24.04 WR (silver) Junya Koga (JPN) 24.24 (bronze) Gerhard Zandberg (RSA) 24.34
  - Women's 50m breaststroke: (gold) Yuliya Yefimova (RUS) 30.09 WR (silver) Rebecca Soni (USA) 30.11 (bronze) Sarah Katsoulis (AUS) 30.16
  - Men's 400m individual medley: (gold) Ryan Lochte (USA) 4:07.01 (silver) Tyler Clary (USA) 4:07.31 (bronze) László Cseh (HUN) 4:07.37
  - Women's 50m freestyle: (gold) Britta Steffen (GER) 23.73 WR (silver) Therese Alshammar (SWE) 23.88 (bronze) Cate Campbell (AUS) & Marleen Veldhuis (NED) 23.99
  - Men's 1500m freestyle: (gold) Oussama Mellouli (TUN) 14:37.28 (silver) Ryan Cochrane (CAN) 14:41.38 (bronze) Sun Yang (CHN) 14:46.84
  - Women's 400m individual medley: (gold) Katinka Hosszú (HUN) 4:30.31 (silver) Kirsty Coventry (ZIM) 4:32.12 (bronze) Stephanie Rice (AUS) 4:32.29
  - Men's 4 × 100 m medley relay: (gold) United States (Aaron Peirsol 52.19 CR, Eric Shanteau, Michael Phelps, David Walters) 3:27.28 WR (silver) Germany (Helge Meeuw 52.27 ER, Hendrik Feldwehr, Benjamin Starke, Paul Biedermann) 3:28.58 (bronze) Australia (Ashley Delaney, Brenton Rickard, Andrew Lauterstein, Matt Targett) 3:28.64
    - The world championships conclude with a total of 43 world records, the most in any swimming event in history.

==== Tennis ====
- ATP World Tour:
  - Allianz Suisse Open Gstaad in Gstaad, Switzerland:
    - Final: Thomaz Bellucci (BRA) bt Andreas Beck (GER) 6–4, 7–6 (2)
      - Bellucci wins his first ATP Tour title.
  - LA Tennis Open in Los Angeles, United States:
    - Final: Sam Querrey (USA) bt Carsten Ball (AUS) 6–4, 3–6, 6–1
      - Querrey wins his first title of the year and second of his career.
  - ATP Studena Croatia Open Umag in Umag, Croatia
    - Final: Nikolay Davydenko (RUS) bt Juan Carlos Ferrero (ESP) 6–3, 6–0
      - Davydenko wins his second title of the year and 16th of his career.
- WTA Tour:
  - Bank of the West Classic in Stanford, California, United States:
    - Final: Marion Bartoli (FRA) bt Venus Williams (USA) 6–2, 5–7, 6–4
      - Bartoli wins her second title of the year and fifth of her career.
  - İstanbul Cup in Istanbul, Turkey:
    - Final: Vera Dushevina (RUS) bt Lucie Hradecká (CZE) 6–0, 6–1
      - Dushevina wins her first WTA Tour title.

==== Volleyball ====
- FIVB World Grand Prix:
  - 1st Preliminary round:
    - Pool A in Rio de Janeiro, Brazil:
      - Brazil 3–0 United States
      - Puerto Rico 2–3 Germany
    - Pool B in Kielce, Poland:
      - Poland 3–0 Japan
      - Netherlands 3–1 Thailand
    - Pool C in Ningbo, China:
      - South Korea 2–3 Dominican Republic
      - China 3–2 Russia
    - Standings after 3 matches: Brazil, China, Netherlands 6 points, Russia, Germany, Thailand 5, Poland, Dominican Republic, USA 4, Puerto Rico, Japan, Korea 3.

=== August 1, 2009 (Saturday) ===
==== Auto racing ====
- IndyCar Series:
  - Meijer Indy 300 in Sparta, Kentucky:
    - (1) Ryan Briscoe (AUS) (Penske Racing) 1:28:24.3246 (2) Ed Carpenter (USA) (Vision Racing) + 0.0162* (3) Tony Kanaan (BRA) (Andretti Green Racing)
      - Drivers' standings (after 12 of 17 races): (1) Briscoe 416 points (2) Scott Dixon (NZL) (Chip Ganassi Racing) 408 (3) Dario Franchitti (GBR) (Chip Ganassi Racing) 405
- Nationwide Series:
  - U.S. Cellular 250 in Newton, Iowa:
    - (1) Brad Keselowski (Michigan) (Chevrolet, JR Motorsports) (2) Kyle Busch (Nevada) (Toyota, Joe Gibbs Racing) (3) Jason Leffler (California) (Toyota, Braun Racing)
- V8 Supercars:
  - Norton 360 Sandown Challenge in Melbourne, Victoria:
    - Round 13: (1) Will Davison (AUS) (Holden Commodore) (2) James Courtney (AUS) (Ford Falcon) (3) Craig Lowndes (AUS) (Ford Falcon)
      - Standings (after 13 of 26 races): (1) Jamie Whincup (AUS) (Ford Falcon) 1662 points (2) Davison 1536 (3) Garth Tander (AUS) (Holden Commodore) 1266

==== Cricket ====
- Australia in England:
  - The Ashes Series:
    - 3rd Test in Birmingham, day 3:
      - No play due to rain.
- Pakistan in Sri Lanka:
  - 2nd ODI in Dambulla:
    - Pakistan 168 (47 ov); Sri Lanka 169/4 (43.4 ov). **Sri Lanka win by 6 wickets. Sri Lanka lead the 5-match series 2–0**

==== Cycling ====
- UCI ProTour:
  - Clásica de San Sebastián:
    - (1) Carlos Barredo (ESP) (Quick-Step) 5h 37' 00" (2) Roman Kreuziger (CZE) (Liquigas) s.t. (3) Mickaël Delage (FRA) (Silence–Lotto) + 7"

==== Football (soccer) ====
- CAF Champions League group stage, matchday 2:
  - Group A:
    - Kano Pillars (Nigeria) 3–1 (Sudan) Al-Merreikh
  - Group B:
    - Étoile du Sahel (Tunisia) 2–1 (Democratic Republic of the Congo) TP Mazembe

==== Golf ====
- Women's majors:
  - Women's British Open in Lytham St Annes, England, third round:
    - Leaderboard: (1) Catriona Matthew (SCO) 212 (−4) (2) Christina Kim (USA) 215 (−1) (3) Jiyai Shin (KOR) & Ai Miyazato (JPN) 216 (E)
- Senior majors:
  - U.S. Senior Open in Carmel, Indiana, third round:
    - Leaderboard: (1) Fred Funk (USA) 203 (−13) (2) Greg Norman (AUS) & Joey Sindelar (USA) 204 (−12)

==== Rugby union ====
- Tri Nations Series:
  - South Africa 31–19 New Zealand in Durban
    - Morné Steyn scores all of the Springboks' points, breaking the record of former All Black Andrew Mehrtens for most individual points in a Tri Nations match. Also, the Boks' John Smit makes his 60th appearance as a Test captain, giving him sole possession of the all-time lead.
    - Standings: South Africa 8 points (2 matches), New Zealand 4 (3 matches), Australia 1 (1 match).

==== Swimming ====
- World Aquatics Championships in Rome, Italy:
  - Women's 50m butterfly: (gold) Marieke Guehrer (AUS) 25.48 (silver) Zhou Yafei (CHN) 25.57 (bronze) Ingvild Snildal (NOR) 25.58
  - Men's 50m freestyle: (gold) César Cielo Filho (BRA) 21.08 CR AM (silver) Frédérick Bousquet (FRA) 21.21 (bronze) Amaury Leveaux (FRA) 21.25
  - Women's 200m backstroke: (gold) Kirsty Coventry (ZIM) 2:04.81 WR (silver) Anastasia Zuyeva (RUS) 2:04.94 (bronze) Elisabeth Beisel (USA) 2:06.39
  - Men's 100m butterfly: (gold) Michael Phelps (USA) 49.82 WR (silver) Milorad Čavić (SRB) 49.95 (bronze) Rafael Muñoz (ESP) 50.41
  - Women's 800m freestyle: (gold) Lotte Friis (DEN) 8:15.92 CR (silver) Joanne Jackson (GBR) 8:16.66 (bronze) Alessia Filippi (ITA) 8:17.21
  - Women's 4 × 100 m medley relay: (gold) China (Zhao Jing, Chen Huijia, Jiao Liuyang, Li Zhesi) 3:52.19 WR (silver) Australia (Emily Seebohm, Sarah Katsoulis, Jessicah Schipper, Lisbeth Trickett) 3:52.58 (bronze) Germany (Daniela Samulski, Sarah Poewe, Annika Mehlhorn, Britta Steffen) 3:55.79 ER
  - Men's 50m backstroke semifinals: (1) Liam Tancock (GBR) 24.08 WR
  - Women's 50m breaststroke semifinals: (1) Sarah Katsoulis (AUS) 30.33
  - Women's 50m freestyle semifinals: (1) Cate Campbell (AUS) 24.08

==== Volleyball ====
- FIVB World Grand Prix:
  - 1st Preliminary round:
    - Pool A in Rio de Janeiro, Brazil:
      - Brazil 3–0 Germany
      - Puerto Rico 2–3 United States
    - Pool B in Kielce, Poland:
      - Poland 0–3 Netherlands
      - Thailand 3–2 Japan
    - Pool C in Ningbo, China:
      - Dominican Republic 2–3 Russia
      - China 3–0 South Korea
        - China, Brazil, Netherlands, Russia and Thailand all win their two opening matches.

==== Water polo ====
- World Aquatics Championships in Rome, Italy:
  - Men:
    - Bronze Medal Match: (bronze) Croatia 8–6 United States
    - Gold Medal Match: (gold) Serbia 7–7 (Pen 7–6) (silver) Spain
