= Irish cricket team in Scotland in 2009 =

	Ireland	Scotland
- Dates: August 17 – August 23, 2009
Captains	William Porterfield	Gavin Hamilton

One Day International series
- Results: Ireland won the 2-match series 1–0
Most runs	William Porterfield 50	Gavin Hamilton 36
Most wickets	Regan West 4	Gordon Drummond & Majid Haq & Ryan Watson 2

The Ireland cricket team toured Scotland in 2009. They played two One Day Internationals and an Intercontinental Cup match against Scotland.

== Intercontinental Cup Match ==
17 August - 20 August
(scorecard)

Ireland	v	Scotland
202 all out (66.1 overs); William Porterfield 77 (121); Regan West 7/88 (29.4 overs)		208 all out (82.4 overs); Qasim Sheikh 100* (215); Majid Haq 5/30 (19.1 overs)
303 all out (106.1 overs); William Porterfield 118 (304); Andre Botha 2/16 (6 overs)		72/5 (31.0 overs); Qasim Sheikh 17 (43); Gordon Goudie 4/61 (19.1 overs)

Match Drawn
Mannofield Park, Aberdeen, Scotland
Umpires: Paul Baldwin (GER) & Ian Ramage

- Scotland won the toss and chose to field.

== ODI series ==
=== 1st ODI ===
22 August
(scorecard)

Ireland; 205/9 (50 overs)	v	Scotland; 109 (40.3 overs)
William Porterfield 50 (76); Majid Haq 2/18 (10 overs)		Gavin Hamilton 36 (91); Regan West 4/26 (8.3 overs)

Ireland won by 96 runs.
Mannofield Park, Aberdeen, Scotland
Umpires: Tony Hill (NZL) & Ian Ramage (SCO)

=== 2nd ODI ===
23 August
(scorecard)

Scotland	v	Ireland

Match abandoned without a ball bowled.
Mannofield Park, Aberdeen, Scotland

- Match abandoned due to rain.
