= 2009 European Women's Fistball Championship =

- 2009 Women's European Fistball Championships
Host	Zofingen Switzerland
Dates	August 14–15
Teams	5 national teams
- Final rankings
Champions	Switzerland
Runners-up	Austria
Third place	Germany
- Tournament statistics
Matches	14

The 2009 Women's European Fistball Championship was held in Zofingen (Switzerland) from August 14 to 15, with five women's national teams: Austria, Catalonia, Germany, Italy and Switzerland.

The first round was played as the best of 3 sets (11 points) and the rest of competition was played as the best of 5 sets.

Switzerland were the champions.

== Teams ==
Switzerland
Michelle Fedier
Andrea Gerber
Irene Schönenberger
Simone Estermann
Natalie Berchtold
Madleina Rüegge
Nicole Münzing
Nadin Schneider

Austria
Antonia Ritschel
Ines Mayer
Magdalena Lindorfer
Karin Azesberger
Zeller Nicole
Elisabeth Ojo
Katharina Arthold
Susanne Hartl

Germany
M. Therese Warnick
Janine Mertsch
Cindy Nökel
Janna Meiners
Eva Krämer
Annika Lohse
Stenzel Silja
Bettina Bering

Italy
Diana Pfingste
Anna Frenes
Juliane Windegger
Juli Stauder
Tina Meran
Lisi Lang
Jasmin Mayr
Gabi Hofer
Lisa Seifert
Christa Larcher

Catalonia
Laura Jordan
Anna Martinez
Anna Albesa
Roser Dols
María Pérez
Marta Jordan
Beatriz Mínguez

== First round ==
	Pts	P	W	L	S+	S-
Austria *	8	4	4	0	8	1
Switzerland	6	4	3	1	7	2
Germany	4	4	2	2	4	4
Italy	2	4	1	3	2	6
Catalonia	0	4	0	4	0	8

* Austria is classified to the final

10:00	Switzerland	Catalonia	2-0	(11-04 / 11-03)
10:00	Germany	Italy	2-0	(11-03 / 11-03)
11:30	Switzerland	Italy	2-0	(11-01 / 11-01)
11:30	Austria	Catalonia	2-0	(11-02 / 11-02)
13:00	Switzerland	Austria	1-2	(04-11 / 13-11 / 06-11)
13:00	Germany	Catalonia	2-0	(11-03 / 11-03)
14:30	Austria	Germany	2-0	(11-05 / 11-06)
14:30	Italy	Catalonia	2-0	(11-06 / 11-08)
16:00	Switzerland	Germany	2-0	(11-06 / 11-09)
16:00	Austria	Italy	2-0	(11-04 / 11-04)

== Qualification round ==
- Top team qualified in the first round (Austria) goes to the final.
- 2nd and 3rd qualified teams (Switzerland and Germany) play to reach the final.
- 4th and 5th qualified teams (Italy and Catalonia) play to decide the 5th place.
- Loser of 2nd-3rd qualified (Germany) plays against the winner of 4th-5th qualified (Italy) for 3rd-4th places.
- Matches in this round are played as the best of 5 sets (11 points).

4th-5th qualified teams
4th-5th qualified teams	Italy	3-0	Catalonia	Zofingen; August 15 - 09:45
4th-5th qualified teams	11-6, 11-8, 11-3			Zofingen; August 15 - 09:45

2nd-3rd qualified teams
2nd-3rd qualified teams	Switzerland	3-1	Germany	Zofingen; August 15 - 10:45
2nd-3rd qualified teams	11-7, 11-7, 6-11, 11-6			Zofingen; August 15 - 10:45

Rank 3/4
Rank 3/4	Germany	3-0	Italy	Zofingen; August 15 - 13:15
Rank 3/4	11-2, 11-7, 11-4			Zofingen; August 15 - 13:15

FINAL
FINAL	Austria	1-3	Switzerland	Zofingen; August 15 - 15:45
FINAL	9-11, 3-11, 11-6, 8-11			Zofingen; August 15 - 15:45

Winners
SWITZERLAND

== Final standings ==
Final standings
1	Switzerland
2	Austria
3	Germany
4	Italy
5	Catalonia
