= 2009 UCI ProTour =

Road cycling series

- Fifth edition of the UCI ProTour

Details
- Dates: 20 January – 23 August
- Location: Australia and Europe
- Races: 14

The 2009 UCI ProTour was the fifth series of the UCI ProTour. Two new teams, the American Garmin–Slipstream and the Russian Team Katusha, joined the ProTour, effectively taking over the licenses of Crédit Agricole and Gerolsteiner. Two existing teams changed title sponsors: Team CSC from Denmark became Team Saxo Bank, and Saunier Duval–Scott changed name to Fuji–Servetto. As in 2008, the races organized by the three Grand Tour organizers were not part of the ProTour. Rather than a ranking based only on the ProTour, the UCI designed a World Calendar, on which the Monument events and Grand Tours were included, with a corresponding 2009 UCI World Ranking.

The first race was the 2009 Tour Down Under in January, and the series ended with the 2009 GP Ouest-France in August.

== 2009 UCI ProTour races ==
Dates	Race	Winner	UCI World Ranking leader
20–25 January	(Australia) Tour Down Under	Allan Davis (AUS) (Quick-Step)	Allan Davis (AUS) (Quick-Step)
5 April	(Belgium) Tour of Flanders	Stijn Devolder (BEL) (Quick-Step)	Allan Davis (AUS) (Quick-Step)
8 April	(Belgium) Gent–Wevelgem	Edvald Boasson Hagen (NOR) (Team Columbia–High Road)	Allan Davis (AUS) (Quick-Step)
6–11 April	(Spain) Vuelta al País Vasco	Alberto Contador (ESP) (Astana)	Alberto Contador (ESP) (Astana)
19 April	(Netherlands) Amstel Gold Race	Serguei Ivanov (RUS) (Team Katusha)	Heinrich Haussler (GER) (Cervélo TestTeam)
28 April–3 May	(Switzerland) Tour de Romandie	Roman Kreuziger (CZE) (Liquigas)	Heinrich Haussler (GER) (Cervélo TestTeam)
18–24 May	(Spain) Volta a Catalunya	Alejandro Valverde (ESP) (Caisse d'Epargne)	Allan Davis (AUS) (Quick-Step)
7–14 June	(France) Dauphiné Libéré	Alejandro Valverde (ESP) (Caisse d'Epargne)	Alejandro Valverde (ESP) (Caisse d'Epargne)
13–21 June	(Switzerland) Tour de Suisse	Fabian Cancellara (SUI) (Team Saxo Bank)	Alejandro Valverde (ESP) (Caisse d'Epargne)
1 August	(Spain) Clásica de San Sebastián	Carlos Barredo (ESP) (Quick-Step)	Alberto Contador (ESP) (Astana)
2–8 August	(Poland) Tour de Pologne	Alessandro Ballan (ITA) (Lampre–NGC)	Alberto Contador (ESP) (Astana)
16 August	(Germany) Vattenfall Cyclassics	Tyler Farrar (USA) (Garmin–Slipstream)	Alberto Contador (ESP) (Astana)
20–27 August	(Belgium) / (Netherlands) Tour of Benelux	Edvald Boasson Hagen (NOR) (Team Columbia–High Road)	Alberto Contador (ESP) (Astana)
23 August	GP Ouest-France	Simon Gerrans (AUS) (Cervélo TestTeam)	Alberto Contador (ESP) (Astana)

== Teams ==
Code	Official Team Name	Country	Website
ALM	Ag2r–La Mondiale	France	
AST	Astana	Kazakhstan	
BTL	Bbox Bouygues Telecom	France	
COF	Cofidis	France	
EUS	Euskaltel–Euskadi	Spain	
FDJ	Française des Jeux	France	
FUJ	Fuji–Servetto	Spain	
GCE	Caisse d'Epargne	Spain	
GRM	Garmin–Slipstream	United States	
KAT	Team Katusha	Russia	
LAM	Lampre–NGC	Italy	
LIQ	Liquigas	Italy	
MRM	Team Milram	Germany	
QST	Quick-Step	Belgium	
RAB	Rabobank	Netherlands	
SAX	Team Saxo Bank	Denmark	
SIL	Silence–Lotto	Belgium	
THR	Team Columbia–HTC	United States	
