= Kenyan cricket team in Canada in 2009 =

	Kenya	Canada
- Dates: August 7 – August 16, 2009

One Day International series
- Results: Canada won the 3-match series 1–0
Most runs	Morris Ouma (43)	Rizwan Cheema (77)
Most wickets	Thomas Odoyo (4)	Khurram Chohan (4)

The Kenya cricket team toured Canada in 2009. They played three One Day Internationals and an Intercontinental Cup match against Canada.

== Intercontinental Cup Match ==
14 August – 17 August
Scorecard

Kenya	v	Canada
317 (86.1 overs); Steve Tikolo 158 (194); Henry Osinde 3/28 (12.1 overs)		234 (92.4 overs); Zameer Zahir 57 (131); Nehemiah Odhiambo 3/60 (20 overs)
362/3d (85 overs); Steve Tikolo 169 (207); Umar Bhatti 2/63 (15 overs)		198 (65.3 overs); Abdool Samad 87 (152); Hiren Varaiya 6/45 20.3 overs)

Kenya won by 247 runs
Maple Leaf Cricket Club, King City, Canada
Umpires: K Bayney (CAN) and NA Malcolm (WI)
Player of the match: Steve Tikolo

- Kenya won the toss and chose to bat

== ODI series ==
=== 1st ODI ===
19 August 2009
Scorecard

Kenya; 113 (33.1 overs)	v	Canada; 117/1 (16.2 overs)
Morris Ouma 43 (79); Khurram Chohan 4/26 (10 overs)		Rizwan Cheema 76 (38); Thomas Odoyo 1/10 (3 overs)

Canada won by 9 wickets
Maple Leaf Cricket Club, King City, Canada
Umpires: Karran Bayney & Norman Malcolm
Player of the match: Khurram Chohan

- Canada won the toss and elected to field

=== 2nd ODI ===
21 August
Scorecard

Canada	v	Kenya

Match abandoned
Maple Leaf Cricket Club, King City, Canada

- Match abandoned due to rain.

=== 3rd ODI ===
23 August
Scorecard

Canada	v	Kenya

Match abandoned
Maple Leaf Cricket Club, King City, Canada

- Match abandoned due to rain
