= Qasim Sheikh =

Personal information
- Full name: Mohammad Qasim Sheikh
- Born: 30 October 1984 (age 42); Glasgow, Scotland
- Batting: Left-handed
- Bowling: Left-arm medium

International information
- National side: Scotland (2008–2010)
- ODI debut (cap 32): 2 July 2008 v Ireland
- Last ODI: 15 June 2010 v Netherlands

Domestic team information
- Years: Team
- 2008/09: Pakistan Customs

Career statistics
Competition	ODI	FC	LA
Matches	7	16	13
Runs scored	63	691	85
Batting average	10.50	27.64	7.72
100s/50s	0/0	3/3	0/0
Top score	23	108	23
Catches/stumpings	2/–	3/–	3/–
- Source: CricketArchive, 27 January 2025

Mohammad Qasim Sheikh (born 30 October 1984) is a Scottish former cricketer. He played for Scotland and Pakistan Customs. He was born in Glasgow to Pakistani parents on 30 October 1984.

A left-handed batsman, he made his debut for Scotland in a game against the Netherlands in the 2005 ICC Intercontinental Cup. He had previously represented his country in the 2002 Under-19 World Cup in New Zealand.

In Scottish domestic cricket he has played for Clydesdale, the same club he joined when he was only seven years old. Sheikh has played for Clydesdale at every level from under-12s all the way through the ranks until he was selected for the 1st eleven, and in 2007 he went on to become the first Asian captain at the age of 22.

In 2009, Glasgow-born Sheikh became the first Scottish-born cricketer to score a first-class century in Pakistan, when he played for the Customs team through the winter. He has represented his country on more than 20 occasions, including the ICC World Twenty20 Championships in South Africa (2007) and England (2009).
