= Football at the 2009 Summer Universiade – Men's tournament =

Men's football at the XXV Summer Universiade
- Venue: Various
- Dates: June 30 – July 10, 2009

The men's tournament of football at the 2009 Summer Universiade at Serbia began on June 30 and ended on July 10.

== Teams ==
Africa	Americas	Asia	Europe	Automatic qualifiers
Ghana; Morocco	Brazil; Canada; Mexico; Uruguay	Japan; South Korea; Thailand	Czech Republic; France; Great Britain; Italy; Republic of Ireland; Ukraine	Serbia (Universiade hosts)

== Preliminary round ==
=== Group A ===
Team	Pld	W	D	L	GF	GA	GD	Pts
Great Britain	3	2	1	0	6	2	4	7
Serbia	3	2	0	1	6	1	5	6
Mexico	3	1	1	1	5	5	0	4
Ghana	3	0	0	3	0	9	-9	0

30 June 2009
10:30

Mexico	2–2	Great Britain
Cortés 24' (pen.); Pérez 39'	Report	Warren 34'; Sutherland 81'

Omladinski Stadium, Belgrade
Referee: Kim Jong-hyeok (South Korea)

30 June 2009
17:30

Serbia	3–0	Ghana
	3–0 Victory awarded to Serbia on forfeit

2 July 2009
10:30

Ghana	0–3	Mexico
	3–0 Victory awarded to Mexico on forfeit

2 July 2009
17:30

Great Britain	1–0	Serbia
Warren 69'	Report

Miloš Obilić Stadium, Belgrade
Referee: Andrea De Marco (Italy)

4 July 2009
17:30

Great Britain	3–0	Ghana
	3–0 Victory Awarded to Great Britain on Forfeit

4 July 2009
17:30

Serbia	3–0	Mexico
Marinković 11'; Kostić 90+4'; Ubiparip 90+5'	Report

Omladinski Stadium, Belgrade
Referee: Jiri Jech (Czech Republic)

=== Group B ===
Team	Pld	W	D	L	GF	GA	GD	Pts
Czech Republic	3	2	1	0	5	2	3	7
Ukraine	3	1	2	0	3	2	1	5
Canada	3	1	0	2	3	5	–2	3
Morocco	3	0	1	2	0	2	–2	1

30 June 2009
10:30

Ukraine	0–0	Morocco
	Report

Fortress Stadium, Smederevo
Referee: Aonruk Apisit (Thailand)

30 June 2009
17:30

Canada	1–3	Czech Republic
Scholefield 35'	Report	Smutný 14' (pen.); Smith 58' (o.g.); Blazej 90+3'

Fortress Stadium, Smederevo
Referee: Dimitar Meckarovski (North Macedonia)

2 July 2009
10:30

Morocco	0–1	Canada
	Report	Revivo 29'

Stadium FK Lokomotiva, Belgrade
Referee: Alan Black (United Kingdom)

2 July 2009
17:30

Czech Republic	1–1	Ukraine
Smutný 77'	Report	Starhorodskyi 84'

Stadium FK Lokomotiva, Belgrade
Referee: Jovan Kaludjerovic (Montenegro)

4 July 2009
17:30

Czech Republic	1–0	Morocco
Čejka 67'	Report

Miloš Obilić Stadium, Belgrade
Referee: Ryuji Sato (Japan)

5 July 2009
11:00

Ukraine	2–1	Canada
Shevchuk 10'; Krokhmalyuk 76'	Report	Revivo 41'

Fortress Stadium, Smederevo
Referee: Kim Jong-hyeok (South Korea)

=== Group C ===
Team	Pld	W	D	L	GF	GA	GD	Pts
South Korea	3	2	1	0	4	1	3	7
Italy	3	2	0	1	4	4	0	6
Uruguay	3	1	1	1	3	3	0	4
Republic of Ireland	3	0	0	3	1	4	-3	0

30 June 2009
17:30

Italy	0–2	South Korea
	Report report	Kim Bo-kyung 18'; Yun Young-sun 59'

Stadium FK Kolubara, Lazarevac
Referee: Silviu Petrescu (Canada)

30 June 2009
17:30

Uruguay	1–0	Republic of Ireland
Turnes 30'	Report

Stadion FK Indjija, Inđija
Referee: Ishalil Ronaissi (Morocco)

2 July 2009
10:30

South Korea	1–1	Uruguay
Kim Bo-kyung 45+'	Report	D'avila 38'

Stadium Voždovac, Belgrade
Referee: Francisco Chacón (Mexico)

2 July 2009
17:30

Republic of Ireland	1–2	Italy
McMahon 57'	Report report	D'Alessandro 21'; Lolaico 63'

Stadium Voždovac, Belgrade
Referee: Yurii Moseichuk (Ukraine)

4 July 2009
10:30

Republic of Ireland	0–1	South Korea
	Report	Lee Jae-min 64'

Stadion FK Indjija, Inđija
Referee: Ishalil Ronaissi (Morocco)

4 July 2009
10:30

Italy	2–1	Uruguay
Ramaglia 54', 90+1'	Report report	D'avila 30'

Stadium FK Srem Beograd, Belgrade
Referee: Dragomir Stankovic (Serbia)

=== Group D ===
Team	Pld	W	D	L	GF	GA	GD	Pts
Japan	3	3	0	0	11	2	9	9
France	3	1	1	1	6	3	3	4
Brazil	3	1	1	1	3	4	-1	4
Thailand	3	0	0	3	1	12	–11	0

30 June 2009
10:30

Thailand	0–2	Brazil
	Report	Ribeiro Jr. 43'; Sales Jr. 71' (pen.)

Stadium FK Srem Jakovo, Jakovo
Referee: Dragomir Stankovic (Serbia)

30 June 2009
17:30

Japan	2–1	France
Mishima 53'; Nagai 80'	Report	Pinto 70' (pen.)

Stadium FK Srem Jakovo, Jakovo
Referee: Jiri Jech (Czech Republic)

2 July 2009
10:30

Brazil	1–4	Japan
Ribeiro Jr. 17'	Report	Mitsuhira 36' (pen.); Nagai 58', 77', 90+3'

Železnik Stadium, Belgrade
Referee: Novo Panic (Bosnia and Herzegovina)

2 July 2009
17:30

France	5–1	Thailand
Pinto 11' (pen.), 34' (pen.); Vanoukia 41'; Oliveri 56'; Cangini 75'	Report	Sangsanoi 21' (pen.)

Železnik Stadium, Belgrade
Referee: Milorad Mazic (Serbia)

4 July 2009
17:30

France	0–0	Brazil
	Report

Stadium FK Lokomotiva, Belgrade
Referee: Silviu Petrescu (Canada)

4 July 2009
17:30

Thailand	0–5	Japan
	Report	Nagai 16', 30', 85'; Morimoto 54'; Kihara 77' (pen.)

Železnik Stadium, Belgrade
Referee: Dimitar Meckarovski (North Macedonia)

== Classification 9th–16th places ==
6 July 2009
10:30

Mexico	2–3	Thailand
Cortes 53', 65'	Report	Inthasen 15'; Tatong 34'; Domtaisong 37'

Omladinski Stadium, Belgrade
Referee: Yurii Moseichuk (Ukraine)

6 July 2009
10:30

Morocco	0–2	Uruguay
	Report	Suárez 17'; Carzolio 22'

Miloš Obilić Stadium, Belgrade
Referee: Jovan Kaludjerovic (Montenegro)

6 July 2009
17:30

Ghana	2–4	Brazil
Yawson 63'; Boateng 73'	Report	Ribeiro 45'; Reis 53'; Sales 58', 88' (pen.)

Stadium FK Kolubara, Lazarevac
Referee: Alan Black (United Kingdom)

6 July 2009
17:30

Canada	1–0	Republic of Ireland
Scholefield 63' (pen.)	Report

Stadium FK Makiš, Belgrade
Referee: William Selorm Agbovi (Ghana)

== Quarterfinals ==
6 July 2009
17:30

Great Britain	0–0	France
	Report
Penalties
	2–0

Omladinski Stadium, Belgrade
Referee: Milorad Mazic (Serbia)

6 July 2009
17:30

Ukraine	1–1	South Korea
Piskun 34'	Report	Park Jin-soo 67'
Penalties
	4–1

Miloš Obilić Stadium, Belgrade
Referee: Andrea De Marco (Italy)

6 July 2009
17:30

Serbia	0–0	Japan
	Report
Penalties
	2–3

Stadion FK Indjija, Inđija
Referee: Silviu Petrescu (Canada)

6 July 2009
17:30

Czech Republic	0–1	Italy
	Report report	Ramaglia 3'

Stadium FK Srem Jakovo, Jakovo
Referee: Novo Panic (Bosnia and Herzegovina)

== Classification round ==
=== Classification 13th–16th places ===
8 July 2009
10:30

Mexico	0–3	Morocco
	Report	Mezgouri 13'; Marzouk 73'; Kandoussi 77'

Stadium FK Lokomotiva, Belgrade
Referee: William Selorm Agbovi (Ghana)

8 July 2009
10:30

Ghana	1–4	Republic of Ireland
Yawson 7'	Report	O'Sullvian 19', 29', 56'; Cleary 69'

Fortress Stadium, Smederevo
Referee: Apisit Aonruk (Thailand)

=== Classification 9th–12th places ===
8 July 2009
10:30

Thailand	3–0	Uruguay
Papunga 8'; Thaensopa 87'; Pannasi 90+3'	Report

Stadium FK Srem Jakovo, Jakovo
Referee: Ryuji Sato (Japan)

8 July 2009
17:30

Brazil	3–1	Canada
Ribeiro 19'; Sales 24' (pen.) 36'	Report	Scholefield 83' (pen.)

Stadium FK Kolubara, Lazarevac
Referee: Francisco Chacón (Mexico)

=== Classification 5th–8th places ===
8 July 2009
17:30

France	2–3	South Korea
Cangini 30'; Quettier 41'	Report	Nam Joon-jae 10'; Kim Bo-kyung 28'; Choi Hyn-tae 81'

Stadium Voždovac, Belgrade
Referee: Dimitar Meckarovski (North Macedonia)

8 July 2009
17:30

Serbia	0–1	Czech Republic
	Report	Tomas Hurab 59'

Železnik Stadium, Belgrade
Referee: Kim Jong-hyeok (South Korea)

== Semifinals ==
8 July 2009
17:30

Great Britain	0–0	Ukraine
	Report
Penalties
	5–6

Omladinski Stadium, Belgrade
Referee: Jiri Jech (Czech Republic)

8 July 2009
17:30

Japan	1–2	Italy
Mitsuhira 18' (pen.)	Report report	Lolaico 40'; Ramaglia 40'

Miloš Obilić Stadium, Belgrade
Referee: Ishalil Ronaissi (Morocco)

== Finals ==
=== Final 15th–16th places ===
10 July 2009
17:30

Mexico	1–2	Ghana
Vazquez 32'	Report	Boateng 61'; Sarpong 73'

Miloš Obilić Stadium, Belgrade
Referee: Jovan Kaludjerovic (Montenegro)

=== Final 13th–14th places ===
10 July 2009
17:30

Morocco	1–1	Republic of Ireland
Ziad 45'	Report	O'Sullvian 24'
Penalties
	4–3

Stadium FK Srem Jakovo, Jakovo
Referee: Novo Panic (Bosnia and Herzegovina)

=== Final 11th–12th places ===
10 July 2009
17:30

Uruguay	3–2	Canada
Campo 1'; Carlevaro 32', 69'	Report	Revivo 6'; Scholefield 60' (pen.)

Fortress Stadium, Smederevo
Referee: Andrea De Marco (Italy)

=== Final 9th–10th places ===
10 July 2009
17:30

Thailand	1–1	Brazil
Thaensopa 3'	Report	Sales 15'
Penalties
	3–4

Stadium FK Lokomotiva, Belgrade
Referee: Silviu Petrescu (Canada)

=== Final 7th–8th places ===
10 July 2009
17:30

France	1–1	Serbia
Mouro 45'	Report	Ubiparip 64' (pen.)
Penalties
	6–5

Stadium Voždovac, Belgrade
Referee: Yurii Moseichuk (Ukraine)

=== Final 5th–6th places ===
10 July 2009
17:30

South Korea	0–2	Czech Republic
	Report	Zmolik 9'; Frnoch 13'

Železnik Stadium, Belgrade
Referee: Alan Black (United Kingdom)

=== Bronze-medal match ===
10 July 2009
17:30

Great Britain	0–1	Japan
	Report	Mishima 31'

Omladinski Stadium, Belgrade
Referee: William Selorm Agbovi (Ghana)

== Gold-medal match ==
10 July 2009
21:00

Ukraine	3–2	Italy
Piskun 2'; Monakhov 43'; Pippa 59' (o.g.)	Report report	Cuomo 20'; Cusaro 84'

Partizan Stadium, Belgrade
Referee: Dragomir Stankovic (Serbia)

== Final standings ==
Place	Team
1st place, gold medalist(s)	Ukraine
2nd place, silver medalist(s)	Italy
3rd place, bronze medalist(s)	Japan
4	Great Britain
5	Czech Republic
6	South Korea
7	France
8	Serbia
9	Brazil
10	Thailand
11	Uruguay
12	Canada
13	Morocco
14	Republic of Ireland
15	Ghana
16	Mexico

== Goalscorers ==
7 goals

- (Japan) Kensuke Nagai

6 goals

- (Brazil) Joao Cesar Sales Jr.

4 goals

- (Republic of Ireland) David O'sullvian
- (Italy) Mario Ramaglia
- (Brazil) Francisco Ribeiro Jr.
- (Canada) James Scholefield
