= Svetlana Karpeeva =

Russian swimmer

Personal information
- Full name: Svetlana Anatolyevna Karpeyeva
- National team: Russia
- Born: 16 October 1985 (age 40) Omsk, Russian SFSR, Soviet Union
- Height: 1.76 m (5 ft 9 in)
- Weight: 68 kg (150 lb)

Sport
- Sport: Swimming
- Strokes: Freestyle, medley
- Club: King Aquatic Club (U.S.)
- Coach: Sean Hutchison (U.S.)
Medal record
Women's swimming
Representing Russia
Summer Universiade
Bronze medal – third place	2007 Bangkok	200 m medley
Bronze medal – third place	2009 Belgrade	400 m medley
Bronze medal – third place	2009 Belgrade	4×100 m medley

Svetlana Anatolyevna Karpeyeva (also Svetlana Karpeeva, Russian: Светлана Анатольевна Карпеева; born October 16, 1985) is a Russian swimmer, who specialized in freestyle and individual medley events. She has been selected to the Russian swimming team in a medley double at the 2008 Summer Olympics, and also claimed three bronze medals in a major international competition, spanning two editions of the Summer Universiade (2007 and 2009).

Karpeeva competed in a medley double, and as a member of the Russian swimming team in the freestyle relay at the 2008 Summer Olympics in Beijing. Leading up to the Games, she fired off a fantastic 2:14.13 to wrest the 200 m individual medley title and slide under the FINA A-cut (2:15.27) at the Santa Clara Invitational meet in California.

On the first night of the Games, Karpeeva swam her first two events with only 30 minutes in between. First, she fought off a sprint freestyle challenge from Mexico's Susana Escobar in heat two of the 400 m individual medley, before fading to sixth place and thirty-first overall in 4:50.22. Half an hour later, Karpeeva and her Russian teammates Daria Belyakina, Yelena Sokolova, and Anastasia Aksenova claimed a distant sixth spot and twelfth overall in the 4 × 100 m freestyle relay with a time of 3:42.52. Diving into the pool at the final exchange, she produced an anchor split of 55.52 seconds.

Three days later, Karpeeva missed the top eight final of the 200 m individual medley with a thirteenth-place time in 2:13.26. One night earlier, she scored a solid 2:12.94 on the rear of the dominant breaststroke leg to grab the last semifinal seed, following her fourth-place finish in heat four.

Karpeeva is also a resident athlete of King Aquatic Club in Federal Way, Washington, where she trained with numerous world-class swimmers including Margaret Hoelzer and Megan Jendrick of the United States, and Heather Brand, a butterfly specialist from Zimbabwe.
