= 2011 NCAA Division I Women's Swimming and Diving Championships =

American college aquatic sports competition

- Host city: Austin, Texas
- Date: March 17–19, 2011
- Venue(s): Lee and Joe Jamail Texas Swimming Center; University of Texas

The 2011 NCAA Women's Division I Swimming and Diving Championships were contested at the 30th annual NCAA-sanctioned swim meet to determine the team and individual national champions of Division I women's collegiate swimming and diving in the United States.

This year's events were hosted by the University of Texas at the Lee and Joe Jamail Texas Swimming Center in Austin, Texas.

California captured this year's team title, finishing 29.5 points ahead of Georgia. It was the Golden Bears' second team title and second title in three seasons.

== Team standings ==
- Note: Top 10 only
- (H) = Hosts
- ^{(DC)} = Defending champions
- Full results

Rank	Team	Points
1st place, gold medalist(s)	California	424
2nd place, silver medalist(s)	Georgia	394 1/2
3rd place, bronze medalist(s)	USC	351
4	Stanford	272
5	Arizona	266
6	Texas (H)	232
7	Florida ^{(DC)}	226
8	Auburn	202
9	Minnesota	192
10	Texas A&M	182

== Swimming results ==
Event	Gold		Silver		Bronze	
50 freestyle	Arianna Vanderpool-Wallace; Auburn	21.38	Liv Jensen; California	21.50	Margo Geer; Arizona	21.93
100 freestyle	Arianna Vanderpool-Wallace; Auburn	47.07	Kate Dwelley; Stanford	47.78	Margo Geer; Arizona	47.95
200 freestyle	Allison Schmitt; Georgia	1:42.08	Lauren Perdue; Virginia	1:42.51	Morgan Scroggy; Georgia	1:42.56
500 freestyle	Allison Schmitt; Georgia	4:34.20	Meredith Budner; Towson	4:34.56	Alyssa Anderson; Arizona	4:35.41
1650 freestyle	Wendy Trott; Georgia	15:40.32	Meredith Budner; Towson	15:44.26	Haley Anderson; USC	15:48.63
100 backstroke	Cindy Tran; California	51.30	Deborah Roth; California	51.51	Presley Bard; USC	51.62
200 backstroke	Maggie Meyer; Wisconsin	1:50.76	Dominique Bouchard; Missouri	1:51.54	Elizabeth Beisel; Florida	1:51.60
100 breaststroke	Jillian Tyler; Minnesota	58.39	Breeja Larson; Texas A&M	58.51	Ashley Danner; George Mason	59.23
200 breaststroke	Haley Spencer; Minnesota	2:06.12	Breeja Larson; Texas A&M	2:06.18	Caitlin Leverenz; California	2:06.23
100 butterfly	Amanda Sims; California	50.49	Claire Donahue; Western Kentucky	51.68	Lyndsay DePaul; USC	51.74
200 butterfly	Katinka Hosszú; USC	1:51.69	Cammile Adams; Texas A&M	1:52.93	Alyssa Anderson; Arizona	1:53.79
200 IM	Katinka Hosszú; USC	1:53.39	Maya DiRado; Stanford	1:54.66	Karlee Bispo; Texas	1:55.07
400 IM	Katinka Hosszú; USC	3:59.75	Elizabeth Beisel; Florida	4:00.87	Maya DiRado; Stanford	4:01.02
200 freestyle relay	California; Hannah Wilson (22.22); Colleen Fotsch (21.87); Erica Dagg (21.95); Liv Jensen (21.32)	1:27.36	Arizona; Margo Geer (22.02); Kaitlyn Flederbach (21.82); Grace Finnegan (22.22); Aubrey Peacock (21.96)	1:28.02	Texas; Kelsey Amundsen (22.32); Bethany Adams (22.04); Ellen Lobb (22.05); Karlee Bispo (21.65)	1:28.06
400 freestyle relay	Georgia; Morgan Scroggy (47.58); Megan Romano (47.03); Melanie Margalis (48.77); Allison Schmitt (47.03)	3:11.03; AR	Auburn; Arianna Vanderpool-Wallace (46.82); Olivia Scott (47.75); Hannah Riordan (48.49); Emily Bos (48.64)	3:11.70	California; Hannah Wilson (48.33); Sara Isaković (48.19); Erica Dagg (48.14); Liv Jensen (47.54)	3:12.51
800 freestyle relay	Georgia; Morgan Scroggy (1:43.25); Megan Romano (1:43.98); Shannon Vreeland (1:45.21); Allison Schmitt (1:42.96)	6:55.40	California; Hannah Wilson (1:44.96); Erica Dagg (1:45.86); Sara Isaković (1:43.22); Liv Jensen (1:44.67)	6:58.71	Arizona; Alyssa Anderson (1:44.05); Margo Geer (1:45.06); Sarah Denninghoff (1:45.89); Monica Drake (1:44.20)	6:59.20
200 medley relay	California; Cindy Tran (24.22); Caitlin Leverenz (26.82); Colleen Fotsch (22.88); Liv Jensen (21.11)	1:35.03; US, AR	Wisconsin; Maggie Meyer (24.44); Ashley Wanland (26.79); Rebecka Palm (23.01); Rebecca Thompson (21.47)	1:35.71	USC; Presley Bard (24.27); Kasey Karlson (26.24); Lyndsay DePaul (23.28); Christel Simms (22.27)	1:36.06
400 medley relay	California; Cindy Tran (51.59); Caitlin Leverenz (59.04); Amanda Sims (50.91); Liv Jensen (46.99)	3:28.53	USC; Presley Bard (51.62); Kasey Karlson (58.84); Lyndsay DePaul (51.13); Katinka Hosszú (48.23)	3:29.82	Arizona; Sarah Denninghoff (51.89); Ellyn Baumgardner (58.48); Dana Christ (52.92); Margo Geer (47.23)	3:30.52

Legend: US – U.S. Open record; AR – American record;

== Diving Results ==
Event	Gold		Silver		Bronze	
1 m diving	Kelci Bryant; Minnesota	349.65	Loren Figueroa; Missouri	335.30	Margaret Hostage; Stanford	327.65
3 m diving	Abby Johnston; Duke	409.35	Kelci Bryant; Minnesota	395.85	Erin Mertz; Purdue	373.90
Platform diving	Kelci Bryant; Minnesota	391.70	Erin Mertz; Purdue	353.50	Bianca Alvarez; Ohio State	349.25

== See also ==
- List of college swimming and diving teams
