= Vanderkaay =

Vanderkaay is a surname. Notable people with the surname include:

- Peter Vanderkaay (born 1984), American swimmer
- Alex Vanderkaay (born 1986), American swimmer
