= Hong Wenwen =

Chinese swimmer (born 1986)

Personal information
- Born: August 22, 1986 (age 39) Wuhan, Hubei, China

Sport
- Sport: Swimming
- Strokes: Butterfly
Medal record
Representing China
Summer Universiade
Silver medal – second place	2009 Belgrade	100m butterfly
Bronze medal – third place	2009 Belgrade	50m butterfly

Hong Wenwen (born August 22, 1986) is a female Chinese swimmer who competed for Team China at the 2008 Summer Olympics.

== Major achievements ==
- 2006 Asian Championships - 1st 4×100 m medley relay, 2nd 100 m fly;
- 2006/2007 National Championships - 2nd 100 m fly, 3rd 50 m/100 m fly;
- 2006 National Winter Championships - 1st 50 m/100 m fly
