= Erica Buratto =

Italian swimmer (born 1984)

Personal information
- Born: 31 December 1984 (age 41) Remanzacco, Italy
- Height: 172 cm (5 ft 8 in)
- Weight: 60 kg (132 lb)

Sport
- Sport: Swimming
- Club: Team Lombardia MGM, Desio
Medal record
Representing Italy
Women's swimming
European Championships (LC)
Gold medal – first place	2012 Debrecen	4×200 m freestyle (Note: She swam only in the preliminaries)
Bronze medal – third place	2012 Debrecen	4×100 m freestyle
European Championships (SC)
Bronze medal – third place	2011 Szczecin	4×50 m freestyle
Mediterranean Games
Gold medal – first place	2009 Pescara	4×100 m freestyle
Universiade
Silver medal – second place	2009 Belgrade	4×100 m medley
Bronze medal – third place	2009 Belgrade	4×200 m freestyle
Women's lifesaving
The World Games
Gold medal – first place	2005 Duisburg	200 m obstacle swim

Erica Buratto (born 31 December 1984) is an Italian swimmer who won three medals in freestyle relays at the 2011 and 2012 European Aquatics Championships.
