= Scot Robison =

American swimmer (born 1988)

Personal information
- Born: December 5, 1988 (age 37)

Sport
- Sport: Swimming
- Event: Freestyle
Medal record
Representing United States
Pan American Games
| Gold medal – first place | 2011 Guadalajara | 4 × 200 m freestyle |
| Silver medal – second place | 2011 Guadalajara | 4 × 100 m freestyle |
| Silver medal – second place | 2011 Guadalajara | 4 × 100 m medley |
Universiade
| Gold medal – first place | 2009 Belgrade | 4 × 100 m freestyle |
| Silver medal – second place | 2009 Belgrade | 200 m freestyle |
| Silver medal – second place | 2009 Belgrade | 4 × 200 m freestyle |
FINA World Championships
| Bronze medal – third place | 2011 Shanghai | 4 × 100 m freestyle |

Scot Robison (born December 5, 1988) is an American former swimmer.

Robinson, a freestyle specialist from Charlotte, North Carolina, was a varsity swimmer for the Virginia Cavaliers. He won relay gold medals at the 2009 Universiade and 2011 Pan American Games, for the 4 × 100 m freestyle and 4 × 200 m freestyle respectively. At the 2011 World Championships in Shanghai, Robison featured in the heats of the 4 × 100 m freestyle team, which secured a bronze medal. In 2012 he was an alternate for the U.S. Olympic squad after placing seventh in the 100 m freestyle at the trials, where he had surprised with the fastest swim in the heats.
