= Chad La Tourette =

American swimmer (born 1988)

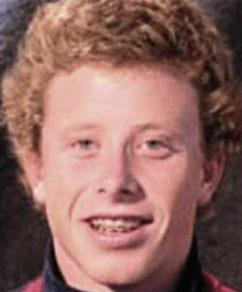

Personal information
- Full name: Chad La Tourette
- Nickname: Frenchie
- Nationality: USA
- Born: October 7, 1988 (age 37) Livermore, California, U.S.
- Height: 6 ft 0 in (183 cm)
- Weight: 175 lb (79 kg)

Sport
- Sport: Swimming
- Strokes: Freestyle
- College team: Stanford University
Medal record
Men's swimming
Representing the United States
Summer Universiade
Gold medal – first place	2007 Bangkok	800 m freestyle
Gold medal – first place	2007 Bangkok	1500 m freestyle
Gold medal – first place	2009 Belgrade	800 m freestyle
Silver medal – second place	2009 Belgrade	400 m freestyle
Silver medal – second place	2009 Belgrade	1500 m freestyle
Silver medal – second place	2009 Belgrade	4×200 m freestyle relay
Pan Pacific Championships
Silver medal – second place	2010 Irvine	800 m freestyle
Silver medal – second place	2010 Irvine	1500 m freestyle

Chad La Tourette (born October 7, 1988) is an American former distance swimmer. La Tourette is a six-time medalist (three golds, three silvers) at the World University Games and two-time silver medalist at the Pan Pacific Swimming Championships.

== Career ==
At the 2010 National Championships, La Tourette competed in the 400 and 1500 m freestyle. In the 400 m freestyle, La Tourette finished in 4th place. In the 1500 m freestyle, La Tourette handily won with a time of 14:55.39 with his closest competitor eight seconds back.

At the 2010 Pan Pacific Swimming Championships, La Tourette won two silver medals behind Canadian swimmer Ryan Cochrane. In the 1500 m freestyle, La Tourette finished with a time of 14:54.48, five seconds behind the eventual winner Cochrane. In the 800 m freestyle, held three days after the 1500 m freestyle, La Tourette finished with a time of 7:51.62. La Tourette said he was not disappointed with his performances but only regretted not staying with Cochrane more.

At the 2011 World Aquatics Championships in Shanghai, La Tourette competed in two events, the 800 and 1500 m freestyle. In his first event, the 800 m freestyle, La Tourette finished in 6th place with a time of 7:46.52. In the 1500 m freestyle, La Tourette finished in 5th place with a time of 14:52.36.

At the 2012 United States Olympic Trials in Omaha, Nebraska, La Tourette just missed making the Olympic team by placing third in the 1500 m freestyle with a time of 14:57.53.

== Achievements ==
Year	Tournament	Venue	Result	Event
2007	2007 Summer Universiade	Bangkok, Thailand	1st	800 m freestyle
2007	2007 Summer Universiade	Bangkok, Thailand	1st	1500 m freestyle
2008	2008 Open Water Worlds	Seville, Spain	4th	5 k open water
2009	2009 Summer Universiade	Belgrade, Serbia	1st	800 m freestyle
2009	2009 Summer Universiade	Belgrade, Serbia	2nd	400 m freestyle
2009	2009 Summer Universiade	Belgrade, Serbia	2nd	1500 m freestyle
2009	2009 Summer Universiade	Belgrade, Serbia	2nd	4×200 m freestyle relay
2010	2010 Pan Pacs	Irvine, California	2nd	1500 m freestyle
2010	2010 Pan Pacs	Irvine, California	2nd	800 m freestyle
2011	2011 World Championships	Shanghai, China	6th	800 m freestyle
2011	2011 World Championships	Shanghai, China	5th	1500 m freestyle

== Personal bests ==
As of July 31, 2011.

Event	Time	Venue	Date
400 m freestyle (long course)	3:46.93	Belgrade	July 5, 2009
800 m freestyle (long course)	7:46.52	Shanghai	July 27, 2011
1500 m freestyle (long course)	14:52.36	Shanghai	July 31, 2011
