= Yumi Kida =

Japanese swimmer

Personal information
- Native name: 貴田裕美
- National team: Japan
- Born: 30 June 1985 (age 41) Akasaka, Tokyo, Japan

Sport
- Sport: Swimming
- Strokes: Freestyle
Medal record
Women's swimming
Representing Japan
Universiade
| Gold medal – first place | 2009 Belgrade | 1500 m freestyle |
| Silver medal – second place | 2009 Belgrade | 800 m freestyle |

Yumi Kida (貴田 裕美, Kida Yumi) (born 30 June 1985 in Akasaka, Tokyo) is a Japanese distance swimmer. At the 2012 Summer Olympics, she competed in the women's marathon 10 kilometre, finishing in 12th place. In 2019, she competed in the women's 10 km event at the 2019 World Aquatics Championships in Gwangju, South Korea. She finished in 22nd place.
