= Uruguay at the 2011 Summer Universiade =

- IOC code: URU

in Shenzhen
- Competitors: 21 in 2 sports
- Medals: Gold 0 Silver 0 Bronze 0 Total 0

Summer Universiade appearances
- 1959; 1961; 1963; 1965; 1967; 1970; 1973; 1975; 1977; 1979; 1981; 1983; 1985; 1987; 1989; 1991; 1993; 1995; 1997; 1999; 2001; 2003; 2005; 2007; 2009; 2011; 2013; 2015; 2017; 2019; 2021; 2025; 2027

Uruguay sent a team of 21 athletes to compete in the 2011 Summer Universiade held in Shenzhen, China from August 12 to August 23, 2011.

== Football ==
Uruguay has qualified a men's team in the football competition.

Each nation must submit a squad of 20 players, with a minimum of two goalkeepers. The following is the Uruguay squad in the men's football tournament of the 2011 Summer Universiade:

Coach: (Uruguay) Ramon Antoría

No.	Pos.	Player	Date of birth (age)	Caps	Club
1	GK	Felipe Fernández	October 4, 1987 (aged 23)		(Uruguay) Malvin 59
12	GK	Ignacio Dominguez	March 2, 1986 (aged 25)		(Uruguay) Trouville
2	DF	Fabian Guerrero	October 4, 1987 (aged 23)		(Uruguay) Playa Honda
3	DF	Matias Finocchietti	October 4, 1987 (aged 23)		(Uruguay) C.L.T.
4	DF	Santiago Pochintesta	October 12, 1988 (aged 22)		(Uruguay) Universidad Católica
6	DF	Gaston Suarez	February 17, 1988 (aged 23)		(Uruguay) Tenis Pinar
13	DF	Joaquin Izquierdo	July 1, 1988 (aged 23)		(Uruguay) Gomensoro
14	DF	Diego Alvarez	March 6, 1987 (aged 24)		(Uruguay) C.A.L.I.
15	DF	Rodrigo Pereira	December 21, 1988 (aged 22)		(Uruguay) Urunday Universitario
5	MF	Joaquin Papa	October 24, 1986 (aged 24)		(Uruguay) Malvin 59
8	MF	Gabriel Bacetti	October 27, 1987 (aged 23)		(Uruguay) Náutico
10	MF	Rodrigo Turnes	May 2, 1987 (aged 24)		(Uruguay) C.L.T.
16	MF	Federico Lambach	November 14, 1987 (aged 23)		(Uruguay) Playa Honda
17	MF	Juan Pablo Sanchez	June 16, 1984 (aged 27)		(Uruguay) Nacional Universitario
20	MF	Gustavo Inciarte	February 16, 1988 (aged 23)		(Uruguay) T.A.P.E.
7	FW	Guzman Vidal	June 25, 1987 (aged 24)		(Uruguay) Old Ivy
9	FW	Ignacio D´Avila	September 2, 1988 (aged 22)		(Uruguay) Tenis Pinar
11	FW	Pablo Carlevaro	November 9, 1986 (aged 24)		(Uruguay) C.A.L.I.
18	FW	Mauro Giammarchi	October 6, 1987 (aged 23)		(Uruguay) C.L.T.
19	FW	Federico Fernández	August 21, 1989 (aged 21)		(Uruguay) Defensor Universitario

Group C

Team	Pld	W	D	L	GF	GA	GD	Pts
Italy	3	2	1	0	5	2	+3	7
Uruguay	3	1	2	0	7	6	+1	5
Thailand	3	0	2	1	2	4	−2	2
Czech Republic	3	0	1	2	2	4	−2	1

2011-08-11
19:30

Czech Republic	2 – 3	Uruguay
Frnoch 55'; Smutny 83'	Report	Inciarte 9', 24'; Vidal 20'

Bao'an Xixiang Sports Center, Shenzhen
Referee: Ng Kai Lam (Hong Kong)

2011-08-14
16:30

Uruguay	2 – 2	Italy
Papa 7'; Salvadori 90+2' (o.g.)	Report	Moxedano 79'; Demma 87'

New Shenzhen Stadium, Shenzhen
Referee: Rainhold Shikongo (Namibia)

2011-08-16
16:30

Uruguay	2 – 2	Thailand
Finocchietti 2'; Lambach 70'	Report	Namwiset 19'; Ramkularbsuk 34'

Gymnasium of Shenzhen Institute of Information Technology, Shenzhen
Referee: Mat Karim Mohd Yussof (Malaysia)

Quarterfinals

2011-08-18
16:30

Russia	0 – 0	Uruguay
	Report
Penalties
Kozhevnikov (penalty scored); Pesegov (penalty scored); Nikitinsky (penalty scored); Drukovskiy (penalty scored); Mamedov (penalty scored)	5 – 4	(penalty scored) Vidal; (penalty scored) Carlevaro; (penalty scored) Turnes; (penalty missed) Álvarez; (penalty scored) Guerrero

New Shenzhen Stadium, Shenzhen
Referee: Zhao Liang (China)

Classification 5th-8th Place

2011-08-20
16:30

China	0 – 0	Uruguay
	Report
Penalties
Li Xun (penalty scored); Zhuang Dayu (penalty scored); Han Guanghui (penalty scored); Yang Yang (penalty scored); Lu Bin (penalty scored); Wang Chao (penalty scored); Wu Fanghu (penalty scored); Fan Zhiqiang (penalty missed)	7 – 8	(penalty scored) Turnes; (penalty scored) Bacetti; (penalty scored) Carlevaro; (penalty scored) Fernandez; (penalty scored) Guerrero; (penalty scored) Suárez; (penalty scored) Papa; (penalty scored) Pochintesta

Gymnasium of Shenzhen Institute of Information Technology, Shenzhen
Referee: Alexey Eskov (Russia)

5th Place Match

2011-08-22
16:30

South Korea	0 – 0	Uruguay
	Report
Penalties
Kim BO (penalty missed); Park HJ (penalty scored); Cho YH (penalty scored); Lee TK (penalty scored)	3 – 0	(penalty missed) Vidal; (penalty missed) Bacetti; (penalty missed) Inciarte

Shenzhen Bao‘an Stadium, Shenzhen
Referee: Robert Adam Madden (Great Britain)

== Swimming ==
Event	Athlete	Heats		Final	
Event	Athlete	Time	Position	Time	Position
50 m Freestyle	Nicolás Francia	25.07	44	did not advance	
100 m Freestyle	Nicolás Francia	54.44	46	did not advance	
50 m Backstroke	Nicolás Francia	27.62	33	did not advance	
100 m Backstroke	Nicolás Francia	1:00.15	36	did not advance	
