= Kristen Heiss =

American swimmer (born 1987)

Kristen Heiss Pritchett
Personal information
- Full name: Kristen Elizabeth Heiss
- Nickname: KHeiss
- Nationality: United States
- Born: May 12, 1987 (age 39) Casper, Wyoming, U.S.
- Height: 1.75 m (5 ft 9 in)

Sport
- Sport: Swimming
- Strokes: Backstroke, Freestyle
- College team: Texas A&M University
Medal record
Representing United States
Summer Universiade
Gold medal – first place	2009 Belgrade	4x200m freestyle relay
Silver medal – second place	2009 Belgrade	400m freestyle
Bronze medal – third place	2009 Belgrade	200m freestyle

Kristen Pritchett formerly Kristen Elizabeth Heiss (born May 12, 1987) is an American backstroke and freestyle swimmer. She is a 14-time collegiate All-American, Big 12 Conference swimmer of the year, 10-time Big 12 Champion, an Olympic Trials finalist, US National Team Member (2008–2010), and won the 200 freestyle at the 2008 U.S. Open.

== Early years ==
Kristen was born May 12, 1987, to Susan and Bill Heiss in Casper, Wyoming. Her father, Bill Heiss, is an All-American high school swimmer from Greeley, Colorado, and an All-American collegiate swimmer and NCAA champion with the Indiana Hoosiers 1970–1974. Kristen has one brother, Erik.

A 2005 graduate of Kelly Walsh High School, Kristen lettered four years for coach Dean Hawks. While there, she was a three-time All-American, four-time All-State, two-time Wyoming 4A Swimmer of the Meet, Academic All-American, and a member of the National Honor Society. She held the state record in the 100 backstroke (broken 2010 by Shaya Schaedler of Gillette, Wyoming), and is a three time state champion in the 200 freestyle. She swam for both the Casper Swim club and the Colorado Springs Swim team.

== Freshman Year 2005–2006 ==
As a freshman, Kristen was a first-team All-American and Big 12 champion in the 800 freestyle relay. She also was a Texas A&M/Verizon Athletic Scholar Award recipient. At the Big 12 championships she finished 3rd in the 200 backstroke with a 1:59.05 and 5th in the 100 backstroke with a 55.41. At the NCAA championships, she was part of the 800 freestyle relay that took 6th place while also taking 26th in the 200 back (1:58.96), 31st in the 100 back (55.35), and 51st in the 500 free (4:55.70).

== Sophomore Year 2006–2007 ==
As a sophomore, Kristen was Big 12 Swimmer of the Year, First Team CSCAA All-American selection, First Team Academic All-Big 12, Texas A&M/Verizon Athletic Scholar Award recipient, and Team Co-MVP. She was Big 12 Champion in both the 500 free (4:44.79) and 200 back (1:55.95) while also swimming the lead off leg for the record holding 800 freestyle relay. She also took third in the 100 back (54.71). At the NCAA championships she placed 5th in the 200 back in an all-time Big 12 record of 1:54.09. She also placed 13th in the 200 free and 14th in the 500 free becoming the first swimmer in Texas A&M history to swim in three individual evening finals at an NCAA Championship.

In the summer before her junior year, Kristen took fifth at summer nationals in the 200 back and qualified to be part of the U.S. National Team that participated at the Japan International Grand Prix in Japan.

== Junior Year 2007–2008 ==
Kristen was part of the Texas A&M's team which placed 4th at the NCAA Championships at Ohio State University. At the 2008 NCAA Championships, Heiss placed 3rd in both the 200 backstroke (1:53.37) and the 500 freestyle (4:40.03). She swam the second leg of the Aggies' NCAA runner-up 800 freestyle relay that swam the 3rd fastest time in NCAA history (6:59.50). Successfully defended her title in the 200 backstroke at the 2008 Big 12 Conference championship.

== Redshirt Season 2008–2009 ==
At the 2008 United States Olympic Trials, she finished 5th place in the 200 meter backstroke in a time of 2:10.18. Throughout the 2008 Trials, Heiss kept a blog about her experiences and the trials, and will serve as an editorial intern for Swimmingworldmagazine.com. Her performance, including her three career-best 200 Backstroke times, and two career-best 200 freestyle times, came less than two weeks after spending 5 days in a Bryan, Texas, hospital undergoing treatment for pulmonary embolisms.

At the 2008 Swimming US Open, Heiss finished second to world record holder Hayley McGregory in the 200 meter backstroke under the meet record set by Olympian Margaret Hoelzer with a time of 2:09.99. With this performance, she secured a spot on the 2009 World University Games in Belgrade, Serbia. The next night, she took silver in the 400 meter freestyle with a time of 4:09.25. On the third night, Heiss took gold in the 200 freestyle, being only the 2nd A&M swimmer to ever do so. She tied with former NCAA Champion Mary Descenza in a lifetime best of 1:59.43.

Heiss Redshirted the 2008–2009 collegiate season while recovering from shoulder surgery.

== Senior Year 2009–2010 ==
Seven months after shoulder surgery, Heiss returned to the pool in July 2009 to compete in the World University Games in Belgrade, Serbia. Kristen represented the United States and was selected as a captain for the US team. In Serbia, Heiss earned silver medals in the 200 backstroke and 400 freestyle, a bronze medal in the 200 freestyle, and anchored the gold medal United States 800 freestyle relay.

At the 2010 Big 12 Conference championship, Heiss won the 200 backstroke for the third time in her career in addition to winning the 500 freestyle. Kristen finished her collegiate eligibility at the 2010 NCAA Championships where she placed 6th in both the 200 backstroke (1:53.67) and 500 freestyle (4:38.97).

== Post-Graduate ==
After finishing her collegiate eligibility in March 2010, Heiss underwent a second shoulder surgery and retired from competitive swimming. Beginning in the Spring of 2010, Heiss became a coach with the Bozeman Barracudas in Bozeman, Montana

She later went on to coach the Casper Area Swim Club in her hometown of Casper, Wyoming. In July 2013, she was hired as an assistant swim coach at the University of Missouri, where she remained until the end of the 2015–2016 season.
