= Boris Steimetz =

French swimmer (born 1987)

Personal information
- National team: France
- Born: 27 July 1987 (age 39) Saint-Denis, Réunion, France

Sport
- Sport: Swimming
- Strokes: Freestyle
Medal record
Men's swimming
Representing France
Olympic Games
Silver medal – second place	2008 Beijing	4×100 m freestyle
World Championships (SC)
Gold medal – first place	2010 Dubai	4×100 m freestyle
Universiade
Silver medal – second place	2009 Belgrade	50 m freestyle
Bronze medal – third place	2009 Belgrade	4×100 m freestyle
Bronze medal – third place	2009 Belgrade	4×100 m medley

Boris Steimetz (born 27 July 1987 at Saint-Denis, Réunion) is a French swimmer. He was part of the silver medal winning team of the 4 × 100 metre freestyle relay at the 2008 Summer Olympics, after he swam in the heats.
