= Giuseppe Lolaico =

Italian footballer

Personal information
- Date of birth: 2 March 1982 (age 44)
- Place of birth: Tricarico, Italy
- Height: 1.82 m (6 ft 0 in)
- Positions: Right back; right winger

Team information
- Current team: Potenza (academy manager)

Senior career*
Years	Team	Apps	(Gls)
2002–2003	Potenza	20	(2)
2003–2004	Pro Vercelli	18	(0)
2004–2006	Pizzighettone	34	(0)
2006–2010	Potenza	87	(2)
2010–2012	Pergolettese	49	(3)
2012–2013	FC Francavilla	10	(0)
2013–2014	Vico Equense	8	(0)
2014–2016	Potenza	32	(1)
2016–2018	Picerno	34	(3)
Total		292	(11)

International career
2009	Italy Universiade	6	(2)
Medal record
Representing Italy
Men's Football
Universiade
Silver medal – second place	2009 Belgrade	Team competition
- * Club domestic league appearances and goals

Giuseppe Lolaico (born 3 March 1982) is an Italian former footballer who is currently as a academy manager for Potenza.

== Biography ==
Born in Tricarico, Basilicata, Lolaico started his career in the region capital, Potenza, at non-professional level. He then played for Pro Vercelli, Pizzighettone before returned to Potenza, now at Serie C2. That season he won the promotion play-offs to 2007–08 Serie C1.

In July 2008 he was signed by Serie B club Rimini but in August returned to Potenza along with Raffaele Nolè. In August 2009, Potenza bought him outright and signed a reported 2-year contract. On 1 February 2010, the last day of winter transfer window, the Potenza captain joined fellow Prima Divisione team Pergocrema. (but from Group A, Potenza was in B) In June Pergocrema won the relegation "play-out" (which he was the starting right-back in the second leg) but Potenza bankrupted.

In 2010–11 Lega Pro Prima Divisione he only made 18 starts but played in both legs of the relegation "play-out" as a left wing-back in 3–5–2/5–3–2 formation. The right wing-back position was occupied by Daniele Ghidotti.

=== International career ===
Lolaico represented Italy Universiade team and finished as the runner-up at 2009 Summer Universiade in July.
