= Uruguay at the 2015 Summer Universiade =

- IOC code: URU

in Gwangju
- Competitors: 39 in 3 sports
- Medals: Gold 0 Silver 0 Bronze 0 Total 0

Summer Universiade appearances
- 1959; 1961; 1963; 1965; 1967; 1970; 1973; 1975; 1977; 1979; 1981; 1983; 1985; 1987; 1989; 1991; 1993; 1995; 1997; 1999; 2001; 2003; 2005; 2007; 2009; 2011; 2013; 2015; 2017; 2019; 2021; 2025; 2027

Uruguay sent a team of 39 athletes to compete in the 2015 Summer Universiade in Gwangju, South Korea from July 3 to July 14, 2015.

== Football ==
Uruguay has qualified a men's team in the football competition.

Each nation must submit a squad of 20 players, with a minimum of two goalkeepers. The following is the Uruguay squad in the men's football tournament of the 2015 Summer Universiade:

Coach: (Uruguay) Daniel Sánchez

No.	Pos.	Player	Date of birth (age)	Caps	Club
1	GK	Juan Pablo Marsicano	May 27, 1991 (aged 24)		(Uruguay) Crandon
12	GK	Erik Álvarez	June 21, 1993 (aged 22)		(Uruguay) C.A.L.I.
2	DF	Fabian Guerrero (Captain)	October 4, 1987 (aged 27)		(Uruguay) Playa Honda
3	DF	Rodrigo Espinosa	September 17, 1991 (aged 23)		(Uruguay) Crandon
4	DF	Gastón Suárez	February 17, 1988 (aged 27)		(Uruguay) Tenis El Pinar
13	DF	Guillermo Garela	October 11, 1990 (aged 24)		(Uruguay) Nacional Universitario
14	DF	Diego Bonaudi	June 2, 1994 (aged 21)		(Uruguay) La Mennais
16	DF	Juan Manera	September 30, 1991 (aged 23)		(Uruguay) Playa Honda
18	DF	Diego Sánchez	July 23, 1991 (aged 23)		(Uruguay) Elbio Fernández
5	MF	Federico Púa	February 8, 1988 (aged 27)		(Uruguay) Playa Honda
6	MF	Nicolás Da Costa	January 26, 1988 (aged 27)		(Uruguay) Defensor Sporting Universitario
7	MF	Guzmán Telesca	March 10, 1990 (aged 25)		(Uruguay) Defensor Sporting Universitario
8	MF	Ignacio Christophersen	April 6, 1989 (aged 26)		(Uruguay) La Mennais
10	MF	Rodrigo Turnes	May 2, 1987 (aged 28)		(Uruguay) Carrasco Lawn Tennis
15	MF	Martín Courtoisie	March 15, 1994 (aged 21)		(Uruguay) Nacional Universitario
9	FW	Martín Oyenard	July 5, 1992 (aged 22)		(Uruguay) Tenis El Pinar
11	FW	Martín Monroy	February 20, 1989 (aged 26)		(Uruguay) Elbio Fernández
17	FW	Javier Tais	November 24, 1990 (aged 24)		(Uruguay) San Juan Bautista
19	FW	Ignacio D´Avila	September 2, 1988 (aged 26)		(Uruguay) Tenis El Pinar
20	FW	Pablo Sasiaín	April 4, 1990 (aged 25)		(Uruguay) Independiente Universitario

== Swimming ==
Event	Athlete	Heats		Final	
Event	Athlete	Time	Position	Time	Position
Enzo Martínez	Men's 50 m Freestyle				
Enzo Martínez	Men's 100 m Freestyle				
Carolina Di Lorenzi	Women's 50m Breaststroke				
Carolina Di Lorenzi	Women's 100m Breaststroke				
Carolina Di Lorenzi	Women's 200m Breaststroke				
Carolina Cazot	Women's 50m Butterfly				
Carolina Cazot	Women's 50m Freestyle				
Carolina Cazot	Women's 100m Freestyle				
Carolina Cazot	Women's 200m Freestyle				
