= Uruguay at the 2013 Summer Universiade =

- IOC code: URU

in Kazan
- Competitors: 21 in 2 sports
- Medals: Gold 0 Silver 0 Bronze 0 Total 0

Summer Universiade appearances
- 1959; 1961; 1963; 1965; 1967; 1970; 1973; 1975; 1977; 1979; 1981; 1983; 1985; 1987; 1989; 1991; 1993; 1995; 1997; 1999; 2001; 2003; 2005; 2007; 2009; 2011; 2013; 2015; 2017; 2019; 2021; 2025; 2027

Uruguay sent a team of 20 athletes to compete in the 2013 Summer Universiade held in Kazan, Russia from July 6 to July 17, 2013.

== Football ==
Uruguay has qualified a men's team in the football competition.

Each nation must submit a squad of 20 players, with a minimum of two goalkeepers. The following is the Uruguay squad in the men's football tournament of the 2013 Summer Universiade:

Coach: (Uruguay) Gustavo Israel

No.	Pos.	Player	Date of birth (age)	Caps	Club
1	GK	Felipe Fernández	October 4, 1987 (aged 25)		(Uruguay) Malvin 59
12	GK	Juan Pablo Marsicano	May 27, 1991 (aged 22)		(Uruguay) Crandon
2	DF	Fabian Guerrero	October 4, 1987 (aged 25)		(Uruguay) Playa Honda
3	DF	Matias Finocchietti	October 4, 1987 (aged 25)		(Uruguay) C.L.T.
4	DF	Gaston Suarez	February 17, 1988 (aged 25)		(Uruguay) Tenis El Pinar
6	DF	Fabián Aicardi	July 1, 1988 (aged 25)		(Uruguay) Limburgo
13	DF	Diego Alvarez	March 6, 1987 (aged 26)		(Uruguay) C.A.L.I.
14	DF	Danilo Fregossi	August 20, 1988 (aged 24)		(Uruguay) Salesianos de Las Piedras
5	MF	Federico Lambach	November 14, 1987 (aged 25)		(Uruguay) Playa Honda
7	MF	Martín Oyenard	July 5, 1992 (aged 21)		(Uruguay) Tenis El Pinar
8	MF	Federico Púa	February 8, 1988 (aged 25)		(Uruguay) Rampla
10	MF	Leandro Fernández	February 13, 1989 (aged 24)		(Uruguay) Nacional Universitario
15	MF	Joaquin Papa	October 24, 1986 (aged 26)		(Uruguay) Malvin 59
16	MF	Gustavo Inciarte	February 16, 1988 (aged 25)		(Uruguay) T.A.P.E.
18	MF	Mario Mendlowicz	September 9, 1988 (aged 24)		(Uruguay) Hebraica Macabi
9	FW	Nicolás Pirotto	February 21, 1985 (aged 28)		(Uruguay) Playa Honda
11	FW	Pablo Carlevaro	November 2, 1986 (aged 26)		(Uruguay) C.A.L.I.
17	FW	Ignacio Fernández	July 28, 1989 (aged 23)		(Uruguay) Jesús María
19	FW	Ignacio D´Avila	September 2, 1988 (aged 24)		(Uruguay) Tenis El Pinar
20	FW	Guzman Vidal	June 25, 1987 (aged 26)		(Uruguay) Old Ivy

== Swimming ==
Event	Athlete	Heats		Final	
Event	Athlete	Time	Position	Time	Position
50 m Freestyle	Enzo Martínez	23.68	5 (Heat)	did not advance	
100 m Freestyle	Enzo Martínez	51.93	5 (Heat)	did not advance	
