= Uruguay at the 2021 Summer World University Games =

- Flag of Uruguay
- IOC code: URU

in Chengdu, China 28 July 2023 – 8 August 2023
- Competitors: 2 (1 man and 1 woman)
- Medals: Gold 0 Silver 0 Bronze 0 Total 0

Summer World University Games appearances
- 1959; 1961; 1963; 1965; 1967; 1970; 1973; 1975; 1977; 1979; 1981; 1983; 1985; 1987; 1989; 1991; 1993; 1995; 1997; 1999; 2001; 2003; 2005; 2007; 2009; 2011; 2013; 2015; 2017; 2019; 2021; 2025; 2027

Uruguay competed at the 2021 Summer World University Games in Chengdu, China held from 28 July to 8 August 2023.

== Competitors ==
Sport	Men	Women	Total
Swimming	1	1	2

== Swimming ==
Men

Athlete	Event	Heat		Semi-finals		Final	
Athlete	Event	Time	Rank	Time	Rank	Time	Rank
Bautista González	50 metre breaststroke	29.93	39	Did not advance			
Bautista González	100 metre breaststroke	1:05.97	36	Did not advance			
Bautista González	200 metre breaststroke	2:27.11	28	Did not advance			

Women

Athlete	Event	Heat		Semi-finals		Final	
Athlete	Event	Time	Rank	Time	Rank	Time	Rank
Taissa Pedreira Vico	50 metre freestyle	27.52	29	Did not advance			
Taissa Pedreira Vico	100 metre freestyle	59.73	35	Did not advance			
Taissa Pedreira Vico	200 metre freestyle	2:11.86	27	Did not advance			
Taissa Pedreira Vico	400 metre freestyle	4:45.24	23	—N/a		Did not advance	
