= Swimming at the 2009 Summer Universiade =

Swimming at the XXV Summer Universiade
- Venues: Tašmajdan Sports Centre
- Dates: 5 July 2009 – 11 July 2009

The Swimming competition of the 25th Summer Universiade was held at the Tašmajdan Sports Centre in Belgrade, Serbia, 5–11 July 2009. All events were contested in a long course (50m) pool.

Of note, this was held just 2 weeks prior to the 2009 World Championships.

== Participating nations ==
Teams from 62 countries participated in Swimming at the 2009 World University Games. They were from:

- Argentina
- Australia
- Austria
- Belarus
- Brazil
- Canada
- Chile
- China
- Chinese Taipei
- Colombia
- Croatia
- Czech Republic
- Ecuador
- Estonia
- Finland
- France
- Germany
- Great Britain
- Greece
- Hong Kong
- Hungary
- Ireland
- Israel
- Italy
- Japan
- Jordan
- Kazakhstan
- Kenya
- Lebanon
- Lithuania
- Macedonia
- Macau
- Mexico
- Montenegro
- Morocco
- Netherlands Antilles
- New Zealand
- Nigeria
- Norway
- Oman
- Peru
- Poland
- Portugal
- Qatar
- Russia
- Saudi Arabia
- Senegal
- Serbia
- Slovakia
- Slovenia
- South Africa
- South Korea
- Spain
- Sri Lanka
- Sweden
- Switzerland
- Tanzania
- Thailand
- Ukraine
- Uganda
- United States
- Uruguay

== Results ==
=== Men's events ===
Event	Gold		Silver		Bronze	
50m Freestyle	Andrea Rolla; Italy	22.16	Boris Steimetz; France; Sergey Fesikov; Russia	22.19	not awarded	
100m Freestyle	Sergey Fesikov; Russia	48.43	Cameron Prosser; Australia	48.57	Jason Dunford; Kenya	48.73; NR
200m Freestyle	Sho Uchida (Japan)	1:47.63	Doug Robison; USA	1:48.34	Shogo Hihara (Japan)	1:48.49
400m Freestyle	Przemysław Stańczyk; Poland	3:46.72 GR	Chad La Tourette; USA	3:46.93	Federico Colbertaldo; Italy	3:47.17
800m Freestyle	Chad La Tourette; USA	7:47.24 GR	Federico Colbertaldo; Italy	7:48.58	Przemysław Stańczyk; Poland	7:53.67
1500m Freestyle	Przemysław Stańczyk; Poland	14:51.06 GR	Chad La Tourette; USA	14:53.77	Federico Colbertaldo; Italy	15:03.90
50m Backstroke	Junya Koga (Japan)	24.63 GR	Ryosuke Irie (Japan)	25.05	Guy Barnea; Israel	25.09
100m Backstroke	Ryosuke Irie (Japan)	52.60 GR	Helge Meeuw (Germany)	52.94	Junya Koga (Japan)	53.50
200m Backstroke	Ryosuke Irie (Japan)	1:54.13 GR	Patrick Schirk; USA	1:57.05	Kazuki Watanabe (Japan)	1:58.23
50m Breaststroke	Kevin Swander; USA	27.14 GR	Felipe França Silva; Brazil	27.23	Čaba Silađi; Serbia	27.27; NR
100m Breaststroke	Igor Borysik; Ukraine	59.53 GR	Fabio Scozzoli; Italy	59.85	Hiromasa Sakimoto (Japan)	59.90
200m Breaststroke	Igor Borysik; Ukraine	2:08.73 GR	Naoya Tomita (Japan)	2:11.02	Giedrius Titenis; Lithuania	2:11.14
50m Butterfly	Jernej Godec; Slovenia	23.41	Jason Dunford; Kenya	23.45	Chris Brady; USA	23.56
100m Butterfly	Jason Dunford; Kenya	51.29	Chris Brady; USA	51.62	Maxim Ganikhin; Russia; Michal Rubáček; Czech Republic	52.33
200m Butterfly	Paweł Korzeniowski; Poland	1:54.30 GR	Kazuya Kaneda (Japan)	1:56.43	Ryusuke Sakata (Japan); Maxim Ganikhin; Russia	1:56.75
200m Individual Medley	Alex Vanderkaay; USA	1:57.58 GR	Keith Beavers; Canada	1:59.83	Yuma Kosaka (Japan)	2:00.77
400m Individual Medley	Mateusz Matczak; Poland	4:12.28 GR	Alex Vanderkaay; USA	4:12.48	Yuya Horihata (Japan)	4:15.26
4 × 100 m Free Relay	USA; Will Copeland (48.39); Chris Brady (48.22); Eric McGinnis (49.71); Doug Robison (48.42)	3:14.74 GR	Italy; Michele Santucci (49.95); Nicola Cassio (48.90); Vittorio Dinia (48.71); Andrea Rolla (48.51); Lorenzo Benatti	3:16.07	France; Antoine Galavtine (50.22); Sebastien Bodet (48.44); Kevin Trannoy (48.96); Boris Steimetz (48.95); Joris Hustache	3:16.57
4 × 200 m Free Relay	(Japan); Sho Uchida (1:47.81); Shogo Hihara (1:46.72); Yasunori Mononobe (1:48.89); Shunsuke Kuzuhara (1:48.12)	7:11.54 GR	USA; Doug Robison (1:48.18); Bobby Bollier (1:49.65); Matt Patton (1:47.58); Alex Vanderkaay (1:48.79); Chad La Tourette	7:14.20	Canada; Ray Betuzzi (1:48.37); Brian Johns (1:46.33); Keith Beavers (1:50.65); Matthew Swanston (1:51.10); Rory Biskupski	7:16.45
4 × 100 m Medley Relay	(Japan); Ryosuke Irie (52.75); Hiromasa Sakimoto (59.63); Shimpei Irie (52.05); Rammaru Harada (48.37)	3:32.80 GR	Italy; Enrico Catalano (55.08); Fabio Scozzoli (59.68); Rudy Goldin (52.28); Vittorio Dinia (48.71); Nicola Cassio; Matteo Giordano; Stefano Iacobone; Marco Sommaripa	3:35.75	France; Eric Ress (55.57); Tony de Pellegrini (1:01.37); Cyril Marchant (53.41); Boris Steimetz (47.96)	3:38.31

WR – World Record; GR – Games Record

=== Women's events ===
Event	Gold		Silver		Bronze	
50m Freestyle	Aleksandra Gerasimenya; Belarus	24.62 GR	Dorothea Brandt (Germany)	25.03	Michelle King; USA	25.10
100m Freestyle	Hannah Wilson; Hong Kong	54.35 GR	Aleksandra Gerasimenya; Belarus	54.79	Miroslava Najdanovski; Serbia; Madison Kennedy; USA	54.96
200m Freestyle	Sara Isaković; Slovenia	1:58.59	Kevyn Peterson; Canada	1:58.67	Kristen Heiss; USA	1:58.77
400m Freestyle	Kevyn Peterson; Canada	4:10.01	Kristen Heiss; USA	4:11.30	Leone Vorster; South Africa	4:13.18
800m Freestyle	Whitney Sprague; USA	8:32.71	Yumi Kida (Japan)	8:34.98	Roberta Ioppi; Italy	8:40.00
1500m Freestyle	Yumi Kida (Japan)	16:24.26	Whitney Sprague; USA	16:29.04	Natsumi Iwashita (Japan)	16:31.68
50m Backstroke	Shiho Sakai (Japan)	28.17 GR	Xu Tianlongzi (China)	28.20	Aleksandra Gerasimenya; Belarus	28.32
100m Backstroke	Shiho Sakai (Japan)	1:00.30	Katy Murdoch; Canada	1:00.92	Eri Tabei (Japan)	1:01.01
200m Backstroke	Stephanie Proud (United Kingdom) Great Britain	2:08.91 GR	Kristen Heiss; USA	2:09.22	Tomoyo Fukuda (Japan)	2:11.17
50m Breaststroke	Daria Deeva; Russia	31.55	Kim Dal-Eun; South Korea	31.57	Ewa Scieszko; Poland	31.63
100m Breaststroke	Chiara Boggiatto; Italy	1:07.15 GR	Nađa Higl; Serbia	1:07.80; NR	Hitomi Nose (Japan)	1:07.87
200m Breaststroke	Rie Kaneto (Japan)	2:22.32 GR	Nađa Higl; Serbia	2:24.20	Alena Alekseeva; Russia	2:25.40
50m Butterfly	Sviatlana Khakhlova; Belarus	25.97 GR	Cristina Maccagnola; Italy	26.52	Hong Wenwen (China)	26.66
100m Butterfly	Hannah Wilson; Hong Kong	58.24 GR	Hong Wenwen (China)	59.19	Ayano Kuroki (Japan)	59.44
200m Butterfly	Annika Mehlhorn (Germany)	2:07.35	Lyndsay DePaul; USA	2:09.89	Haruka Minamizono (Japan)	2:10.01
200m Individual Medley	Ava Ohlgren; USA	2:12.07 GR	Asami Kitagawa (Japan)	2:13.39	Tomoyo Fukuda (Japan)	2:13.71
400m Individual Medley	Ava Ohlgren; USA	4:40.61	Lyndsay DePaul; USA	4:41.94	Svetlana Karpeeva; Russia	4:44.26
4 × 100 m Freestyle relay	USA; Michelle King (56.42); Madison Kennedy (54.94); Ava Ohlgren (55.77); Morgan Scroggy (54.68); Chelsea Nauta	3:41.81	(Japan); Yayoi Matsumoto (56.18); Misaki Yamaguchi (55.08); Asami Kitagawa (55.67); Shiho Sakai (55.67)	3:42.60	Canada; Marie-Pier Ratelle (55.64); Breanna Hendriks (55.97); Katy Murdoch (55.58); Seanna Mitchell (55.90); Hayley Nell	3:43.09
4 × 200 m Freestyle Relay	USA; Ava Ohlgren (2:01.92); Morgan Scroggy (1:59.06); Chelsea Nauta (2:00.07); Kristen Heiss (1:59.44)	8:00.49	Canada; Kevyn Peterson (1:59.08); Breanna Hendriks (1:59.01); Seanna Mitchell (2:02.88); Katy Murdoch (2:01.80)	8:03.67	Italy; Silvia Florio (2:02.01); Erica Buratto (1:59.43); Roberta Ioppi (2:01.57); Ambra Migliori (2:03.13)	8:06.14
4 × 100 m Medley Relay	USA; Lauren Rogers (1:02.24); Katlin Freeman (1:05.8); Amanda Sims (59.22); Madison Kennedy (54.61); Morgan Scroggy; Ava Ohlgren	4:01.90 GR	Italy; Elena Gemo (1:01.70); Chiara Boggiatto (1:07.62); Cristina Maccagnola (58.30); Erica Buratto (55.13); Maria Laura Simonetto	4:02.75	Russia; Ksenia Moskvina (1:01.31); Daria Deeva (1:07.60); Svetlana Fedulova (59.56); Svetlana Karpeeva (55.42)	4:03.89

WR – World Record; GR – Games Record

=== Medal table ===
Rank	Nation	Gold	Silver	Bronze	Total
1	United States	10	12	4	26
2	Japan	10	6	14	30
3	Poland	4	0	2	6
4	Italy	2	6	4	12
5	Russia	2	1	5	8
6	Belarus	2	1	1	4
7	Hong Kong	2	0	0	2
7	Slovenia	2	0	0	2
7	Ukraine	2	0	0	2
10	Canada	1	4	2	7
11	Germany	1	2	0	3
12	Kenya	1	1	1	3
13	Great Britain	1	0	0	1
14	Serbia	0	2	2	4
15	China	0	2	1	3
16	France	0	1	2	3
17	Australia	0	1	0	1
17	Brazil	0	1	0	1
17	South Korea	0	1	0	1
20	Czech Republic	0	0	1	1
20	Israel	0	0	1	1
20	Lithuania	0	0	1	1
20	South Africa	0	0	1	1
Totals (23 entries)		40	41	42	123

== See also ==
- 2009 in swimming
