= Uruguay at the 2009 Summer Universiade =

- IOC code: URU

in Belgrade
- Competitors: 22 in 2 sports
- Medals: Gold 0 Silver 0 Bronze 0 Total 0

Summer Universiade appearances
- 1959; 1961; 1963; 1965; 1967; 1970; 1973; 1975; 1977; 1979; 1981; 1983; 1985; 1987; 1989; 1991; 1993; 1995; 1997; 1999; 2001; 2003; 2005; 2007; 2009; 2011; 2013; 2015; 2017; 2019; 2021; 2025; 2027

Uruguay sent a team of 22 athletes to compete in the 2009 Summer Universiade held in Belgrade, Serbia from July 1 to July 12, 2009.

== Football ==
Uruguay has qualified a men's team in the football competition.

Each nation must submit a squad of 20 players, with a minimum of two goalkeepers.

Group C

Team	Pld	W	D	L	GF	GA	GD	Pts
South Korea	3	2	1	0	4	1	3	7
Italy	3	2	0	1	4	4	0	6
Uruguay	3	1	1	1	3	3	0	4
Republic of Ireland	3	0	0	3	1	4	-3	0

2009-06-30
17:30

Uruguay	1 – 0	Republic of Ireland
Turnes 30'	Report

Stadion FK Indjija, Inđija
Referee: Ishalil Ronaissi (MAR)

2009-07-02
10:30

South Korea	1 – 1	Uruguay
Kim B-k 45+'	Report	D'avila 38'

Stadium Voždovac, Belgrade
Referee: Francisco Chacon (MEX)

2009-07-04
10:30

Italy	2 – 1	Uruguay
Ramaglia 54' 90+1'	Report report	D'avila 30'

Stadium FK Srem Beograd, Belgrade
Referee: Dragomir Stankovic (SRB)

Classification 9-16 places

2009-07-06
10:30

Morocco	0 – 2	Uruguay
	Report	Suarez 17'; Carzolio 22'

Miloš Obilić Stadium, Belgrade
Referee: Jovan Kaludjerovic (MNE)

Classification 9-12 places

2009-07-08
10:30

Thailand	3 – 0	Uruguay
Papunga 8'; Thaensopa 87'; Pannasi 90+3'	Report

Stadium FK Srem Jakovo, Jakovo
Referee: Ryuji Sato (JPN)

Final 11-12 places

2009-07-10
17:30

Uruguay	3 – 2	Canada
Campo 1'; Carlevaro 32' 69'	Report	Revivo 6'; Scholefield 60' (pen.)

Fortress Stadium, Smederevo
Referee: Andrea De Marco (ITA)

== Swimming ==
Athlete	Events	Heat		Semifinal		Final	
Athlete	Events	Time	Rank	Time	Rank	Time	Rank
Nicolás Francia	Men's 50 m freestyle	24.58	46	Did not advance			
Nicolás Francia	Men's 100 m freestyle	54.18	54	Did not advance			
Nicolás Francia	Men's 50 m backstroke	27.93	44	Did not advance			
Nicolás Francia	Men's 100 m backstroke	59.06	38	Did not advance			
Martín Melconian	Men's 50 m breaststroke	28.59	20	Did not advance			
Martín Melconian	Men's 100 m breaststroke	1:05.06	40	Did not advance			
