= Sonja Schöber =

German swimmer

Personal information
- Nationality: Germany
- Born: 9 July 1985 (age 41) Hörde, Nordrhein-Westfalen, West Germany
- Height: 1.77 m (5 ft 9 1/2 in)
- Weight: 64 kg (141 lb)

Sport
- Sport: Swimming
- Strokes: Breaststroke, medley
- Club: SG Dortmund
- Coach: Volker Höltke
Medal record
Women's swimming
Representing Germany
Universiade
Bronze medal – third place	2007 Bangkok	4×100 m freestyle

Sonja Schöber (born July 9, 1985 in Hörde, Nordrhein-Westfalen) is a German swimmer, who specialized in breaststroke and individual medley events. Schober won a bronze medal, as a member of the German swimming team, at the 2007 Summer Universiade in Bangkok, Thailand with a final time of 3:42.68. Schober is a member of the Dortmund Sport Community Club (German: Startgemeinschaft Dortmund) in Dortmund, and is coached and trained by Volker Höltke. In 2009 Schöber received a two-year suspension, after she tested positive for doping, and for irregular levels of testosterone.

== Biography ==
Schober qualified for two swimming events at the 2008 Summer Olympics in Beijing, by clearing FINA A-standard entry times of 1:08.17 (100 m breaststroke) and 2:14.48 (200 m individual medley) from the German Olympic trials in Berlin. On the second night of the Games, Schober challenged seven other swimmers in a top seeded heat of the 100 m breaststroke, including world record holder Leisel Jones of Australia, and former Olympic champion Megan Jendrick of the United States. Schober finished dead-last in her heat and thirty-sixth overall with a time of 1:11.36, more than five seconds behind Jones, who broke an Olympic record. In the 200 m individual medley, Schober repeated her luck on the same heat, as she finished in last place again by six seconds behind Canada's Erica Morningstar in 2:20.18. Schober failed to advance into the semifinals, as she placed thirty-fourth overall in the preliminary heats. Her Olympic time in the medley was 2.28 seconds behind her fellow swimmer Katharina Schiller.

== Doping ==
On November 19, 2009, Schöber was unable to compete at the Berlin meet of the FINA World Cup Circuit, and thereby missed out the German national championships. She was placed under investigation on a positive test for abnormal levels of testosterone. According to her representatives, she had medically documented these abnormal levels in her adolescent stage, and her positive test might be the cause of recent weight loss. She also claimed that there might have been a case of contaminated medical supplements. Few months later, Schöber received a two-year suspension by the Court of Arbitration for Sport and an arbitration panel in Kessel, after she was tested positive for the suspected use of doping, and for irregular levels of testosterone.
