= Morgan Scroggy =

American swimmer

Personal information
- National team: United States
- Born: August 2, 1988 (age 37) Portland, Oregon, U.S.
- Height: 5 ft 11 in (180 cm)

Sport
- Sport: Swimming
- Strokes: Freestyle
- Club: Athens Bulldog Swim Club
- College team: University of Georgia
Medal record
Women's swimming
Representing the United States
Pan Pacific Championships
Gold medal – first place	2010 Irvine	4x200 m freestyle
Silver medal – second place	2010 Irvine	200 m freestyle
Summer Universiade
Gold medal – first place	2009 Belgrade	4x100 m freestyle
Gold medal – first place	2009 Belgrade	4x200 m freestyle
Gold medal – first place	2009 Belgrade	4x100 m medley

Morgan Scroggy (born August 2, 1988) is an American competition swimmer.

== Career ==
At the 2010 U.S. National Championships, the selection meet for both the 2010 Pan Pacific Swimming Championships and the 2011 World Aquatics Championships, Scroggy placed third in both the 200 m individual medley and 200 m backstroke, and fourth in the 200 m freestyle, earning a place on the US National Team roster. At the 2010 Pan Pacific Championships, she earned the silver medal in the 200 m freestyle despite having placed just fourth in the event at Nationals. Scroggy also swam the second leg of the 4 × 200 m freestyle relay, in which the US won the gold medal in a new championship record time of 7:51.21.

Scroggy was an engineering student at the University of Georgia, and trained under UGA coach Jack Bauerle.

== Personal bests ==
Long course meters
Stroke	Distance	Time	Date
Freestyle	100 m	54.96	Aug 2010
Freestyle	200 m	1:57.13	Aug 2010
Medley	200 m	2:11.25	Aug 2010
Backstroke	200 m	2:10.87	Aug 2010
