= Swimming at the 2008 Summer Olympics – Women's 200 metre individual medley =

Women's 200 metre individual medley at the Games of the XXIX Olympiad
- Venue: Beijing National Aquatics Center
- Date: August 11, 2008 (heats); August 12, 2008 (semifinals); August 13, 2008 (final)
- Competitors: 39 from 30 nations
- Winning time: 2:08.45 WR

Medalists
1st place, gold medalist(s)		Stephanie Rice	Australia
2nd place, silver medalist(s)		Kirsty Coventry	Zimbabwe
3rd place, bronze medalist(s)		Natalie Coughlin	United States

The women's 200 metre individual medley event at the 2008 Olympic Games took place on 11–13 August at the Beijing National Aquatics Center in Beijing, China.

Australia's Stephanie Rice became the third swimmer in Olympic history to strike a medley double, since Michelle Smith did so in 1996 and Yana Klochkova in 2000 and 2004. She established a sterling time of 2:08.45 to lower her world record from the Olympic trials by almost half a second (0.50). Zimbabwe's Kirsty Coventry added a third silver to her collection, finishing with an African record of 2:08.59. U.S. swimmer Natalie Coughlin, who held the lead on the backstroke leg, picked up a bronze medal in 2:10.34.

Completing the second half of a difficult double, American Katie Hoff produced the same result from the 200 m freestyle, as she finished again in fourth place with a time of 2:10.68. Australia's Alicia Coutts placed fifth in 2:11.43, while Japan's Asami Kitagawa swam the outside lane to finish the race in sixth place at 2:11.56. On the strength of the breaststroke leg, Kitagawa won a swimoff for the last slot in the top 8 final over Hungary's Evelyn Verrasztó. Canada's Julia Wilkinson (2:12.43) and Poland's Katarzyna Baranowska (2:13.36) closed out the field.

Earlier in the semifinals, Coventry established an Olympic standard of 2:09.53 to cut off Yana Klochkova's eight-year record by a 1.15-second deficit.

== Records ==
Prior to this competition, the existing world and Olympic records were as follows.

World record	Stephanie Rice (AUS)	2:08.92	Sydney, Australia	25 March 2008	
Olympic record	Yana Klochkova (UKR)	2:10.68	Sydney, Australia	19 September 2000	-

The following new world and Olympic records were set during this competition.

Date	Event	Name	Nationality	Time	Record
August 12	Semifinal 1	Kirsty Coventry	Zimbabwe	2:09.53	OR
August 13	Final	Stephanie Rice	Australia	2:08.45	WR

== Results ==
=== Heats ===
Rank	Heat	Lane	Name	Nationality	Time	Notes
1	4	3	Alicia Coutts	Australia	2:11.55	Q
2	4	4	Katie Hoff	United States	2:11.58	Q
3	3	4	Natalie Coughlin	United States	2:11.63	Q
4	5	3	Hannah Miley	Great Britain	2:11.72	Q
5	3	6	Julie Hjorth-Hansen	Denmark	2:11.99	Q
6	5	4	Stephanie Rice	Australia	2:12.07	Q
7	4	5	Camille Muffat	France	2:12.16	Q
8	5	5	Kirsty Coventry	Zimbabwe	2:12.18	Q
9	3	2	Asami Kitagawa	Japan	2:12.47	Q, NR
9	5	6	Katarzyna Baranowska	Poland	2:12.47	Q
11	5	2	Evelyn Verrasztó	Hungary	2:12.52	Q
12	3	1	Li Jiaxing	China	2:12.53	Q
13	3	7	Julia Wilkinson	Canada	2:12.56	Q
14	3	5	Mireia Belmonte García	Spain	2:12.75	Q
15	3	3	Keri-Anne Payne	Great Britain	2:12.78	Q
16	4	1	Svetlana Karpeeva	Russia	2:12.94	Q
17	4	8	Katinka Hosszú	Hungary	2:13.05	
18	5	1	Helen Norfolk	New Zealand	2:13.50	
19	5	7	Erica Morningstar	Canada	2:14.11	
20	4	6	Qi Hui	China	2:14.25	
21	4	2	Cylia Vabre	France	2:14.34	
22	2	7	Joanna Maranhão	Brazil	2:14.97	
23	2	1	Sara Nordenstam	Norway	2:15.13	NR
24	2	2	Choi Hye-Ra	South Korea	2:15.26	
25	2	3	Anja Klinar	Slovenia	2:15.39	
26	2	5	Jessica Pengelly	South Africa	2:15.80	
27	3	8	María Peláez	Spain	2:15.97	
28	2	6	Femke Heemskerk	Netherlands	2:16.28	
29	2	8	Siow Yi Ting	Malaysia	2:17.11	
30	4	7	Katharina Schiller	Germany	2:18.00	
31	1	6	Ganna Dzerkal	Ukraine	2:18.25	
32	1	2	Erika Stewart	Colombia	2:18.54	NR
33	1	3	Sherry Tsai	Hong Kong	2:18.91	
34	5	8	Sonja Schöber	Germany	2:20.18	
35	1	4	Erla Dögg Haraldsdóttir	Iceland	2:20.53	
36	1	7	Lin Man-Hsu	Chinese Taipei	2:23.29	
37	2	4	Georgina Bardach	Argentina	2:25.74	
38	1	1	Fibriani Ratna Marita	Indonesia	2:28.18	
	1	5	Maroua Mathlouthi	Tunisia	DNS	

=== Semifinals ===
==== Semifinal 1 ====
Rank	Lane	Name	Nationality	Time	Notes
1	6	Kirsty Coventry	Zimbabwe	2:09.53	Q, OR, AF
2	3	Stephanie Rice	Australia	2:10.58	Q
3	4	Katie Hoff	United States	2:10.90	Q
4	2	Katarzyna Baranowska	Poland	2:12.13	Q, NR
5	5	Hannah Miley	Great Britain	2:12.35	
6	8	Svetlana Karpeeva	Russia	2:13.26	
7	1	Mireia Belmonte García	Spain	2:13.45	
8	7	Li Jiaxing	China	2:13.47	

==== Semifinal 2 ====
Rank	Lane	Name	Nationality	Time	Notes
1	5	Natalie Coughlin	United States	2:11.84	Q
2	1	Julia Wilkinson	Canada	2:12.03	Q
2	4	Alicia Coutts	Australia	2:12.03	Q
4	2	Asami Kitagawa	Japan	2:12.18	QSO, NR
4	7	Evelyn Verrasztó	Hungary	2:12.18	QSO
6	3	Julie Hjorth-Hansen	Denmark	2:12.26	
7	6	Camille Muffat	France	2:12.36	
8	8	Keri-Anne Payne	Great Britain	2:14.14	

==== Swimoff ====
Rank	Lane	Name	Nationality	Time	Notes
1	5	Asami Kitagawa	Japan	2:12.02	Q, NR
2	4	Evelyn Verrasztó	Hungary	2:14.96	

=== Final ===
Rank	Lane	Name	Nationality	Time	Notes
1st place, gold medalist(s)	5	Stephanie Rice	Australia	2:08.45	WR
2nd place, silver medalist(s)	4	Kirsty Coventry	Zimbabwe	2:08.59	AF
3rd place, bronze medalist(s)	6	Natalie Coughlin	United States	2:10.34	
4	3	Katie Hoff	United States	2:10.68	
5	2	Alicia Coutts	Australia	2:11.43	
6	8	Asami Kitagawa	Japan	2:11.56	NR
7	7	Julia Wilkinson	Canada	2:12.43	
8	1	Katarzyna Baranowska	Poland	2:13.36	
