= Katharina Schiller =

German swimmer

Personal information
- Nationality: Germany
- Born: 22 June 1984 (age 42) Hildesheim, Lower Saxony, West Germany
- Height: 1.75 m (5 ft 9 in)
- Weight: 61 kg (134 lb)

Sport
- Sport: Swimming
- Strokes: Freestyle, medley
- Club: VfV Hildesheim
- Coach: Jacqueline Zenner
Medal record
Women's swimming
Representing Germany
Universiade
Bronze medal – third place	2007 Bangkok	4×100 m freestyle

Katharina Schiller (born 22 June 1984 in Hildesheim) is a German swimmer, who specialized in freestyle and individual medley events. Schiller won a bronze medal, as a member of the German swimming team, at the 2007 Summer Universiade in Bangkok, Thailand with a final time of 3:42.68. Schiller is a member of the swimming team for VfV Hildesheim, and is coached and trained by Jacqueline Zenner. She is also a graduate of mathematics and sports science at the University of Hildesheim.

Schiller qualified for two swimming events at the 2008 Summer Olympics in Beijing, by finishing ahead of Sonja Schöber in the 200 m individual medley from the German Olympic trials, in a FINA A-standard entry time of 2:13.47. On the first night of the Games, Schiller challenged seven other swimmers in the second heat of the 400 m individual medley, including former Olympic bronze medalist Georgina Bardach of Argentina. She edged out Bardach to a seventh place sprint (thirty-third overall) by a nine-second margin, with a time of 4:51.52. In the 200 m individual medley, Schiller finished dead-last on the fourth heat with a time of 2:18.00. Schiller failed to qualify for the semifinals, as she placed thirtieth out of 39 swimmers in the preliminary heats.
