= Swimming at the 2007 Summer Universiade =

Swimming at the XXIV Summer Universiade
- Venues: Thammasat University Swimming Pool
- Dates: 9 August 2007 – 14 August 2007

The Swimming competition of the 24th Summer Universiade was August 9–14, 2007 in Bangkok, Thailand. It consisted of 40 long course (50m) events (20 male, 20 female).

== Participating nations ==
Swimmers from 68 nations competed in the 2007 World University Games, coming from:

- Australia
- Austria
- Bahamas
- Belarus
- Brazil
- Canada
- China
- Chinese Taipei
- Colombia
- Republic of the Congo
- Cook Islands
- Croatia
- Czech Republic
- Estonia
- France
- Germany
- Great Britain
- Greece
- Honduras
- Hong Kong
- Hungary
- India
- Indonesia
- Ireland
- Israel
- Italy
- Japan
- Kazakhstan
- Kenya
- Laos
- Lebanon
- Lithuania
- Macau
- Maldives
- Mexico
- Federated States of Micronesia
- Moldova
- Mozambique
- Namibia
- Netherlands Antilles
- New Zealand
- Panama
- Paraguay
- Peru
- Philippines
- Poland
- Portugal
- Qatar
- Romania
- Russia
- San Marino
- Serbia
- Singapore
- Slovakia
- South Africa
- Slovenia
- South Korea
- Spain
- Sri Lanka
- Sweden
- Switzerland
- Thailand
- Turkey
- Uganda
- Ukraine
- United States
- Vietnam
- Virgin Islands

== Results ==
=== Men's events ===
Event	Gold		Silver		Bronze	
50 m freestyle	Nicholas Santos (BRA)	22.12 UR	Jonathon Newton (AUS)	22.33	Donald Goodrich (USA)	22.39
100 m freestyle	Andrey Grechin (RUS)	49.29	Adam Ritter (USA)	49.70	Fernando Silva (BRA)	49.71
200 m freestyle	Adam Ritter (USA)	1:47.42 UR	Andrew Hunter (GBR)	1:48.17	Brian Johns (CAN)	1:48.29
400 m freestyle	Dragoş Coman (ROU)	3:48.29 UR	Michael Klueh (USA)	3:49.10	Yury Prilukov (RUS)	3:49.19
800 m freestyle	Chad La Tourette (USA)	7:49.90 UR	Yury Prilukov (RUS)	7:50.49	Sergiy Fesenko (UKR)	7:52.41
1500 m freestyle	Chad La Tourette (USA)	15:00.26 UR	Sergiy Fesenko (UKR)	15:10.81	Michael Klueh (USA)	15:13.04
50 m backstroke	Helge Meeuw (GER)	25.42 UR	Junya Koga (JPN)	25.43	Matthew Clay (GBR)	25.44
100 m backstroke	Helge Meeuw (GER)	54.21	Markus Rogan (AUT)	54.27	Nick Thoman (USA)	54.62
200 m backstroke	Markus Rogan (AUT)	1:56.66 UR	Takashi Nakano (JPN)	1:58.14	Nick Thoman (USA)	1:58.61
50 m breaststroke	Igor Borysik (UKR)	27.74	Felipe Lima (BRA)	27.94	Darren Mew (GBR)	27.95
100 m breaststroke	Valeriy Dymo (UKR)	1:01.27	Grigory Falko (RUS)	1:01.33	Scott Dickens (CAN)	1:01.42
200 m breaststroke	Grigory Falko (RUS)	2:12.89	Ryan Hurley (USA)	2:13.24	Vladislav Polyakov (KAZ)	2:13.53
50 m butterfly	Sergiy Breus (UKR)	23.71	Nicholas Santos (BRA)	23.74	Evgeny Korotyshkin (RUS)	23.86
100 m butterfly	Darryl Rudolf (CAN)	52.89	Takashi Tomiyama (JPN)	52.97	Sergii Breus (UKR)	53.01
200 m butterfly	Ryusuke Sakata (JPN)	1:55.92 UR	Chen Yin (CHN)	1:56.59	Daniel Madwed (USA)	1:57.16
200 m individual medley	Brian Johns (CAN)	1:59.97 UR	Ken Takakuwa (JPN)	2:00.09	Lukasz Wojt (POL)	2:00.32
400 m individual medley	Patrick Mellors (USA)	4:12.94 UR	Alex Vanderkaay (USA)	4:17.34	Federico Turrini (ITA)	4:19.96
4×100 m freestyle relay	United States (USA); Matthew McGinnis; Matt Grevers; Bryan Lundquist; Adam Ritter	3:16.06 UR	Canada (CAN); Richard Hortness; Brian Johns; Chad Hankewich; Darryl Rudolf	3:18.57	Russia (RUS); Evgeny Lagunov; Sergey Perunin; Andrey Grechin; Yury Prilukov	3:18.73
4×200 m freestyle relay	United States (USA); Matthew McGinnis; Adam Ritter; Doug Van Wie; Michael Klueh	7:13.72 UR	Russia (RUS); Evgeny Lagunov; Sergey Perunin; Nikita Lobintsev; Yury Prilukov	7:16.20	Italy (ITA); Andrea Busato; Michele Cosentino; Andrea Giavi; Nicola Cassio	7:17.93
4×100 m medley relay	Russia (RUS); Dmitri Smirnov; Grigory Falko; Evgeny Korotyshkin; Andrey Grechin	3:36.17 UR	United States (USA); Nick Thoman; Matthew Lowe; Matt Grevers; Adam Ritter	3:37.42	Ukraine (UKR); Andriy Oleynyk; Valeriy Dymo; Sergiy Breus; Yuriy Yegoshin	3:37.74

Legend: WR – World record; UR – Universiade record

=== Women's events ===
Event	Gold		Silver		Bronze	
50 m freestyle	Britta Steffen (GER)	24.87 UR	Aliaksandra Herasimenia (BLR)	25.01	Alice Mills (AUS)	25.11
100 m freestyle	Britta Steffen (GER)	54.36 UR	Andrea Hupman (USA)	55.36	Alice Mills (AUS)	55.40
200 m freestyle	Federica Pellegrini (ITA)	1:57.67 UR	Sara Isakovič (SLO)	1:58.19	Kate Dwelley (USA)	1:59.35
400 m freestyle	Federica Pellegrini (ITA)	4:06.11 UR	Coralie Balmy (FRA)	4:10.08	Jordis Steinegger (AUT)	4:11.88
800 m freestyle	Flavia Rigamonti (SUI)	8:25.59 UR	Federica Pellegrini (ITA)	8:34.97	Kelsey Ditto (USA)	8:35.30
1500 m freestyle	Flavia Rigamonti (SUI)	16:05.90 UR	Chika Yonenaga (JPN)	16:27.86	Kelsey Ditto (USA)	16:36.31
50 m backstroke	Aya Terakawa (JPN)	28.61 UR	Aliaksandra Herasimenia (BLR)	28.70	Sviatlana Khakhlova (BLR)	28.83
100 m backstroke	Aya Terakawa (JPN)	1:01.50	Kateryna Zubkova (UKR)	1:01.67	Chen Yanyan (CHN)	1:01.89
200 m backstroke	Kelly Harrigan (USA)	2:11.48	Melissa Ingram (NZL)	2:11.98	Takami Igarashi (JPN)	2:12.04
50 m breaststroke	Janne Schäfer (GER)	30.99	Sarah Katsoulis (AUS)	31.51	Alice Mills (AUS)	31.78
100 m breaststroke	Nanaka Tamura (JPN)	1:08.33	Sarah Katsoulis (AUS)	1:08.42	Mirna Jukić (AUT)	1:08.53
200 m breaststroke	Jung Seul-Ki (KOR)	2:24.67 UR	Rie Kaneto (JPN)	2:25.63	Annamay Pierse (CAN)	2:25.73
50 m butterfly	Fabienne Nadarajah (AUT)	26.81	Yuka Kato (JPN)	26.82	Masae Oshimi (JPN)	26.82
100 m butterfly	MacKenzie Downing (CAN)	58.88	Irina Bespalova (RUS)	59.02	Xu Yanwei (CHN)	59.22
200 m butterfly	Audrey Lacroix (CAN)	2:06.83 UR	MacKenzie Downing (CAN)	2:08.83	Sara Isakovič (SLO)	2:09.45
200 m individual medley	Kaitlin Sandeno (USA)	2:12.13 UR	Yana Klochkova (UKR)	2:13.15	Alice Mills (AUS)	2:14.37
400 m individual medley	Yana Klochkova (UKR)	4:37.50 UR	Kaitlin Sandeno (USA)	4:41.57	Zhang Xin (CHN)	4:42.49
4×100 m freestyle relay	United States (USA); Emily Silver; Kara Denby; Courtney Cashion; Andrea Hupman	3:40.85 UR	China (CHN); Xu Yanwei; Chen Yanyan; Zhu Yingwen; Pang Jiaying	3:41.38	Germany (GER); Britta Steffen; Sonja Schöber; Annika Lurz; Katharina Schiller	3:42.68
4×200 m freestyle relay	United States (USA); Kate Dwelley; Erin Reilly; Lindsey Smith; Kaitlin Sandeno	7:57.87 UR	China (CHN); Tan Miao; Xu Yanwei; Zhu Yingwen; Pang Jiaying	7:58.28	Italy (ITA); Flavia Zoccari; Roberta Ioppi; Alice Carpanese; Federica Pellegrini	8:01.11
4×100 m medley relay	Japan (JPN); Aya Terakawa; Nanaka Tamura; Yuka Kato; Norie Urabe	4:03.11 UR	United States (USA); Brooke Bishop; Ellie Weberg; Elaine Breeden; Emily Silver	4:03.96	Canada (CAN); Kelly Stefanyshyn; Annamay Pierse; MacKenzie Downing; Seanna Mitchell	4:04.52

Legend: WR – World record; UR – Universiade record

=== Medal standings ===
Rank	Nation	Gold	Silver	Bronze	Total
1	United States (USA)	10	8	8	26
2	Japan (JPN)	5	7	2	14
3	Germany (GER)	5	0	1	6
4	Ukraine (UKR)	4	3	4	11
5	Canada (CAN)	4	2	4	10
6	Russia (RUS)	3	4	4	11
7	Italy (ITA)	2	1	3	6
8	Austria (AUT)	2	1	2	5
9	Switzerland (SUI)	2	0	0	2
10	Brazil (BRA)	1	2	1	4
11	Romania (ROU)	1	0	0	1
11	South Korea (KOR)	1	0	0	1
13	China (CHN)	0	3	3	6
14	Australia (AUS)	0	3	2	5
15	Belarus (BLR)	0	2	1	3
16	Great Britain (GBR)	0	1	2	3
17	Slovenia (SLO)	0	1	1	2
18	France (FRA)	0	1	0	1
18	New Zealand (NZL)	0	1	0	1
20	Kazakhstan (KAZ)	0	0	1	1
20	Poland (POL)	0	0	1	1
Totals (21 entries)		40	40	40	120

== See also ==
- 2007 in swimming
