= Nicola Cassio =

Italian swimmer (born 1985)

Medal record

Men's swimming

Representing Italy

World Championships (SC)
Gold medal – first place	2006 Shanghai	4 x 200 m freestyle
Bronze medal – third place	2008 Manchester	4×200 m freestyle

European Aquatics Championships (LC)
Gold medal – first place	2006 Budapest	4x200m Freestyle
Gold medal – first place	2008 Eindhoven	4×200 m freestyle

Universiades
Gold medal – first place	2005 Izmir	4×200 m freestyle
Silver medal – second place	2009 Belgrade	4×100 m freestyle
Silver medal – second place	2009 Belgrade	4×100 m medley
Bronze medal – third place	2007 Bangkok	4×200 m freestyle

Nicola Cassio (born 9 July 1985 in Trieste) is an Italian freestyle swimmer.

Cassio won several medals mainly as a member of the Italian 4 x 200 m freestyle relay. He participated for Italy in the 2008 Summer Olympics.
