= Kolubara Stadium =

Football stadium in Lazarevac, Serbia

- Interactive map of Kolubara Stadium
- Location: Lazarevac, Serbia
- Coordinates: 44°23′2.0″N 20°15′58.5″E
- Capacity: 2,500

Construction
- Opened: 1968

Tenants
- FK Kolubara; ŽFK Kolubara

Kolubara Stadium is a football stadium in Lazarevac, Serbia. Built in 1968, it is the home ground of the football club, FK Kolubara and the women's team, ŽFK Kolubara. The stadium has a capacity of 2,500 spectators.

== History ==
The stadium was built in 1968. For many years, there had been no major renovations, except for necessary works to keep the ground in sufficient condition and fulfill the standard requirements. When Bojan Stević, the local head of the ruling Serbian Progressive Party, became a new president of FK Kolubara at the end of 2012, he promised improvements on club's infrastructure Renovation works of the stadium started in early 2014. During modernization an already existing main stand on the west side was refurbished and a completely new east stand was erected. A secondary astroturf pitch was also added next to the stadium. Due to redevelopment, the total capacity of the stadium was increased to 2,500. Opening ceremony of renewed facility took place on 6 October 2015. In 2019 the stadium received 1,500 lux artificial lightning by setting four 42-meters-high floodlight masts in the corners, equipped with LED lamps (it was the sixteenth stadium in Serbia to have artificial lightning and the second that uses LED technology). During the 2019/20 season a roof was added to the eastern stand.

In 1983 the host team, FK Kolubara, achieved the first major success by advancing to the Yugoslav Second League. Placement in the higher division was secured in round before the end of 1982–83 season, when the club defeated FK Mačva Šabac at the home ground in front of 6000 spectators. In the same year the club became the amateur vice-champion of Yugoslavia. FK Kolubara played in the Yugoslav Second League for two seasons, until 1985.

For the second time the club competed at the second national level in the period of Federal Republic of Yugoslavia, between 1998 and 2002. Second-level competitions returned to Kolubara Stadium, when the hosts advanced to Serbian Prva liga in 2008.

On 6 June 2010, the final game of the 2009–10 First League season played in Kolubara Stadium turned into a scandal. If the hosts had won against FK Teleoptik, they would have earned a historical promotion to the top flight. However, in the 86th minute the result was 0:1. Then the hosts scored a goal, which was disallowed by the referee. Unsatisfied fans entered the pitch and started to chase the referee, who was eventually saved by the police. FK Kolubara players left the field and the match was not continued. The result of the game was turned into walkover for FK Teleoptik and instead of FK Kolubara, FK Sevojno gained promotion by using its chance and winning their last game of the season.

The team continued to play in the First League until 2013, when it was relegated, but after one year they returned to the second division. In 2017 Kolubara was dropped again to Serbian League Belgrade and returned to the First League after two seasons, in 2019, at the centenary of the club's existence.

In 2021 FK Kolubara was promoted for the first time in history to the Serbian SuperLiga. The club assured promotion on 15 May 2021 at the home ground, in the penultimate game of the season, winning 3:1 against FK Borac Čačak. The first match of SuperLiga at the Kolubara Stadium took place on 26 July 2021. In their second game of the season, FK Kolubara played against FK Radnik Surdulica. The game ended with 1:1 draw.

Kolubara Stadium is also a venue for women's football team ŽFK Kolubara. In 2020/21 season they played in the Serbian Women's Super League.

The stadium also hosts some games of women's national football teams:

- 24 September 2005: Serbia and Montenegro – Norway 0:4 (World Cup qualification)
- 6 November 2018: Serbia – Russia 0:1 (friendly game)
- 6 March 2020: Serbia – North Macedonia 8:1 (European Championship qualification)

Some games of men's and women's football tournament at 2009 Summer Universiade were also held at this stadium.
