= Alex Vanderkaay =

American swimmer

Personal information
- Full name: Alexander Vanderkaay
- Nickname: "AVK"
- National team: United States
- Born: June 21, 1986 (age 40) Rochester, Michigan, U.S.
- Height: 6 ft 0 in (1.83 m)

Sport
- Sport: Swimming
- Strokes: Medley, Freestyle, Butterfly
- Club: Club Wolverine
- College team: University of Michigan
Medal record
Men's swimming
Representing the United States
Summer Universiade
Gold medal – first place	2009 Belgrade	200 m medley
Silver medal – second place	2007 Bangkok	400 m medley
Silver medal – second place	2009 Belgrade	400 m medley
Silver medal – second place	2009 Belgrade	4×200 m freestyle relay

Alex Vanderkaay (born June 21, 1986) is an American competition swimmer. At the 2007 World University Games, Vanderkaay won the silver medal in the 400-meter individual medley (IM). At the 2009 World University Games, he won the gold medal in the 200-meter IM and again the silver medal in the 400-meter IM. While attending the University of Michigan, Vanderkaay swam for the Michigan Wolverines swimming and diving team. He was the national college champion in the 400-yard IM in 2007 and 2008.

Vanderkaay is the younger brother of former Michigan swimmers Christian Vanderkaay and four-time Olympic medalist Peter Vanderkaay, and older brother of current Michigan swimmer Dane Vanderkaay. Vanderkaay is currently a Senior Engagement Manager in the Healthcare industry for the New York–based, Flatiron Health.
