= Lyndsay DePaul =

American swimmer

Personal information
- Nationality: USA
- Born: November 30, 1988 (age 37) Orange, California, U.S.
- Height: 5 ft 6 in (1.68 m)

Sport
- Sport: Swimming
- Strokes: Butterfly, Individual medley
- Club: Mission Viejo Nadadores
- College team: USC
Medal record
Women's swimming
Representing the United States
Pan American Games
Silver medal – second place	2011 Guadalajara	200 m butterfly
Summer Universiade
Silver medal – second place	2009 Belgrade	200 m butterfly
Silver medal – second place	2009 Belgrade	400 m medley
Silver medal – second place	2011 Shenzhen	4x100 m medley

Lyndsay DePaul (born November 30, 1988) is an American swimmer.

== Career ==
At the 2009 World University Games, DePaul won a silver medal in the 400 m individual medley and 200 m butterfly. This last March, she finished 2nd in the 100 fly and 3rd in the 200 fly at the Women's NCAA Division 1 Championships.

At the 2010 Long Course National Championships, she finished 6th place in the 100 meter butterfly and 9th place in the 200 meter butterfly. She finished the season being ranked 15th in the world in the 200 meter butterfly.

At the 2010 Short Course National Championships, she won her first national title in the 100 yard butterfly and was 2nd in the 200 butterfly behind her teammate, Katinka Hosszu.
