= Emily Silver =

American swimmer

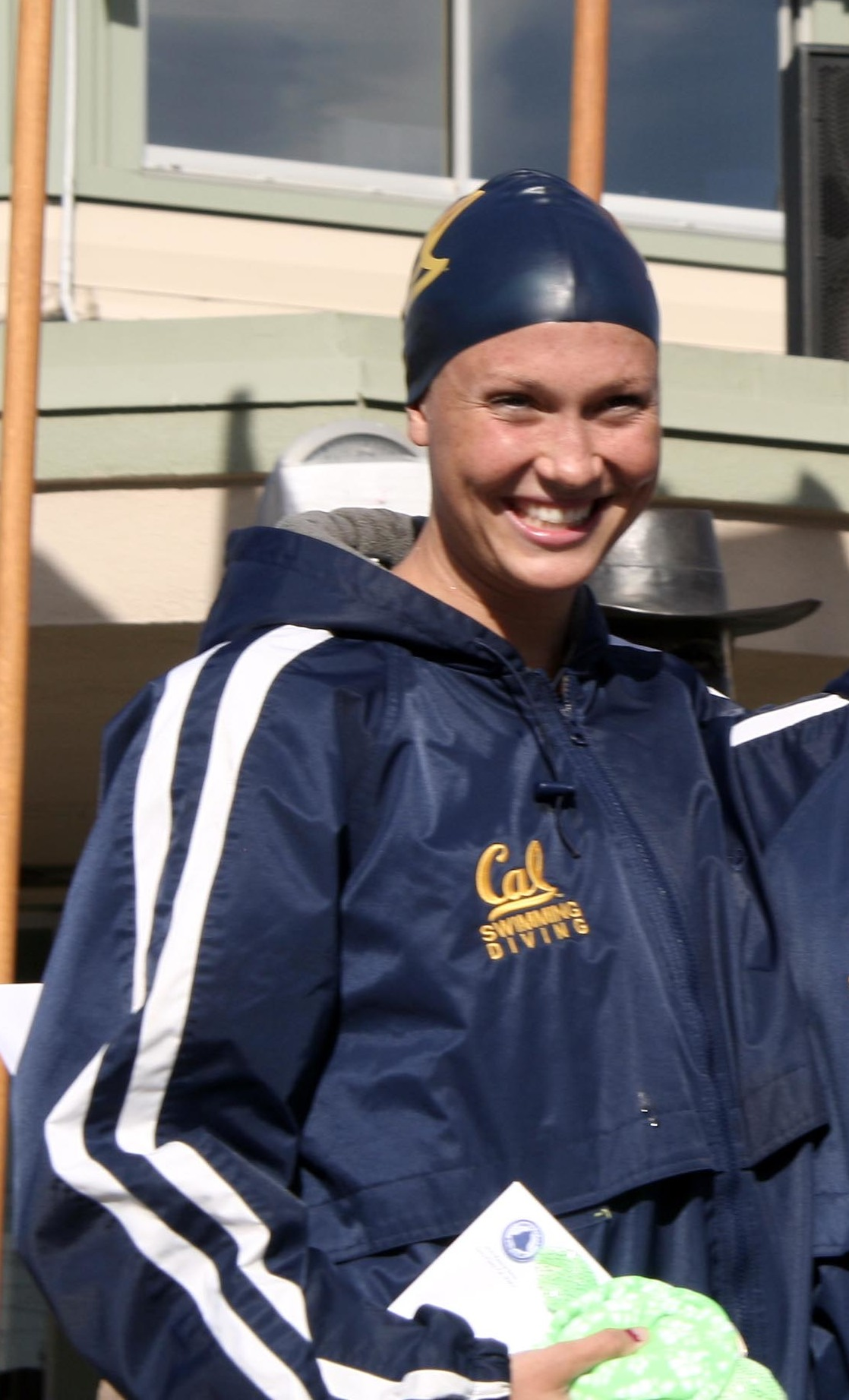
- Silver in 2007

Personal information
- Full name: Emily Susan Silver
- National team: United States
- Born: October 9, 1985 (age 40) St. Petersburg, Florida, U.S.
- Height: 5 ft 11 in (180 cm)
- Weight: 154 lb (70 kg)

Sport
- Sport: Swimming
- Strokes: Butterfly, freestyle, medley
- Club: California Aquatics
- College team: University of California, Berkeley
- Coach: Teri McKeever (Berkeley)
Medal record
Women's swimming
Representing the United States
Olympic Games
Silver medal – second place	2008 Beijing	4×100 m freestyle
World Championships (LC)
Bronze medal – third place	2005 Montreal	4×100 m freestyle
World Championships (SC)
Gold medal – first place	2008 Manchester	4×100 m medley
Universiade
Gold medal – first place	2007 Bangkok	4×100 m freestyle
Silver medal – second place	2007 Bangkok	4×100 m medley

Emily Susan Silver (born October 9, 1985) is an American competitive swimmer, Olympic medalist, and swim coach. She was a member of the silver-medal-winning U.S. team of the 4×100 metre freestyle relay at the 2008 Summer Olympics. She competed alongside fellow American swimmers Natalie Coughlin, Lacey Nymeyer and Kara Lynn Joyce. Silver overcame a broken hand suffered in the U.S. Olympic Trials, returning after a few weeks to compete at the 2008 Olympic Games.

Silver attended the University of California, Berkeley, where she swam for coach Teri McKeever's California Golden Bears swimming and diving team in National Collegiate Athletic Association (NCAA) and Pacific-10 Conference competition. She was named team MVP as a freshman and served as co-captain of the team in 2007–08. She achieved All-American status in twenty different events including the 50, 100 and 200-yard freestyle, 400 and 800-yard freestyle relays, among others. Silver was the 2007 Pac-10 champion in the 100 and 200-yard freestyle. She also set the school record in the 50-yard freestyle in 2007, breaking future U.S. swimming teammate Natalie Coughlin's record.

Silver's post-swimming career highlights include a two-year stint as Athlete Relations Manager for USA Swimming. Her responsibilities included managing the swimmers who were a part of USA Swimming’s Athlete Partnership Agreement, and overseeing the USA Swimming Family Program. She also worked for lululemon athletica, coordinating promotional events and managing a research and development program. Silver was hired as a Marketing Communications Associate by SwimOutlet.com, where her duties will include social media, sports marketing and public relations.

Silver currently coaches the junior and masters swim teams at Seattle's Washington Athletic Club.

== Career ==
At the 2005 World Championships in Montreal, Quebec, Silver earned a bronze medal swimming in the heats of the 4 × 100 m freestyle relay.

At 2007 World University Games in Thailand, Silver won a gold medal in the 4 × 100 m freestyle and a silver in the 4 × 100 m medley relay.

At the 2008 FINA World Swimming Championships (25 m), Silver earned a gold medal swimming in the heats of the 4 × 100 m medley. She placed 8th in the 200 m individual medley, 100 m freestyle, and 100 m backstroke.

Silver is the niece of Larry Barbiere, a finalist in the men's 100-meter backstroke at the 1968 Summer Olympics.

2008 World Swimming Championships Manchester, England -Competed as member of U.S. Women’s swimming team -Silver medalist, 4 X 100 freestyle relay -Finalist in three individual events

2007 World University Games Bangkok - Competed as member of U.S. Women’s swimming team - Gold medalist, 4 X 100 freestyle relay - Silver medalist, 4 X 100 medley relay

2005 World Swimming Championships Montreal, Canada - Competed as member of U.S. Women’s swimming team - Silver medalist, 4 X 100 freestyle relay

USA Swimming National “A” Team - Selected as member of USA Swimming national team, 2005–06 and 2008–09

Women’s swimming, University of California, Berkeley - Team co-captain, 2007–08 - 20 All-American honors during four-year college career - 3-time American and NCAA record holder - 3-time individual champion, Pacific-10 Conference Championships

== See also ==
- List of Olympic medalists in swimming (women)
