= Frank Boateng =

Ghanaian footballer

Frank Azuma Boateng
Personal information
- Full name: Frank Azuma Boateng
- Date of birth: August 17, 1984 (age 42)
- Place of birth: Accra, Ghana
- Position: Midfielder

Team information
- Current team: Asante Kotoko
- Number: 7

Youth career
- 1997–1998: Zaytuna F.C.

Senior career*
Years	Team	Apps	(Gls)
2001–2008	Zaytuna F.C.	47	(2)
2008–2009	Sporting Mirren	16	(3)
2009–2012	Asante Kotoko	33	(3)
2012–2014	Al Egtmaaey Tripoli	15	(3)

International career
2009–	Ghana	1	(0)
- * Club domestic league appearances and goals

Frank Boateng (born August 17, 1984, in Accra, Ghana) is a Ghanaian footballer who played for Al Egtmaaey Tripoli.

== Club career ==
He began his career in the youth from Zamama F.C. and joined on 6 November 2008 to the newly promoted Ghana Premier League club Sporting Mirren. After his successful season with Sporting Mirren, left Boateng the club on 13 October 2009 to sign with Asante Kotoko.

== International career ==
Boateng was called up for the Ghana national football team for the friendly game on 1 October 2009 against the Argentina national football team and played in the game as his debut.
