= Tarik Marzouk =

Moroccan footballer

Tarik Merzouk
Personal information
- Full name: Tarik Merzouk
- Date of birth: February 13, 1982 (age 44)
- Place of birth: Kénitra, Morocco
- Height: 1.82 m (5 ft 11 1/2 in)
- Position: Forward

Team information
- Current team: Sheikh Russel KC
- Number: 20

Youth career
- ?–1999: KAC Kenitra

Senior career*
Years	Team	Apps	(Gls)
1999–2006	KAC Kenitra		
2006–2011	FAR Rabat		
2010	MAT Tétouan	3	(0)
2011–2012	KAC Kenitra	6	(0)
2012–	Sheikh Russel KC		
- * Club domestic league appearances and goals as of April 16, 2009 ‡ National team caps and goals as of October 17, 2008

Tarik Merzouk is a Moroccan footballer, who played for Sheikh Russel KC and other clubs.

== Career ==
=== Club ===
The midfielder played in his homeland for FAR Rabat, KAC Kenitra, and MAT Tétouan.

=== International ===
Marzouk played for FAR in the 2007 CAF Champions League group stages.
