= Seanna Mitchell =

Canadian swimmer (born 1988)

Personal information
- Full name: Seanna Mitchell
- National team: Canada
- Born: July 2, 1988 (age 38) Montreal, Quebec
- Height: 1.75 m (5 ft 9 in)
- Weight: 72 kg (159 lb)

Sport
- Sport: Swimming
- Strokes: Freestyle
- Club: Cascade Swim Club
- College team: University of Calgary
Medal record
Women's swimming
Pan American Games
Silver medal – second place	2007 Rio de Janeiro	4x100 m freestyle

Seanna Mitchell (born July 2, 1988 in Montreal, Quebec) is a female swimmer from Canada, who mostly competes in the freestyle events. She claimed a silver medal (4 × 100 m freestyle) at the 2007 Pan American Games in Rio de Janeiro, Brazil.
