= Roman Smutný =

Czech footballer (born 1985)

Personal information
- Date of birth: 22 April 1985 (age 41)
- Place of birth: Czechoslovakia
- Height: 1.82 m (5 ft 11 1/2 in)
- Position: Midfielder

Team information
- Current team: Kroměříž

Senior career*
Years	Team	Apps	(Gls)
2002–2005	Drnovice	11	(0)
2003–2005	→ Prostějov (loan)		
2005–2010	Brno	15	(0)
2006–2007	→ Bystrc (loan)		
2008	→ Fulnek (loan)		
2008–2009	→ Kladno (loan)	6	(0)
2010–	Kroměříž		
- * Club domestic league appearances and goals as of 17 July 2009

Roman Smutný (born 22 April 1985) is a Czech footballer who plays for SK Hanácká Slavia Kroměříž.

== Career ==
Smutný began playing football for FK Drnovice, making 11 Gambrinus liga appearances for club. He joined 1. FC Brno in 2005, making 15 top flight appearances for the club before leaving in 2010. He also had a loan spell at SK Kladno during the 2008–09 Gambrinus liga season.
