= Federico Púa =

Uruguayan footballer (born 1988)

Personal information
- Full name: Federico Púa
- Date of birth: 8 February 1988 (age 38)
- Place of birth: Montevideo, Uruguay
- Height: 1.88 m (6 ft 2 in)
- Position: Midfielder

Youth career
- Peñarol

Senior career*
Years	Team	Apps	(Gls)
2008–2010	Peñarol		
2011	Unión Temuco		
2014	Playa Honda		

International career
2015–2016	Uruguay (university)		
Medal record
Men's football
Representing Uruguay
FISU America Games
Gold medal – first place	2016 Buenos Aires
- * Club domestic league appearances and goals

Federico Púa (born February 8, 1988, in Montevideo, Uruguay) is a former Uruguayan footballer who played as a midfielder.

== Teams ==
- (Uruguay) Peñarol 2008-2010
- (Chile) Unión Temuco 2011
- (Uruguay) Playa Honda 2014

== International ==
- Uruguay (university team) 2015–2016

== Honours ==
Uruguay (university)

- FISU America Games: 2016

== Personal life ==
He is son of the Uruguayan football manager Víctor Púa.
