= 2009 Summer Universiade =

Multi-sport event in Belgrade, Serbia

XXV Summer Universiade XXV Летња универзијада XXV Letnja univerzijada
- Host city: Belgrade, Serbia
- Nations: 122
- Athletes: 5,566
- Events: 15 sports
- Opening: July 1, 2009
- Closing: July 12, 2009
- Opened by: Prime Minister Mirko Cvetković
- Athlete's Oath: Ivana Đerisilo (volleyball)
- Judge's Oath: Ivanka Raković (waterpolo)
- Torch lighter: Petar Filipović-Kusturica (waterpolo)
- Main venue: Belgrade Arena
- Website: universiade-belgrade2009.org (archived)

Summer

Winter

The 2009 Summer Universiade, officially known as the XXV Summer Universiade, was celebrated in Belgrade, Serbia from July 1 to 12, 2009. The event has also been organised by a range of co-host cities near Belgrade, mostly in northern Serbia. It was the largest sporting event ever to be organised by the city. At this Universiade the biggest star was the Russian rhythmic gymnast Evgeniya Kanaeva, who won 5 gold medals. Russia was the leading nation in the medal table, with the most gold medals (27) and most medals (76).

== Bidding process ==
Bid cities
City	Country
Belgrade	Serbia and Montenegro
Monterrey	Mexico
Poznań	Poland

The bidding process for the 2009 Summer Universiade games began in early 2004. Together with Belgrade, another two cities bid for the event – Monterrey in Mexico and Poznań in Poland. Working in Belgrade's favour were the various major sporting events the city was awarded to host in the then-upcoming 2005–2007 period such as EuroBasket 2005, the 2005 European Volleyball Championship, the 2006 European Water Polo Championship, and the European Youth Olympic Festival 2007. Furthermore, the city launched two unsuccessful candidate bids to organize the Summer Olympic Games (1992 and 1996); for the 1992 Summer Olympics bidding process, Belgrade was eliminated in the third round of International Olympic Committee voting, with the games ultimately being awarded to Barcelona. Belgrade was also eliminated (this time in the first round) in the 1996 Summer Olympics bidding process, with said games ultimately being awarded to Atlanta.

On 10 January 2005, Belgrade was announced as the host city of the 2009 Summer Universiade in Innsbruck, Austria. The host city announcement ceremony was attended by the now-deceased Belgrade mayor Nenad Bogdanović.

== Mascot ==
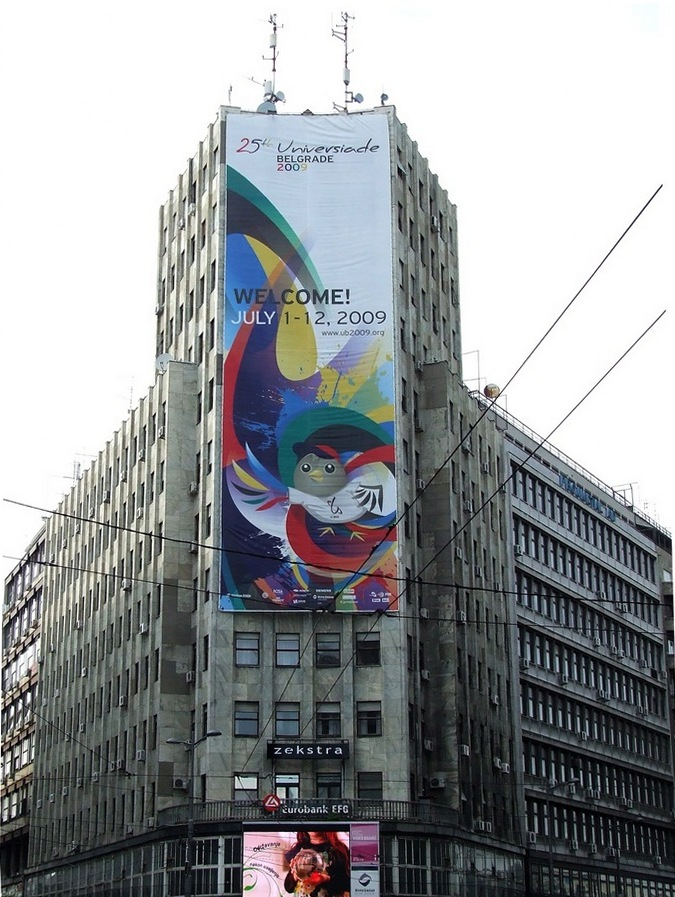
Srba – 2009 Summer Universiade mascot

The mascot of the 2009 Summer Universiade is a sparrow bird. The organisers chose the sparrow not only because of its symbolic ties to the host city but also because it represents a fast, dynamic and skillful bird, attributes needed for those competing at Universiade. The mascot received a new more modern look in 2009 and a competition began to name the Belgrade sparrow. The three final names for the sparrow were published in the Serbian media in April 2009, with the finalists being Srba, Cvrle and Dživdžan. The final voting was left to the 10,000 Universiade volunteers who overwhelmingly chose the name "Srba".

== Venues ==
The 2009 Summer Universiade took place in 69 venues across Belgrade and near bycities Inđija, Novi Sad, Obrenovac, Pančevo, Smederevo, Vršac and Zrenjanin. Obrenovac hosted the water polo and volleyball competition, Inđija, Pančevo and Vršac the basketball, Novi Sad the athletics and volleyball, while Zrenjanin hosted the swimming competition. The venue for each sport can be found on the official website of the 2009 Summer Universiade in Belgrade.

The opening and closing ceremonies took place at the Belgrade Arena, with a capacity of 20,000. A range of sports halls have undergone intense reconstruction to meet standards for the Universiade games. A number of venues were also newly constructed.

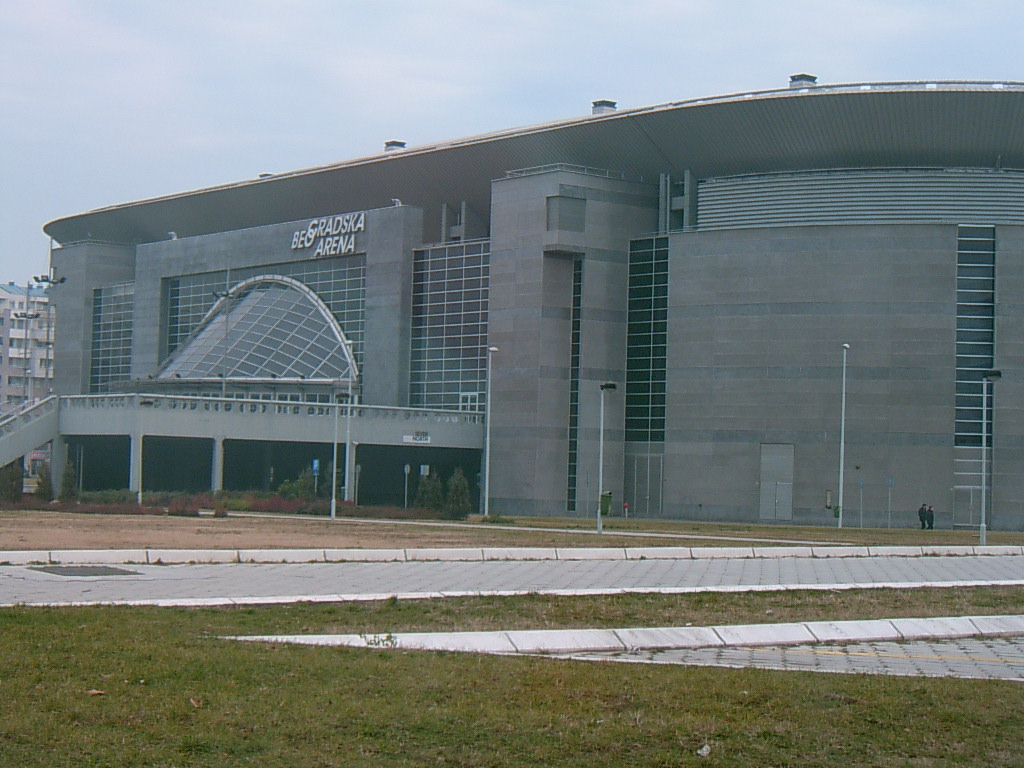
Belgrade Arena

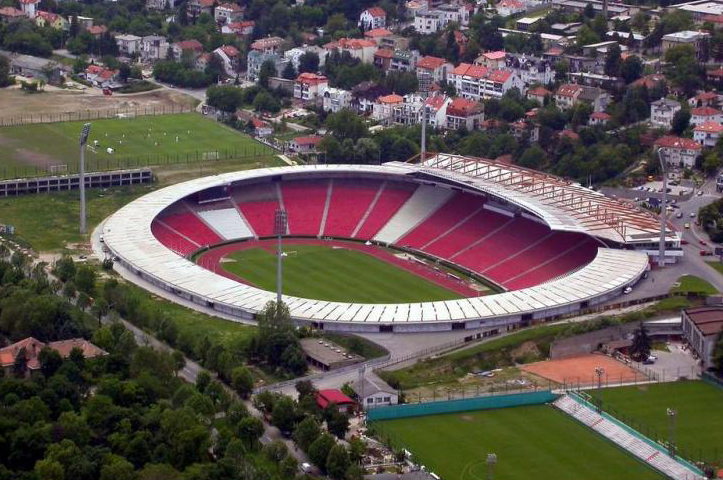
Red Star Stadium

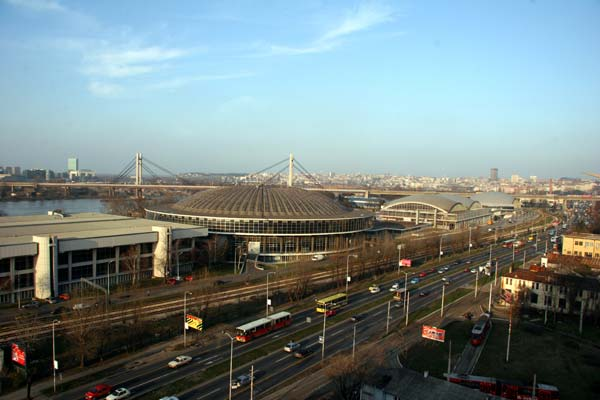
Belgrade Fair

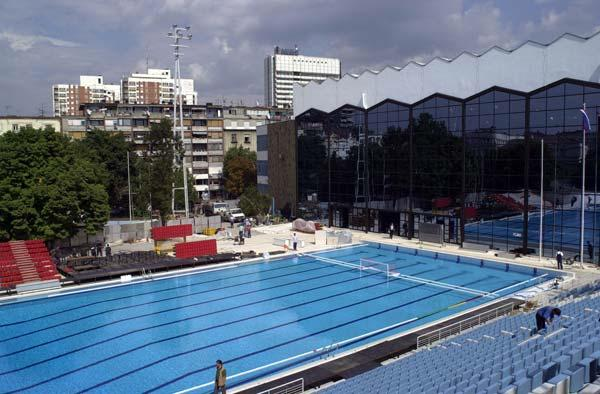
SRC Tašmajdan

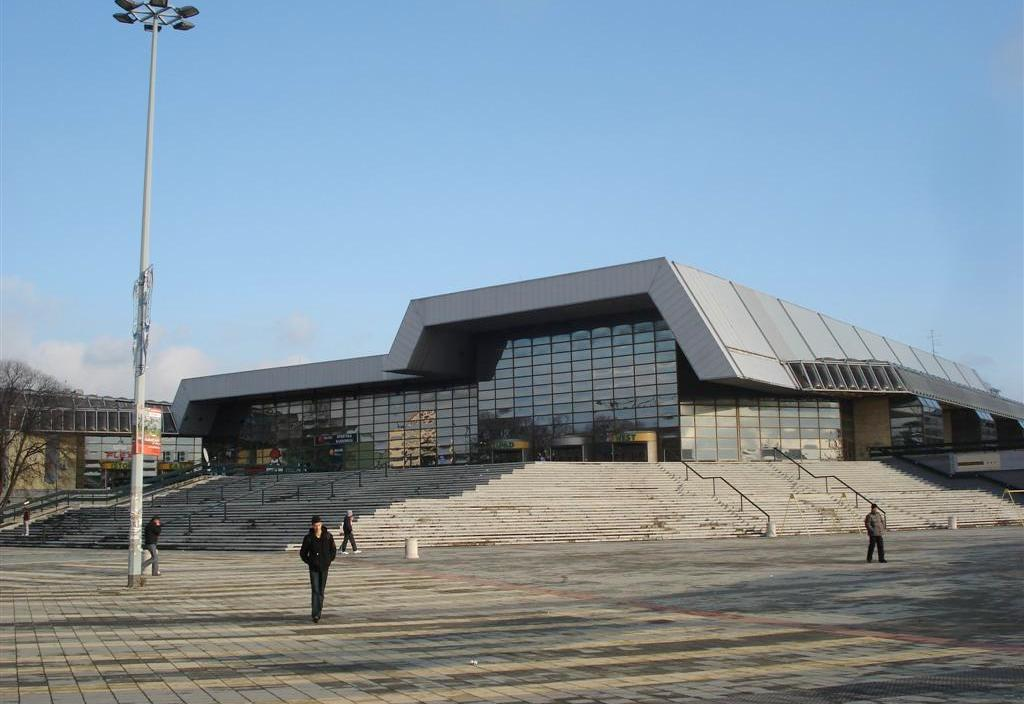
SPENS (Novi Sad)

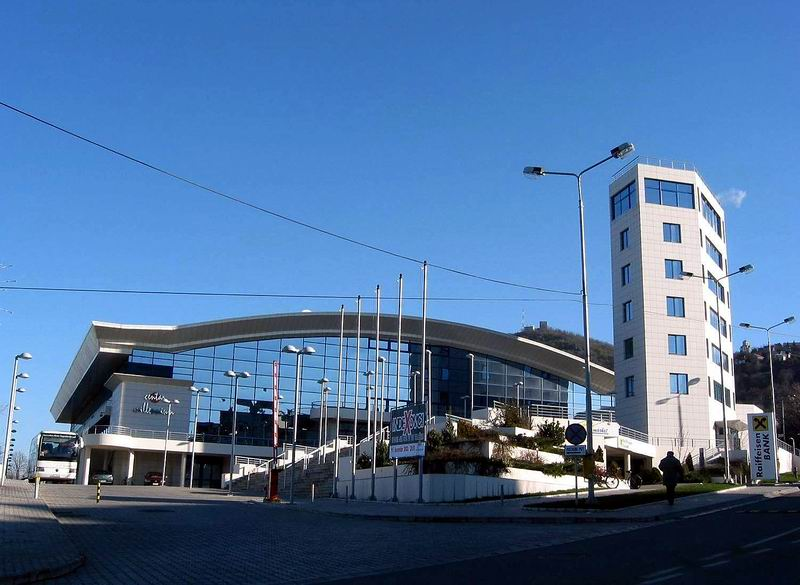
Millennium Center (Vršac)
- Belgrade Arena — ceremonies, basketball, gymnastics
- Stadion Crvena Zvezda — athletics
- Partizan Stadium — football (final)
- Tašmajdan Sports Centre Pool — swimming, diving
- Tašmajdan Sports Centre Tennis Court — tennis
- Belgrade Fair — judo, fencing, taekwondo
- Železnik Hall — basketball
- Železnik Stadium — football
- New Belgrade Sports Hall — basketball
- Dvorana Sumice — basketball
- FK Obilić Stadium — football
- Omladinski Stadium — football
- Lokomotiva Stadion — football
- Voždovac Stadium — football
- FK Srem Stadium — football
- FK Teleoptik Stadium — football
- FK Makiš Stadium — football
- SRK Banjica — water polo

=== Vršac ===
- Millennium Center — basketball

=== Novi Sad ===
- SPC Vojvodina — volleyball

=== Smederevo ===
- Smederevo City Stadium — football

=== Lazarevac ===
- FK Kolubara — football

=== Inđija ===
- Inđija Stadium — football

=== Jakovo ===
- FK Jakovo Stadium — football

=== Universiade Village ===
The Universiade Village was home to all athletes participating at the 2009 Summer Universiade games. Often referred to as Belville, the village has been newly built and comprises 14 buildings containing modern apartments. The Belville complex consists of a residential area comprising 120,000m², commercial and business facilities comprising 34,800m² and educational facilities comprising 6,100m². The complex also includes 22,000m² of office space. The Belville complex was completed in May 2009 and officially opened in June 2009. 2000 Apartments have been offered for sale in spring of 2008, and the new owners will be allowed to move in during October 2009.

Each building has been named after a flower. They are Iris Marigold, Dandelion, Violet, Lily of the Valley, Sunflower, Mimosa, Cyclamen, Gillyflower, Syringa, Jacinth, Rose, Tulipa, and Lily. During the construction of the village it was the largest development site in the Balkans. It is located in New Belgrade with the closest venues to it being Belgrade Arena (basketball and table tennis), EXPO XXI (taekwondo) and TK Gazela (tennis).

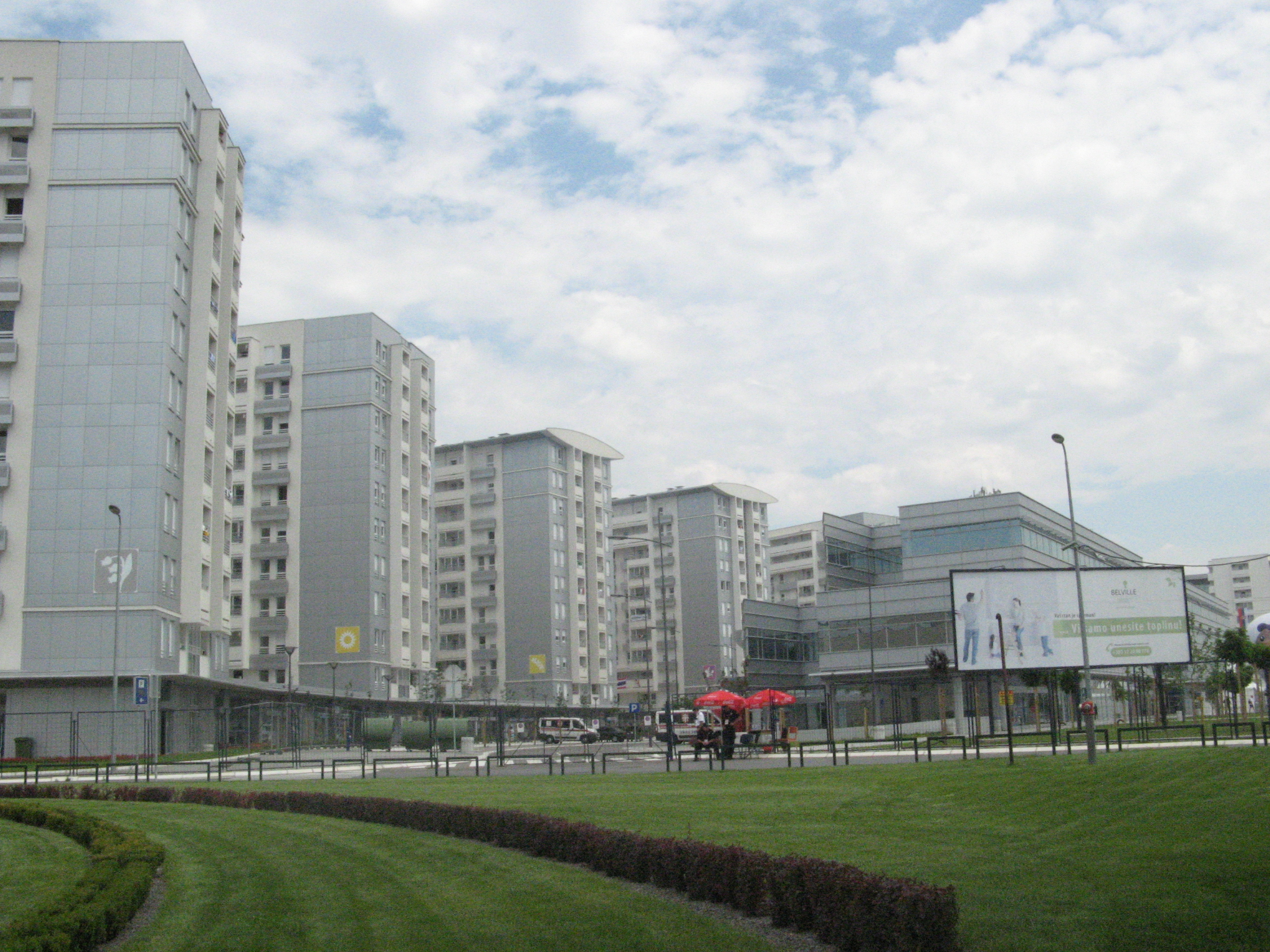
2009 Summer Universiade village

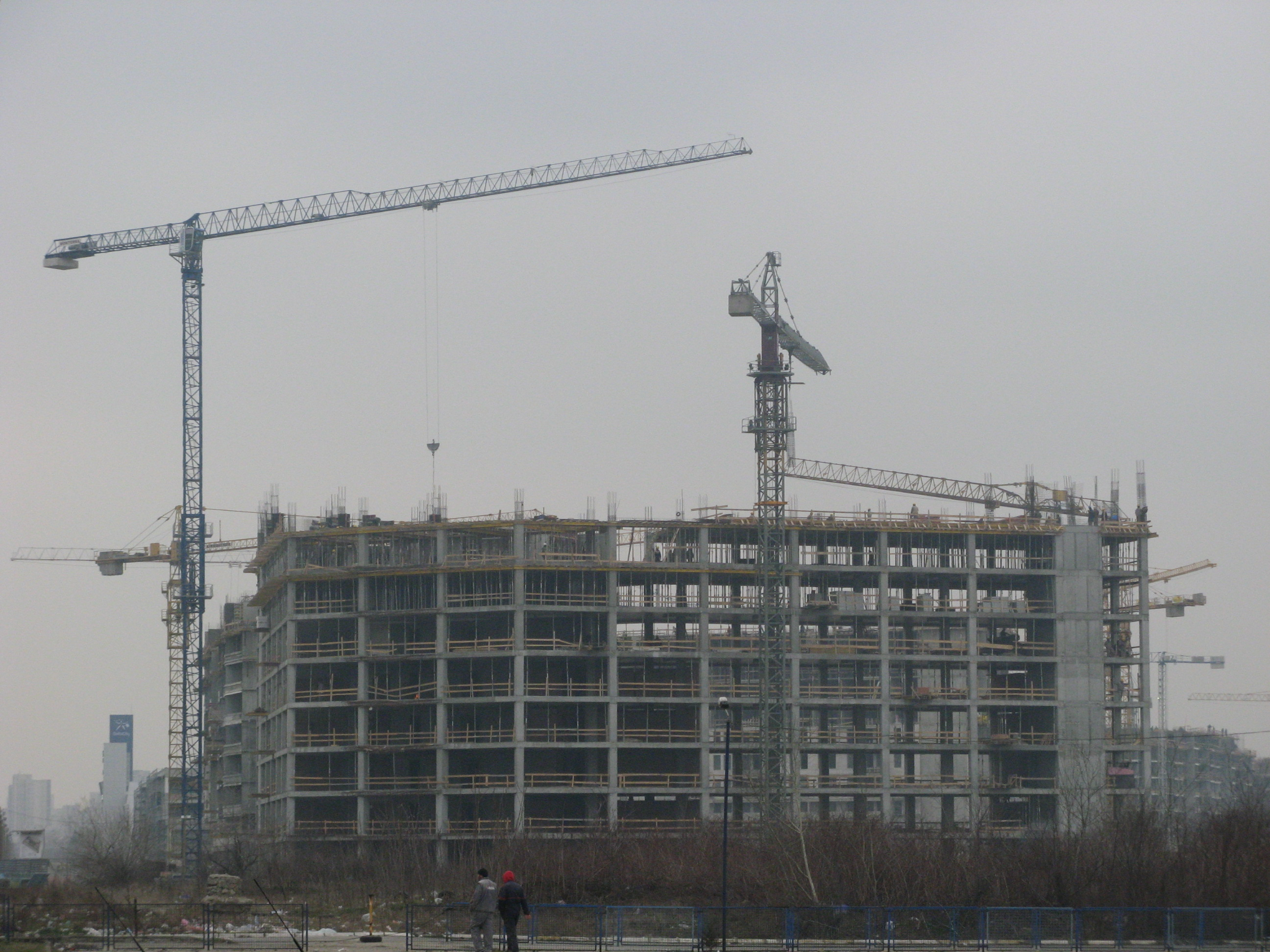
2009 Summer Universiade village under construction.

== Sports ==
- Archery ()
- Athletics ()
- Basketball ()
- Diving ()
- Fencing ()
- Football ()
- Gymnastics ()
- Judo ()
- Swimming ()
- Table tennis ()
- Taekwondo ()
- Tennis ()
- Volleyball ()
- Water polo ()

== Participants ==
- Afghanistan (3)
- Albania (4)
- Algeria (27)
- Angola (3)
- Argentina (9)
- Armenia (14)
- Australia (132)
- Austria (32)
- Azerbaijan (18)
- Bahrain (1)
- Belarus (24)
- Belgium (27)
- Benin (5)
- Bhutan (6)
- Bosnia and Herzegovina (37)
- Botswana (17)
- Brazil (129)
- Bulgaria (66)
- Burkina Faso (2)
- Canada (211)
- Chile (4)
- China (241)
- Colombia (7)
- Comoros (2)
- DR Congo (5)
- Congo (7)
- Costa Rica (5)
- Côte d'Ivoire
- Croatia (52)
- Cuba (9)
- Cyprus (21)
- Czech Republic (99)
- Denmark (18)
- Dominican Republic (3)
- Ecuador (8)
- Egypt (41)
- El Salvador (2)
- Equatorial Guinea (2)
- Estonia (59)
- Finland (52)
- France (165)
- Germany (116)
- Ghana (41)
- Great Britain (130)
- Greece (73)
- Guatemala (12)
- Guinea-Bissau
- Haiti (2)
- Honduras (5)
- Hong Kong, China (40)
- Hungary (131)
- Indonesia (11)
- Iran (41)
- Ireland (70)
- Israel (32)
- Italy (203)
- Japan (265)
- Jordan (13)
- Kazakhstan (65)
- Kenya (2)
- North Korea (24)
- South Korea (175)
- Kyrgyzstan (6)
- Latvia (39)
- Lebanon (40)
- Liberia (5)
- Libya (9)
- Lithuania (52)
- Macau, China (24)
- Macedonia (3)
- Madagascar (2)
- Maldives (2)
- Mexico (102)
- Moldova (22)
- Monaco (1)
- Mongolia (26)
- Montenegro (46)
- Morocco (32)
- Mozambique (11)
- Namibia (8)
- Netherlands (20)
- Netherlands Antilles (11)
- New Zealand (21)
- Nigeria (29)
- Norway (12)
- Oman (11)
- Pakistan (4)
- Panama (2)
- Paraguay (4)
- Peru (4)
- Poland (200)
- Portugal (46)
- Puerto Rico (1)
- Qatar (6)
- Romania (65)
- Russia (308)
- Saudi Arabia (29)
- Senegal (11)
- Serbia (280)
- Singapore (9)
- Slovakia (41)
- Slovenia (95)
- South Africa (113)
- Spain (102)
- Sri Lanka (14)
- Sudan (2)
- Swaziland (2)
- Sweden (62)
- Switzerland (56)
- Syria (5)
- Chinese Taipei (86)
- Tajikistan (2)
- Tanzania (1)
- Thailand (61)
- Togo (2)
- Tunisia (1)
- Turkey (88)
- Uganda (40)
- Ukraine (188)
- United Arab Emirates (24)
- United States (107)
- Uruguay (22)
- Uzbekistan (14)
- Vietnam (13)
- Virgin Islands (2)
- Zambia (9)
- Zimbabwe (2)

== Medal table ==
* Host nation (Serbia)

Rank	Nation	Gold	Silver	Bronze	Total
1	Russia (RUS)	27	22	27	76
2	China (CHN)	22	21	15	58
3	South Korea (KOR)	21	11	15	47
4	Japan (JPN)	20	21	32	73
5	United States (USA)	13	13	13	39
6	Ukraine (UKR)	7	11	13	31
7	Chinese Taipei (TPE)	7	5	5	17
8	Italy (ITA)	6	14	11	31
9	Poland (POL)	6	10	8	24
10	Serbia (SRB)*	5	5	9	19
11	Australia (AUS)	5	2	1	8
11	Iran (IRI)	5	2	1	8
13	France (FRA)	4	8	9	21
14	Belarus (BLR)	4	2	5	11
15	Spain (ESP)	4	0	6	10
16	Mexico (MEX)	3	5	5	13
17	Germany (GER)	3	3	11	17
18	Great Britain (GBR)	3	1	3	7
19	Switzerland (SUI)	3	1	1	5
20	Netherlands (NED)	3	0	2	5
20	Portugal (POR)	3	0	2	5
22	Canada (CAN)	2	7	6	15
23	South Africa (RSA)	2	2	5	9
23	Turkey (TUR)	2	2	5	9
25	Brazil (BRA)	2	2	2	6
26	Cuba (CUB)	2	1	2	5
27	Slovenia (SLO)	2	0	2	4
28	Azerbaijan (AZE)	2	0	0	2
28	Hong Kong (HKG)	2	0	0	2
30	North Korea (PRK)	1	3	4	8
31	Hungary (HUN)	1	2	5	8
32	Kazakhstan (KAZ)	1	2	4	7
33	New Zealand (NZL)	1	2	1	4
33	Romania (ROU)	1	2	1	4
35	Czech Republic (CZE)	1	1	4	6
36	Kenya (KEN)	1	1	1	3
36	Lithuania (LTU)	1	1	1	3
36	Moldova (MDA)	1	1	1	3
36	Senegal (SEN)	1	1	1	3
40	Bulgaria (BUL)	1	0	1	2
41	Honduras (HON)	1	0	0	1
41	Latvia (LAT)	1	0	0	1
41	Sweden (SWE)	1	0	0	1
44	Egypt (EGY)	0	2	4	6
45	Croatia (CRO)	0	2	1	3
45	Mongolia (MGL)	0	2	1	3
45	Vietnam (VIE)	0	2	1	3
48	Thailand (THA)	0	1	6	7
49	Slovakia (SVK)	0	1	3	4
50	Armenia (ARM)	0	1	2	3
50	Belgium (BEL)	0	1	2	3
52	Israel (ISR)	0	1	1	2
53	Algeria (ALG)	0	1	0	1
53	Austria (AUT)	0	1	0	1
53	Ecuador (ECU)	0	1	0	1
56	Denmark (DEN)	0	0	1	1
Totals (56 entries)		204	203	262	669

== Schedule ==
●	Opening Ceremony	●	Competitions	●	Finals	●	Closing Ceremony

June/July	30	01	02	03	04	05	06	07	08	09	10	11	12	Total
Ceremonies		●											●	
Archery											2	8		10
Athletics								2	6	10	9	9	10	46
Basketball												2		2
Diving					2	1	1	2	1	1	4			12
Fencing			2	2	2	2	2	2						12
Football											2			2
Artistic gymnastics			1	1	2	10								14
Rhythmic gymnastics											2	6		8
Judo								4	4	4	4	2		18
Swimming						4	5	5	7	4	7	8		40
Table tennis								2	1	2	2			7
Taekwondo			5	4	4	4	4							21
Tennis											2	5		7
Volleyball											1	1		2
Water polo												1	1	2
Total Gold Medals			8	7	10	21	12	17	19	21	35	42	11	203

== Broadcasting ==
The host broadcaster of the 2009 Summer Universiade was Serbia's RTS, the national broadcasting corporation. It used its first and second channel to broadcast the games as well as its digital channel. The games were produced and broadcast in high-definition television. Eurosport provided cable broadcasting to European nations.
