= Swimming at the 2007 World Aquatics Championships – Women's 50 metre freestyle =

The Women's 50m Freestyle at the 2007 World Aquatics Championships took place on 31 March (prelims & semifinals) and 1 April (finals) at Rod Laver Arena in Melbourne, Australia. A total of 143 swimmers were entered in the event; 138 swam the event.

The existing records at the start of the competition were:

- World Record (WR): 24.13, Inge de Bruijn (Netherlands), 22 September 2000 in Sydney, Australia.
- Championship Record (CR): 24.45, Inge de Bruijn (Netherlands), Fukuoka 2001 (Jul.28.2001).

== Results ==
=== Final ===
Place	Name	Nationality	Time	Note
1	Lisbeth Lenton	Australia	24.53	
2	Therese Alshammar	Sweden	24.62	
3	Marleen Veldhuis	Netherlands	24.70	
4	Britta Steffen	Germany	24.79	
5	Kara Lynn Joyce	USA	24.83	
6	Jodie Henry	Australia	24.96	
7	Malia Metella	France	25.02	
8	Natalie Coughlin	USA	25.31	

=== Semifinals ===
Rank	Name	Nationality	Time	Note
1	Marleen Veldhuis	Netherlands	24.79	Q
2	Kara Lynn Joyce	USA	24.80	Q
3	Therese Alshammar	Sweden	24.83	Q
4	Lisbeth Lenton	Australia	24.89	Q
5	Jodie Henry	Australia	25.06	Q
5	Britta Steffen	Germany	25.06	Q
7	Natalie Coughlin	USA	25.08	Q
8	Malia Metella	France	25.10	Q
9	Aleksandra Gerasimenya	Belarus	25.28	
10	XU Yanwei	China	25.31	
11	Francesca Halsall	Great Britain	25.32	
12	Anna-Karin Kammerling	Sweden	25.37	
13	Hanna-Maria Seppälä	Finland	25.47	
14	Inge Dekker	Netherlands	25.50	
15	Céline Couderc	France	25.54	
16	Erica Morningstar	Canada	25.61	

=== Prelims ===
Rank	Name	Nationality	Time	Note
1	Kara Lynn Joyce	USA	25.23	Q
2	Lisbeth Lenton	Australia	25.24	Q
3	Therese Alshammar	Sweden	25.34	Q
4	Britta Steffen	Germany	25.40	Q
5	XU Yanwei	China	25.41	Q
6	Jodie Henry	Australia	25.42	Q
7	Francesca Halsall	Great Britain	25.43	Q
8	Marleen Veldhuis	Netherlands	25.45	Q
9	Aleksandra Gerasimenya	Belarus	25.51	Q
10	Erica Morningstar	Canada	25.54	Q
10	Natalie Coughlin	USA	25.54	Q
12	Anna Karin Kammerling	Sweden	25.56	Q
13	Inge Dekker	Netherlands	25.60	Q
14	Hanna-Maria Seppälä	Finland	25.61	Q
15	Malia Metella	France	25.63	Q
16	Céline Couderc	France	25.70	Q
17	Sviatlana Khakhlova	Belarus	25.73	
18	Vanessa García	Puerto Rico	25.81	
19	Daniela Gotz	Germany	25.83	
20	Cristina Chiuso	Italy	25.85	
21	Oxana Serikova	Ukraine	25.93	
22	Arlene Semeco	Venezuela	26.10	
23	Flávia Delaroli	Brazil	26.13	
24	Jeanette Ottesen	Denmark	26.28	
25	Fabienne Nadarajah	Austria	26.41	
26	Triin Aljand	Estonia	26.52	
26	Lauren Boyle	New Zealand	26.52	
28	Jana Kolukanova	Estonia	26.55	
29	Victoria Poon	Canada	26.56	
30	Caroline Pickering	Fiji	26.57	
31	Marilies Demal	Austria	26.60	
31	Sze Hang Yu	Hong Kong	26.60	
33	Hannah Wilson	Hong Kong	26.64	
34	Ragnheidur Ragnarsdottir	Iceland	26.67	
35	Miroslava Najdanovski	Serbia	26.73	
36	Emily Vavourakis	Belgium	26.85	
37	Lee Keo-Ra	South Korea	26.87	
38	Sharntelle McLean	Trinidad and Tobago	26.89	
38	Petra Klosova	Czech Republic	26.89	
38	Pin Chieh Nieh	Chinese Taipei	26.89	
41	Tine Bossuyt	Belgium	26.92	
42	Ionela Cozma	Romania	27.00	
43	Ximena Vilar	Venezuela	27.04	
44	Lynette Ng	Singapore	27.09	
45	Karin Prinsloo	South Africa	27.12	
46	Natasha Moodie	Jamaica	27.24	
47	Carolina Colorado Henao	Colombia	27.26	
48	Yang Chin-Kuei	Chinese Taipei	27.28	
49	Madeleine Scerri	Malta	27.29	
50	Anna Stylianou	Cyprus	27.37	
51	Ruth Ho	Singapore	27.38	
52	Yamile Bahamonde	Ecuador	27.40	
53	Pannika Prachgosin	Thailand	27.41	
54	Sara Yasmine Chahed	Tunisia	27.42	
55	Heather Brand	Zimbabwe	27.43	
56	Nicole Marmol Gilbert	Ecuador	27.45	
57	Kimberly Eeson	Zimbabwe	27.67	
58	Anna-Liza Mopio-Jane	Papua New Guinea	27.70	
58	Ellen Hight	Zambia	27.70	
60	Cheok Mei Ma	Macau	27.71	
61	Alexia Pamela Benitez Quijada	El Salvador	27.82	
62	Irina Shlemova	Uzbekistan	27.88	
63	Marianela Quesada	Costa Rica	27.94	
64	Sharon Paola Fajardo Sierra	Honduras	28.03	
65	Kiera Aitken	Bermuda	28.04	
66	Veronica Vdovicenco	Moldova	28.06	
67	Felicia Leksono	Indonesia	28.14	
68	Nilshaira Isenia	Netherlands Antilles	28.21	
69	Rachel Ah Koy	Fiji	28.26	
70	Elena Popovska	Macedonia	28.29	
71	Nancy Suryaatmadja	Indonesia	28.31	
72	Khadija Ciss	Senegal	28.33	
73	Emma Hunter	Samoa	28.47	
74	Jessica Teixeira Vieira	Mozambique	28.64	
75	Parita Parekh	India	28.69	
76	Mariya Bugakova	Uzbekistan	28.70	
77	Marie Laura Meza	Costa Rica	28.71	
78	Rovena Marku	Albania	28.76	
79	Jakie Wellman	Zambia	28.77	
80	Ximene Gomes	Mozambique	28.81	
81	Massie Milagros Carrillo	Peru	28.82	
82	Razan Taha	Jordan	28.87	
83	Ngozi Monu	Nigeria	28.89	
84	Dohi Eliane Droubry	Côte d'Ivoire	28.92	
85	Tojohanitra Andriamanjatoprimamama	Madagascar	29.07	
86	Dalia Tórrez Zamora	Nicaragua	29.14	
87	Kshipra Mahajan	India	29.22	
88	Jonay Briedenhann	Namibia	29.27	
89	Danielle Beaubrun	Saint Lucia	29.30	
90	Judith Meauri	Papua New Guinea	29.38	
91	Miriam Hatamleh	Jordan	29.42	
92	Katerine Moreno	Bolivia	29.43	
93	Fiorella Gomez-Sanchez	Peru	29.51	
94	Chinyere Pigot	Suriname	29.55	
94	Karen Torrez	Bolivia	29.55	
96	Talisa Pace	Malta	29.58	
97	April Chang	Samoa	29.60	
98	Binta Zahra Diop	Senegal	29.65	
99	Sook Fun Chai	Malaysia	29.71	
100	Rachel Fortunato	Gibraltar	29.78	
101	Lacey Palmer-Martin	Saint Lucia	29.83	
102	Marike Meyer	Namibia	29.84	
102	Stephanie Anne Maitland	Seychelles	29.84	
104	Dashtserengiin Saintsetseg	Mongolia	30.00	
105	Shannon Austin	Seychelles	30.17	
106	Uche Monu	Nigeria	30.18	
107	Senele Dlamini	Swaziland	30.33	
108	Pina Ercolano	Kenya	30.36	
109	Aminath Rouya Hussain	Maldives	30.46	
110	Herinantenaina Ravoajanahary	Madagascar	30.50	
111	Rachel Lannen	Guam	30.53	
111	Prisca Rose	Mauritius	30.53	
113	Telmen Batjargal	Mongolia	30.61	
114	Diane Etiennette	Mauritius	30.63	
114	Olivia Aya Nakitanda	Uganda	30.63	
116	Kathryn Millin	Swaziland	30.73	
117	Sameera Al-Bitar	Brunei	31.12	
118	Sarah Elizabeth Johnson	Northern Mariana Islands	31.39	
119	Maria Gibbons	Palau	31.75	
120	Debra Daniel	(Federated States of Micronesia) Federated States of Micronesia	32.07	
121	Amber Yobech	Palau	32.10	
121	Maxine Pardo	Gibraltar	32.10	
123	Zakia Nassar	Palestine	32.17	
124	Julianne Kirchner	Marshall Islands	32.74	
125	Natasha Ratter	Uganda	33.10	
126	Teran Matthews	(Saint Vincent and the Grenadines) Saint Vincent and the Grenadines	33.18	
127	Magdalena Moshi	Tanzania	33.57	
128	Samphors Seng	Cambodia	34.25	
129	Karishma Karki	Nepal	34.97	
130	Vilayphone Vongphachanh	Laos	35.44	
131	Nahed Akhlif	Libya	36.47	
132	Elisabeth Nikiema	Burkina Faso	38.33	
133	Elsie Uwamahoro	Burundi	39.79	
134	Aminath Inas Ismail	Maldives	40.75	
135	Daoheuang Inthavong	Laos	43.28	
136	Ingrid Rabienne Outtara	Burkina Faso	44.09	
--	Gloria Koussihouede	Benin	DNS	
--	Soraya Abdourahmane	Mauritania	DNS	
--	Ana Roxiero	Angola	DNS	
--	Chanelle Van Wyk	South Africa	DNS	
--	Martina Moravcová	Slovakia	DNS	
--	Anisa Curraj	Albania	DQ	
--	Zhu Yingwen	China	DQ	
