= Swimming at the 2007 World Aquatics Championships – Women's 100 metre freestyle =

The women's 100 metre freestyle competition at the 2007 World Aquatics Championships was held on 29 and 30 March 2007 at the Rod Laver Arena in Melbourne, Australia. 135 swimmers were entered in the event.

== Records ==
Prior to the competition, the existing world and championship records were as follows.

World record	Britta Steffen (GER)	53.30	Budapest, Hungary	2 August 2006
Competition record	Le Jingyi (CHN)	54.01	Rome, Italy	5 September 1994

The following records were established during the competition:

Date	Round	Name	Nationality	Time	Record
25 March	Final*	Libby Lenton	Australia	53.42	CR
29 March	Semifinal 2	Natalie Coughlin	United States	53.40	CR
30 March	Final	Libby Lenton	Australia	53.40	=CR

* Split from the women's 4 × 100 m freestyle relay

== Finals ==
Place	Lane	Name	Nationality	Split (50m)	Time	Note
	5	Lisbeth Lenton	Australia	25.38	53.40	CR
	2	Marleen Veldhuis	Netherlands	25.15	53.70	
	3	Britta Steffen	Germany	25.76	53.74	
4	4	Natalie Coughlin	United States	25.56	53.87	
5	6	Erica Morningstar	Canada	25.84	54.10	
6	7	Jodie Henry	Australia	26.07	54.21	
7	8	Josefin Lillhage	Sweden	26.25	54.67	
8	1	Malia Metella	France	25.84	54.77	

== Semifinals ==
Rank	Heat (Lane)	Name	Nationality	50m	Time	Notes
1	2 (4)	Natalie Coughlin	USA	25.67	53.40	Q CR, AM
2	2 (5)	Lisbeth Lenton	Australia	25.55	53.85	Q
3	1 (5)	Britta Steffen	Germany	25.77	54.05	Q
4	1 (4)	Erica Morningstar	Canada	25.98	54.08	Q
5	1 (6)	Marleen Veldhuis	Netherlands	25.81	54.17	Q
6	1 (3)	Jodie Henry	Australia	26.32	54.23	Q
7	1 (1)	Malia Metella	France	26.26	54.61	Q
7	2 (3)	Josefin Lillhage	Sweden	26.25	54.61	Q
9	2 (6)	Francesca Halsall	Great Britain	25.98	54.85	
10	1 (2)	Alena Popchanka	France	26.61	54.99	
11	2 (7)	Xu Yanwei	China	26.20	55.10	
12	1 (7)	Hanna-Maria Seppälä	Finland	26.16	55.31	
13	2 (1)	Ranomi Kromowidjojo	Netherlands	26.68	55.33	
14	2 (8)	Aleksandra Gerasimenya	Belarus	26.10	55.39	
15	2 (2)	Amanda Weir	USA	26.39	55.47	
16	1 (8)	Vanessa García	Puerto Rico	26.25	56.27	

== Preliminaries ==
Rank	Heat (Lane)	Name	Nationality	50m	Time	Q
1	16 (5)	Natalie Coughlin	USA	25.91	54.04	Q
2	16 (7)	Erica Morningstar	Canada	26.24	54.30	Q
3	16 (4)	Lisbeth Lenton	Australia	25.96	54.32	Q
4	17 (4)	Britta Steffen	Germany	26.37	54.60	Q
5	15 (2)	Josefin Lillhage	Sweden	26.44	54.74	Q
6	17 (5)	Jodie Henry	Australia	26.60	54.76	Q
7	17 (6)	Fran Halsall	Great Britain	26.29	54.80	Q
8	15 (5)	Marleen Veldhuis	Netherlands	25.84	54.89	Q
9	15 (4)	Amanda Weir	USA	26.37	55.03	Q
10	16 (3)	Alena Popchanka	France	26.52	55.11	Q
11	15 (6)	Xu Yanwei	China	26.47	55.24	Q
12	17 (2)	Hanna-Maria Seppälä	Finland	26.56	55.33	Q
13	14 (7)	Ranomi Kromowidjojo	Netherlands	26.47	55.38	Q
14	16 (2)	Malia Metella	France	26.71	55.57	Q
15	15 (7)	Aleksandra Gerasimenya	Belarus	26.43	55.59	Q
16	17 (1)	Vanessa García	Puerto Rico	26.31	55.69	Q
17	12 (4)	Jeanette Ottesen	Denmark	26.78	55.99	
18	16 (6)	Pang Jiaying	China	26.83	56.03	
18	17 (8)	Lauren Boyle	New Zealand	27.19	56.03	
20	12 (6)	Ragnheidur Ragnarsdottir	Iceland	26.80	56.06	
21	13 (1)	Jana Myskova	Czech Republic	27.36	56.24	
22	16 (8)	Victoria Poon	Canada	26.61	56.30	
23	13 (3)	Arlene Semeco	Venezuela	26.75	56.35	
24	14 (6)	Keo Ra Lee	South Korea	27.66	56.44	
25	13 (4)	Sviatlana Khakhlova	Belarus	26.49	56.52	
25	15 (3)	Martina Moravcová	Slovakia	27.10	56.52	
27	11 (3)	Ganna Dzerkal	Ukraine	26.95	56.53	
28	17 (7)	Cristina Chiuso	Italy	26.84	56.56	
29	15 (8)	Magdalena Kuras	Sweden	26.81	56.58	
30	13 (5)	Jana Kolukanova	Estonia	26.94	56.67	
31	12 (3)	Birgit Koschischek	Austria	27.23	56.75	
32	12 (1)	Elina Partõka	Estonia	27.60	56.90	
32	14 (5)	Flávia Delaroli	Brazil	26.63	56.90	
34	10 (8)	Karin Prinsloo	South Africa	27.54	57.06	
35	14 (8)	Hannah Wilson	Hong Kong	27.44	57.08	
36	12 (7)	Miroslava Najdanovski	Serbia	26.83	57.11	
36	16 (1)	Ionela Cozma	Romania	27.23	57.11	
38	14 (2)	Jorina Aerents	Belgium	27.48	57.18	
39	13 (7)	Haruka Ueda	Japan	27.97	57.21	
40	14 (3)	Petra Klosova	Czech Republic	27.55	57.28	
41	12 (2)	Oxana Serikova	Ukraine	27.04	57.29	
42	13 (2)	Chin Kuei Yang	Chinese Taipei	27.51	57.30	
43	12 (5)	Olga Shulgina	Russia	27.62	57.48	
44	10 (5)	Melanie Nocher	Ireland	27.90	57.72	
45	11 (6)	Caroline Pickering Puamau	Fiji	27.83	57.85	
45	14 (4)	Emily Vavourakis	Belgium	27.69	57.85	
47	13 (8)	Pin Chieh Nieh	Chinese Taipei	28.23	57.93	
48	8 (1)	Heather Brand	Zimbabwe	27.84	57.95	
49	12 (8)	Jiratida Phinyosophon	Thailand	28.10	58.03	
50	11 (5)	Sarah Yasmine Chahed	Tunisia	27.74	58.07	
51	11 (8)	Loren Bahamonde	Ecuador	28.32	58.21	
52	11 (4)	Hang Yu Sze	Hong Kong	27.67	58.25	
53	9 (4)	Madeleine Scerri	Malta	28.77	58.47	
54	9 (3)	Carolina Colorado Henao	Colombia	27.92	58.60	
55	14 (1)	Heysi Villarreal Navarro	Cuba	28.04	58.61	
56	9 (6)	Natasha Moodie	Jamaica	28.38	58.65	
57	11 (7)	Anna Stylianou	Cyprus	28.05	58.78	
58	10 (6)	Alexia Pamela Benitez Quijada	El Salvador	28.48	58.84	
59	10 (2)	Charlotte Johannsen	Denmark	28.30	58.85	
60	10 (7)	Mylene Ong	Singapore	28.50	59.01	
61	10 (3)	Ximena Vilar	Venezuela	27.98	59.10	
62	10 (4)	Nicole Marmol Gilbert	Ecuador	28.08	59.25	
63	11 (1)	Pannika Prachgosin	Thailand	28.72	59.48	
64	7 (1)	Sharntelle McLean	Trinidad and Tobago	28.43	59.51	
65	11 (2)	Cecilia Elizabeth Biagioli	Argentina	28.52	59.52	
66	10 (1)	Shu Yong Ho	Singapore	28.57	59.55	
67	8 (3)	Anna-Liza Mopio-Jane	Papua New Guinea	28.15	59.84	
68	9 (7)	Irina Shlemova	Uzbekistan	28.55	59.90	
69	9 (1)	Raffaella Rodoni Palma	Chile	29.17	1:00.08	
70	8 (5)	Kimberly Eeson	Zimbabwe	28.71	1:00.09	
70	8 (8)	Ellen Hight	Zambia	28.79	1:00.09	
72	7 (5)	Marianella Quesada Barrantes	Costa Rica	28.87	1:00.10	
73	6 (5)	Felicia Leksono	Indonesia	28.37	1:00.49	
74	8 (4)	Cheok Mei Ma	Macau	28.73	1:00.52	
75	7 (8)	Marie Laura Meza Peraza	Costa Rica	29.23	1:00.69	
76	7 (6)	Elena Popovska	Macedonia	29.36	1:00.73	
77	8 (6)	Nancy Suryaatmadja	Indonesia	28.87	1:00.80	
78	9 (5)	Khadija Ciss	Senegal	29.15	1:01.05	
79	3 (6)	Kshipra Mahajan	India	29.37	1:01.51	
80	6 (1)	Ximene Vaz Gomez	Mozambique	29.63	1:01.55	
80	6 (8)	Davina Mangion	Malta	30.16	1:01.55	
82	6 (2)	Tuesday Watts	Grenada	29.22	1:01.60	
83	4 (8)	Jessica Teixeira Vieira	Mozambique	29.44	1:01.78	
84	7 (4)	Ngozi Monu	Nigeria	29.14	1:01.88	
85	5 (3)	Emma Hunter	Samoa	29.42	1:01.89	
86	6 (7)	Jonay Briedenhann	Namibia	29.77	1:02.04	
87	6 (4)	Maria Alejandra Torres	Peru	29.74	1:02.17	
88	6 (6)	Nilshaira Isenia	Netherlands Antilles	29.33	1:02.18	
89	5 (2)	Parita Parekh	India	29.33	1:02.27	
90	8 (2)	Miriam Hatamleh	Jordan	29.99	1:02.29	
91	8 (7)	Rachel Ah Koy	Fiji	29.87	1:02.41	
92	7 (2)	Fiorella Gomez−Sanchez	Peru	30.20	1:02.52	
93	5 (5)	Tojohanitra; Andriamanjatoprimamama	Madagascar	29.45	1:02.60	
94	5 (4)	Nicole Ellsworth	Papua New Guinea	30.14	1:02.89	
95	6 (3)	Matana Wellman	Zambia	29.31	1:02.99	
96	4 (1)	Mona Simonsen	Faroe Islands	30.56	1:03.01	
97	3 (5)	Dashtserengiin Saintsetseg	Mongolia	30.15	1:03.04	
98	4 (4)	Shannon Austin	Seychelles	30.51	1:03.09	
99	5 (6)	Marike Meyer	Namibia	30.58	1:03.46	
100	7 (3)	Sook Fun Chai	Malaysia	30.50	1:03.69	
101	5 (1)	Rovena Marku	Albania	30.36	1:03.72	
102	4 (2)	Dalia Massiel Torrez Zamora	Nicaragua	30.31	1:03.84	
103	4 (7)	Karen Torrez	Bolivia	30.72	1:04.04	
104	7 (7)	Razan Taha	Jordan	30.20	1:04.06	
105	3 (4)	Binta Zahra Diop	Senegal	30.88	1:04.09	
106	4 (5)	Ekaterina Mamatkulova	Uzbekistan	30.21	1:04.17	
107	4 (6)	Dohi Eliane Droubry	Ivory Coast	30.19	1:04.47	
108	2 (4)	Kiran Khan	Pakistan	30.39	1:04.69	
109	2 (5)	Rachel Lannen	Guam	30.67	1:05.23	
110	5 (8)	Uche Monu	Nigeria	31.47	1:05.34	
111	4 (3)	Anouchka Diane Etiennette	Mauritius	31.01	1:05.65	
112	5 (7)	Prisca Rose	Mauritius	31.38	1:05.70	
113	3 (1)	Stephanie Anne Maitland	Seychelles	30.59	1:06.12	
114	3 (8)	Batjargalyn Telmen	Mongolia	31.83	1:06.28	
115	2 (7)	Sarah Elizabeth Johnson	Northern Mariana Islands	31.91	1:06.56	
116	2 (2)	Pina Ercolano	Kenya	31.80	1:06.58	
117	3 (3)	Herinantenaina; Ravoajanahary	Madagascar	31.79	1:06.90	
118	2 (6)	Hussain Aminath Rouya	Maldives	31.73	1:07.11	
119	2 (8)	April Chang	Samoa	31.97	1:07.61	
120	3 (2)	Sameera Albitar	Brunei	31.67	1:09.07	
121	1 (4)	Olivia Aya Nakitanda	Uganda	33.19	1:09.76	
122	2 (1)	Julianne Kirchner	Marshall Islands	32.98	1:10.62	
123	1 (3)	Amber Sikosang Yobech	Palau	33.53	1:10.65	
124	1 (2)	Maria Gibbons	Palau	34.80	1:14.76	
125	1 (1)	Ruth Magdalena Moshi	Tanzania	35.01	1:15.87	
126	1 (5)	Olga Hachatryan	Turkmenistan	34.01	1:16.91	
127	1 (7)	Aminath Inas Ismail	Maldives	38.33	1:22.74	
128	2 (3)	Nahed Akhlif	Libya	37.48	1:25.88	
	1 (6)	Katerina Izmailova	Tajikistan	DNS		
	3 (7)	Ana Roxiero	Angola	DNS		
	9 (2)	Chanelle van Wyk	South Africa	DNS		
	13 (6)	Maria Fuster Martinez	Spain	DNS		
	15 (1)	Soraya Abdourahmane	Mauritania	DNS		
	17 (3)	Petra Dallmann	Germany	DNS		
	9 (8)	Sharon Paola Fajardo Sierra	Honduras	DSQ		
