= Swimming at the 2007 World Aquatics Championships – Women's 50 metre butterfly =

The Women's 50m Butterfly at the 2007 World Aquatics Championships took place on 30 March (prelims & semifinals) and the evening of 31 March (finals) at the Rod Laver Arena in Melbourne, Australia. 99 swimmers were entered in the event, of whom 93 swam.

Existing records at the start of the event were:

- World Record (WR): 25.57, Anna-Karin Kammerling (Sweden), 30 July 2002 in Berlin, Germany.
- Championship Record (CR): 25.84, Inge de Bruijn (Netherlands), Barcelona 2003 (26 July 2003)

== Results ==
=== Finals ===
Place	Name	Nationality	Time	Note
1st	Therese Alshammar	Sweden	25.91	
2nd	Danni Miatke	Australia	26.05	
3rd	Inge Dekker	Netherlands	26.11	
4th	Anna-Karin Kammerling	Sweden	26.32	
5th	Rachel Komisarz	USA	26.41	
6th	Fabienne Nadarajah	Austria	26.77	
7th	Tao Li	Singapore	26.80	
8th	Zhou Yafei	China	27.06	

=== Semifinals ===
Rank	Swimmer	Nation	Time	Note
1	Therese Alshammar	Sweden	25.82	Q, CR
2	Inge Dekker	Netherlands	26.20	Q
3	Rachel Komisarz	USA	26.48	Q
4	Danni Miatke	Australia	26.57	Q
5	Zhou Yafei	China	26.69	Q
6	Anna-Karin Kammerling	Sweden	26.81	Q
7	Tao Li	Singapore	26.82	Q
8	Fabienne Nadarajah	Austria	26.86	Q
9	Antje Buschschulte	Germany	26.89	
10	Yuka Kato	Japan	26.91	
11	Jeanette Ottesen	Denmark	26.95	
12	Kim Vandenberg	USA	26.99	
13	Chantal Groot	Netherlands	27.10	
14	Ayako Doi	Japan	27.12	
15	Irina Bespalova	Russia	27.17	
16	Kimberly Buys	Belgium	27.27	

=== Preliminaries ===
Rank	Swimmer	Nation	Time	Note
1	Danni Miatke	Australia	26.34	Q
2	Rachel Komisarz	USA	26.58	Q
3	Inge Dekker	Netherlands	26.60	Q
4	Zhou Yafei	China	26.67	Q
5	Anna-Karin Kammerling	Sweden	26.81	Q
5	Jeanette Ottesen	Denmark	26.81	Q
7	Fabienne Nadarajah	Austria	26.99	Q
8	Chantal Groot	Netherlands	27.13	Q
9	Ayako Doi	Japan	27.15	Q
10	Tao Li	Singapore	27.17	Q
10	Yuka Kato	Japan	27.17	Q
10	Kimberly Buys	Belgium	27.17	Q
13	Therese Alshammar	Sweden	27.26	Q
14	Irina Bespalova	Russia	27.27	Q
15	Kim Vandenberg	USA	27.30	Q
16	Antje Buschschulte	Germany	27.31	Q
17	Elena Gemo	Italy	27.35	
18	Lisbeth Lenton	Australia	27.36	
19	Keri-Leigh Shaw	South Africa	27.46	
19	Daniela Samulski	Germany	27.46	
21	Triin Aljand	Estonia	27.60	
22	Audrey Lacroix	Canada	27.73	
23	Natalya Sutyagina	Russia	27.77	
24	Marilies Demal	Austria	27.83	
24	Aleksandra Urbanczyk	Poland	27.83	
26	Aurore Mongel	France	27.87	
26	Martina Moravcová	Slovakia	27.87	
28	Camille Muffat	France	27.92	
29	Zoë Baker	New Zealand	27.95	
30	Rosalind Brett	Great Britain	28.02	
31	Amit Ivry	Israel	28.10	
32	Sara Oliveira	Portugal	28.12	
33	Hang Yu Sze	Hong Kong	28.15	
34	Carolina Colorado Henao	Colombia	28.20	
35	Heather Brand	Zimbabwe	28.23	
36	Denisa Smolenova	Slovakia	28.25	
37	Liz Coster	New Zealand	28.30	
38	Micha Jensen	Denmark	28.40	
39	Hannah Wilson	Hong Kong	28.46	
40	Hae In Shin	South Korea	28.50	
41	Sharntelle McLean	Trinidad and Tobago	28.64	
42	Iris Rosenberger	Turkey	28.65	
43	Geneviève Saumur	Canada	28.81	
44	Loren Bahamonde	Ecuador	28.98	
45	Caroline Pickering	Fiji	29.11	
46	Chin Kuel Yang	Chinese Taipei	29.11	
47	You Ri Kown	South Korea	29.16	
47	Ellen Hight	Zambia	29.16	
49	Cheok Mei Ma	Macao	29.45	
50	Maria Rodriguez	Venezuela	29.53	
51	Irina Shlemova	Uzbekistan	29.63	
52	Mylene Ong	Singapore	29.64	
53	Galina Dukhanova	Uzbekistan	30.02	
54	Emma Hunter	Samoa	30.19	
54	Tojohanitra; Andriamanjatoprimamama	Madagascar	30.19	
56	Marianella Quesada Barrantes	Costa Rica	30.33	
57	Binta Zahra Diop	Senegal	30.37	
58	Ileana Murillo Argueta	El Salvador	30.50	
59	Sharon Paola Fajardo Sierra	Honduras	30.52	
60	Monika Spasova	Macedonia	30.61	
61	Natasha Moodie	Jamaica	30.74	
62	Davina Mangion	Malta	30.77	
63	Rachel Ah Koy	Fiji	30.79	
63	Razan Taha	Jordan	30.79	
65	Elena Popovska	Macedonia	30.82	
66	Jonay Briedenhann	Namibia	30.91	
67	Marie Laura Meza Peraza	Costa Rica	30.96	
68	Dalia Massiel Torrez Zamora	Nicaragua	31.07	
69	Thi Hanh Phan	Vietnam	31.12	
69	Jessica Teixeira Vieira	Mozambique	31.12	
71	Karen Torrez	Bolivia	31.14	
72	Sara Elbekri	Morocco	31.52	
72	Miriam Hatamleh	Jordan	31.52	
74	Kiran Khan	Pakistan	31.56	
75	Prisca Rose	Mauritius	31.63	
76	Parita Parekh	India	32.07	
77	Nicole Ellsworth	Papua New Guinea	32.20	
78	Ximene Vaz Gomez	Mozambique	32.54	
79	Mercedes Milner	Zambia	32.55	
80	Kathryn Millin	Swaziland	32.57	
81	Kelly How Tam Fat	Mauritius	33.42	
82	Judith Meauri	Papua New Guinea	33.61	
83	Hussain Aminath Rouya	Maldives	33.78	
84	Virginia Farmer	American Samoa	33.80	
85	Shannon Austin	Seychelles	33.98	
86	Debra Daniel	(Federated States of Micronesia) FS Micronesia	34.00	
87	Saintsetseg Dashtseren	Mongolia	34.04	
88	Chinyere Pigot	Suriname	35.02	
89	Samantha La Qua	Grenada	35.13	
90	Zakia Nassar	Palestine	35.88	
91	Senele Dlamini	Swaziland	36.14	
92	Julianne Kirchner	Marshall Islands	37.71	
93	Teran Matthews	(Saint Vincent and the Grenadines) Saint Vincent and the Grenadines	41.83	
--	Katerina Izmailova	Tajikistan	DNS	
--	Ngozi Monu	Nigeria	DNS	
--	Ana Roxiero	Angola	DNS	
--	Chantal Van Wyk	South Africa	DNS	
--	XU Yanwei	China	DNS	
--	Ira Kurniawan	Indonesia	DQ	

== See also ==
- Swimming at the 2005 World Aquatics Championships – Women's 50 metre butterfly
- Swimming at the 2009 World Aquatics Championships – Women's 50 metre butterfly
