= Swimming at the 2008 Summer Olympics – Women's 50 metre freestyle =

Women's 50 metre freestyle at the Games of the XXIX Olympiad
- Venue: Beijing National Aquatics Center
- Date: August 15, 2008 (heats); August 16, 2008(semifinals); August 17, 2008 (final)
- Competitors: 92 from 83 nations
- Winning time: 24.06 OR

Medalists
1st place, gold medalist(s)		Britta Steffen	Germany
2nd place, silver medalist(s)		Dara Torres	United States
3rd place, bronze medalist(s)		Cate Campbell	Australia

The women's 50 metre freestyle event at the 2008 Olympic Games took place on 15–17 August at the Beijing National Aquatics Center in Beijing, China.

Germany's Britta Steffen blasted a new Olympic record to strike a sprint freestyle double. She posted a time of 24.06, the second-fastest ever in the event, to erase Inge de Bruijn's 2000 record, and to hold off U.S. swimmer Dara Torres in a close race by a hundredth of a second (0.01). Returning from an eight-year absence, aged 41, Torres became the oldest swimmer to win a medal in Olympic history, surpassing British swimmer William Robinson, who was 38 at the time of the 1908 Summer Olympics. She established both a personal best and an American record of 24.07 to earn a silver medal and eleventh overall in her fifth Olympics since 1984. Meanwhile, Australian teenager Cate Campbell picked up a bronze in 24.17, edging out her teammate Lisbeth Trickett (24.25) by 0.08 of a second.

Netherlands' Marleen Veldhuis finished fifth with a time of 24.26, and was followed in the sixth spot by American Kara Lynn Joyce in 24.63. Veldhuis' teammate Hinkelien Schreuder (24.65) and Belarus' Aliaksandra Herasimenia (24.77) rounded out the finale.

Notable swimmers missed out the top 8 final, featuring Sweden's Therese Alshammar, four-time Olympian and silver medalist in Sydney eight years earlier, and Finland's Hanna-Maria Seppälä, fourth-place finalist in the 100 m freestyle.

== Records ==
Prior to this competition, the existing world and Olympic records were as follows.

World record	Lisbeth Trickett (AUS)	23.97	Sydney, Australia	29 March 2008	
Olympic record	Inge de Bruijn (NED)	24.13	Sydney, Australia	22 September 2000	-

The following new world and Olympic records were set during this competition.

Date	Event	Name	Nationality	Time	Record
August 17	Final	Britta Steffen	Germany	24.06	OR

== Results ==
=== Heats ===
Rank	Heat	Lane	Name	Nationality	Time	Notes
1	10	4	Cate Campbell	Australia	24.20	Q
2	11	4	Marleen Veldhuis	Netherlands	24.38	Q
3	10	5	Dara Torres	United States	24.58	Q
4	12	4	Lisbeth Trickett	Australia	24.67	Q
5	11	6	Jeanette Ottesen	Denmark	24.83	Q
6	12	5	Britta Steffen	Germany	24.90	Q
7	12	2	Zhu Yingwen	China	24.91	Q
8	10	3	Francesca Halsall	Great Britain	24.93	Q
9	11	5	Therese Alshammar	Sweden	24.94	Q
10	12	6	Malia Metella	France	24.95	Q
11	11	2	Arlene Semeco	Venezuela	24.98	Q, NR
12	11	3	Hinkelien Schreuder	Netherlands	25.00	Q
12	11	8	Li Zhesi	China	25.00	Q
14	12	3	Kara Lynn Joyce	United States	25.01	Q
15	12	1	Hanna-Maria Seppälä	Finland	25.06	Q, NR
16	10	6	Aliaksandra Herasimenia	Belarus	25.07	Q
17	12	7	Agata Ewa Korc	Poland	25.14	NR
18	11	1	Céline Couderc	France	25.22	
19	8	7	Anna Gostomelsky	Israel	25.23	NR
20	12	8	Sviatlana Khakhlova	Belarus	25.27	
21	9	5	Triin Aljand	Estonia	25.29	
22	10	2	Anna-Karin Kammerling	Sweden	25.34	
22	10	7	Flavia Cazziolato	Brazil	25.34	
24	8	2	Arianna Vanderpool-Wallace	Bahamas	25.40	
25	10	1	Petra Dallmann	Germany	25.43	
26	11	7	Lize-Mari Retief	South Africa	25.44	
27	9	4	Martina Moravcová	Slovakia	25.47	
28	9	7	Anastasia Aksenova	Russia	25.51	
29	8	5	Sandra Kazíková	Czech Republic	25.54	
30	9	6	Victoria Poon	Canada	25.58	
31	9	8	Chang Hee-jin	South Korea	25.59	
32	9	2	Oksana Serikova	Ukraine	25.65	
33	9	1	Martha Matsa	Greece	25.68	
34	10	8	Cristina Chiuso	Italy	25.74	
35	9	3	Vanessa García	Puerto Rico	25.81	
36	8	3	Ragnheidur Ragnarsdottir	Iceland	25.82	
37	8	1	Natasha Moodie	Jamaica	25.95	
38	7	1	Carolina Colorado Henao	Colombia	26.11	
39	6	6	Rugilė Mileišytė	Lithuania	26.19	
39	7	2	Sharntelle McLean	Trinidad and Tobago	26.19	
41	7	5	Eva Dobar	Hungary	26.33	
42	6	2	Anna-Liza Mopio-Jane	Papua New Guinea	26.47	
43	7	3	Nina Sovinek	Slovenia	26.49	
44	6	3	Yamile Bahamonde	Ecuador	26.54	
44	7	6	Yu Ning Elaine Chan	Hong Kong	26.54	
46	7	8	Marina Mulyayeva	Kazakhstan	26.57	
47	6	5	Christel Simms	Philippines	26.64	
48	8	8	Leung Chii Lin	Malaysia	26.75	
49	7	4	Monika Babok	Croatia	26.84	
50	6	4	Veronica Vdovicenco	Moldova	26.92	
51	5	4	Sharon Paola Fajardo Sierra	Honduras	27.19	
52	6	7	Ngozi Monu	Nigeria	27.39	
53	6	1	Ellen Lendra Hight	Zambia	27.42	
54	5	5	Chinyere Pigot	Suriname	27.66	
55	5	7	Dalia Tórrez Zamora	Nicaragua	27.81	
56	5	3	Razan Taha	Jordan	27.82	
57	6	8	Marianela Quesada	Costa Rica	28.11	
58	4	4	Ximene Gomes	Mozambique	28.15	
58	5	2	Rovena Marku	Albania	28.15	NR
60	5	6	Tojohanitra Andriamanjatoarimanana	Madagascar	28.54	
61	4	8	Senele Dlamini	Swaziland	28.70	
62	4	1	Virginia Farmer	American Samoa	28.82	
63	5	1	Diane Etiennette	Mauritius	28.83	
64	4	3	Katerine Moreno	Bolivia	29.05	
65	5	8	Ana Crysna da Silva Romero	Angola	29.06	
66	3	5	Olivia Aya Nakitanda	Uganda	29.38	
67	4	2	Dashtserengiin Saintsetseg	Mongolia	29.63	
68	7	7	Mariya Bugakova	Uzbekistan	29.73	
69	4	5	Kiran Khan	Pakistan	29.84	
70	3	4	Samantha Paxinos	Botswana	29.91	
71	3	8	Amber Yobech	Palau	30.00	
72	4	6	Aminath Rouya Hussain	Maldives	30.21	
73	4	7	Doli Akhter	Bangladesh	30.23	
74	1	5	Sameera Al Bitar	Bahrain	30.32	
75	3	6	Julianne Kirchner	Marshall Islands	30.42	
76	3	7	Debra Daniel	Federated States of Micronesia	30.61	
77	3	2	Magdalena Moshi	Tanzania	31.37	
78	3	1	Hemthon Vitiny	Cambodia	31.41	
79	2	7	Zakiya Nassar	Palestine	31.97	
80	3	3	Katerina Izmaylova	Tajikistan	32.09	
81	2	5	Karishma Karki	Nepal	32.35	
82	2	4	Zahra Pinto	Malawi	32.53	
83	2	6	Antoinette Guedia Mouafo	Cameroon	33.59	
84	2	3	Vilayphone Vongphachanh	Laos	34.79	
85	2	2	Elisabeth Nikiema	Burkina Faso	34.98	NR
86	2	8	Elsie Uwamahoro	Burundi	36.86	
87	1	6	Gloria Koussihouede	Benin	37.09	
88	1	3	Pamela Girimbabazi	Rwanda	39.78	
89	1	4	Djene Barry	Guinea	39.80	
90	2	1	Mariama Souley Bana	Niger	40.83	
	8	4	Miroslava Najdanovski	Serbia	DNS	
	8	6	Bayan Jumah	Syria	DNS	

=== Semifinals ===
==== Semifinal 1 ====
Rank	Lane	Name	Nationality	Time	Notes
1	3	Britta Steffen	Germany	24.43	Q
2	4	Marleen Veldhuis	Netherlands	24.46	Q
3	5	Lisbeth Trickett	Australia	24.47	Q
4	7	Hinkelien Schreuder	Netherlands	24.52	Q
5	1	Kara Lynn Joyce	United States	24.63	Q
6	8	Aliaksandra Herasimenia	Belarus	24.72	Q
7	6	Francesca Halsall	Great Britain	24.80	
8	2	Malia Metella	France	24.89	

==== Semifinal 2 ====
Rank	Lane	Name	Nationality	Time	Notes
1	5	Dara Torres	United States	24.27	Q
2	4	Cate Campbell	Australia	24.42	Q
3	6	Zhu Yingwen	China	24.76	
4	3	Jeanette Ottesen	Denmark	24.86	
5	1	Li Zhesi	China	24.90	
6	2	Therese Alshammar	Sweden	24.96	
7	7	Arlene Semeco	Venezuela	25.05	
8	8	Hanna-Maria Seppälä	Finland	25.19	

=== Final ===
Rank	Lane	Name	Nationality	Time	Notes
1st place, gold medalist(s)	3	Britta Steffen	Germany	24.06	OR
2nd place, silver medalist(s)	4	Dara Torres	United States	24.07	AM
3rd place, bronze medalist(s)	5	Cate Campbell	Australia	24.17	
4	2	Lisbeth Trickett	Australia	24.25	
5	6	Marleen Veldhuis	Netherlands	24.26	
6	1	Kara Lynn Joyce	United States	24.63	
7	7	Hinkelien Schreuder	Netherlands	24.65	
8	8	Aliaksandra Herasimenia	Belarus	24.77	
