= Swimming at the 2009 World Aquatics Championships – Women's 50 metre butterfly =

The heats for the women's 50 m butterfly race at the 2009 World Championships took place in the morning and evening of 31 July, with the final in the evening session of 1 August at the Foro Italico in Rome, Italy.

== Records ==
Prior to this competition, the existing world and competition records were as follows:

World record	Marleen Veldhuis (NED)	25.33	Amsterdam, Netherlands	19 April 2009
Championship record	Therese Alshammar (SWE)	25.82	Melbourne, Australia	30 March 2007

The following records were established during the competition:

Date	Round	Name	Nationality	Time	Record
31 July	Heat 10	Sarah Sjöström	Sweden	25.74	CR
31 July	Heat 13	Therese Alshammar	Sweden	25.44	CR
31 July	Semifinal 1	Marleen Veldhuis	Netherlands	25.28	WR
31 July	Semifinal 2	Therese Alshammar	Sweden	25.07	WR

== Results ==
=== Heats ===
Rank	Name	Nationality	Time	Heat	Lane	Notes
1	Therese Alshammar	Sweden	25.44	13	4	CR, NR
2	Marleen Veldhuis	Netherlands	25.58	14	4	
3	Ingvild Snildal	Norway	25.62	13	7	NR
4	Sarah Sjöström	Sweden	25.74	10	3	
5	Marieke Guehrer	Australia	25.83	14	5	
6	Silvia di Pietro	Italy	25.84	13	6	NR
7	Jeanette Ottesen	Denmark	25.86	14	3	NR
8	Yafei Zhou	China	26.00	14	2	AS
9	Christine Magnuson	United States	26.06	13	5	
10	Gabriella Silva	Brazil	26.07	13	2	SA
11	Daynara de Paula	Brazil	26.11	13	8	
12	Hinkelien Schreuder	Netherlands	26.21	12	5	
12	Sviatlana Khakhlova	Belarus	26.21	14	8	
14	Triin Aljand	Estonia	26.27	14	9	
15	Diane Bui Duyet	France	26.35	14	6	
16	Daniela Samulski	Germany	26.36	12	8	
17	Dara Torres	United States	26.41	12	4	
17	Libby Trickett	Australia	26.41	13	3	
19	Yuka Kato	Japan	26.46	12	1	
20	Irina Bespalova	Russia	26.49	12	2	NR
21	Jiao Liuyang	China	26.53	12	3	
22	Fabienne Nadarajah	Austria	26.55	14	7	
23	Amit Ivry	Israel	26.59	12	7	
23	Iryna Niafedava	Belarus	26.59	13	9	
25	Eszter Dara	Hungary	26.68	11	4	NR
26	Jemma Lowe	Great Britain	26.71	11	8	
26	Mélanie Henique	France	26.71	12	6	
28	Tao Li	Singapore	26.76	10	5	
29	Katharina Stiberg	Norway	26.77	12	0	
30	Micha Kathrine Østergaard Jensen	Denmark	26.79	11	3	
31	Martina Moravcová	Slovakia	26.80	12	9	
32	Cristina Maccagnola	Italy	26.82	14	1	
33	Kimberly Buys	Belgium	26.85	14	0	
34	Alana Dillette	Bahamas	27.07	13	9	NR
35	Beatrix Bordas	Hungary	27.13	13	1	
36	Yui Miyamoto	Japan	27.16	11	6	
37	Emilia Pikkarainen	Finland	27.23	11	5	
38	Ellen Gandy	Great Britain	27.28	11	2	
39	Victoria Poon	Canada	27.31	13	0	
40	Katarina Listopadova	Slovakia	27.37	10	4	
41	Jane Trepp	Estonia	27.39	10	9	
42	Anna Schoholeva	Cyprus	27.43	11	0	
43	Iris Rosenberger	Turkey	27.44	10	8	
44	Fella Bennaceur	Algeria	27.50	10	6	NR
45	Audrey Lacroix	Canada	27.52	9	5	
45	Kelly Shim Robinson	Hong Kong	27.52	9	0	
47	Linda Laihorinne	Finland	27.53	9	7	
48	Carolina Colorado Henao	Colombia	27.56	11	7	
49	Laetitia Perez	Switzerland	27.61	11	1	
50	Farida Osman	Egypt	27.78	9	3	
51	Sofija Djelic	Slovenia	27.82	9	2	
52	Kristina Tchernychev	Israel	27.88	9	6	
53	Binta Zahra Diop	Senegal	27.96	9	9	
54	Rita Medrano	Mexico	27.97	8	5	NR
55	Marellyn Lammert Liew	Malaysia	27.98	9	8	
56	Hang Yu Sze	Hong Kong	28.12	9	1	
57	Aneta Pechancova	Czech Republic	28.18	9	4	
58	Jeserick Pinto	Venezuela	28.20	10	1	
59	Klara Vaclavikova	Czech Republic	28.23	7	5	
60	Sharntelle McLean	Trinidad and Tobago	28.25	8	3	
61	Christine Mailliet	Luxembourg	28.36	8	6	
62	Grite Apanaviciute	Lithuania	28.38	10	0	
63	Mylene Ong	Singapore	28.48	8	4	
64	Marie Laura Meza	Costa Rica	28.58	7	4	NR
65	Aiste Dobrovolskaite	Lithuania	28.62	8	2	
65	Nadia Colovini	Argentina	28.62	10	2	NR
67	Monica Bernardo	Mozambique	28.88	7	3	
68	Ramond Sherazad	Morocco	29.01	7	9	NR
69	Gizem Cam	Turkey	29.16	8	7	
70	Ma Cheok Mei	Macau	29.21	8	8	
71	Achieng Ajulu-Bushell	Kenya	29.32	7	2	NR
72	Nishani Cicilson	Suriname	29.34	6	3	
73	Dalia Torrez	Nicaragua	29.35	7	7	
74	Chittaranjan Shubha	India	29.48	7	8	
75	Veronica Vdovicenco	Moldova	29.50	7	6	
76	Silvie Ketelaars	Netherlands Antilles	29.53	6	6	
77	Shaila Millum Garðarnar	Faroe Islands	29.56	6	2	NR
78	Maria Georgina Gandionco	Philippines	29.60	7	1	
79	Karen Milenka Torrez Guzman	Bolivia	29.63	6	4	
80	Razan Taha	Jordan	29.66	8	9	
81	Kimberley Eeson	Zimbabwe	29.69	5	1	
82	Laura lucia Paz Chavez	Honduras	29.72	5	8	
83	Moira Fraser	Zimbabwe	29.85	5	6	
84	Jonay Briedenhann	Namibia	29.86	6	7	NR
85	Ileana Murillo	El Salvador	30.05	8	1	
86	Marianela Quesada	Costa Rica	30.12	5	0	
87	Karrakchou Lilia	Morocco	30.13	4	5	
88	Kendese Nangle	Jamaica	30.18	6	5	
89	Davina Mangion	Malta	30.24	6	9	
90	Kathryn Millin	Eswatini	30.29	3	2	
91	Nilshaira Isenia	Netherlands Antilles	30.33	5	2	
92	Long Chi Wun	Macau	30.47	7	0	
93	Karla Toscano	Guatemala	30.50	4	5	
94	Ashley Bransford	Aruba	30.53	5	7	
95	Labake Anthonia Oriretan	Nigeria	30.63	3	7	
96	Vandita Dhariyal	India	30.65	3	6	
96	Amina Meho	Lebanon	30.65	6	1	
98	Selma Atic	Bosnia and Herzegovina	30.74	8	0	
99	Sharon Paola Fajardo Sierra	Honduras	30.79	5	5	
100	Li Chuen Cheong Estelle	Mauritius	30.97	4	4	
101	Graciela Peinado Ibanez	Bolivia	31.05	2	3	
102	Talisa Pace	Malta	31.06	6	0	
103	Stephanie Rasoamanana	Madagascar	31.30	3	4	
104	Gessica Stagno	Mozambique	31.33	3	8	
105	Pina Ercolano	Kenya	31.35	4	6	
105	Adele Rova	Fiji	31.35	4	0	
107	Sara Abdullahu	Albania	31.41	4	9	
108	Estellah Fils Rabetsara	Madagascar	31.45	4	2	
109	Noelyn Faussane	French Polynesia	31.69	3	0	
110	Cheyenne Rova	Fiji	31.79	4	1	
111	Tin Hon Ko Adeline Mei-Li	Mauritius	31.80	4	3	
112	Shannon Austin	Seychelles	31.92	2	2	
113	Miniruwani Samarakoon	Sri Lanka	32.14	3	1	
114	Danielle Bernadine Findlay	Zambia	32.17	3	3	
115	Ruth Carvalho	Angola	32.20	2	5	
115	Julia Alves	Marshall Islands	32.20	2	7	
117	Noelle Anyika Smith	Seychelles	32.34	2	8	
118	Sabine Hazboun	Palestine	32.39	2	4	
119	Maria Grace Koh	Brunei	32.59	4	8	
120	Amnahliyani Mohamad Husain	Brunei	32.65	2	1	
121	Judith Ilan Meauri	Papua New Guinea	32.82	3	9	
122	Debra Daniel	Federated States of Micronesia	32.83	2	6	
123	Debora Keci	Albania	32.92	3	5	
124	Kiran Khan	Pakistan	33.13	5	3	
125	Yara Dowani	Palestine	33.64	6	8	
126	Sausan Aishath	Maldives	33.76	1	5	
127	Mariam Foum	Tanzania	34.67	1	3	
128	Julianne Kirchner	Marshall Islands	34.96	1	2	
129	Katerina Izmailova	Tajikistan	36.63	5	4	
130	Rida Mitha	Pakistan	37.54	2	9	
131	Uwamahoro Elsie	Burundi	43.87	2	0	
132	Awa Keita	Mali	44.33	1	6	
–	Ana Euceda Gutierrez	Honduras	DNS	5	9	
–	Gantumur Oyungerel	Mongolia	DSQ	1	4	
–	Loren Yamile Bahamonde	Ecuador	DSQ	11	9	

=== Semifinals ===
Rank	Name	Nationality	Time	Heat	Lane	Notes
1	Therese Alshammar	Sweden	25.07	2	4	WR
2	Marleen Veldhuis	Netherlands	25.28	1	4	NR
3	Ingvild Snildal	Norway	25.53	2	5	NR
4	Marieke Guehrer	Australia	25.58	2	3	OC
5	Yafei Zhou	China	25.59	1	6	AS
6	Sarah Sjöström	Sweden	25.76	1	5	
7	Daynara de Paula	Brazil	25.85	2	7	SA
8	Diane Bui Duyet	France	25.87	2	8	NR
9	Jeanette Ottesen	Denmark	25.90	2	6	
10	Hinkelien Schreuder	Netherlands	25.94	1	7	
11	Silvia di Pietro	Italy	26.00	1	3	
12	Sviatlana Khakhlova	Belarus	26.00	2	1	
13	Gabriella Silva	Brazil	26.02	1	2	
14	Triin Aljand	Estonia	26.16	1	1	
15	Christine Magnuson	United States	26.21	2	2	
16	Daniela Samulski	Germany	26.33	1	8	NR

=== Final ===
Rank	Name	Nationality	Time	Lane	Notes
1st place, gold medalist(s)	Marieke Guehrer	Australia	25.48	6	OC
2nd place, silver medalist(s)	Yafei Zhou	China	25.57	2	AS
3rd place, bronze medalist(s)	Ingvild Snildal	Norway	25.58	3	
4	Therese Alshammar	Sweden	25.59	4	
5	Marleen Veldhuis	Netherlands	25.63	5	
6	Sarah Sjöström	Sweden	25.66	7	
7	Diane Bui Duyet	France	25.92	8	
8	Daynara de Paula	Brazil	26.12	1	
