= Swimming at the 2008 Summer Olympics – Women's 100 metre freestyle =

Women's 100 metre freestyle at the Games of the XXIX Olympiad
- Venue: Beijing National Aquatics Center
- Date: August 13, 2008 (heats); August 14, 2008 (semifinals); August 15, 2008 (final)
- Competitors: 49 from 41 nations
- Winning time: 53.12 OR

Medalists
1st place, gold medalist(s)		Britta Steffen	Germany
2nd place, silver medalist(s)		Lisbeth Trickett	Australia
3rd place, bronze medalist(s)		Natalie Coughlin	United States

The women's 100 metre freestyle event at the 2008 Olympic Games took place on 13–15 August at the Beijing National Aquatics Center in Beijing, China.

Germany's Britta Steffen blasted a new Olympic record to claim a gold medal in the event. Coming from eighth place in the turn, she posted a time of 53.12 to edge out Australia's world record holder and top favorite Lisbeth Trickett by 0.04 of a second. Swimming in lane eight, Trickett earned a silver with an outside record time of 53.16. She narrowly reached the final as the eighth seed, when China's Pang Jiaying was disqualified for a false start in the semifinals. Meanwhile, U.S. swimmer Natalie Coughlin powered home with a bronze in a matching American record of 53.39 for the second consecutive Olympics. It was Coughlin's fifth medal of these Games, matching her total from Athens four years earlier.

Competing at her third straight Olympics with Steffen, Finland's Hanna-Maria Seppälä finished outside the medals in fourth place at 53.97. Earlier, she posted a top-seeded time of 53.60 from the sixth heat to lead the prelims. She was followed in fifth place by Denmark's Jeanette Ottesen (54.06), and host nation China's Zhu Yingwen, who shared a sixth-place tie with the Netherlands' Marleen Veldhuis in 54.21. Great Britain's Francesca Halsall (54.29) closed out the field.

== Records ==
Prior to this competition, the existing world and Olympic records were as follows.

World record	Lisbeth Trickett (AUS)	52.88	Sydney, Australia	27 March 2008	
Olympic record	Jodie Henry (AUS)	53.52	Athens, Greece	18 August 2004	-

The following new world and Olympic records were set during this competition.

Date	Event	Name	Nationality	Time	Record
August 10	Final*	Britta Steffen	Germany	53.38	OR
August 15	Final	Britta Steffen	Germany	53.12	OR

* Split from the 4 × 100 m freestyle relay

== Results ==
=== Heats ===
Rank	Heat	Lane	Name	Nationality	Time	Notes
1	6	3	Hanna-Maria Seppälä	Finland	53.60	Q, NR
2	6	4	Britta Steffen	Germany	53.67	Q
3	6	5	Marleen Veldhuis	Netherlands	53.76	Q
4	7	5	Natalie Coughlin	United States	53.82	Q
5	5	6	Francesca Halsall	Great Britain	53.93	Q
6	7	4	Lisbeth Trickett	Australia	53.99	Q
7	6	6	Pang Jiaying	China	54.01	Q, =AS
7	7	7	Zhu Yingwen	China	54.01	Q, =AS
9	4	5	Jeanette Ottesen	Denmark	54.04	Q
10	6	2	Josefin Lillhage	Sweden	54.07	Q
11	7	3	Malia Metella	France	54.12	Q
12	5	7	Aliaksandra Herasimenia	Belarus	54.52	Q
13	5	4	Cate Campbell	Australia	54.55	Q
14	5	3	Lacey Nymeyer	United States	54.62	Q
15	7	6	Erica Morningstar	Canada	54.66	Q
16	6	7	Petra Dallmann	Germany	54.70	Q*
16	7	1	Julia Wilkinson	Canada	54.70	
18	5	2	Alena Popchanka	France	54.86	
19	7	8	Tatiana Barbosa	Brazil	55.01	
20	6	1	Agata Ewa Korc	Poland	55.14	NR
21	6	8	Lize-Mari Retief	South Africa	55.17	
22	4	3	Anna Gostomelsky	Israel	55.18	
23	5	1	Martina Moravcová	Slovakia	55.20	
24	5	5	Inge Dekker	Netherlands	55.23	
25	4	4	Anastasia Aksenova	Russia	55.29	
26	3	3	Hannah Wilson	Hong Kong	55.32	
27	4	8	Darya Stepanyuk	Ukraine	55.51	
28	3	4	Arianna Vanderpool-Wallace	Bahamas	55.61	
29	3	2	Birgit Koschischek	Austria	55.62	
30	4	2	Arlene Semeco	Venezuela	55.70	
31	5	8	Jana Klusáčková	Czech Republic	55.92	
32	3	1	Chang Hee-jin	South Korea	55.96	
33	4	7	Triin Aljand	Estonia	56.10	
34	2	5	Quah Ting Wen	Singapore	56.14	
35	3	5	Ragnheidur Ragnarsdottir	Iceland	56.35	
36	3	8	Anna Stylianou	Cyprus	56.38	
37	3	7	Eleni Kosti	Greece	56.44	
38	4	1	Miroslava Najdanovski	Serbia	56.50	
39	2	6	Natthanan Junkrajang	Thailand	56.56	
40	2	4	Orsolya Tompa	Hungary	56.57	
41	2	7	Christel Simms	Philippines	56.67	NR
42	4	6	Maria Laura Simonetto	Italy	56.72	
43	2	3	Nieh Pin-chieh	Chinese Taipei	57.28	
44	3	6	Nina Sovinek	Slovenia	57.30	
45	1	4	Madeleine Scerri	Malta	57.97	NR
46	2	2	Irina Shlemova	Uzbekistan	58.77	
47	1	5	Elena Popovska	Macedonia	59.93	
48	1	6	Olga Hachatryan	Turkmenistan	1:14.77	
	7	2	Caitlin McClatchey	Great Britain	DNS	

=== Semifinals ===
==== Semifinal 1 ====
Rank	Lane	Name	Nationality	Time	Notes
1	5	Natalie Coughlin	United States	53.70	Q
2	6	Zhu Yingwen	China	53.84	Q, AS
3	4	Britta Steffen	Germany	53.96	Q
4	3	Lisbeth Trickett	Australia	54.10	Q
5	2	Josefin Lillhage	Sweden	54.59	
6	1	Lacey Nymeyer	United States	54.74	
7	8	Petra Dallmann	Germany	55.05	
8	7	Aliaksandra Herasimenia	Belarus	55.31	

==== Semifinal 2 ====
Rank	Lane	Name	Nationality	Time	Notes
1	5	Marleen Veldhuis	Netherlands	53.81	Q
2	4	Hanna-Maria Seppälä	Finland	53.84	Q
3	3	Francesca Halsall	Great Britain	53.94	Q
4	2	Jeanette Ottesen	Denmark	54.05	Q
5	7	Malia Metella	France	54.20	
6	1	Cate Campbell	Australia	54.54	
7	8	Erica Morningstar	Canada	55.36	
	6	Pang Jiaying	China	DSQ	

Note: Lisbeth Trickett advanced to the final only when Chinese swimmer Pang Jiaying, who had finished first in the semifinals, was disqualified for a false start.

=== Final ===
Rank	Lane	Name	Nationality	Time	Notes
1st place, gold medalist(s)	7	Britta Steffen	Germany	53.12	OR
2nd place, silver medalist(s)	8	Lisbeth Trickett	Australia	53.16	
3rd place, bronze medalist(s)	4	Natalie Coughlin	United States	53.39	=AM
4	6	Hanna-Maria Seppälä	Finland	53.97	
5	1	Jeanette Ottesen	Denmark	54.06	
6	3	Zhu Yingwen	China	54.21	
6	5	Marleen Veldhuis	Netherlands	54.21	
8	2	Francesca Halsall	Great Britain	54.29	
