= Nina Sovinek =

Slovenian swimmer

Personal information
- Full name: Nina Sovinek
- National team: Slovenia
- Born: 26 May 1985 (age 41) Velenje, Socialist Republic of Slovenia, Yugoslavia
- Height: 1.76 m (5 ft 9 in)
- Weight: 65 kg (143 lb)

Sport
- Sport: Swimming
- Strokes: Freestyle
- Club: PK Olimpija
- Coach: Aleš Poljak

Nina Sovinek (born 26 May 1985) is a Slovenian swimmer, who specialized in sprint freestyle events. She represented her nation Slovenia at the 2008 Summer Olympics, and also served as a member of the Slovenian Olympic Swimming Club (Slovene: Plavalni klub Olimpija Slovenija) under head coach Aleš Poljak.

Sovinek competed for the Slovenian swimming team in a sprint freestyle double at the 2008 Summer Olympics in Beijing. Leading up to the Games, she snatched the 50 m freestyle title with a sterling 26.27 to sneak under the FINA B-cut (26.32) by 0.05 seconds at the Slovenia Open in Ljubljana, and then picked up the 100 m freestyle to her program by finishing with a thirteenth-place time in 56.11 at the European Championships in Eindhoven, Netherlands. In the 100 m freestyle, Sovinek fell short to last place in heat three and forty-third overall with a steady 57.30. Two days later, in the 50 m freestyle, Sovinek touched the wall ahead of a stiff challenge from Elaine Chan for the fourth spot in heat seven and forty-fourth overall by 0.05 of a second, finishing with a time of 26.54.
