= Papatoetoe High School =

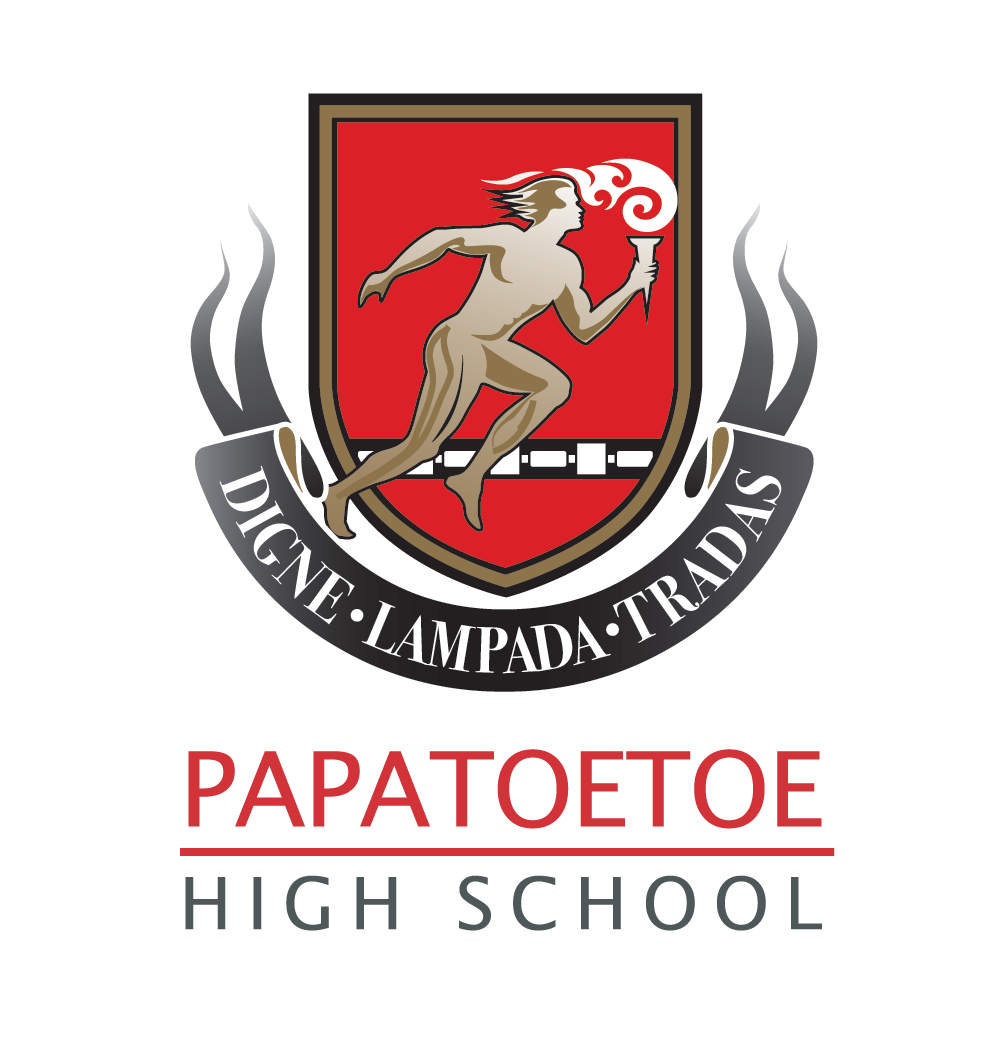

Location
- 19 Nicholson Avenue; Papatoetoe; Auckland 2025; New Zealand; 36°58′30″S 174°52′21″E

Information
- Type: State co-ed secondary (Year 9–13)
- Motto: Digne Lampada Tradas ("worthy to hand on the torch")
- Established: 1956
- Ministry of Education Institution no.: 95
- Principal: Vaughan Couillault
- Staff: 120
- Enrolment: 1,815 (July 2026)
- Socio-economic decile: 3
- Website: papatoetoehigh.school.nz

Papatoetoe High School (PHS) is a secondary school (years 9–13) in Papatoetoe suburb of Auckland, New Zealand.

== History ==
Papatoetoe High School was established in 1956.

In February 2021 during the COVID-19 pandemic in New Zealand, cases of COVID-19 associated with a family whose daughter attended Papatoetoe High School led to increased lockdowns in the Auckland Region for several weeks.

== Enrolment ==
At the September 2018 Education Review Office (ERO) review of the school, Papatoetoe High School had 1396 students enrolled. 52% of students were male and 48% were female. The prioritised ethnic composition was 37% Indian, 16% Māori, 13% Samoan, 7% Tongan, 9% South East Asian, 5% Chinese, 4% Cook Islands Maori, 3% other Pacific peoples, 3% New Zealand European, and 3% other ethnic groups.

As of July 2026, Papatoetoe High School has a roll of 1,815 students, of which 252 (13.9%) identify as Māori.

As of 2026, the school has an Equity Index of 472, placing it amongst schools whose students have above average socioeconomic barriers to achievement (roughly equivalent to deciles 4 and 5 under the former socio-economic decile system).

== Principals ==
- Colin McGill 1956–1966
- Bruce Hunter 1966–1978
- Hugh Richards 1978–1996
- Peter Gall 1996–2016
- Vaughan Couillault 2016–present

== Notable alumni ==
- Fepulea'i Margie Apa, healthcare chief executive
- Georgina Beyer, former Labour Member of Parliament
- Dillon Boucher, New Zealand's most decorated basketballer and former assistant coach of the Tall Blacks and former small forward for the New Zealand Breakers
- Charlie Faumuina, Auckland and All Blacks player
- Phil Goff, former Mayor of Auckland, former MP for Mount Roskill, former Leader of the Opposition (2008–11)
- Mark Gosche, former Labour Member of Parliament
- Ricki Herbert, former All White and former manager of All Whites and Wellington Phoenix
- Emma Hunter, Samoan New Zealander Olympic swimmer
- David Shearer (1971–75), MP for Mount Albert, humanitarian worker, Leader of the Opposition (2011–2013)
- Ish Sodhi, Northern Districts player and member of the New Zealand national cricket team
- Young Sid, real name Sidney Diamond, rapper
