= Ana Crysna da Silva Romero =

Angolan swimmer

Personal information
- Full name: Ana Crysna da Silva Romero
- National team: Angola
- Born: 4 May 1988 (age 38) Luanda, Angola
- Height: 1.66 m (5 ft 5 in)
- Weight: 59 kg (130 lb)

Sport
- Sport: Swimming
- Strokes: Freestyle
- Club: Clube Náutico de Luanda

Ana Crysna da Silva Romero (born May 4, 1988) is an Angolan swimmer, who specialized in sprint freestyle events. She represented her nation Angola at the 2008 Summer Olympics, placing herself among the top 70 swimmers in the 50 m freestyle.

Romero was invited by FINA to compete as a 20-year-old swimmer for the Angolan team in the women's 50 m freestyle at the 2008 Summer Olympics in Beijing. Swimming in heat five, she threw down an Angolan national record time and a lifetime best of 29.06 seconds to round out the field in last place. Romero, however, failed to advance into the semi-finals, as she placed sixty-fifth overall out of ninety-two swimmers in the prelims.
