= Éva Dobár =

Hungarian swimmer (born 1993)

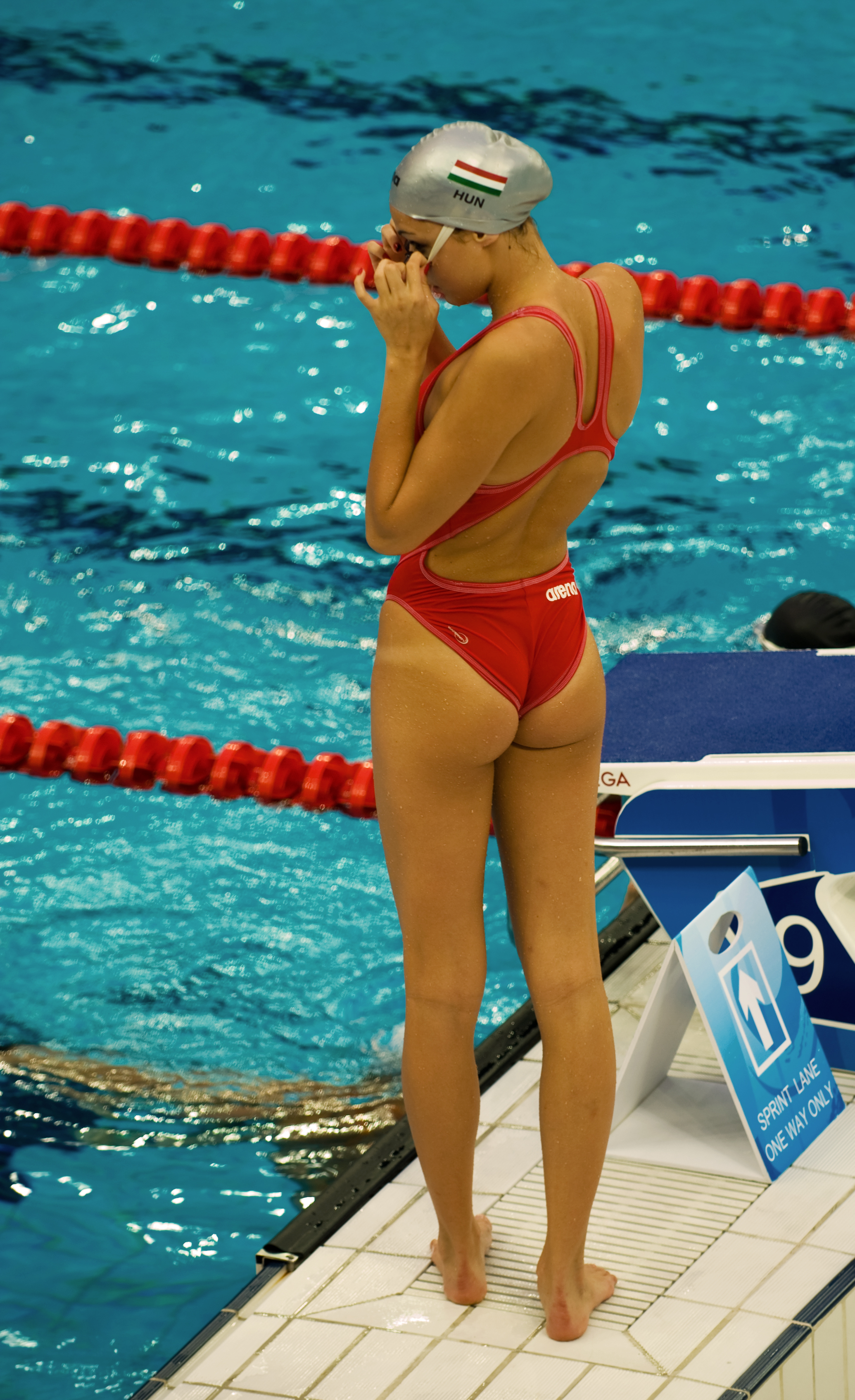

Personal information
- Full name: Éva Dobár
- Nationality: Hungary
- Born: 4 March 1993 (age 33) Miskolc, Hungary
- Height: 1.83 m (6 ft 0 in)
- Weight: 63 kg (139 lb)

Sport
- Sport: Swimming
- Strokes: Freestyle
- Club: Jövő SC
- Coach: Balázs Fehérvári

Éva Dobár (born March 4, 1993) is a Hungarian swimmer, who specialized in sprint freestyle events. Dobar represented her nation Hungary at the 2008 Summer Olympics, and also trained as a member of the swimming team at Jövő Sports Club in Miskolc, under the tutelage of personal coach Balázs Fehérvári.

Dobar competed as Hungary's youngest swimmer (aged 15) in the women's 50 m freestyle at the 2008 Summer Olympics in Beijing. Leading up to the Games, she won the race with a 26.26 to hit an insurmountable FINA B-standard (26.32) by just a 0.06 of a second at the Hungarian National Championships in Budapest. Swimming on the middle lanes in heat seven, Dobar denied her inauspicious age factor on the global scene to scorch her way to round out the top four of her heat with a time of 26.33. Dobar failed to advance into the semifinals, as she placed forty-first out of 92 swimmers in the prelims.
