= Virginia Farmer =

American Samoan swimmer (born 1975)

Personal information
- Born: October 19, 1975 (age 50) San Luis Obispo, California, USA

Sport
- Sport: Swimming

Virginia Farmer (born October 19, 1975) is an American Samoan swimmer, who specialized in sprint freestyle events. At age thirty-two, Farmer made her official debut for the 2008 Summer Olympics in Beijing, where she competed in the women's 50 m freestyle. She finished third in the fourth heat by twelve hundredths of a second (0.12) behind Swaziland's Senele Dlamini, with a time of 28.82 seconds. Farmer, however, failed to advance into the semi-finals, as she placed sixty-second out of ninety-two swimmers in the overall rankings.
