= Elisabeth Nikiema =

Burkinabé swimmer

Personal information
- Full name: Elisabeth Nikiema
- National team: Burkina Faso
- Born: 18 February 1982 (age 44) Abidjan, Ivory Coast
- Height: 1.70 m (5 ft 7 in)
- Weight: 60 kg (132 lb)

Sport
- Sport: Swimming
- Strokes: Freestyle

Elisabeth Nikiema (born February 18, 1982) is a Burkinabé swimmer, who specialized in sprint freestyle events. She has competed for her country at the 2008 Summer Olympics in Beijing, China.

== Swimming career ==
Nikiema was victorious at the Burkina Faso national swimming championships in July 2008, beating Fabienne Ouattara.

She was invited by FINA to compete as a lone female swimmer for Burkina Faso in the 50 m freestyle at the 2008 Summer Olympics in Beijing, China. Nikiema competed in the second heat of the competition, finishing in sixth place. Her time of 34.98 seconds set a new national record, having promised to beat her own record prior to the race taking place. She had finished ahead of Elsie Uwamahoro of Burundi (36.86 seconds) and Niger's Mariama Souley Bana (40.83 seconds). The heat was won by Zakia Nassar from Palestine, with a time of 31.97 seconds.
