= Veronica Vdovicenco =

Moldovan swimmer (born 1985)

Personal information
- Nationality: Moldova
- Born: 27 August 1985 (age 40) Chişinău, Moldavian SSR
- Height: 1.70 m (5 ft 7 in)
- Weight: 61 kg (134 lb)

Sport
- Sport: Swimming
- Strokes: Freestyle

Veronica Vdovicenco (born August 27, 1985) is a Moldovan swimmer, who specialized in sprint freestyle events. Vdovicenco qualified for the women's 50 m freestyle at the 2008 Summer Olympics in Beijing, by clearing a FINA B-standard entry time of 26.30 from the Belarus Championships in Minsk. She challenged seven other swimmers on the sixth heat, including returning Olympian Ellen Lendra Hight of Zambia. She raced to fifth place by 0.28 of a second behind Christel Simms of the Philippines, with a time of 26.92 seconds. Vdovicenco failed to advance into the semifinals, as she placed fiftieth out of 92 swimmers in the preliminary heats.
