= Ximene Gomes =

Mozambican swimmer (born 1989)

Personal information
- Full name: Ximene Gomes
- Nationality: Mozambique
- Born: 8 September 1989 (age 36) Maputo, Mozambique
- Height: 1.70 m (5 ft 7 in)
- Weight: 58 kg (128 lb)

Sport
- Sport: Swimming
- Strokes: Freestyle
- Club: Grupo Desportivo de Maputo

Ximene Gomes (born 8 September 1989) is a Mozambican swimmer, who specialized in sprint freestyle events. She represented her nation Mozambique at the 2008 Summer Olympics, finishing among the top 60 swimmers in the women's 50 m freestyle.

Gomes was invited by FINA to compete as a lone female Mozambican swimmer in the 50 m freestyle at the 2008 Summer Olympics in Beijing. Swimming as the fastest entrant in heat four, Gomes exploded off the blocks and came up with a magnificent effort to the top of the field in a scorching time and lifetime best of 28.15. Gomes' astonishing feat from the prelims was not enough to put her through to the semifinals, sharing a tie with Albania's Rovena Marku for the fifty-eighth overall position.
