= Diane Etiennette =

Mauritian swimmer

Personal information
- Full name: Anouchka Diane Etiennette
- National team: Mauritius
- Born: 23 April 1988 (age 38) Quatre Bornes, Mauritius
- Height: 1.75 m (5 ft 9 in)
- Weight: 65 kg (143 lb)

Sport
- Sport: Swimming
- Strokes: Freestyle
- Club: The Dolphins of Quatre Bornes

Anouchka Diane Etiennette (born April 23, 1988) is a Mauritian former swimmer, who specialized in sprint freestyle events. Etiennette started swimming at the age of seven, and made her international debut in 2003, at a local swimming tournament in Mauritius. At age sixteen, Etiennette first competed at the 2004 Summer Olympics in Athens, where she finished fifty-eighth overall in the women's 50 m freestyle with a time of 30.00 seconds. On her second Olympic appearance in Beijing 2008, Etiennette made an impressive result in the women's 50 m freestyle, and finished in the fifth heat within less than thirty seconds. However, she failed to advance into the semi-finals, placing sixty-third in the overall standings for the heats.

Etiennette is a member of The Dolphins of Quatre Bornes, a local swimming club in Mauritius.
