= Sandra Kazíková =

Czech swimmer (born 1976)

Personal information
- Full name: Sandra Kazíková
- National team: Czech Republic
- Born: 13 July 1976 (age 49) Přerov, Czechoslovakia
- Height: 1.67 m (5 ft 6 in)
- Weight: 56 kg (123 lb)

Sport
- Sport: Swimming
- Strokes: Freestyle
- Club: Slavia VŠ Plzeň
- Coach: Ivana Felgrova

Sandra Kazíková (born 13 July 1976) is a Czech former swimmer, who specialized in sprint freestyle events. She posted a long-course national record time of 25.99 seconds, by winning the 50 m freestyle at the 2008 Czech Winter Championships in Pardubice. Kazikova is also a member of the swimming team for Slavia VŠ Plzeň, and is coached and trained by Ivana Felgrova.

Kazikova made her first Czech team, as a 28-year-old, at the 2004 Summer Olympics in Athens, where she competed only in individual and relay freestyle events. She also joined with her fellow swimmers Jana Myšková, Petra Klosová, and Ilona Hlaváčková for the women's 4 × 100 m freestyle relay. Swimming the anchor leg, Kazikova recorded a split of 57.90 seconds, and the Czech team went on to finish heat one in seventh place and thirteenth overall, for a total time of 3:46.83. In the 50 m freestyle, Kazikova edged out third placer Triin Aljand by one hundredth of a second (0.01) in heat seven at 26.18 seconds. Finishing only in twenty-fifth place, Kazikova failed to qualify for the semifinals.

At the 2008 Summer Olympics in Beijing, Kazikova qualified for the second time in the women's 50 m freestyle. She cleared a FINA B-standard entry time of 25.93 seconds from the Czech Winter Championships in Prague. She challenged seven other swimmers in the eighth heat, including Bahamas' Arianna Vanderpool-Wallace, Jamaica's Natasha Moodie. Kazikova cruised to third place by 0.14 of a second behind Vanderpool-Wallace, with a time of 25.54 seconds. Kazikova, however, failed to advance into the semifinals, as she placed twenty-ninth out of 92 swimmers in the preliminaries.
