= Elena Popovska =

Macedonian swimmer (born 1990)

Personal information
- Full name: Elena Popovska
- National team: North Macedonia
- Born: 6 January 1990 (age 36) Skopje, SR Macedonia, SFR Yugoslavia
- Height: 1.74 m (5 ft 9 in)
- Weight: 63 kg (139 lb)

Sport
- Sport: Swimming
- Strokes: Freestyle
- Club: PK Skopje

Elena Popovska (Macedonian: Елена Поповска; born January 6, 1990) is a Macedonian swimmer, who specialized in sprint freestyle events. She represented the Republic of Macedonia at the 2008 Summer Olympics, placing among the top 50 swimmers in the 100 m freestyle.

Popovska was invited by FINA through the Universality rule to compete as a lone female swimmer for Macedonia in the men's 100 m freestyle at the 2008 Summer Olympics in Beijing. Swimming against fellow Olympic debutants Madeleine Scerri of Malta and Olga Hachatryan of Turkmenistan in heat one, Popovska overhauled a minute barrier with a lifetime best of 59.93 to blaze her way for the second spot and forty-seventh overall on the evening prelims, but failed to advance to the semifinals.
