= Jana Klusáčková =

Czech swimmer (born 1977)

Personal information
- Full name: Jana Myšková-Klusáčková
- National team: Czech Republic
- Born: 29 October 1977 (age 48) Pardubice, Czechoslovakia
- Height: 1.89 m (6 ft 2 in)
- Weight: 68 kg (150 lb)

Sport
- Sport: Swimming
- Strokes: Freestyle
- Club: PKHK Hradec Králové
- Coach: Martin Prokeš
Medal record
Women's swimming
Representing the Czech Republic
Universiade
Bronze medal – third place	2005 İzmir	100 m freestyle

Jana Klusáčková (née Myšková) (born 29 October 1977) is a Czech former swimmer who specialized in sprint freestyle events. She is a two-time Olympian and a multiple-time Czech champion and record holder for the freestyle events (50, 100, and 200 m). Klusáčková also won a bronze medal in the 100 m freestyle at the 2005 Summer Universiade in İzmir, Turkey, in an outstanding time of 56.40 seconds.

Klusáčková made her first Czech team at 26-years-old at the 2004 Summer Olympics in Athens, competing in both the individual and relay freestyle events. She also participated in the women's 4 × 100 m freestyle relay, along with fellow swimmers Sandra Kazíková, Petra Klosová, and Ilona Hlaváčková. Swimming the lead-off leg, Klusáčková recorded a split of 56.02 seconds, and the Czech team continued to finish heat one in seventh place, and thirteenth overall, for a total time of 3:46.83. On the third day of the competition, Klusáčková won the second heat of the 200 m freestyle by two hundredths of a second (0.02) ahead of Macedonia's Vesna Stojanovska, with a time of 2:04.62. In the 100 m freestyle, Klusáčková edged out Xu Yanwei of China by seven hundredths of a second (0.07) on the seventh heat, with a time of 56.59 seconds.

At the 2008 Summer Olympics in Beijing, Klusáčková qualified for the second time in the women's 100 m freestyle by breaking a new Czech record and clearing a FINA B-cut of 55.41 from the national championships in Prague. She challenged seven other swimmers in the fifth heat, including top favorites Cate Campbell of Australia, Francesca Halsall of Great Britain, and Aliaksandra Herasimenia of Belarus. She came in last place by 0.69 of a second behind the Netherlands' Inge Dekker, lowering her time to 55.92 seconds. Klusáčková, however, failed to advance into the semifinals, as she placed thirty-first out of 69 swimmers in the evening preliminaries.
