= Mariya Bugakova =

Uzbekistani swimmer (born 1985)

Personal information
- Full name: Mariya Grigoriyevna Bugakova
- Nickname: Masha
- National team: Uzbekistan
- Born: 6 July 1985 (age 41) Tashkent, Uzbek SSR, Soviet Union
- Height: 1.69 m (5 ft 7 in)
- Weight: 53 kg (117 lb)

Sport
- Sport: Swimming
- Strokes: Freestyle, butterfly
- Club: Uzbekistan GTK Club
- Coach: Grigoriy Bugakov; Natalya Obuhova

Mariya Bugakova (Uzbek: Мария Бугакова; born July 6, 1985) is an Uzbekistani former swimmer, who specialized in butterfly and sprint freestyle events. She represented Uzbekistan at three editions of the Olympic Games (2000, 2004, and 2008). She is also the elder sister of backstroke swimmer and two-time Olympian Danil Bugakov. Bugakova is a law school graduate at the Tashkent State University of Economics.

Bugakova started her swimming career at the very young age, and came from a sporting family, in which her parents were both trained in the pool as "working reserves" (Trudovie rezervi). At the age of fourteen, she first competed at the Asian Age Group Championships in Hong Kong, where she became a junior champion in the butterfly category. A year later, Bugakova made her Olympic debut, as one of Uzbekistan's youngest swimmers, at the 2000 Summer Olympics in Sydney. Bugakova competed in the 100 m butterfly, where she finished last in the second heat, and forty-eight overall by six tenths of a second (0.60) behind Zambia's Ellen Lendra Hight, with a time of 1:09.94. At the 2004 Summer Olympics, Bugakova edged out Saint Lucia's Natasha Sara Georgeos by less than 0.14 of a second in heat two of the 100 m butterfly, lowering her time to 1:07.08.

At the 2008 Summer Olympics in Beijing, Bugakova decided to drop her specialty event, the 100 m butterfly, and experiment with the 50 m freestyle. She achieved a FINA B-standard of 26.29 from the Russian Swimming Championships in Saint Petersburg. She challenged seven other swimmers in heat seven, including fellow three-time Olympian Marina Mulyayeva of Kazakhstan. Bugakova rounded out the field to last place by three seconds behind Croatia's Monika Babok with a time of 29.73 seconds. Bugakova failed to advance into the semifinals, as she placed sixty-eighth out of 92 swimmers in the preliminary heats.
