= Olga Hachatryan =

Turkmenistani swimmer (born 1992)

Personal information
- Full name: Olga Hachatryan
- National team: Turkmenistan
- Born: 6 July 1992 (age 34) Ashgabat, Turkmenistan
- Height: 1.63 m (5 ft 4 in)
- Weight: 63 kg (139 lb)

Sport
- Sport: Swimming
- Strokes: Freestyle

Olga Hachatryan (born July 6, 1992) is a Turkmenistani swimmer who specialized in sprint freestyle events. Hachatryan represented Turkmenistan at the 2008 Summer Olympics in Beijing, where she swam in the women's 100 m freestyle event, against Malta's Madeleine Scerri and Macedonia's Elena Popovska. She finished the race in last place for both the first heat and the overall standings, with a time of 1:14.77.
