= Senele Dlamini =

Swazi swimmer

Personal information
- Full name: Senele Dlamini
- National team: Swaziland
- Born: 1 April 1992 (age 34) Lobamba, Swaziland
- Height: 1.78 m (5 ft 10 in)
- Weight: 52 kg (115 lb)

Sport
- Sport: Swimming
- Strokes: Freestyle

Senele Dlamini (born April 1, 1992) is a Swazi swimmer, who specialized in freestyle and backstroke events. She represented her nation Swaziland at the 2008 Summer Olympics, finishing among the top 65 swimmers in the 50 m freestyle.

Dlamini received a Universality invitation from FINA to compete as a lone female swimmer for the Swaziland team in the 50 m freestyle at the 2008 Summer Olympics in Beijing. Swimming on the outside in heat four, Dlamini smashed the 28-second barrier to take the second spot with a personal lifetime best of 28.70, but fell behind the winner Ximene Gomes of Mozambique by more than half a second. Dlamini failed to advance to the semifinals, as she placed sixty-first overall out of ninety-two swimmers in the prelims.
