= Petra Klosová =

Czech swimmer (born 1986)

Personal information
- Full name: Petra Klosová
- National team: Czech Republic
- Born: 16 April 1986 (age 40) Nový Jičín, Czechoslovakia
- Height: 1.91 m (6 ft 3 in)
- Weight: 79 kg (174 lb)

Sport
- Sport: Swimming
- Strokes: Freestyle, backstroke
- College team: Southern Methodist University (U.S.)

Petra Klosová (born 16 April 1986) is a Czech swimmer who specialized in freestyle and backstroke events. She is a two-time Olympian and a multiple-time national champion and record holder for the freestyle and backstroke events (50, 100, and 200 m).

== Olympic participation ==
Klosová made her first Czech team, as an eighteen-year-old, at the 2004 Summer Olympics in Athens, where she competed in the women's 4 × 100 m freestyle relay, along with her fellow swimmers Jana Myšková, Sandra Kazíková, and Ilona Hlaváčková. Swimming the second leg, Klosová recorded a split of 56.49 seconds, and the Czech team went to finish heat one in seventh place, and thirteenth overall, for a total time of 3:46.83.

At the 2008 Summer Olympics in Beijing, Klosová competed as an individual swimmer in the 100 m backstroke. Leading up to her second Games, she cleared a FINA B-cut of 1:02.98 at the Missouri Grand Prix in Columbia, Missouri. She challenged seven other swimmers in the third heat, including 14-year-old Sarah Sjöström of Sweden, and three-time Olympian Sherry Tsai of Hong Kong. She raced to sixth place by six tenths of a second (0.6) behind Mexico's Fernanda González, with a time of 1:02.76. Klosová failed to advance into the semifinals, as she placed thirty-ninth overall in the preliminaries.

== Club swimming ==
Klosová was also a member of the SMU Mustangs swimming and diving team, and a graduate of international studies at Southern Methodist University in Dallas, Texas. She was a member of the Kopřivnice swimming team, but changed clubs to swim with Nový Jičín in 2011. She retired from competitive swimming in May 2012.
