= Oksana Serikova =

Ukrainian swimmer (born 1985)

Personal information
- Full name: Oksana Serikova
- National team: Ukraine
- Born: 11 June 1985 (age 41) Amvrosiivka, Ukrainian SSR, Soviet Union
- Height: 1.72 m (5 ft 8 in)
- Weight: 59 kg (130 lb)

Sport
- Sport: Swimming
- Strokes: Freestyle
- Club: Donshvsm

Oksana Serikova (also Oxana Serikova, Ukrainian: Оксана Серікова; born June 11, 1985) is a Ukrainian swimmer, who specialized in sprint freestyle events. She helped out her Ukrainian team to break a national record time of 4:05.56 in the women's medley relay at the 2006 European Aquatics Championships in Budapest, Hungary. She is also an eighth-place finalist in the 50 m freestyle at the 2010 European Aquatics Championships in the same location as four years before.

Serikova qualified as a lone swimmer for Ukraine in the women's 50 m freestyle at the 2008 Summer Olympics in Beijing, by clearing a FINA B-standard entry time of 25.56 from the EDF Swimming Open in Paris, France. Serikova scorched her way to sixth place and thirty-second overall in heat nine of the evening prelims with a time of 25.65, failing to advance further to the semifinals.
