= Emma Hunter (swimmer) =

Samoan New Zealander swimmer (born 1990)

Personal information
- Full name: Emma Hunter
- Nationality: Samoa
- Born: 19 March 1990 (age 36) Samoa

Sport
- Sport: Swimming
- Strokes: Freestyle, Butterfly
- Club: Papatoetoe Swimming Club, Howick Pakuranga Swimming Club
Medal record
Women's swimming
Representing Samoa
Pacific Games
Silver medal – second place	Apia 2007	5 km open water
Bronze medal – third place	Apia 2007	400 m freestyle

Emma Hunter (born 19 March 1990) is a Samoan New Zealander swimmer. Born in Samoa, she now lives in Auckland, New Zealand.

== Biography ==
In 2008, she became Samoa's first-ever female Olympic swimmer, by representing Samoa in freestyle and butterfly events at the Beijing Olympics. Hunter previously represented Samoa in freestyle and butterfly events at the 2007 World Aquatics Championships in Melbourne. She failed to qualify past the heat stages. She represented Samoa at the 2007 South Pacific Games. She won a Silver in the 5 km Open Water Swim and a Bronze in the 400m Freestyle. She became the first Samoan swimmer to gain medals at the South Pacific Games. She was also Deputy Head Girl (2008) at the Papatoetoe High School in Auckland.
