= Marianela Quesada =

Costa Rican swimmer (born 1988)

Personal information
- Full name: Marianela Quesada Barrantes
- National team: Costa Rica
- Born: 17 April 1988 (age 38) San José, Costa Rica
- Height: 1.60 m (5 ft 3 in)
- Weight: 58 kg (128 lb)

Sport
- Sport: Swimming
- Strokes: Freestyle

Marianela Quesada Barrantes (born April 17, 1988) is a Costa Rican swimmer, who specialized in sprint freestyle events. She represented Costa Rica at the 2008 Summer Olympics; she currently holds the Costa Rican national record in both the 50 and 100 m freestyle.

Quesada received a Universality invitation from FINA to compete as Costa Rica's lone female swimmer in the 50 m freestyle at the 2008 Summer Olympics in Beijing. Swimming on the outside in heat six, Quesada could not beat the vastly experienced field to round out the race in last with a time of 28.11. Quesada failed to advance to the semifinals, as she placed fifty-seventh overall out of 92 swimmers in the prelims.
