= Dashtserengiin Saintsetseg =

Mongolian swimmer (born 1990)

Personal information
- Nationality: Mongolia
- Born: 19 September 1990 (age 35) Erdenet, Mongolia
- Height: 1.66 m (5 ft 5 1/2 in)
- Weight: 54 kg (119 lb)

Sport
- Sport: Swimming
- Event: Freestyle

Dashtserengiin Saintsetseg (Mongolian: Дашцэрэнгийн Сайнцэцэг; born September 19, 1990, in Erdenet) is a Mongolian swimmer who specialized in sprint freestyle events. Dashtseren represented Mongolia at the 2008 Summer Olympics in Beijing, and competed in the women's 50 m freestyle event. She swam in the fourth heat of the competition, finishing in fifth place, with a time of 29.63 seconds. Dashtseren, placed sixty-seventh in the overall rankings and failed to progress to the semi-finals.
