= Olivia Aya Nakitanda =

Medical Doctor and Ugandan swimmer (born 1984)

Personal information
- Full name: Olivia Aya Nakitanda
- National team: Uganda
- Born: 27 August 1984 (age 42) Kampala, Uganda
- Height: 1.73 m (5 ft 8 in)
- Weight: 63 kg (139 lb)

Sport
- Sport: Swimming
- Strokes: Freestyle

Olivia Aya Nakitanda (born August 27, 1984) is a Ugandan swimmer who specialized in sprint freestyle events. She represented her nation Uganda at the 2008 Summer Olympics, placing herself among the top 70 swimmers in the 50 m freestyle.

Nakitanda was invited by FINA to compete as a 24-year-old swimmer for the Ugandan team in the women's 50 m freestyle at the 2008 Summer Olympics in Beijing. She threw down a scorching time and a lifetime best of 29.38 seconds to lead the third heat, but placed further in sixty-sixth overall out of ninety-two entrants.

Nakitanda served as the chairperson for the Athletes commission at the https://nocuganda.org/ for the quadrennial ending 2009 to 2011. Her notable contribution during this tenure was carrying out a Bilharzia screening for Rowing Sport athletes at the Luzira site on Lake Victoria in Uganda and organised access to free treatment for those affected through Mulago National Specialised Hospital. She also led the inaugural Uganda Athletes Forum held in August 2011 at Grand Imperial Hotel in Kampala, Uganda.

Nakitanda also volunteers on the Medical Commission of the https://nocuganda.org/

== Education ==
Nakitanda studied at Kampala Parents School for her primary and then proceeded to Mount Saint Mary's Namagunga for her secondary education.

Nakitanda is a graduate of medicine at Makerere University in Kampala.

== See also ==
- Jamila Lunkuse
- Ganzi Mugula
- Daisuke Ssegwanyi
- Husnah Kukundakwe
