= Amber Yobech =

Palauan swimmer

Personal information
- Born: January 27, 1991 (age 35)

Sport
- Sport: Swimming

Amber Sikosang Yobech (born January 27, 1991) is a Palauan swimmer, who specialized in sprint freestyle events. At age seventeen, she became one of the youngest swimmers to mark their Olympic debut at the 2008 Summer Olympics in Beijing. Swimming in heat three of the women's 50 m freestyle, Yobech threw down her personal best in 30.00 seconds to claim the third spot in a splash-and-dash-finish. Yobech failed to advance to the semifinals, as she placed seventy-first overall out of ninety-two entrants in the prelims.
