= Christel Simms =

American Filipino swimmer (born 1990)

Personal information
- Full name: Joan Christel Simms
- Nationality: United States
- Born: September 20, 1990 (age 36) Honolulu, Hawaii, U.S.
- Height: 5 ft 7 in (1.70 m)

Sport
- Sport: Swimming
- Strokes: Freestyle
- Club: Hawaii Swim Club
- College team: USC Trojans

Christel Simms is from Ewa Beach, Hawaii and was a college swimmer who attended the University of Southern California. She represented the Republic of the Philippines at the 2008 Summer Olympics in Beijing in the sport of swimming for the 100-meter freestyle event.

Simms passed the Olympic qualifying standard for the 100-meter freestyle swimming event at 57.17 seconds on August 8, 2007 at the USA Junior National Swimming Championships at Indianapolis. So far, Simms has broken 54 individual Hawaii State records since she was 9 years old. Simms became a member of the USA National Junior Swimming Team in 2007.

She recorded a 57.12-second time for the 100-meter freestyle heat and 26.38-second time for the 50-meter freestyle—both passing the USA Olympic trial cut.

Simms was the seventh female representative in the entire history of the Republic of the Philippines to compete in the Olympics, since the country first participated in the Paris 1924 games.

Throughout her swimming career, Simms has continued to play a leadership role among Hawaii swimmers. One of her most notable achievements include consecutively placing high among the annual, nationwide USA Swimming “Top 16 Age Group” ranking since the age of 12. A few of her most notable sport highlights include: making the USA National Junior Swimming Team at 16 years old, qualifying for the Olympics, being a 10-time Hawaii State Champion, a 4-time recipient of the Governor Linda Lingle Most Outstanding Female Swimmer Award, breaking a Western zone record in the 200-meter freestyle event at 13 years old, and having broken 54 state records (not including relays) to date.

A regular week of training for Simms typically includes a comprehensive exercise schedule of both swimming and dry land exercise – three to four hours each day, six days a week – totaling up to 18 to 24 hours a week. As a 6-year Hawaii Swim Club member, Simms trains 3 times a week at the Salt Lake Recreation Center and 3 times a week at the Veterans Memorial Aquatic Center in Waipio, Hawaii.

Christel's full name is Joan Christel Simms but she is known to her peers as "Christel."

Simms is a citizen of the Philippines, and the United States.
