= Rovena Marku =

Albanian swimmer (born 1987)

Personal information
- Full name: Rovena Marku
- Nationality: Albania
- Born: 21 May 1987 (age 39) Shkoder, Albania

Sport
- Sport: Swimming

Rovena Marku (born 21 May 1987 in Shkodër) is an Olympic freestyle swimmer from Albania, who represented her native country at the 2004 and 2008 Olympics.

At the 2008 Olympics in Beijing, she set a new Albanian record in 50 m freestyle of 28.15 – she held the previous mark at 28.79. She finished 58th in Olympics 2008.

She also swam at the 2007 World Championships in the 50 m freestyle and 50 breaststroke; and at the 2005 Mediterranean Games.
