= Zakiya Nassar =

Palestinian swimmer

Zakia Nassar
Personal information
- Full name: Zakiya Nassar
- Nationality: Palestine
- Born: April 2, 1987 (age 39) Bethlehem, Palestine
- Height: 1.62 m (5 ft 4 in)

Sport
- Sport: Swimming
- Strokes: Freestyle

Zakiya Nassar, sometimes spelled "Zakia" (Arabic: زكية نصار), born April 2, 1987, in Bethlehem, Palestine), is an Olympic swimmer from Palestine.

She represented Palestine at the 2008 Summer Olympics in Beijing. In the lead-up to the Games, her coach, relayed by the media, commented that Nassar faced severe difficulties in training, due to her lack of access to a suitable swimming pool. The Globe and Mail reported that "[t]here is no Olympic-sized pool in the Palestinian territories and no budget to speak of for the Palestinian Olympic swimmers". Nassar told the media that she was receiving no support from the Palestinian authorities, that she was able to swim once a month "at best", and that she feared a disastrous performance in Beijing. The Israeli authorities subsequently granted her authorisation to swim in a pool in Jerusalem.

Nassar won her heat in the 50 metre freestyle event, but her time of 31.97 was not sufficient for her to advance to the next round.

Nassar lives in Bethlehem and, as of 2008, was studying dentistry at the Arab American University in Jenin.
