= Heather Brand =

Zimbabwean swimmer

Personal information
- Full name: Heather Brand
- National team: Zimbabwe
- Born: 17 November 1982 (age 43) Harare, Zimbabwe
- Height: 1.73 m (5 ft 8 in)
- Weight: 60 kg (132 lb)

Sport
- Sport: Swimming
- Strokes: Freestyle, butterfly
- Club: King Aquatic Club (U.S.)
- College team: Louisiana State University (U.S.)
- Coach: Sean Hutchison (U.S.)
Medal record
Women's swimming
Representing Zimbabwe
All-Africa Games
Silver medal – second place	2007 Algiers	50 m freestyle
Silver medal – second place	2007 Algiers	50 m butterfly
Silver medal – second place	2007 Algiers	100 m butterfly
Bronze medal – third place	2007 Algiers	100 m freestyle
Bronze medal – third place	2007 Algiers	200 m butterfly

Heather Brand (born 17 November 1982) is a Zimbabwean swimmer, who specialised in freestyle and butterfly events. Brand had claimed a total of five medals (three silver and two bronze) at the 2007 All-Africa Games in Algiers, Algeria, and eventually represented her nation Zimbabwe in the 100 m butterfly at the 2008 Summer Olympics. Apart from her medal treasury, Brand also established five long and short-course national records in all butterfly events at a major international competition, spanning three editions of the World Championships.

Brand competed for Zimbabwe in the women's 100 m butterfly at the 2008 Summer Olympics in Beijing. She scored a solid Zimbabwean record of 1:00.61 to capture the 100 m butterfly crown and slide under the FINA B-cut (1:01.43) by nearly a full second at the All-Africa Games one year earlier. Swimming on the outside in heat three, Brand wound up last in a disappointing 1:01.39 to round out the eight-female pack, over two seconds behind the leader Birgit Koschischek of Austria. Brand failed to advance to the semifinals, as she placed forty-second overall out of 49 swimmers in the prelims.

Brand is the former captain of the LSU swimming team and a graduate of wildlife management at the Louisiana State University in Baton Rouge, Louisiana. She is also a resident athlete of King Aquatic Club in Federal Way, Washington, where she trained with numerous world-class swimmers, including Margaret Hoelzer and Megan Jendrick of the United States (both of whom were Olympic medalists), and Svetlana Karpeeva, an individual medley specialist from Russia.
