= Marleen Veldhuis =

Dutch swimmer

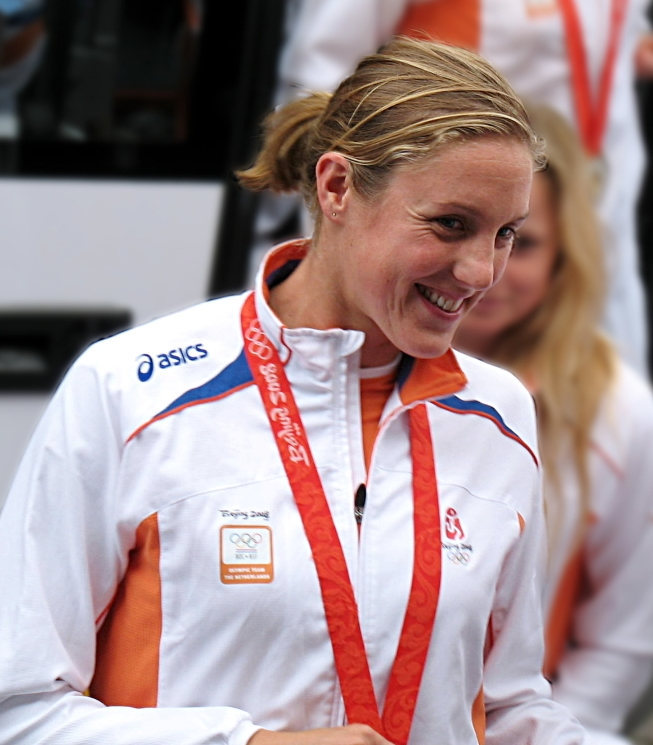
- Veldhuis in 2008

Personal information
- Full name: Magdalena Johanna Maria Veldhuis
- Nationality: Netherlands
- Born: 29 June 1979 (age 47) Borne, Netherlands
- Height: 1.82 m (6 ft 0 in)
- Weight: 65 kg (143 lb; 10.2 st)

Sport
- Sport: Swimming
- Strokes: Freestyle
- Club: Nationaal Zweminstituut Eindhoven
Medal record
Event	1st	2nd	3rd
Olympic Games	1	1	2
World Championships (LC)	2	2	4
World Championships (SC)	6	1	2
European Championships (LC)	3	4	4
European Championships (SC)	17	3	3
Total	29	11	15
Women's swimming
Representing the Netherlands
Olympic Games
Gold medal – first place	2008 Beijing	4×100 m freestyle
Silver medal – second place	2012 London	4×100 m freestyle
Bronze medal – third place	2004 Athens	4×100 m freestyle
Bronze medal – third place	2012 London	50 m freestyle
World Championships (LC)
Gold medal – first place	2009 Rome	4×100 m freestyle
Gold medal – first place	2011 Shanghai	4×100 m freestyle
Silver medal – second place	2005 Montreal	50 m freestyle
Silver medal – second place	2007 Melbourne	100 m freestyle
Bronze medal – third place	2007 Melbourne	50 m freestyle
Bronze medal – third place	2007 Melbourne	4×100 m freestyle
Bronze medal – third place	2009 Rome	50 m freestyle
Bronze medal – third place	2011 Shanghai	50 m freestyle
World Championships (SC)
Gold medal – first place	2004 Indianapolis	50 m freestyle
Gold medal – first place	2006 Shanghai	4×100 m freestyle
Gold medal – first place	2008 Manchester	50 m freestyle
Gold medal – first place	2008 Manchester	100 m freestyle
Gold medal – first place	2008 Manchester	4×100 m freestyle
Gold medal – first place	2008 Manchester	4×200 m freestyle
Silver medal – second place	2006 Shanghai	100 m freestyle
Bronze medal – third place	2004 Indianapolis	100 m freestyle
Bronze medal – third place	2006 Shanghai	50 m freestyle
European Championships (LC)
Gold medal – first place	2008 Eindhoven	50 m freestyle
Gold medal – first place	2008 Eindhoven	100 m freestyle
Gold medal – first place	2008 Eindhoven	4×100 m freestyle
Silver medal – second place	2004 Madrid	100 m freestyle
Silver medal – second place	2004 Madrid	4×100 m freestyle
Silver medal – second place	2006 Budapest	100 m freestyle
Silver medal – second place	2006 Budapest	4×100 m freestyle
Bronze medal – third place	2002 Berlin	4×100 m freestyle
Bronze medal – third place	2004 Madrid	4×100 m medley
Bronze medal – third place	2006 Budapest	50 m freestyle
Bronze medal – third place	2008 Eindhoven	4×100 m medley
European Championships (SC)
Gold medal – first place	2003 Dublin	50 m freestyle
Gold medal – first place	2003 Dublin	4×50 m freestyle
Gold medal – first place	2004 Vienna	50 m freestyle
Gold medal – first place	2004 Vienna	4×50 m freestyle
Gold medal – first place	2004 Vienna	4×50 m medley
Gold medal – first place	2005 Trieste	50 m freestyle
Gold medal – first place	2005 Trieste	100 m freestyle
Gold medal – first place	2005 Trieste	4×50 m freestyle
Gold medal – first place	2005 Trieste	4×50 m medley
Gold medal – first place	2006 Helsinki	50 m freestyle
Gold medal – first place	2006 Helsinki	100 m freestyle
Gold medal – first place	2007 Debrecen	50 m freestyle
Gold medal – first place	2007 Debrecen	4×50 m freestyle
Gold medal – first place	2008 Rijeka	50 m freestyle
Gold medal – first place	2008 Rijeka	100 m freestyle
Gold medal – first place	2008 Rijeka	4×50 m freestyle
Gold medal – first place	2008 Rijeka	4×50 m medley
Silver medal – second place	2004 Vienna	100 m freestyle
Silver medal – second place	2006 Helsinki	4×50 m freestyle
Silver medal – second place	2007 Debrecen	100 m freestyle
Bronze medal – third place	2002 Riesa	4×50 m freestyle
Bronze medal – third place	2002 Riesa	4×50 m medley
Bronze medal – third place	2003 Dublin	4×50 m medley

Magdalena Johanna Maria "Marleen" Veldhuis (born 29 June 1979) is a retired swimmer from the Netherlands. She was world record holder in six events (three individual events and three relay events). Veldhuis won eight world championships gold medals and 20 European championships gold medals. In the Olympics, she won a bronze medal in London 2012 in the 50 m freestyle, as well as three relay medals: bronze in Athens 2004, gold in Beijing 2008, and silver in London 2012.

== Personal life ==
Veldhuis was born on 29 June 1979 in Borne in the Netherlands. She was brought up in the eastern part of the Netherlands. Veldhuis had a daughter in June 2010, causing her to miss the 2010 European Aquatics Championships, and she returned to swimming for the 2011 and 2012 seasons.

== Swimming career ==
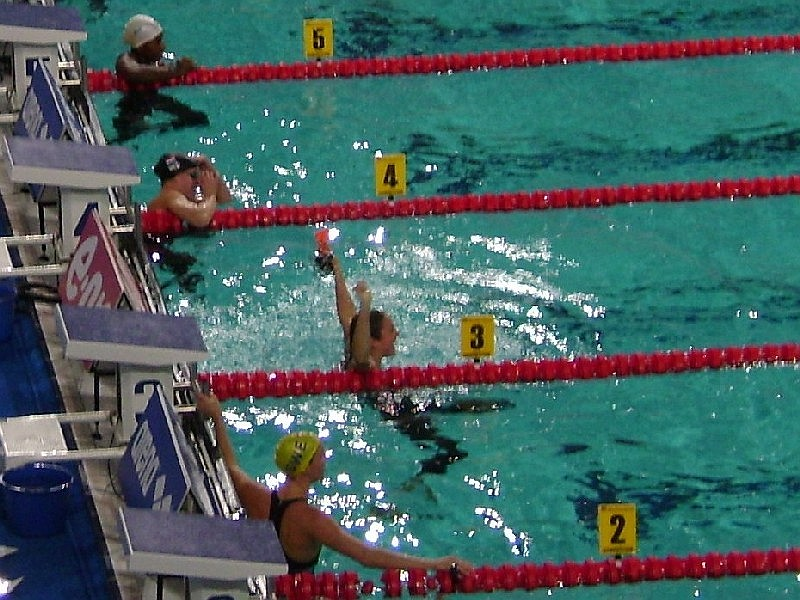
Veldhuis celebrates her world record in the 50 m freestyle at the 2008 European Aquatics Championships in Eindhoven

Marleen Veldhuis is a former water polo player which she combined with swimming. After she decided to focus completely on swimming, Veldhuis made her international debut during the 2002 European Aquatics Championships in Berlin, at the relatively late age of 23, where she won a bronze medal in the 4×100 m freestyle as part of a team with Manon van Rooijen, Chantal Groot and Wilma van Hofwegen. At the end of the year, she competed in Riesa for the European Short Course Swimming Championships 2002. There she won bronze medals in both relays, 4×50 m freestyle and 4×50 m medley.

=== Breakthrough ===
In April 2003 she joined Topzwemmen Amsterdam (TZA) to train as a full-time professional under the guidance of Fedor Hes. At the 2003 World Aquatics Championships it turned out to be a great decision as she reached two individual finals in the 50 m freestyle ending 7th, and in the 100 m freestyle finishing 8th. In Barcelona she also reached the final in all relay events but did not win a medal. In December she participated in the European Short Course Swimming Championships 2003 where she won her first international titles in the 50 m freestyle and the 4×50 m freestyle. In Dublin she also won silver in the 100 m freestyle and bronze in the 4×50 m medley. 2004 started off with the 2004 European Aquatics Championships in Madrid. There Veldhuis won two silver medals in the 4×100 m freestyle, together with Chantal Groot, Annabel Kosten and Inge Dekker, and individually in the 100 m freestyle. At the end of the week there was a bronze medal in the 4×100 m medley relay alongside Stefanie Luiken, Madelon Baans and Chantal Groot.

=== 2004 Olympics ===
At the 2004 Summer Olympics Veldhuis made her Olympic debut at the age of 25 and won the bronze medal in the 4×100 m freestyle, together with Inge de Bruijn, Inge Dekker and Chantal Groot. Her individual results at the Olympics were slightly disappointing with the 9th place in the 50 m freestyle and the 11th place in the 100 m freestyle. She was the anchor lady in the 4×100 m medley, she took over from de Bruijn who swam the butterfly leg, finishing 6th. At the end of 2004 she was declared Amsterdam Sportswoman of the year.

=== Post-Athens season ===
In October 2004 she avenged her failed individual Olympic campaign by winning the gold medal in the 50 m freestyle at the 2004 FINA Short Course World Championships in Indianapolis by beating Libby Lenton from Australia and Therese Alshammar from Sweden. In the 100 m freestyle she received a bronze medal behind Lenton and Sweden's Josefin Lillhage. In December she successfully defended her 50 m freestyle at the European Short Course Swimming Championships 2004. In Vienna she also won gold in both 4×50 m freestyle and 4×50 m medley, there was a silver medal for Veldhuis in the 100 m freestyle behind French Malia Metella. She achieved her best long-course result so far by winning the silver medal in the 50 m freestyle at the 2005 World Aquatics Championships in Montreal, which was the only medal for her country during these World Championships. The European Short Course Swimming Championships 2005 were very successful for Veldhuis. In Trieste she defended all her titles from the year before, but now she won also the gold medal in the 100 m freestyle.

=== 2006 ===
In April 2006 alongside Chantal Groot, Hinkelien Schreuder and Inge Dekker, Veldhuis set a world record and won the gold medal in the 4×100 m freestyle relay at the 2006 FINA Short Course World Championships. She failed to defend her 50 m freestyle title ending third. She finished second behind long-time rival Libby Lenton in the 100 m freestyle. In the summer she competed in the 2006 European Aquatics Championships, in Budapest, Hungary where she ended second in the 100 m freestyle, behind Germany's Britta Steffen who broke the world record, and third in the 50 m freestyle. In the 4×100 m freestyle relay she received a silver medal together with Chantal Groot, Inge Dekker and newcomer Ranomi Kromowidjojo. After these Championships she split up with her coach, Fedor Hes, and started to work with Jacco Verhaeren, who at the time was also working with triple Olympic champion Pieter van den Hoogenband. In Helsinki she successfully defended her 50 m and 100 m freestyle titles at the European Short Course Swimming Championships 2006, but lost her relay titles when her team ended second in the 4×50 m freestyle and did not start in the 4×50 m medley. Just before this championships she had bettered Annemarie Verstappen's long standing 200 m freestyle national record.

=== 2007 ===
In the spring of 2007 she took part in the 2007 World Aquatics Championships in Melbourne, Australia. There she won the silver medal behind Libby Lenton. Veldhuis won the bronze medal in the 50 m freestyle despite being the favourite before the final. Alongside Inge Dekker, Ranomi Kromowidjojo, and another young talent Femke Heemskerk, she won bronze in the 4×100 m freestyle relay. In November at the Berlin leg of the 2007 FINA Swimming World Cup series, Veldhuis broke Swede Therese Alshammar's 50 m freestyle world record. Alshammar's world record had stood at 23.59 since March 2000. The new standard is 23.58 seconds. One month later she qualified for the Beijing Olympics with personal bests in the 50 and 100 m freestyle during the Dutch Open Swim Cup 2007 and competed at the European Short Course Swimming Championships 2007. In Debrecen she won the 50 m freestyle for the fifth time in a row but lost her 100 m freestyle title to Britta Steffen due to a bad turn, finishing second. She also won gold in the 4×50 m freestyle. A few days after the tournament she was elected Dutch Sportswoman of the Year.

=== Spring 2008 ===
In March 2008 at the 2008 European Aquatics Championships in Eindhoven, she won the 100 m and 50 m freestyle. In the latter event she broke the eight-year-old world record, set at the 2000 Summer Olympics by Inge de Bruijn, with a time of 24.09. She also broke the 4×100 m freestyle relay world record, together with Inge Dekker, Ranomi Kromowidjojo and Femke Heemskerk, and won the gold medal. The new standard was 3:33.62. Veldhuis also won a bronze medal in 4×100 m medley alongside Hinkelien Schreuder, Jolijn van Valkengoed and Inge Dekker. In April's 2008 FINA Short Course World Championships in Manchester Veldhuis won four gold medals. Individually in the 50 m freestyle, lowering her own world record to 23.25, and the 100 m freestyle beating home favourite Francesca Halsall. Furthermore, she won gold in the 4×200 m freestyle with Dekker, Heemskerk and Kromowidjojo, bettering the world record. With Hinkelien Schreuder replacing Kromowidjojo, the Dutch team also lowered their own world record in the 4×100 m freestyle.

=== 2008 Summer Olympics ===
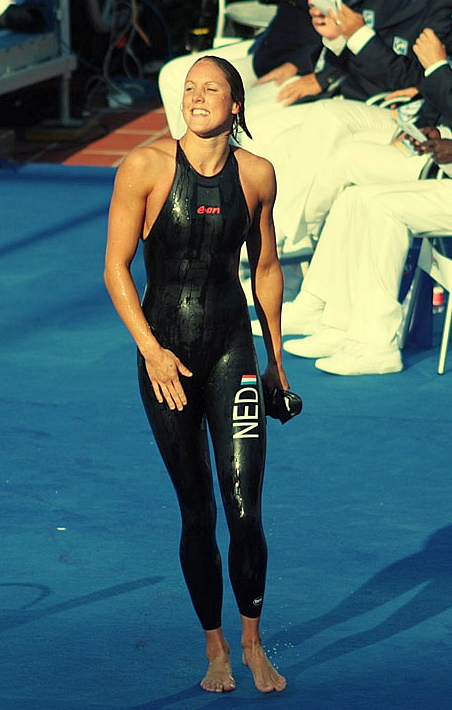
Marleen Veldhuis at the World Championships 2009 in Rome.

At the 2008 Summer Olympics she won the gold medal in the 4×100 m freestyle relay together with Inge Dekker, Ranomi Kromowidjojo and Femke Heemskerk, they swam just 0.14 seconds outside their own world record. Individually she did not achieve what she expected to, with the sixth place in the 100 m freestyle and the fifth in the 50 m freestyle.

=== Fall 2008 ===
Veldhuis kicked off her new season at the Swim Cup Eindhoven 2008. She qualified for the 50 m and 100 m butterfly at the 2009 World Aquatics Championships, for the 50 m and 100 m freestyle she had already qualified at the Olympics. The next week, she won four gold medals at the European Short Course Swimming Championships 2008 in Rijeka, Croatia, in the 50 m and 100 m freestyle and 4×50 m freestyle and 4×50 m medley. In the 100 m freestyle she lowered her own European record during the heats, she also finished fourth in the 100 m butterfly.

=== 2009 ===
During the Amsterdam Swim Cup Veldhuis broke the 50 metre butterfly world record and 50 metre freestyle world record on the same day. At the 2009 World Aquatics Championships in Rome, Italy she won the gold medal in the 4×100 m freestyle alongside Inge Dekker, Ranomi Kromowidjojo and Femke Heemskerk.

=== 2011 ===
In 2011 Veldhuis won a gold medal at the 2011 World Aquatics Championships as part of the 4 × 100 m freestyle relay alongside Inge Dekker, Ranomi Kromowidjojo and Femke Heemskerk in a time of 3:33.96.

=== 2012 ===
At the 2012 Summer Olympics she won a bronze medal in the 50 m freestyle (her first Olympic medal in an individual event, in a time of 24.39) and a silver medal in the 4 × 100 m freestyle.

== Personal bests ==
Short course
Event	Time	Date	Location
50 m freestyle	Former WR 23.25	2008-04-13	Manchester, United Kingdom
100 m freestyle	Former ER 51.74	2008-12-21	Amsterdam, Netherlands
200 m freestyle	1:55.56	2008-12-21	Amsterdam, Netherlands
50 m butterfly	25.88	2007-10-13	Aachen, Germany
100 m butterfly	57.00	2008-12-20	Amsterdam, Netherlands

Long course
Event	Time	Date	Location
50 m freestyle	Former WR 23.96	2009-04-19	Amsterdam, Netherlands
100 m freestyle	Former NR 53.17	2009-04-18	Amsterdam, Netherlands
200 m freestyle	1:58.26	2006-12-01	Eindhoven, Netherlands
50 m butterfly	25.28	31 July 2009	Rome, Italy
100 m butterfly	56.69	2009-04-17	Amsterdam, Netherlands

Records
Preceded by Inge de Bruijn	Women's 50 metres freestyle world record holder (long course); 24 March 2008 – 29 March 2008	Succeeded by Libby Trickett
Preceded by Libby Trickett	Women's 50 metres freestyle world record holder (long course); 19 April 2009 – 2 August 2009	Succeeded by Britta Steffen
Preceded by Therese Alshammar	Women's 50 metres butterfly world record holder (long course); 19 April 2009 – 29 July 2009	Succeeded by Therese Alshammar
Preceded by Therese Alshammar	Women's 50 metres freestyle world record holder (short course); 17 November 2007 – 7 August 2013	Succeeded by Ranomi Kromowidjojo
Awards
Preceded by Marrit Leenstra	Amsterdam Sportswoman of the Year; 2004	Succeeded by Marit van Eupen
Preceded by Ireen Wüst	Dutch Sportswoman of the Year; 2007	Succeeded by Marianne Vos
