= Sharon Fajardo =

Honduran swimmer (born 1989)

Personal information
- Full name: Sharon Paola Fajardo Sierra
- National team: Honduras
- Born: 7 November 1989 (age 36) Puerto Cortés, Honduras
- Height: 1.58 m (5 ft 2 in)
- Weight: 54 kg (119 lb)

Sport
- Sport: Swimming
- Strokes: Freestyle

Sharon Paola Fajardo Sierra (born November 7, 1989, in Puerto Cortés) is a Honduran swimmer, who specialized in sprint freestyle events. She represented her nation Honduras at the 2008 Summer Olympics, and had held Honduran records in both 50 and 100 m freestyle, which were eventually broken by Julimar Avila in 2013.

Fajardo received a Universality invitation from FINA to compete as Honduras' lone female swimmer in the women's 50 m freestyle at the 2008 Summer Olympics in Beijing. Swimming as the fastest entrant in heat five, Fajardo pulled away with a magnificent effort from a scorching field to hit the wall first in a Honduran record and a lifetime best of 27.19. Fajardo failed to advance to the semifinals, as she placed fifty-first overall out of ninety-two swimmers in the prelims.
