= Julianne Kirchner =

American and Marshallese swimmer

Personal information
- Full name: Julianne Kirchner
- National team: Marshall Islands
- Born: 19 December 1991 (age 34) Florence, Alabama, United States
- Weight: 54 kg (119 lb)

Sport
- Sport: Swimming
- Strokes: Freestyle
- Club: Kwajalein Swim Team
- Coach: Sarah Stepchew

Julianne Kirchner (born December 19, 1991) is an American and Marshallese swimmer, who specialized in sprint freestyle events. Having moved with her family to the Marshall Islands at a very young age because of her father's occupation, Kirchner acquired a dual citizenship to participate internationally for her new homeland in swimming at the 2008 Summer Olympics.

Kirchner was one of the five athletes to mark an Olympic debut for the Marshall Islands at the 2008 Summer Olympics in Beijing, competing in the women's 50 m freestyle. She established a personal best of 30.42 to take the fourth spot and seventy-fifth overall in heat three of the morning prelims, failing to advance to the top 16 semifinals.

As of 2008, Kirchner was a member of Kwajalein Swim Team in the Marshall Islands under the tutelage of her personal coach Sarah Stepchew.
