= Madeleine Scerri =

Australian swimmer (born 1989)

Personal information
- Full name: Madeleine Scerri
- National team: Malta
- Born: 11 August 1989 (age 36) Melbourne, Victoria, Australia
- Height: 1.76 m (5 ft 9 in)
- Weight: 74 kg (163 lb)

Sport
- Sport: Swimming
- Strokes: Freestyle

Madeleine Scerri (born 11 August 1989) is an Australian swimmer of Maltese origin, who specialized in freestyle events. She participated for Malta in the 2008 Beijing Olympics. After being a coach at a successful swimming club, she left and got married She represented Malta at the 2008 Summer Olympics in Beijing, along with her fellow swimmer and teammate Ryan Gambin, who shared their same ancestral background. Scerri swam in the women's 100 m freestyle, and won in the first heat of her event, finishing 45th the overall. Although she failed to advance into the semi-finals, Scerri broke her personal and national record, with a time of 57.97 seconds.
