= Razan Taha =

Jordanian swimmer

Personal information
- Born: December 29, 1991 (age 34) Amman, Jordan

Sport
- Sport: Swimming

Razan Taha (Arabic: رزان طه; born December 29, 1991) is a Jordanian swimmer, who specialized in sprint freestyle events. She represented her nation Jordan at the 2008 Summer Olympics, placing herself among the top 70 swimmers in the 50 m freestyle.

At age sixteen, Taha became one of the youngest swimmers to mark their debut for the 2008 Summer Olympics in Beijing, competing in the women's 50 m freestyle. She raced to fourth in heat five with a time of 27.82, just a close, hundredth-second margin (0.010 behind top three finisher Dalia Tórrez Zamora of Nicaragua. Taha, however, failed to advance into the semi-finals, as she placed fifty-sixth overall out of ninety-two swimmers in the prelims.
