= Ellen Hight =

Zambian swimmer (born 1981)

Personal information
- Full name: Ellen Lendra Hight
- Nationality: Zambia
- Born: 13 February 1981 (age 45) Kalulushi, Copperbelt, Zambia
- Height: 1.65 m (5 ft 5 in)
- Weight: 58 kg (128 lb)

Sport
- Sport: Swimming
- Strokes: Freestyle, butterfly
Medal record
Women's swimming
Representing Zambia
All-Africa Games
Bronze medal – third place	2007 Algiers	100 m butterfly

Ellen Lendra Hight (born February 13, 1981) is a Zambian swimmer, who specialized in freestyle and butterfly events. She represented her nation Zambia in two editions of the Olympic Games (2000 and 2008).

Hight made her first Zambian team debut, as a 19-year-old junior, at the 2000 Summer Olympics in Sydney. Swimming in heat two of the women's 100 m butterfly, she touched out Uzbekistan's Mariya Bugakova to obtain a fifth-place finish and forty-seventh overall with a time of 1:09.34.

Three years after her Olympic debut, Hight retired from swimming to focus primarily on her coaching career at the Pacific Coast Swimming Club in Victoria, British Columbia, Canada.

In 2007, Hight came out of retirement to compete at the All-Africa Games in Algiers, Algeria, where she had won a bronze medal in the women's 100 m butterfly, with an impressive time of 1:03.38. Her success and outstanding performance at the All-Africa Games marked her return to the Olympics in Beijing 2008 There, she swam to seventh and fifty-third overall in heat six of the women's 50 m freestyle, posting her best time at 27.42 seconds.

Hight also received a Bachelor of Science degree major in sports science at the University of Bath in England, and was highly appointed as the nation's sport ambassador in 2003.
