= Sviatlana Khakhlova =

Belarusian swimmer

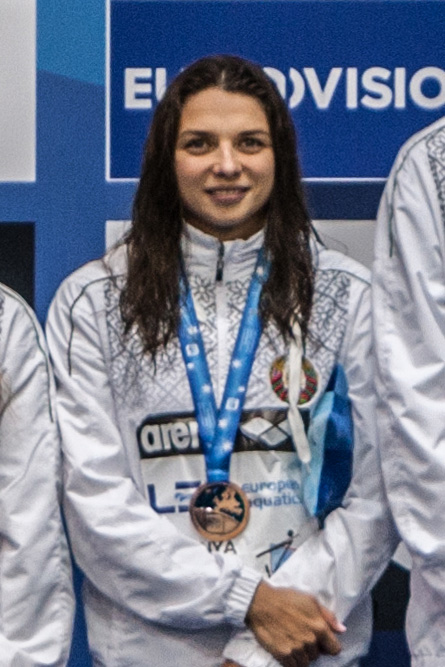
- Kohkova with bronze medal won at the 4X50m mixed medley relay, 2015 European Short Course Championships, Netanya

Personal information
- Born: 2 October 1984 (age 41) Minsk, Belarus
- Height: 1.76 m (5 ft 9 in)
- Weight: 56 kg (123 lb)

Sport
- Sport: Swimming
- Club: SK VS Minsk oblast
Medal record
Women's swimming
Representing Belarus
European Championships (LC)
Silver medal – second place	2004 Madrid	50 m freestyle
Bronze medal – third place	2008 Eindhoven	50 m butterfly
European Championships (SC)
Silver medal – second place	2002 Riesa	4×50 m freestyle
Bronze medal – third place	2006 Helsinki	100 m medley
Bronze medal – third place	2011 Szczecin	50 m butterfly
Bronze medal – third place	2012 Chartres	4×50 m freestyle
Bronze medal – third place	2015 Netanya	4×50 m mixed medley

Sviatlana Anatolyewna Khakhlova (Belarusian: Святлана Анатольеўна Хахлова, Russian: Светлана Анатольевна Хохлова; born 2 October 1984) is a Belarusian backstroke, butterfly, freestyle and medley swimmer who won five medals at European championships in 2002–2011. She competed at the 2004, 2008 and 2012 Summer Olympics in six events, but did not reach the finals.
