= Synchronised swimming at the 2011 World Aquatics Championships – Duet technical routine =

The Duet technical routine competition of the Synchronised swimming events at the 2011 World Aquatics Championships was held on July 17 with the preliminary round and the final on July 18.

== Medalists ==
Gold	Silver	Bronze
Russia; Natalia Ishchenko; Svetlana Romashina; Alexandra Zueva (reserve)	China; Huang Xuechen; Liu Ou; Luo Xi (reserve)	Spain; Ona Carbonell; Andrea Fuentes

== Results ==
The preliminary round was held at 14:00 local time. The final was held at 19:15 on the following day.

Green denotes finalists

Rank	Diver	Nationality	Preliminary		Final	
Rank	Diver	Nationality	Points	Rank	Points	Rank
1st place, gold medalist(s)	Natalia Ishchenko; Svetlana Romashina	Russia	97.500	1	98.200	1
2nd place, silver medalist(s)	Huang Xuechen; Liu Ou	China	95.800	2	96.500	2
3rd place, bronze medalist(s)	Ona Carbonell; Andrea Fuentes	Spain	94.400	3	95.400	3
4	Élise Marcotte; Marie-Pier Boudreau Gagnon	Canada	93.900	4	94.100	4
5	Yukiko Inui; Chisa Kobayashi	Japan	92.600	5	92.800	5
6	Daria Iushko; Kseniya Sydorenko	Ukraine	90.900	6	91.300	6
7	Giulia Lapi; Mariangela Perrupato	Italy	89.900	7	90.100	7
8	Sara Labrousse; Chloé Willhelm	France	88.500	9	88.900	8
9	Mary Killman; Lyssa Wallace	United States	89.000	8	88.500	9
10	Olivia Allison; Jenna Randall	Great Britain	87.800	10	87.300	10
11	Evangelia Platanioti; Despoina Solomou	Greece	87.600	11	87.200	11
12	Nayara Figueira; Lara Teixeira	Brazil	87.400	12	86.000	12
13	Jang Hyang-Mi; Wang Ok-Gyong	North Korea	86.700	13		
14	Anastasia Gloushkov; Inna Yoffe	Israel	86.000	14		
15	Park Hyun-Ha; Park Hyun-sun	South Korea	85.500	15		
15	Soňa Bernardová; Alžběta Dufková	Czech Republic	85.500	15		
17	Anna Kulkina; Aigerim Zhexembinova	Kazakhstan	85.400	17		
18	Elisabeth Sneeuw; Nicolien Wellen	Netherlands	83.700	18		
19	Pamela Fischer; Anja Nyffeler	Switzerland	83.200	19		
20	Mariana Cifuentes; Evelyn Guajardo	Mexico	82.900	20		
21	Eszter Czékus; Szofi Kiss	Hungary	82.300	21		
22	Nadine Brandl; Livia Lang	Austria	82.000	22		
23	Nastassia Mekhanikava; Darya Navaselskaya	Belarus	79.800	23		
24	Etel Sánchez; Sofia Sánchez	Argentina	79.200	24		
25	Dasa Baloghova; Jana Labathova	Slovakia	77.300	25		
26	Eloise Amberger; Sarah Bombell	Australia	76.400	26		
27	Wiebke Jeske; Edith Zeppenfeld	Germany	75.800	27		
28	Mónica Arango; Jennifer Cerquera	Colombia	75.600	28		
28	Dalia Mohamed Elgebaly; Reem Wail Abdalazem	Egypt	75.600	28		
30	Iglika Goleminova; Kalina Yordanova	Bulgaria	74.400	30		
31	Anastasiya Ruzmetova; Anastasiya Zdraykovakaya	Uzbekistan	74.300	31		
32	Katrina Ann; Hui Chuen Png	Malaysia	72.900	32		
33	Cristina Nicolini; Elena Tini	San Marino	71.900	33		
34	Melis Öner; Tuğçe Tanış	Turkey	71.800	34		
35	Lianne Caraballo; Darlys Rodríguez	Cuba	71.400	35		
35	Rosamaria Avila; Fredmary Zambrano	Venezuela	71.400	35		
37	Arthittaya Kittithanatphum; Nantaya Polsen	Thailand	67.800	37		
38	Caitlin Anderson; Kirstin Anderson	New Zealand	67.600	38		
39	Stephanie Chen; Hui Yu Yap	Singapore	67.200	39		
40	Nadezhda Gómez; Violeta Mitinian	Costa Rica	65.800	40		
41	Megawati Suyanto; Samara Talia Pattiasina	Indonesia	62.800	41		
42	Emma Manners-Wood; Nicola David	South Africa	61.500	42		
