= Synchronised swimming at the 2011 World Aquatics Championships – Duet free routine =

The Duet free routine competition of the Synchronised swimming events at the 2011 World Aquatics Championships was held on July 19 with the preliminary round and the final on 22 July.

== Medalists ==
Gold	Silver	Bronze
Russia; Natalia Ishchenko; Svetlana Romashina; Alexandra Zueva (reserve)	China; Jiang Tingting; Jiang Wenwen	Spain; Ona Carbonell; Andrea Fuentes

== Results ==
The preliminary round was held on July 19. The final was held on July 22.

Green denotes finalists

Rank	Diver	Nationality	Preliminary		Final	
Rank	Diver	Nationality	Points	Rank	Points	Rank
1st place, gold medalist(s)	Natalia Ishchenko; Svetlana Romashina	Russia	98.490	1	98.410	1
2nd place, silver medalist(s)	Jiang Tingting; Jiang Wenwen	China	96.770	2	96.810	2
3rd place, bronze medalist(s)	Ona Carbonell; Andrea Fuentes	Spain	96.020	3	96.500	3
4	Élise Marcotte; Marie-Pier Boudreau Gagnon	Canada	94.100	4	94.950	4
5	Yukiko Inui; Chisa Kobayashi	Japan	92.720	5	92.710	5
6	Daria Iushko; Kseniya Sydorenko	Ukraine	92.100	6	91.580	6
7	Giulia Lapi; Mariangela Perrupato	Italy	90.860	7	89.800	7
8	Olivia Allison; Jenna Randall	Great Britain	88.520	9	88.460	8
9	Sara Labrousse; Maite Mejean	France	88.740	8	88.100	9
10	Evangelia Platanioti; Despoina Solomou	Greece	87.800	11	86.950	10
11	Mary Killman; Lyssa Wallace	United States	87.970	10	86.190	11
12	Nayara Figueira; Lara Teixeira	Brazil	86.520	12	85.770	12
13	Soňa Bernardová; Alžběta Dufková	Czech Republic	86.480	13		
14	Jang Hyang-Mi; Wang Ok-Gyong	North Korea	86.450	14		
15	Park Hyun-Ha; Park Hyun-Sun	South Korea	85.600	15		
16	Elisabeth Sneeuw; Nicolien Wellen	Netherlands	85.570	16		
17	Anna Kulkina; Aigerim Zhexembinova	Kazakhstan	85.490	17		
18	Anastasia Gloushkov; Inna Yoffe	Israel	84.840	18		
19	Pamela Fischer; Anja Nyffeler	Switzerland	83.060	19		
20	Nadine Brandl; Livia Lang	Austria	82.680	20		
21	Evelyn Guajardo; Isabel Delgado	Mexico	82.130	21		
22	Etel Sánchez; Sofía Sánchez	Argentina	80.110	22		
23	Nastassia Mekhanikava; Darya Navaselskaya	Belarus	79.950	23		
24	Eszter Czekus; Szofi Kiss	Hungary	79.690	24		
25	Mónica Arango; Jennifer Cerquera	Colombia	77.900	25		
26	Eloise Amberger; Sarah Bombell	Australia	76.690	26		
27	Wiebke Jeske; Edith Zeppenfeld	Germany	76.680	27		
28	Iglika Goleminova; Kalina Yordanova	Bulgaria	76.650	28		
29	Dasa Baloghova; Jana Labathova	Slovakia	76.240	29		
30	Dalia Mohamed Elgebaly; Reem Wail Abdalazem	Egypt	76.040	30		
31	Anastasiya Ruzmetova; Anastasiya Zdraykovskaya	Uzbekistan	75.060	31		
32	Cristina Nicolini; Elena Tini	San Marino	73.640	32		
33	Katrina Ann; Hui Chuen Png	Malaysia	73.490	33		
34	Caitlin Anderson; Kirstin Anderson	New Zealand	72.630	34		
35	Rosamaria Avila; Fredmary Zambrano	Venezuela	70.550	35		
36	Lianne Caraballo; Arianne Rodriguez	Cuba	70.330	36		
37	Lacin Akcal; Melis Oner	Turkey	69.420	37		
38	Stephanie Chen; Hui Yu Yap	Singapore	68.790	38		
39	Arthittaya Kittithanatphum; Nantaya Polsen	Thailand	66.560	39		
40	Kou Chin; Lo Wai Lam	Macau	65.910	40		
41	Sabihisma Arsyi; Tri Eka Sandiri	Indonesia	65.000	41		
42	Emma Manners-Wood; Laura Strugnell	South Africa	63.900	42		
43	Nadezhda Gomez; Violeta Mitinian	Costa Rica	63.750	43		
