= Japan at the 2011 World Aquatics Championships =

- Flag of Japan
- World Aquatics code: JPN
- National federation: Japan Swimming Federation
- Website: www.swim.or.jp

in Shanghai, China
- Competitors: 61 in 5 sports
- Medals Ranked 21st: Gold 0 Silver 4 Bronze 2 Total 6

World Aquatics Championships appearances
- 1973; 1975; 1978; 1982; 1986; 1991; 1994; 1998; 2001; 2003; 2005; 2007; 2009; 2011; 2013; 2015; 2017; 2019; 2022; 2023; 2024; 2025

The Japanese team competed at the 2011 World Aquatics Championships in Shanghai, China.

== Medalists ==
Medal	Name	Sport	Event	Date
Silver	Takeshi Matsuda	Swimming	Men's 200m Butterfly	27 July
Silver	Aya Terakawa	Swimming	Women's 50m Backstroke	28 July
Silver	Ryosuke Irie	Swimming	Men's 200m Backstroke	29 July
Silver	Kosuke Kitajima	Swimming	Men's 200m Breaststroke	29 July
Bronze	Ryosuke Irie	Swimming	Men's 100m Backstroke	26 July
Bronze	Yuya Horihata	Swimming	Men's 400m IM	31 July

== Diving ==
There were 8 divers (4 men & 4 females) that competed at the 2011 World Aquatics Championships, including four-time Olympian Ken Terauchi (as of April 12, 2011).

Men

Athlete	Event	Preliminary		Semifinals		Final	
Athlete	Event	Points	Rank	Points	Rank	Points	Rank
Ken Terauchi	Men's 3m Springboard	444.75	5 Q	426.70	14	did not advance	
Sho Sakai	Men's 3m Springboard	438.15	7 Q	430.85	13	did not advance	
Sho Sakai	Men's 10m Platform	DNS		did not advance			
Kazuki Murakami	Men's 10m Platform	448.25	9 Q	415.10	13	did not advance	
Yu Okamoto; Sho Sakai	Men's 3m Synchro Springboard	371.55	10 Q			395.19	9
Kazuki Murakami; Yu Okamoto	Men's 10m Synchro Platform	396.12	8 Q			380.52	9

Women

Athlete	Event	Preliminary		Semifinals		Final	
Athlete	Event	Points	Rank	Points	Rank	Points	Rank
Yuka Mabuchi	Women's 1m Springboard	219.50	29			did not advance	
Yuka Mabuchi	Women's 3m Springboard	243.35	33	did not advance			
Sayaka Shibusawa	Women's 1m Springboard	240.80	20			did not advance	
Sayaka Shibusawa	Women's 3m Springboard	280.65	18 Q	294.60	14	did not advance	
Mai Nakagawa	Women's 10m Platform	304.00	11 Q	257.25	18	did not advance	
Fuka Tatsumi	Women's 10m Platform	261.95	23	did not advance			
Mai Nakagawa; Sayaka Shibusawa	Women's 3m Synchro Springboard	247.80	13			did not advance	

== Open water swimming ==
Men

Athlete	Event	Final	
Athlete	Event	Time	Position
Yasunari Hirai	Men's 5km	56:30.6	12
Yasunari Hirai	Men's 10km	1:58:19.2	36

Women

Athlete	Event	Final	
Athlete	Event	Time	Position
Yumi Kida	Women's 5km	DSQ	
Yumi Kida	Women's 10km	2:07:07.7	35
Ayano Koguchi	Women's 5km	1:03:20.2	31
Ayano Koguchi	Women's 10km	2:11:48.9	42

== Swimming ==
There will be 26 swimmers (15 men & 11 females) that will compete at the 2011 World Aquatics Championships.

Men

Athlete	Event	Heats		Semifinals		Final	
Athlete	Event	Time	Rank	Time	Rank	Time	Rank
Takuro Fujii	Men's 100m Freestyle	49.13	21	did not advance			
Takuro Fujii	Men's 100m Butterfly	51.82	2 Q	51.69	4 Q	51.75	5
Yuki Kobori	Men's 200m Freestyle	1:48.19	13 Q	1:48.65	16	did not advance	
Sho Uchida	Men's 200m Freestyle	1:48.64	19	did not advance			
Sho Uchida	Men's 400m Freestyle	349.70	17			did not advance	
Yohsuke Miyamoto	Men's 800m Freestyle	7:57.13	14			did not advance	
Yohsuke Miyamoto	Men's 1500m Freestyle	14:57.12	7 Q			15:20.67	8
Junya Koga	Men's 50m Backstroke	25.17	6 Q	25.14	9	did not advance	
Junya Koga	Men's 100m Backstroke	54.32	15 Q	54.16	14	did not advance	
Ryosuke Irie	Men's 50m Backstroke	DNS		did not advance			
Ryosuke Irie	Men's 100m Backstroke	53.99	8 Q	53.05	2 Q	52.98	Bronze medal
Ryosuke Irie	Men's 200m Backstroke	1:57.58	6 Q	1:55.96	2 Q	1:54.11	Silver medal
Kazuki Watanabe	Men's 200m Backstroke	1:57.62	7 Q	1:57.97	7 Q	1:57.82	8
Ryo Tateishi	Men's 50m Breaststroke	28.01	17	did not advance			
Ryo Tateishi	Men's 100m Breaststroke	1:00.37	8 Q	1:00.36	9	did not advance	
Kosuke Kitajima	Men's 100m Breaststroke	59.96	3 Q	59.77	2 Q	1:00.03	4
Kosuke Kitajima	Men's 200m Breaststroke	2:11.17	6 Q	2:08.81	1 Q	2:08.63	Silver medal
Naoya Tomita	Men's 200m Breaststroke	2:12.73	15 Q	2:11.98	12	did not advance	
Takeshi Matsuda	Men's 200m Butterfly	1:55.98	5 Q	1:54.30	1 Q	1:54.01	Silver medal
Ryusuke Sakata	Men's 200m Butterfly	1:57.66	20	did not advance			
Yuya Horihata	Men's 200m IM	1:59.25	6 Q	1:59.47	8 Q	1:59.52	8
Yuya Horihata	Men's 400m IM	4:13.68	2 Q			4:11.98	Bronze medal
Takuro Fujii; Shogo Hihara; Yoshihiro Okumura; Takeshi Matsuda	Men's 4 × 100 m Freestyle Relay	3:16.63	10			did not advance	
Takeshi Matsuda; Shogo Hihara; Yuki Kobori; Yoshihiro Okumura; Sho Uchida*	Men's 4 × 200 m Freestyle Relay	7:10.46	2 Q			7:10.92	7
Ryosuke Irie; Kosuke Kitajima; Takuro Fujii; Shogo Hihara; Ryo Tateishi*; Takeshi Matsuda*	Men's 4 × 100 m Medley Relay	3:34.82	4 Q			3:32.89	4

- * raced in heats only

Women

Athlete	Event	Heats		Semifinals		Final	
Athlete	Event	Time	Rank	Time	Rank	Time	Rank
Yayoi Matsumoto	Women's 50m Freestyle	25.34	16 Q	Withdrew		did not advance	
Natsuki Hasegawa	Women's 100m Freestyle	56.30	35	did not advance			
Haruka Ueda	Women's 200m Freestyle	1:58.74	16 Q	1:58.28	14	did not advance	
Hanae Ito	Women's 200m Freestyle	1:58.74	16*	did not advance			
Aya Terakawa	Women's 50m Backstroke	28.34	4 Q	28.16	7 Q	27.93	Silver medal
Aya Terakawa	Women's 100m Backstroke	59.95	4 Q	59.81	8 Q	59.35	5
Aya Terakawa	Women's 200m Backstroke	DNS		did not advance			
Shiho Sakai	Women's 50m Backstroke	28.89	19	did not advance			
Shiho Sakai	Women's 100m Backstroke	1:00.34	7 Q	59.94	9	did not advance	
Shiho Sakai	Women's 200m Backstroke	2:09.25	8 Q	2:08.93	11	did not advance	
Satomi Suzuki	Women's 50m Breaststroke	DNS		did not advance			
Satomi Suzuki	Women's 100m Breaststroke	1:07.39	4 Q	1:07.68	9	did not advance	
Satomi Suzuki	Women's 200m Breaststroke	2:27.98	18	did not advance			
Rie Kaneto	Women's 100m Breaststroke	1:09.56	24	did not advance			
Rie Kaneto	Women's 200m Breaststroke	2:27.17	10 Q	2:25.41	4 Q	2:25.36	5
Yuka Kato	Women's 50m Butterfly	26.37	9 Q	26.07	5 Q		
Yuka Kato	Women's 100m Butterfly	58.70	13 Q	58.71	14	did not advance	
Natsumi Hoshi	Women's 100m Butterfly	59.63	25	did not advance			
Natsumi Hoshi	Women's 200m Butterfly	2:07.34	1 Q	2:06.65	2 Q	2:05.91	4
Haruka Ueda; Yayoi Matsumoto; Hanae Ito; Natsuki Hasegawa	Women's 4 × 100 m Freestyle Relay	3:39.28	7 Q			3:39.55	7
Haruka Ueda; Hanae Ito; Yayoi Matsumoto; Misaki Yamaguchi	Women's 4 × 200 m Freestyle Relay	7:57.82	9			did not advance	
Aya Terakawa; Satomi Suzuki; Yuka Kato; Yayoi Matsumoto; Haruka Ueda**	Women's 4 × 100 m Medley Relay	4:00.08	6 Q			3:57.84	5

- * lost play-off race against Haruka Ueda
- ** raced in heats only

== Synchronized swimming ==
Japan has qualified 11 athletes in synchronised swimming.

Women

Athlete	Event	Preliminary		Final	
Athlete	Event	Points	Rank	Points	Rank
Yumi Adachi	Solo Technical Routine	91.900	5 Q	92.600	5
Yumi Adachi	Solo Free Routine	92.620	5 Q	92.810	5
Yukiko Inui; Chisa Kobayashi	Duet Technical Routine	92.600	5 Q	92.800	5
Yukiko Inui; Chisa Kobayashi	Duet Free Routine	92.720	5 Q	92.710	5
Yumi Adachi; Aika Hakoyama; Yukiko Inui; Mayo Itoyama; Chisa Kobayashi; Mai Nakamura; Mariko Sakai; Kurumi Yoshida	Team Technical Routine	92.800	5 Q	93.100	5
Yumi Adachi; Aika Hakoyama; Yukiko Inui; Chisa Kobayashi; Risako Mitsui; Mai Nakamura; Mariko Sakai; Kurumi Yoshida	Team Free Routine	92.540	5 Q	92.860	5

Reserves

- Miho Arai
- Yuma Kawai

== Water polo ==
=== Men ===
Team Roster

- Katsuyuki Tanamura
- Kan Aoyagi – Captain
- Koji Takei
- Shota Hazui
- Mitsuaki Shiga
- Akira Yanase
- Yusuke Shimizu
- Atsushi Naganuma
- Hiroki Wakamatsu
- Yoshinori Shiota
- Keigo Okawa
- Satoshi Nagata
- Naoki Shimizu

==== Group C ====
Team	Pld	W	D	L	GF	GA	GD	Pts
Croatia	3	3	0	0	43	16	+27	6
Canada	3	2	0	1	28	25	+3	4
Japan	3	1	0	2	25	40	–15	2
Brazil	3	0	0	3	25	40	–15	0

July 18, 2011; 17:00	Report	Japan	5–11	Canada	Shanghai Oriental Sports Center, Shanghai; Attendance: 700; Referees: Williams (NZL), Alexandrescu (ROU)
July 18, 2011; 17:00	Report	Score by quarters: 1–3, 2–2, 0–3, 2–3			Shanghai Oriental Sports Center, Shanghai; Attendance: 700; Referees: Williams (NZL), Alexandrescu (ROU)
July 18, 2011; 17:00	Report	five players 1	Goals	Graham 5	Shanghai Oriental Sports Center, Shanghai; Attendance: 700; Referees: Williams (NZL), Alexandrescu (ROU)

July 20, 2011; 12:10	Report	Brazil	11–13	Japan	Shanghai Oriental Sports Center, Shanghai; Attendance: 500; Referees: Brgulian (MNE), Ni (CHN)
July 20, 2011; 12:10	Report	Score by quarters: 4–2, 2–4, 1–3, 4–4			Shanghai Oriental Sports Center, Shanghai; Attendance: 500; Referees: Brgulian (MNE), Ni (CHN)
July 20, 2011; 12:10	Report	Silva, Franco 3	Goals	Shimizu 4	Shanghai Oriental Sports Center, Shanghai; Attendance: 500; Referees: Brgulian (MNE), Ni (CHN)

July 22, 2011; 10:50	Report	Japan	7–18	Croatia	Shanghai Oriental Sports Center, Shanghai; Attendance: 500; Referees: Ni (CHN), Balfanvayev (KAZ)
July 22, 2011; 10:50	Report	Score by quarters: 1–6, 1–3, 2–4, 3–5			Shanghai Oriental Sports Center, Shanghai; Attendance: 500; Referees: Ni (CHN), Balfanvayev (KAZ)
July 22, 2011; 10:50	Report	three players 2	Goals	Joković 3	Shanghai Oriental Sports Center, Shanghai; Attendance: 500; Referees: Ni (CHN), Balfanvayev (KAZ)

==== Playoff round ====
July 24, 2011; 21:00	Report	Japan	6–8	Germany	Shanghai Oriental Sports Center, Shanghai; Attendance: 550; Referees: Peris (CRO), Cabral (BRA)
July 24, 2011; 21:00	Report	Score by quarters: 3–3, 0–1, 2–3, 1–1			Shanghai Oriental Sports Center, Shanghai; Attendance: 550; Referees: Peris (CRO), Cabral (BRA)
July 24, 2011; 21:00	Report	Shimizu 4	Goals	Stamm 3	Shanghai Oriental Sports Center, Shanghai; Attendance: 550; Referees: Peris (CRO), Cabral (BRA)

==== Classification 9–12 ====
July 26, 2011; 12:40	Report	Australia	15–9	Japan	Shanghai Oriental Sports Center, Shanghai; Referees: Ciric (SRB), Ni (CHN)
July 26, 2011; 12:40	Report	Score by quarters: 6–4, 1–1, 3–1, 5–3			Shanghai Oriental Sports Center, Shanghai; Referees: Ciric (SRB), Ni (CHN)
July 26, 2011; 12:40	Report	three players 3	Goals	Takei 3	Shanghai Oriental Sports Center, Shanghai; Referees: Ciric (SRB), Ni (CHN)

==== Eleventh place game ====
July 28, 2011; 09:30	Report	Romania	15–18	Japan	Shanghai Oriental Sports Center, Shanghai; Attendance: 200; Referees: Reemnet (NED), Bock (GER)
July 28, 2011; 09:30	Report	Score by quarters: 4–3, 3–5, 3–5, 5–5			Shanghai Oriental Sports Center, Shanghai; Attendance: 200; Referees: Reemnet (NED), Bock (GER)
July 28, 2011; 09:30	Report	Kadar 4	Goals	Shiota 8	Shanghai Oriental Sports Center, Shanghai; Attendance: 200; Referees: Reemnet (NED), Bock (GER)

== Medal table ==
Rank	Nation	Gold	Silver	Bronze	Total
Totals (0 entries)		0	0	0	0
