= Synchronised swimming at the 2011 World Aquatics Championships – Solo technical routine =

The Solo technical routine competition of the Synchronised swimming events at the 2011 World Aquatics Championships was held on July 17 with the preliminary round held in the morning and the final in the evening session.

== Medalists ==
Gold	Silver	Bronze
Natalia Ishchenko; Russia	Huang Xuechen; China	Andrea Fuentes; Spain

== Results ==
The preliminary round was held at 09:00 local time. The final was held at 17:15.

Green denotes finalists

Rank	Diver	Nationality	Preliminary		Final	
Rank	Diver	Nationality	Points	Rank	Points	Rank
Gold medal	Natalia Ishchenko	Russia	97.900	1	98.300	1
Silver medal	Huang Xuechen	China	95.500	2	96.500	2
Bronze medal	Andrea Fuentes	Spain	94.600	3	95.300	3
4	Marie-Pier Boudreau Gagnon	Canada	93.600	4	94.500	4
5	Yumi Adachi	Japan	91.900	5	92.600	5
6	Lolita Ananasova	Ukraine	89.600	6	90.700	6
7	Despoina Solomou	Greece	89.200	7	89.400	7
8	Jenna Randall	Great Britain	89.100	8	89.000	8
9	Linda Cerruti	Italy	88.400	9	88.300	9
10	Anastasia Gloushkov	Israel	87.700	10	87.500	10
11	Mary Killman	United States	87.700	10	87.100	11
12	Wang Ok-Gyong	North Korea	87.300	12	86.600	12
13	Anna Kulkina	Kazakhstan	83.400	13		
14	Park Hyun-Ha	South Korea	83.300	14		
15	Giovana Stephan	Brazil	82.900	15		
16	Nadine Brandl	Austria	82.500	16		
17	Eszter Czékus	Hungary	78.400	17		
17	Etel Sánchez	Argentina	78.400	17		
19	Kalina Yordanova	Bulgaria	77.000	19		
20	Anastasiya Ruzmetova	Uzbekistan	76.100	20		
21	Kristina Krajcovicova	Slovakia	75.700	21		
22	Asly Alegria	Colombia	75.600	22		
23	Greisy Gomez	Venezuela	74.700	23		
23	Katrina Ann	Malaysia	74.700	23		
25	Elena Tini	San Marino	74.500	25		
26	Jomana Mohamed Khaled	Egypt	73.400	26		
27	Tuğçe Tanış	Turkey	73.000	27		
28	Violeta Mitinian	Costa Rica	69.300	28		
29	Kirstin Anderson	New Zealand	68.800	29		
30	Nantaya Polsen	Thailand	67.900	30		
31	Barbara Luna	Cuba	67.500	31		
32	Adela Amanda Nirmala	Indonesia	66.000	32		
33	Laura Strugnell	South Africa	61.800	33		
