= Hungary at the 2011 World Aquatics Championships =

- Flag of Hungary
- World Aquatics code: HUN
- National federation: Magyar Úszó Szövetség
- Website: www.musz.hu

in Shanghai, China
- Competitors: 50 in 5 sports
- Medals Ranked 14th: Gold 1 Silver 0 Bronze 4 Total 5

World Aquatics Championships appearances (overview)
- 1973; 1975; 1978; 1982; 1986; 1991; 1994; 1998; 2001; 2003; 2005; 2007; 2009; 2011; 2013; 2015; 2017; 2019; 2022; 2023; 2024; 2025

Hungary competed at the 2011 World Aquatics Championships in Shanghai, China between July 16 and 31, 2011. 50 competitors, 25 men and 25 women took part.

== Medalists ==
Medal	Name	Sport	Event	Date
Gold	Dániel Gyurta	Swimming	Men's 200m Breaststroke	29 July
Bronze	Csaba Gercsák	Open water swimming	Men's 25km	23 July
Bronze	Gergő Kis	Swimming	Men's 800m Freestyle	27 July
Bronze	Gergő Kis	Swimming	Men's 1500m Freestyle	31 July
Bronze	László Cseh	Swimming	Men's 200m Medley	28 July

== Diving ==
Hungary has qualified 3 athletes in diving. Nóra Barta has also qualified but withdrew due to injury.

Women

Athlete	Event	Preliminary		Semifinals		Final	
Athlete	Event	Points	Rank	Points	Rank	Points	Rank
Flóra Gondos	Women's 3m Springboard	244.65	32	Did not advance			
Villő Kormos	Women's 10m Platform	233.75	29	Did not advance			
Flóra Gondos; Zsófia Reisinger	Women's 3m Synchro Springboard	241.38	14			Did not advance	
Villő Kormos; Zsófia Reisinger	Women's 10m Synchro Platform	244.68	13			Did not advance	

== Open water swimming ==
Hungary has qualified 3 athletes in open water swimming. One of them, Éva Risztov also competed in swimming.

Men

Athlete	Event	Time	Position
Csaba Gercsák	Men's 5km	56:30.1	10
Csaba Gercsák	Men's 10km	1:56:58.9	35
Csaba Gercsák	Men's 25km	5:11:18.1	Bronze medal
Gergely Kutasi	Men's 10km	2:02:17.2	44
Gergely Kutasi	Men's 25km	Did not finish	

Women

Athlete	Event	Time	Position
Éva Risztov	Women's 10km	Disqualified	

== Swimming ==
Hungary has qualified 17 athletes in swimming.

Men

Athlete	Event	Heat		Semifinal		Final	
Athlete	Event	Time	Rank	Time	Rank	Time	Rank
Krisztián Takács	Men's 50m Freestyle	22.15	5 Q	21.97	4 Q	21.99	6
Dominik Kozma	Men's 50m Freestyle	22.36	19	Did not advance			
Dominik Kozma	Men's 100m Freestyle	49.49	27	Did not advance			
Gergő Kis	Men's 400m Freestyle	3:47.26	10			Did not advance	
Gergő Kis	Men's 800m Freestyle	7:48.33	4 Q			7:44.94	Bronze medal
Gergő Kis	Men's 1500m Freestyle	14:52.72	2 Q			14:45.66	Bronze medal
Gergely Gyurta	Men's 800m Freestyle	8:06.14	25			Did not advance	
Gergely Gyurta	Men's 1500m Freestyle	15:22.50	20			Did not advance	
Péter Bernek	Men's 100m Backstroke	55.32	34	Did not advance			
Péter Bernek	Men's 200m Backstroke	1:57.23	2 Q	1:58.14	10	Did not advance	
Dániel Gyurta	Men's 100m Breaststroke	1:00.40	11 Q	1:00.23	7 Q	1:00.25	6
Dániel Gyurta	Men's 200m Breaststroke	2:10.78	4 Q	2:08.92	2 Q	2:08.41	Gold medal
Ákos Molnár	Men's 100m Breaststroke	1:02.11	41	Did not advance			
Ákos Molnár	Men's 200m Breaststroke	2:12.78	16 Q	2:12.07	13	Did not advance	
László Cseh	Men's 100m Butterfly	52.40	11 Q	52.18	9	Did not advance	
László Cseh	Men's 200m Butterfly	1:56.39	8 Q	1:56.32	12	Did not advance	
László Cseh	Men's 200m Medley	1:59.80	13 Q	1:57.66	3 Q	1:57.69	Bronze medal
László Cseh	Men's 400m Medley	4:22.26	22			Did not advance	
Bence Biczó	Men's 200m Butterfly	1:55.71	3 Q	1:55.35	6 Q	1:55.53	8
Dávid Verrasztó	Men's 200m Medley	1:58.69	2 Q	2:00.05	15	Did not advance	
Dávid Verrasztó	Men's 400m Medley	4:15.01	5 Q			4:15.67	6
Péter Bernek; Dániel Gyurta; Bence Biczó; Dominik Kozma	Men's 4x100m Medley	3:38.24	15			Did not advance	

Women

Athlete	Event	Heat		Semifinal		Final	
Athlete	Event	Time	Rank	Time	Rank	Time	Rank
Evelyn Verrasztó	Women's 100m Freestyle	55.76	30	Did not advance			
Evelyn Verrasztó	Women's 200m Freestyle	1:58.27	14 Q	1:59.71	16	Did not advance	
Evelyn Verrasztó	Women's 200m Backstroke	DNS		Did not advance			
Evelyn Verrasztó	Women's 200m Medley	2:13.33	12 Q	2:12.51	11	Did not advance	
Ágnes Mutina	Women's 200m Freestyle	1:57.40	4 Q	1:57.53	9	Did not advance	
Boglárka Kapás	Women's 400m Freestyle	4:09.15	14			Did not advance	
Boglárka Kapás	Women's 800m Freestyle	8:28.40	6 Q			8:24.79	5
Éva Risztov	Women's 800m Freestyle	8:29.16	12			Did not advance	
Éva Risztov	Women's 1500m Freestyle	16:22.60	11			Did not advance	
Eszter Dara	Women's 50m Butterfly	27.53	27	Did not advance			
Eszter Dara	Women's 100m Butterfly	1:00.69	36	Did not advance			
Katinka Hosszú	Women's 200m Butterfly	2:10.06	19	Did not advance			
Katinka Hosszú	Women's 200m Medley	2:11.53	3 Q	2:11.71	7 Q	2:11.24	6
Katinka Hosszú	Women's 400m Medley	4:42.96	15			Did not advance	
Zsuzsanna Jakabos	Women's 200m Butterfly	2:07.60	2 Q	2:06.77	5 Q	2:06.35	6
Zsuzsanna Jakabos	Women's 400m Medley	4:38.84	10			Did not advance	
Ágnes Mutina; Evelyn Verrasztó; Katinka Hosszú; Zsuzsanna Jakabos	Women's 4x200m Freestyle	7:52.12	3 Q			7:52.39	5

== Synchronised swimming ==
Hungary qualified 2 athletes in synchronised swimming.

Women

Athlete	Event	Preliminary		Final	
Athlete	Event	Points	Rank	Points	Rank
Eszter Czékus	Solo Technical	78.400	17	Did not advance	
Szofi Kiss	Solo Free	79.340	17	Did not advance	
Eszter Czékus; Szofi Kiss	Duet Technical	82.300	21	Did not advance	
Eszter Czékus; Szofi Kiss	Duet Free	79.690	24	Did not advance	

== Water polo ==
Hungary has qualified for both the men's and the women's tournaments.

=== Men ===
Team Roster

- Viktor Nagy
- Miklós Gór-Nagy
- Norbert Madaras
- Dénes Varga
- Márton Szivós
- Norbert Hosnyánszky
- Gergely Kiss
- Zsolt Varga
- Dániel Varga
- Péter Biros – Captain
- Ádám Steinmetz
- Balázs Hárai
- Zoltán Szécsi

==== Group A ====
Qualified for the quarterfinals
Qualified for the playoff round
Advance to placement matches

Team	Played	W	D	L	GF	GA	GD	Pts
Hungary	3	3	0	0	39	26	+13	6
Montenegro	3	2	0	1	35	23	+12	4
Spain	3	1	0	2	36	26	+10	2
Kazakhstan	3	0	0	3	15	50	–35	0

July 18, 2011; 09:30	Report	Hungary	11–10	Montenegro	Shanghai Oriental Sports Center, Shanghai; Attendance: 600; Referees: Naumov (RUS), Tulga (TUR)
July 18, 2011; 09:30	Report	Score by quarters: 2–3, 3–2, 2–4, 4–1			Shanghai Oriental Sports Center, Shanghai; Attendance: 600; Referees: Naumov (RUS), Tulga (TUR)
July 18, 2011; 09:30	Report	Biros 4	Goals	Janović, Ivović 2	Shanghai Oriental Sports Center, Shanghai; Attendance: 600; Referees: Naumov (RUS), Tulga (TUR)

July 20, 2011; 19:40	Report	Hungary	16–5	Kazakhstan	Shanghai Oriental Sports Center, Shanghai; Attendance: 600; Referees: Peris (CRO), Deslieres (CAN)
July 20, 2011; 19:40	Report	Score by quarters: 4–1, 4–0, 3–2, 5–2			Shanghai Oriental Sports Center, Shanghai; Attendance: 600; Referees: Peris (CRO), Deslieres (CAN)
July 20, 2011; 19:40	Report	four players 3	Goals	Zhilyayev 2	Shanghai Oriental Sports Center, Shanghai; Attendance: 600; Referees: Peris (CRO), Deslieres (CAN)

July 22, 2011; 17:00	Report	Hungary	12–11	Spain	Shanghai Oriental Sports Center, Shanghai; Attendance: 650; Referees: Peris (CRO), Koganov (AZE)
July 22, 2011; 17:00	Report	Score by quarters: 5–5, 4–3, 2–1, 1–2			Shanghai Oriental Sports Center, Shanghai; Attendance: 650; Referees: Peris (CRO), Koganov (AZE)
July 22, 2011; 17:00	Report	Madaras, Hárai 3	Goals	Vargas 3	Shanghai Oriental Sports Center, Shanghai; Attendance: 650; Referees: Peris (CRO), Koganov (AZE)

==== Quarterfinals ====
July 26, 2011; 14:00	Report	Hungary	9–8	United States	Shanghai Oriental Sports Center, Shanghai; Attendance: 450; Referees: Koryzna (POL), Flahive (AUS)
July 26, 2011; 14:00	Report	Score by quarters: 1–3, 3–2, 3–2, 2–1			Shanghai Oriental Sports Center, Shanghai; Attendance: 450; Referees: Koryzna (POL), Flahive (AUS)
July 26, 2011; 14:00	Report	three players 2	Goals	Varellas, Bailey 3	Shanghai Oriental Sports Center, Shanghai; Attendance: 450; Referees: Koryzna (POL), Flahive (AUS)

==== Semifinals ====
July 28, 2011; 16:50	Report	Hungary	14–15 (OT)	Serbia	Shanghai Oriental Sports Center, Shanghai; Attendance: 1,200; Referees: Margeta (SLO), Stavridis (GRE)
July 28, 2011; 16:50	Report	Score by quarters: 2–1, 7–5, 3–3, 1–4 OT: 1–2			Shanghai Oriental Sports Center, Shanghai; Attendance: 1,200; Referees: Margeta (SLO), Stavridis (GRE)
July 28, 2011; 16:50	Report	Madaras 4	Goals	Filipović, Prlainović 3	Shanghai Oriental Sports Center, Shanghai; Attendance: 1,200; Referees: Margeta (SLO), Stavridis (GRE)

==== Bronze medal game ====
July 30, 2011; 16:00	Report	Hungary	11–12	Croatia	Shanghai Oriental Sports Center, Shanghai; Attendance: 1,200; Referees: Borrell (ESP), Stavridis (GRE)
July 30, 2011; 16:00	Report	Score by quarters: 2–5, 2–3, 5–3, 2–1			Shanghai Oriental Sports Center, Shanghai; Attendance: 1,200; Referees: Borrell (ESP), Stavridis (GRE)
July 30, 2011; 16:00	Report	Varga, Biros 3	Goals	Bošković 4	Shanghai Oriental Sports Center, Shanghai; Attendance: 1,200; Referees: Borrell (ESP), Stavridis (GRE)

=== Women ===
Team Roster

- Orsolya Kasó
- Dóra Czigány
- Dóra Antal
- Anna Illés
- Gabriella Szűcs
- Orsolya Takács
- Rita Drávucz – Captain
- Rita Keszthelyi
- Ildikó Tóth
- Barbara Bujka
- Rita Poszkoli
- Katalin Menczinger
- Edina Gangl

==== Group A ====
Qualified for the quarterfinals
Qualified for the playoff round
Advance to placement matches

Team	Pld	W	D	L	GF	GA	GD	Pts
United States	3	2	1	0	37	18	+19	5
Netherlands	3	1	2	0	29	19	+10	4
Hungary	3	1	1	1	37	31	+6	3
Kazakhstan	3	0	0	3	13	48	−35	0

July 17, 2011; 10:50	Report	Kazakhstan	6–21	Hungary	Shanghai Oriental Sports Center, Shanghai; Attendance: 700; Referees: Ni (CHN), Tulga (TUR)
July 17, 2011; 10:50	Report	Score by quarters: 3–5, 0–6, 3–6, 0–4			Shanghai Oriental Sports Center, Shanghai; Attendance: 700; Referees: Ni (CHN), Tulga (TUR)
July 17, 2011; 10:50	Report	Vassilyeva, Gritsenko 2	Goals	Keszthelyi 5	Shanghai Oriental Sports Center, Shanghai; Attendance: 700; Referees: Ni (CHN), Tulga (TUR)

July 19, 2011; 18:20	Report	Hungary	7–16	United States	Shanghai Oriental Sports Center, Shanghai; Attendance: 650; Referees: Bock (GER), Naumov (RUS)
July 19, 2011; 18:20	Report	Score by quarters: 2–3, 2–4, 3–5, 0–4			Shanghai Oriental Sports Center, Shanghai; Attendance: 650; Referees: Bock (GER), Naumov (RUS)
July 19, 2011; 18:20	Report	Szűcs 3	Goals	Mathewson 3	Shanghai Oriental Sports Center, Shanghai; Attendance: 650; Referees: Bock (GER), Naumov (RUS)

July 21, 2011; 13:30	Report	Netherlands	9–9	Hungary	Shanghai Oriental Sports Center, Shanghai; Attendance: 300; Referees: Caputi (ITA), Williams (NZL)
July 21, 2011; 13:30	Report	Score by quarters: 3–1, 0–0, 3–3, 3–5			Shanghai Oriental Sports Center, Shanghai; Attendance: 300; Referees: Caputi (ITA), Williams (NZL)
July 21, 2011; 13:30	Report	Cabout, van Belkum 4	Goals	Bujka 3	Shanghai Oriental Sports Center, Shanghai; Attendance: 300; Referees: Caputi (ITA), Williams (NZL)

==== Playoff round ====
July 23, 2011; 15:30	Report	Hungary	9–10	Australia	Shanghai Oriental Sports Center, Shanghai; Attendance: 900; Referees: Margeta (SLO), Borrell (ESP)
July 23, 2011; 15:30	Report	Score by quarters: 2–3, 2–2, 1–3, 4–2			Shanghai Oriental Sports Center, Shanghai; Attendance: 900; Referees: Margeta (SLO), Borrell (ESP)
July 23, 2011; 15:30	Report	four players 2	Goals	Webster 4	Shanghai Oriental Sports Center, Shanghai; Attendance: 900; Referees: Margeta (SLO), Borrell (ESP)

==== Classification 9–12 ====
July 25, 2011; 12:40	Report	Hungary	17–13	Spain	Shanghai Oriental Sports Center, Shanghai; Attendance: 450; Referees: Deslieres (CAN), Wengenroth (SUI)
July 25, 2011; 12:40	Report	Score by quarters: 5–3, 5–3, 4–3, 3–4			Shanghai Oriental Sports Center, Shanghai; Attendance: 450; Referees: Deslieres (CAN), Wengenroth (SUI)
July 25, 2011; 12:40	Report	Bujka 5	Goals	Gil Sorli 5	Shanghai Oriental Sports Center, Shanghai; Attendance: 450; Referees: Deslieres (CAN), Wengenroth (SUI)

==== Ninth place game ====
July 27, 2011; 10:50	Report	Cuba	7–12	Hungary	Shanghai Oriental Sports Center, Shanghai; Attendance: 250; Referees: Wengenroth (SUI), Rotsart (USA)
July 27, 2011; 10:50	Report	Score by quarters: 2–4, 3–2, 0–5, 2–1			Shanghai Oriental Sports Center, Shanghai; Attendance: 250; Referees: Wengenroth (SUI), Rotsart (USA)
July 27, 2011; 10:50	Report	Hernandez Consuegra, Gutierrez More 3	Goals	Czigány 3	Shanghai Oriental Sports Center, Shanghai; Attendance: 250; Referees: Wengenroth (SUI), Rotsart (USA)
