= Brazil at the 2011 World Aquatics Championships =

- Flag of Brazil
- World Aquatics code: BRA
- National federation: Confederação Brasileira de Desportos Aquáticos
- Website: www.cbda.org.br

in Shanghai, China
- Medals Ranked 4th: Gold 4 Silver 0 Bronze 0 Total 4

World Aquatics Championships appearances (overview)
- 1973; 1975; 1978; 1982; 1986; 1991; 1994; 1998; 2001; 2003; 2005; 2007; 2009; 2011; 2013; 2015; 2017; 2019; 2022; 2023; 2024; 2025

Brazil competed at the 2011 World Aquatics Championships in Shanghai, China between July 16 and 31, 2011.

== Medalists ==
Medal	Name	Sport	Event	Date
Gold	Ana Marcela Cunha	Open Water Swimming	Women's 25km	23 July
Gold	César Cielo Filho	Swimming	Men's 50m Butterfly	25 July
Gold	Felipe França Silva	Swimming	Men's 50m Breaststroke	27 July
Gold	César Cielo Filho	Swimming	Men's 50m Freestyle	30 July

== Diving ==
Brazil has qualified 3 athletes in diving.

Men

Athlete	Event	Preliminary		Semifinals		Final	
Athlete	Event	Points	Rank	Points	Rank	Points	Rank
César Castro	Men's 3m Springboard	388.05	23	did not advance			
Rui Marinho	Men's 10m Platform	326.10	31	did not advance			
Hugo Parisi	Men's 10m Platform	434.15	12 Q	414.90	14	did not advance	
Rui Marinho; Hugo Parisi	Men's 10m Synchro Platform	347.01	14			did not advance	

== Open water swimming ==
Men

Athlete	Event	Final	
Athlete	Event	Time	Position
Victor Colonese	Men's 5km	56:39.7	22
Samuel de Bona	Men's 5km	1:01:20.9	36
Samuel de Bona	Men's 10km	2:02:17.2	44
Samuel de Bona	Men's 25km	5:27:38.1	16
Allan do Carmo	Men's 10km	2:05:42.4	50
Allan do Carmo	Men's 25km	5:11:32.2	6

Women

Athlete	Event	Final	
Athlete	Event	Time	Position
Poliana Okimoto	Women's 5km	1:00:48.3	11
Poliana Okimoto	Women's 10km	2:02:13.6	6
Ana Marcela Cunha	Women's 5km	1:00:46.7	7
Ana Marcela Cunha	Women's 10km	2:02:22.2	11
Ana Marcela Cunha	Women's 25km	5:29:22.9	Gold medal

== Swimming ==
Brazil qualified 21 swimmers.

Men

Athlete	Event	Heats		Semifinals		Final	
Athlete	Event	Time	Rank	Time	Rank	Time	Rank
Bruno Fratus	Men's 50m Freestyle	22.26	13 Q	21.76	1 Q	21.96	5
Bruno Fratus	Men's 100m Freestyle	49.23	24	did not advance			
César Cielo Filho	Men's 50m Freestyle	22.03	1 Q	21.79	2 Q	21.52	Gold medal
César Cielo Filho	Men's 100m Freestyle	48.41	4 Q	48.34	5 Q	48.01	4
César Cielo Filho	Men's 50m Butterfly	23.26	1 Q	23.19	1 Q	23.10	Gold medal
Nicolas Oliveira	Men's 200m Freestyle	1:48.33	15 Q	1:48.18	13	did not advance	
Guilherme Guido	Men's 50m Backstroke	25.58	19	did not advance			
Guilherme Guido	Men's 100m Backstroke	54.93	27	did not advance			
Felipe França Silva	Men's 50m Breaststroke	27.19	1 Q	26.95	2 Q	27.01	Gold medal
Felipe França Silva	Men's 100m Breaststroke	1:00.01	4 Q	1:00.73	14	did not advance	
Felipe Lima	Men's 100m Breaststroke	1:01.37	24	did not advance			
Kaio de Almeida	Men's 100m Butterfly	53.20	25	did not advance			
Kaio de Almeida	Men's 200m Butterfly	1:56.92	14 Q	1:56.06	10	did not advance	
Leonardo de Deus	Men's 200m Backstroke	1:58.29	13	1:59.77	15	did not advance	
Leonardo de Deus	Men's 200m Butterfly	1:55.55	2 Q	1:57.58	13	did not advance	
Thiago Pereira	Men's 100m Backstroke	54.47	18	did not advance			
Thiago Pereira	Men's 200m Medley	1:57.82	1 Q	1:58.27	5 Q	1:59.00	6
Thiago Pereira	Men's 400m Medley	did not start					
Henrique Rodrigues	Men's 200m Medley	1:59.54	10 Q	2:00.04	14	did not advance	
Bruno Fratus; Nicolas Oliveira; Marcos Macedo; Marcelo Chierighini	Men's 4 x 100m Freestyle Relay	3:16.28	9			did not advance	
Nicolas Oliveira; André Schultz; Rodrigo Castro; João de Lucca	Men's 4 x 200m Freestyle Relay	7:18.44	14			did not advance	
Guilherme Guido; Felipe França Silva; Kaio de Almeida; Bruno Fratus	Men's 4 x 100m Medley Relay	3:36.99	14			did not advance	

Women

Athlete	Event	Heats		Semifinals		Final	
Athlete	Event	Time	Rank	Time	Rank	Time	Rank
Flávia Delaroli	Women's 50m Freestyle	25.47	18	did not advance			
Tatiana Lemos	Women's 100m Freestyle	55.55	25	did not advance			
Etiene Medeiros	Women's 50m Backstroke	29.16	25	did not advance			
Etiene Medeiros	Women's 100m Backstroke	1:05.18	43	did not advance			
Carolina Mussi	Women's 100m Breaststroke	1:13.66	36	did not advance			
Daynara de Paula	Women's 50m Butterfly	26.60	14 Q	26.39	10	did not advance	
Daynara de Paula	Women's 100m Butterfly	59.24	21	did not advance			
Tatiana Lemos; Daynara de Paula; Flávia Delaroli; Michelle Lenhardt	Women's 4 x 100m Freestyle Relay	3:44.62	13			did not advance	
Etiene Medeiros; Carolina Mussi; Daynara de Paula; Tatiana Lemos	Women's 4 x 100m Medley Relay	4:14.52	17			did not advance	

== Synchronised swimming ==
Brazil has qualified 10 athletes in synchronised swimming.

Women

Athlete	Event	Preliminary		Final	
Athlete	Event	Points	Rank	Points	Rank
Giovana Stephan	Solo Technical Routine	82.900	15	did not advance	
Giovana Stephan	Solo Free Routine	84.390	14	did not advance	
Nayara Figueira; Lara Teixeira	Duet Technical Routine	87.400	12 Q	86.000	12
Nayara Figueira; Lara Teixeira	Duet Free Routine	86.520	12 Q	85.770	12
Maria Bruno; Maria Eduarda Pereira; Nayara Figueira; Michelle Frota; Lorena Molinos; Pâmela Nogueira; Giovana Stephan; Lara Teixeira	Team Technical Routine	86.200	11 Q	85.600	12
Maria Bruno; Joseana Costa; Nayara Figueira; Michelle Frota; Lorena Molinos; Pâmela Nogueira; Giovana Stephan; Lara Teixeira	Team Free Routine	85.770	11 Q	85.160	12

Reserves

- Jessica Goncalves

== Water polo ==
=== Men ===
Team Roster

- Marcelo Chagas
- Emilio Vieira
- Henrique Miranda
- Bernardo Gomes
- Marcelo Franco
- Gustavo Guimarães
- Jonas Crivella
- Felipe Silva – Captain
- Bernardo Rocha
- Joao Felipe Coelho
- Danilo Correa
- Vinicius Antonelli

==== Group C ====
Team	Pld	W	D	L	GF	GA	GD	Pts
Croatia	3	3	0	0	43	16	+27	6
Canada	3	2	0	1	28	25	+3	4
Japan	3	1	0	2	25	40	–15	2
Brazil	3	0	0	3	25	40	–15	0

July 18, 2011; 13:30	Report	Brazil	5–14	Croatia	Shanghai Oriental Sports Center, Shanghai; Attendance: 250; Referees: Gonzalez (PUR), Ciric (SRB)
July 18, 2011; 13:30	Report	Score by quarters: 0–5, 1–3, 3–4, 1–2			Shanghai Oriental Sports Center, Shanghai; Attendance: 250; Referees: Gonzalez (PUR), Ciric (SRB)
July 18, 2011; 13:30	Report	Crivella 2	Goals	Bošković 4	Shanghai Oriental Sports Center, Shanghai; Attendance: 250; Referees: Gonzalez (PUR), Ciric (SRB)

July 20, 2011; 12:10	Report	Brazil	11–13	Japan	Shanghai Oriental Sports Center, Shanghai; Attendance: 500; Referees: Brgulian (MNE), Ni (CHN)
July 20, 2011; 12:10	Report	Score by quarters: 4–2, 2–4, 1–3, 4–4			Shanghai Oriental Sports Center, Shanghai; Attendance: 500; Referees: Brgulian (MNE), Ni (CHN)
July 20, 2011; 12:10	Report	Silva, Franco 3	Goals	Shimizu 4	Shanghai Oriental Sports Center, Shanghai; Attendance: 500; Referees: Brgulian (MNE), Ni (CHN)

July 22, 2011; 9:30	Report	Brazil	9–13	Canada	Shanghai Oriental Sports Center, Shanghai; Attendance: 400; Referees: Brgulian (MNE), Flahive (AUS)
July 22, 2011; 9:30	Report	Score by quarters: 1–2, 1–4, 3–4, 4–3			Shanghai Oriental Sports Center, Shanghai; Attendance: 400; Referees: Brgulian (MNE), Flahive (AUS)
July 22, 2011; 9:30	Report	Guimarães 3	Goals	Diggle 5	Shanghai Oriental Sports Center, Shanghai; Attendance: 400; Referees: Brgulian (MNE), Flahive (AUS)

==== Classification 13–16 ====
July 24, 2011; 10:50	Report	Brazil	7–4	South Africa	Shanghai Oriental Sports Center, Shanghai; Attendance: 700; Referees: Juhaz (HUN), Rustamova (UZB)
July 24, 2011; 10:50	Report	Score by quarters: 4–0, 0–1, 1–2, 2–1			Shanghai Oriental Sports Center, Shanghai; Attendance: 700; Referees: Juhaz (HUN), Rustamova (UZB)
July 24, 2011; 10:50	Report	Franco 2	Goals	Manson 2	Shanghai Oriental Sports Center, Shanghai; Attendance: 700; Referees: Juhaz (HUN), Rustamova (UZB)

==== Thirteenth place game ====
July 26, 2011; 10:00	Report	Kazakhstan	9–7	Brazil	Shanghai Oriental Sports Center, Shanghai; Attendance: 250; Referees: Pinker (RSA), Makita (JPN)
July 26, 2011; 10:00	Report	Score by quarters: 3–0, 1–3, 2–2, 3–2			Shanghai Oriental Sports Center, Shanghai; Attendance: 250; Referees: Pinker (RSA), Makita (JPN)
July 26, 2011; 10:00	Report	Zhilyayev 3	Goals	Silva 2	Shanghai Oriental Sports Center, Shanghai; Attendance: 250; Referees: Pinker (RSA), Makita (JPN)

=== Women ===
Team Roster

- Tess Flore Helene Oliveira
- Cecilia Canetti
- Izabella Maizza Chiappini
- Marina Canetti
- Marina Aranha Zablith
- Gabriela Leme Gozani
- Cristina de Camargo Beer – Captain
- Luiza Avila Carvalho
- Fernanda Palma Lissoni
- Mirella de Coutinho
- Ruda Franco
- Maria Barbara Kernebeis Amaro
- Gabriela Mantellato Dias
- Manuela Canetti

==== Group C ====
Team	Pld	W	D	L	GF	GA	GD	Pts
Greece	3	3	0	0	27	22	+5	6
Russia	3	2	0	1	38	18	+20	4
Spain	3	1	0	2	29	32	–3	2
Brazil	3	0	0	3	16	38	–22	0

July 17, 2011; 15:00	Report	Brazil	4–15	Russia	Shanghai Oriental Sports Center, Shanghai; Attendance: 600; Referees: Flahive (AUS); Koryzna (POL)
July 17, 2011; 15:00	Report	Score by quarters: 1–6, 1–2, 2–2, 0–5			Shanghai Oriental Sports Center, Shanghai; Attendance: 600; Referees: Flahive (AUS); Koryzna (POL)
July 17, 2011; 15:00	Report	four players 1	Goals	Belyaeva 4	Shanghai Oriental Sports Center, Shanghai; Attendance: 600; Referees: Flahive (AUS); Koryzna (POL)

July 19, 2011; 13:30	Report	Brazil	8–11	Greece	Shanghai Oriental Sports Center, Shanghai; Attendance: 200; Referees: Juhaz (HUN), Rotsart (USA)
July 19, 2011; 13:30	Report	Score by quarters: 2–3, 3–2, 1–3, 2–3			Shanghai Oriental Sports Center, Shanghai; Attendance: 200; Referees: Juhaz (HUN), Rotsart (USA)
July 19, 2011; 13:30	Report	eight players 1	Goals	four players 2	Shanghai Oriental Sports Center, Shanghai; Attendance: 200; Referees: Juhaz (HUN), Rotsart (USA)

July 21, 2011; 09:30	Report	Brazil	4–12	Spain	Shanghai Oriental Sports Center, Shanghai; Attendance: 450; Referees: Rustamova (UZB), Margeta Boris (SLO)
July 21, 2011; 09:30	Report	Score by quarters: 0–3, 2–4, 0–3, 2–2			Shanghai Oriental Sports Center, Shanghai; Attendance: 450; Referees: Rustamova (UZB), Margeta Boris (SLO)
July 21, 2011; 09:30	Report	Carvalho 2	Goals	Gil Sorli 5	Shanghai Oriental Sports Center, Shanghai; Attendance: 450; Referees: Rustamova (UZB), Margeta Boris (SLO)

==== Classification 13–16 ====
July 23, 2011; 10:50	Report	Brazil	10–9	South Africa	Shanghai Oriental Sports Center, Shanghai; Attendance: 550; Referees: Alexandrescu (ROU), Wengenroth (SUI)
July 23, 2011; 10:50	Report	Score by quarters: 3–2, 3–1, 2–2, 2–4			Shanghai Oriental Sports Center, Shanghai; Attendance: 550; Referees: Alexandrescu (ROU), Wengenroth (SUI)
July 23, 2011; 10:50	Report	Canetti, Carvalho 2	Goals	Harris 4	Shanghai Oriental Sports Center, Shanghai; Attendance: 550; Referees: Alexandrescu (ROU), Wengenroth (SUI)

==== Thirteenth place game ====
July 25, 2011; 10:00	Report	Kazakhstan	9–5	Brazil	Shanghai Oriental Sports Center, Shanghai; Attendance: 250; Referees: Flahive (AUS), Reemnet (NED)
July 25, 2011; 10:00	Report	Score by quarters: 2–1, 2–2, 2–0, 3–2			Shanghai Oriental Sports Center, Shanghai; Attendance: 250; Referees: Flahive (AUS), Reemnet (NED)
July 25, 2011; 10:00	Report	Vassilyeva, Chebotova 3	Goals	Zablith, Coutinho 2	Shanghai Oriental Sports Center, Shanghai; Attendance: 250; Referees: Flahive (AUS), Reemnet (NED)
