= Diving at the 2011 World Aquatics Championships – Women's 10 metre platform =

The women's 10 metre platform competition of the diving events at the 2011 World Aquatics Championships was held on July 20 with the preliminary round held in the morning and the semifinal in the evening session. The final was held on July 21.

== Medalists ==
Gold	Silver	Bronze
Chen Ruolin; China	Hu Yadan; China	Paola Espinosa; Mexico

== Results ==
The preliminary round was held on July 20 at 10:00. The semifinal was held on the same day at 14:00. The final was held on July 21 at 17:15.

Green denotes finalists

Blue denotes semifinalists

Rank	Diver	Nationality	Preliminary		Semifinal		Final	
Rank	Diver	Nationality	Points	Rank	Points	Rank	Points	Rank
1st place, gold medalist(s)	Chen Ruolin	China	370.30	2	385.95	2	405.30	1
2nd place, silver medalist(s)	Hu Yadan	China	382.25	1	403.65	1	394.00	2
3rd place, bronze medalist(s)	Paola Espinosa	Mexico	328.35	5	366.65	3	377.15	3
4	Meaghan Benfeito	Canada	336.90	3	327.70	7	375.50	4
5	Pandelela Rinong	Malaysia	330.70	4	348.70	4	355.85	5
6	Iuliia Prokopchuk	Ukraine	321.35	7	316.95	10	340.15	6
7	Alex Croak	Australia	320.50	8	330.35	6	337.75	7
8	Roseline Filion	Canada	324.20	6	326.15	8	333.00	8
9	Tonia Couch	Great Britain	317.10	9	313.35	11	315.05	9
10	Brittany Viola	United States	279.15	14	305.70	12	308.05	10
11	Yulia Koltunova	Russia	287.20	13	317.80	9	293.90	11
12	Nora Subschinski	Germany	289.50	12	331.70	5	286.30	12
13	Kim Jin-Ok	North Korea	268.15	18	304.35	13		
14	Traisy Vivien	Malaysia	274.85	16	294.35	14		
15	Jessica Parratto	United States	273.35	17	294.25	15		
16	Alejandra Orosco	Mexico	304.35	10	284.35	16		
17	Brittany Broben	Australia	276.55	15	263.95	17		
18	Mai Nakagawa	Japan	304.00	11	257.25	18		
19	Maria Kurjo	Germany	267.60	19				
20	Maria Florencia Betancourt	Venezuela	267.50	20				
21	Mara Aiacoboae	Romania	265.10	21				
22	Carolina Murillo	Colombia	262.05	22				
23	Fuka Tatsumi	Japan	261.95	23				
24	Jennifer Cowen	Great Britain	254.70	24				
25	Natalia Goncharova	Russia	254.10	25				
26	Noemi Batki	Italy	251.35	26				
27	Choe Kum-Hui	North Korea	243.20	27				
28	Sahily Martinez	Cuba	242.05	28				
29	Villő Kormos	Hungary	233.75	29				
30	Lisette Ramirez	Venezuela	217.55	30				
31	Corina Popovici	Romania	207.95	31				
32	Julia Loennegren	Sweden	200.65	32				
33	Audrey Labeau	France	98.50	33				
–	Annia Rivera	Cuba	DNS					
