= Diving at the 2011 World Aquatics Championships – Men's 10 metre platform =

The men's 10 metre platform competition of the diving events at the 2011 World Aquatics Championships was held on July 23 with the preliminary round and the semifinals and the final on 24 July.

== Medalists ==
Gold	Silver	Bronze
Qiu Bo; China	David Boudia; United States	Sascha Klein; Germany

== Results ==
The preliminary round was held on July 23 at 10:00. The semifinal was held on July 23 at 14:00. The final was held on July 24 at 16:05.

Green denotes finalists

Blue denotes semifinalists

Rank	Diver	Nationality	Preliminary		Seminfinals		Final	
Rank	Diver	Nationality	Points	Rank	Points	Rank	Points	Rank
1st place, gold medalist(s)	Qiu Bo	China	562.20	1	579.55	1	585.45	1
2nd place, silver medalist(s)	David Boudia	United States	474.80	7	486.30	4	544.25	2
3rd place, bronze medalist(s)	Sascha Klein	Germany	498.95	5	502.85	2	534.50	3
4	Victor Minibaev	Russia	507.00	4	493.55	3	527.50	4
5	Thomas Daley	Great Britain	472.70	8	467.80	6	505.10	5
6	Nick McCrory	United States	509.00	3	458.50	7	501.65	6
7	Iván García	Mexico	475.85	6	442.85	10	493.15	7
8	Oleksandr Bondar	Ukraine	423.90	14	435.60	11	457.35	8
9	Riley McCormick	Canada	434.70	11	453.30	8	444.50	9
10	Zhou Lüxin	China	528.85	2	473.75	5	441.00	10
11	Peter Waterfield	Great Britain	415.15	17	452.80	9	416.55	11
12	Kostyantyn Milyaev	Ukraine	428.75	13	419.95	12	407.50	12
13	Kazuki Murakami	Japan	448.25	9	415.10	13		
14	Hugo Parisi	Brazil	434.15	12	414.90	14		
15	Jeinkler Aguirre	Cuba	443.55	10	411.10	15		
16	Sebastián Villa	Colombia	414.25	18	409.35	16		
17	Víctor Ortega	Colombia	416.35	16	402.55	17		
18	Eric Sehn	Canada	419.10	15	388.15	18		
19	Gleb Galperin	Russia	413.10	19				
20	Martin Wolfram	Germany	412.60	20				
21	Ooi Tze Liang	Malaysia	411.90	21				
22	Christofer Eskilsson	Sweden	407.65	22				
23	Timofei Hordeichik	Belarus	375.20	23				
24	Bryan Nickson	Malaysia	371.60	24				
25	Enrique Rojas	Venezuela	361.40	25				
26	James Connor	Australia	356.60	26				
27	Francesco Dell Uomo	Italy	355.40	27				
28	Maicol Verzotto	Italy	342.15	28				
29	Edickson Contreras	Venezuela	336.00	29				
30	Muhammad Nasrullah	Indonesia	327.60	30				
31	Rui Marinho	Brazil	326.10	31				
32	Michail Tzifas	Greece	322.40	32				
33	Amund Gismervik	Norway	319.75	33				
34	Jonathan Ruvalcaba	Mexico	298.45	34				
35	Ri Hyun-Ju	North Korea	237.95	35				
36	Jose Antonio Guerra	Cuba	139.90	36				
–	Hyon Il-Myong	North Korea		DNS				
–	Sho Sakai	Japan		DNS				
