= Swimming at the 2011 World Aquatics Championships – Men's 400 metre freestyle =

Men's 400 metre freestyle at the 2011 World Aquatics Championships
- Dates: July 24, 2011 (heats and final)
- Competitors: 49 from 42 nations
- Winning time: 3:42.04

Medalists
gold medal	Park Tae-Hwan	South Korea
silver medal	Sun Yang	China
bronze medal	Paul Biedermann	Germany

The men's 400 metre freestyle competition of the swimming events at the 2011 World Aquatics Championships took place July 24. The heats and final took place on July 24.

== Records ==
Prior to the competition, the existing world and championship records were as follows.

	Name	Nation	Time	Location	Date
World record Championship record	Paul Biedermann	Germany	3:40.07	Rome	July 26, 2009

== Results ==
=== Heats ===
49 swimmers participated in 7 heats, qualified swimmers are listed:

Rank	Heat	Lane	Name	Nationality	Time	Notes
1	7	4	Sun Yang	China	3:44.87	Q
2	5	3	Peter Vanderkaay	United States	3:45.02	Q
3	5	5	Paul Biedermann	Germany	3:45.18	Q
4	6	5	Oussama Mellouli	Tunisia	3:45.90	Q
5	6	6	Sébastien Rouault	France	3:46.20	Q
6	5	4	Yannick Agnel	France	3:46.72	Q
7	6	4	Park Tae-Hwan	South Korea	3:46.74	Q
8	6	3	Ryan Cochrane	Canada	3:46.88	Q
9	7	6	Samuel Pizzetti	Italy	3:47.12	
10	6	2	Gergő Kis	Hungary	3:47.26	
11	6	1	Dai Jun	China	3:47.58	
12	7	1	Mads Glæsner	Denmark	3:48.41	
13	7	5	Ryan Napoleon	Australia	3:48.54	
14	5	6	Charlie Houchin	United States	3:48.80	
15	5	1	David Carry	Great Britain	3:48.89	
16	5	8	Heerden Herman	South Africa	3:49.55	
17	7	8	Sho Uchida	Japan	3:49.70	
18	7	7	Robert Renwick	Great Britain	3:49.91	
19	7	3	Thomas Fraser-Holmes	Australia	3:50.71	
20	4	2	Juan Martin Pereyra	Argentina	3:51.03	NR
21	7	2	Clemens Rapp	Germany	3:51.07	
22	5	7	Dominik Meichtry	Switzerland	3:51.32	
23	4	1	Cristian Quintero	Venezuela	3:52.73	
24	5	2	Nikita Lobintsev	Russia	3:53.52	
25	4	5	David Brandl	Austria	3:54.73	
26	4	3	Velimir Stjepanović	Serbia	3:54.87	
27	6	8	Sergiy Frolov	Ukraine	3:55.01	
28	3	3	Mohamed Farhoud	Egypt	3:55.32	
29	4	7	Mateo de Angulo	Colombia	3:55.92	
30	4	4	Dylan Dunlop-Barrett	New Zealand	3:56.04	
31	4	6	Mateusz Sawrymowicz	Poland	3:56.22	
32	4	8	Raul Martinez	Puerto Rico	3:58.35	
33	3	2	Sobitjon Amilov	Uzbekistan	3:59.01	
34	3	6	Mario Montoya	Costa Rica	4:00.88	
35	3	5	Sebastián Jahnsen Madico	Peru	4:00.93	
36	3	4	Irakli Revishvili	Georgia	4:02.97	
37	3	7	Pavol Jelenak	Slovakia	4:03.82	
38	3	8	Emanuele Nicolini	San Marino	4:04.38	
39	2	4	Allan Gutierrez	Honduras	4:06.56	
40	3	1	Nicholas Schwab	Dominican Republic	4:08.40	
40	6	7	Ahmed Mathlouthi	Tunisia	4:08.40	
42	2	3	Mattew Abeysinghe	Sri Lanka	4:09.45	
43	2	5	Iacovos Hadjiconstantinou	Cyprus	4:13.53	
44	2	6	Gebrel Ahmed	Palestine	4:18.40	
45	2	7	Douglas Miller	Fiji	4:20.74	
46	2	2	Heimanu Sichan	French Polynesia	4:21.24	
47	1	4	Anderson Lim	Brunei	4:34.95	
48	1	5	Ryan Govinden	Seychelles	4:55.10	
49	1	3	Chamraen Youri Maximov	Cambodia	4:55.35	

=== Final ===
The final was held at 18:13.

Rank	Lane	Name	Nationality	Time	Notes
1st place, gold medalist(s)	1	Park Tae-Hwan	South Korea	3:42.04	
2nd place, silver medalist(s)	4	Sun Yang	China	3:43.24	
3rd place, bronze medalist(s)	3	Paul Biedermann	Germany	3:44.14	
4	5	Peter Vanderkaay	United States	3:44.83	
5	8	Ryan Cochrane	Canada	3:45.17	
6	7	Yannick Agnel	France	3:45.24	
7	6	Oussama Mellouli	Tunisia	3:45.31	
8	2	Sébastien Rouault	France	3:47.66	
