= Swimming at the 2011 World Aquatics Championships – Men's 50 metre backstroke =

Men's 50 metre backstroke at the 2011 World Aquatics Championships
- Dates: July 30, 2011 (heats and semifinals); July 31, 2011 (final)
- Competitors: 43 from 38 nations
- Winning time: 24.50

Medalists
gold medal	Liam Tancock	Great Britain
silver medal	Camille Lacourt	France
bronze medal	Gerhard Zandberg	South Africa

The men's 50 metre backstroke competition of the swimming events at the 2011 World Aquatics Championships was held on July 30 with the heats and the semifinals and July 31 with the final.

== Records ==
Prior to the competition, the existing world and championship records were as follows.

	Name	Nation	Time	Location	Date
World record Championship record	Liam Tancock	United Kingdom	24.04	Rome	August 2, 2009

== Results ==
=== Heats ===
39 swimmers participated in 6 heats.

Rank	Heat	Lane	Name	Nationality	Time	Notes
1	4	5	Gerhard Zandberg	South Africa	24.72	Q
2	6	4	Camille Lacourt	France	25.03	Q
3	6	2	Helge Meeuw	Germany	25.04	Q
4	4	7	Flori Lang	Switzerland	25.12	Q
5	4	2	Aschwin Wildeboer	Spain	25.14	Q
6	6	5	Junya Koga	Japan	25.17	Q
7	4	3	Guy Barnea	Israel	25.18	Q
8	4	4	Nick Thoman	United States	25.22	Q
8	5	5	David Plummer	United States	25.22	Q
10	5	4	Liam Tancock	Great Britain	25.26	Q
10	5	1	Aristeidis Grigoriadis	Greece	25.26	Q
12	6	1	Mirco di Tora	Italy	25.28	Q
13	5	6	Hayden Stoeckel	Australia	25.29	Q
14	6	3	Ashley Delaney	Australia	25.33	Q
14	6	6	Bastiaan Lijesen	Netherlands	25.33	Q
16	5	8	Charles Francis	Canada	25.43	Q
17	5	3	Sun Xiaolei	China	25.44	
18	5	7	Cheng Feiyi	China	25.52	
19	4	1	Guilherme Guido	Brazil	25.58	
20	5	2	Vitaly Borisov	Russia	25.60	
21	4	8	Pavel Sankovich	Belarus	25.80	
22	6	7	Daniel Bell	New Zealand	25.91	
23	3	3	Roko Šimunić	Croatia	26.07	
24	3	4	Pedro Medel	Cuba	26.08	
25	6	8	Federico Grabich	Argentina	26.13	
26	3	6	Jean-François Schneiders	Luxembourg	26.70	
27	3	7	Oliver Elliot Banados	Chile	26.72	NR
28	3	1	Zane Jordan	Zambia	27.12	
29	3	2	Boris Kirillov	Azerbaijan	27.25	
30	2	4	Emile Bakale	Congo	28.34	
31	3	8	Antonio Tong	Macau	28.46	
32	2	5	Alban Laye-Joseph Diop	Senegal	29.02	
33	1	3	Kerson Hadley	Micronesia	30.46	
34	2	2	Ahmed Atari	Qatar	32.37	
35	2	7	Husam Ahmed	Maldives	33.44	
36	2	1	Mulualem Girma	Ethiopia	33.85	
37	1	4	Phathana Inthavong	Laos	35.30	
38	2	8	Mohamed Eltayeb	Sudan	35.98	
39	1	5	Thierry Videgni	Benin	42.95	
–	2	3	Adbulrahman Alishaq	Qatar		DNS
–	2	6	Folarin Ogunsola	Gambia		DNS
–	3	5	Omar Pinzón	Colombia		DNS
–	4	6	Ryosuke Irie	Japan		DNS

=== Semifinals ===
The semifinals were held at 19:14.

==== Semifinal 1 ====
Rank	Lane	Name	Nationality	Time	Notes
1	2	Liam Tancock	Great Britain	24.62	Q
2	4	Camille Lacourt	France	24.85	Q
3	6	Nick Thoman	United States	25.03	Q
4	5	Flori Lang	Switzerland	25.07	Q
5	3	Junya Koga	Japan	25.14	
6	7	Mirco di Tora	Italy	25.40	
7	1	Ashley Delaney	Australia	25.43	
8	8	Charles Francis	Canada	25.56	

==== Semifinal 2 ====
Rank	Lane	Name	Nationality	Time	Notes
1	4	Gerhard Zandberg	South Africa	24.91	Q
2	3	Aschwin Wildeboer	Spain	24.99	Q
3	2	David Plummer	United States	25.03	Q
4	6	Guy Barnea	Israel	25.09	Q
5	1	Hayden Stoeckel	Australia	25.20	
6	5	Helge Meeuw	Germany	25.20	
7	7	Aristeidis Grigoriadis	Greece	25.46	
8	8	Bastiaan Lijesen	Netherlands	25.51	

=== Final ===
The final was held at 18:35.

Rank	Lane	Name	Nationality	Time	Notes
1st place, gold medalist(s)	4	Liam Tancock	Great Britain	24.50	
2nd place, silver medalist(s)	5	Camille Lacourt	France	24.57	
3rd place, bronze medalist(s)	3	Gerhard Zandberg	South Africa	24.66	
4	6	Aschwin Wildeboer	Spain	24.82	
5	7	David Plummer	United States	24.92	
6	2	Nick Thoman	United States	25.01	
6	8	Guy Barnea	Israel	25.01	
8	1	Flori Lang	Switzerland	25.15	
