= Diving at the 2011 World Aquatics Championships – Men's synchronized 10 metre platform =

The men's synchronized 10 metre platform competition of the diving events at the 2011 World Aquatics Championships was held on July 17 with the preliminary round held in the morning and the final in the evening session.

== Medalists ==
Gold	Silver	Bronze
Qiu Bo; Huo Liang; China	Patrick Hausding; Sascha Klein; Germany	Oleksandr Gorshkovozov; Oleksandr Bondar; Ukraine

== Results ==
The preliminary round was held at 10:00 local time. The final was held at 17:05.

Green denotes finalists

Rank	Diver	Nationality	Preliminary		Final	
Rank	Diver	Nationality	Points	Rank	Points	Rank
1st place, gold medalist(s)	Qiu Bo; Huo Liang	China	477.96	1	480.03	1
2nd place, silver medalist(s)	Patrick Hausding; Sascha Klein	Germany	441.12	3	443.01	2
3rd place, bronze medalist(s)	Oleksandr Gorshkovozov; Oleksandr Bondar	Ukraine	423.99	6	435.36	3
4	Ilya Zakharov; Victor Minibaev	Russia	429.84	4	427.98	4
5	David Boudia; Nick McCrory	United States	447.21	2	420.69	5
6	Peter Waterfield; Thomas Daley	Great Britain	424.47	5	407.46	6
7	Germán Sánchez; Iván García	Mexico	419.58	7	393.09	7
8	Eric Sehn; Kevin Geyson	Canada	386.22	9	386.70	8
9	Kazuki Murakami; Yu Okamoto	Japan	396.12	8	380.52	9
10	Timofei Hordeichik; Vadim Kaptur	Belarus	372.57	11	378.78	10
11	Juan Ríos; Víctor Ortega	Colombia	372.96	10	374.43	11
12	Jeinkler Aguirre; José Guerra	Cuba	368.01	12	371.82	12
13	Francesco Dell'Uomo; Maicol Verzotto	Italy	361.86	13		
14	Hugo Parisi; Rui Marinho	Brazil	347.01	14		
15	Edickson Contreras; Enrique Rojas	Venezuela	333.00	15		
16	Ri Hyon-Ju; Hyon Il-Myong	North Korea	316.77	16		
17	Noor Husaini; Muhammad Nasrullah	Indonesia	304.80	17		
