= North Korea at the 2011 World Aquatics Championships =

Sporting event delegation

Flag of North Korea

North Korea competed at the 2011 World Aquatics Championships in Shanghai, China between July 16 and 31, 2011.

== Diving ==
North Korea has qualified 4 athletes in diving.

Men

Athlete	Event	Preliminary		Semifinals		Final	
Athlete	Event	Points	Rank	Points	Rank	Points	Rank
Il Myong Hyon	Men's 10m Platform	DNS		did not advance			
Hyon Ju Ri	Men's 10m Platform	237.95	35	did not advance			
Hyon Ju Ri; Il Myong Hyon	Men's 10m Synchro Platform	316.77	16			did not advance	

Women

Athlete	Event	Preliminary		Semifinals		Final	
Athlete	Event	Points	Rank	Points	Rank	Points	Rank
Jin Ok Kim	Women's 10m Platform	268.15	18 Q	304.35	13	did not advance	
Kum Hui Choe	Women's 10m Platform	243.20	27	did not advance			
Kum Hui Choe; Jin Ok Kim	Women's 10m Synchro Platform	273.06	8 Q			278.64	10

== Synchronised swimming ==
North Korea has qualified 10 athletes in synchronised swimming.

Women

Athlete	Event	Preliminary		Final	
Athlete	Event	Points	Rank	Points	Rank
Wang Ok-Gyong	Solo Technical Routine	87.300	12 Q	86.600	12
Wang Ok-Gyong	Solo Free Routine	86.970	10 Q	86.590	11
Jang Hyang-Mi; Wang Ok-Gyong	Duet Technical Routine	86.700	13	did not advance	
Jang Hyang-Mi; Wang Ok-Gyong	Duet Free Routine	86.450	14	did not advance	
Jang Hyang Mi; Jong Yon Hui; Kim Jin Gyong; Kim Jong Hui; Kim Ok Gyong; Maeng Ok Ju; Ri Ju Hyang; So Un Byol	Team Technical Routine	85.700	12 Q	86.100	11
Jang Hyang Mi; Jong Yon Hui; Kim Jin Gyong; Kim Jong Hui; Kim Ok Gyong; Kim Su Hyang; Maeng Ok Ju; Ri Ji Hyang; So Un Byol; Wang Ok Gyong	Free Routine Combination	84.340	9 Q	86.340	8
