= Venezuela at the 2011 World Aquatics Championships =

Sporting event delegation

Flag of Venezuela

Venezuela competed at the 2011 World Aquatics Championships in Shanghai, China between July 16 and 31, 2011.

== Diving ==
Venezuela has qualified 5 athletes in diving.

Men

Athlete	Event	Preliminary		Semifinals		Final	
Athlete	Event	Points	Rank	Points	Rank	Points	Rank
Edickson David Contreras Bracho	Men's 3m Springboard	342.10	39	did not advance			
Edickson David Contreras Bracho	Men's 10m Platform	336.00	29	did not advance			
Walter Enrique Rojas Dawson	Men's 10m Platform	361.40	25	did not advance			
Edickson David Contreras Bracho; Walter Enrique Rojas Dawson	Men's 10m Synchro Platform	333.00	15			did not advance	

Women

Athlete	Event	Preliminary		Semifinals		Final	
Athlete	Event	Points	Rank	Points	Rank	Points	Rank
Beannelys Sujeis Velasquez Salazar	Women's 1m Springboard	211.30	31			did not advance	
Beannelys Sujeis Velasquez Salazar	Women's 3m Springboard	171.40	40	did not advance			
Maria Florencia Betancourt Ortega	Women's 1m Springboard	204.90	34			did not advance	
Maria Florencia Betancourt Ortega	Women's 10m Platform	267.50	20	did not advance			
Lisette Casandra Ramirez Chancay	Women's 10m Platform	217.55	30	did not advance			
Maria Florencia Betancourt Ortega; Lisette Casandra Ramirez Chancay	Women's 10m Synchro Platform	221.04	14			did not advance	

== Open water swimming ==
Men

Athlete	Event	Final	
Athlete	Event	Time	Position
David Carrillo	Men's 5km	1:00:19.8	35
Johndry Segovia	Men's 5km	56:45.9	28
Johndry Segovia	Men's 10km	2:01:17.2	43
Erwin Maldonado	Men's 10km	1:56:52.8	33
Erwin Maldonado	Men's 25km	5:14:03.5	12
Angel Moreira	Men's 25km	DNF	

Women

Athlete	Event	Final	
Athlete	Event	Time	Position
Yanel Pinto	Women's 5km	1:01:44.60	27
Yanel Pinto	Women's 10km	DNF	
Andreina Pinto	Women's 10km	2:02:32.5	19

Mixed

Athlete	Event	Final	
Athlete	Event	Time	Position
Erwin Maldonado; Angel Moreira; Yanel Pinto	Team	1:02:32.0	11

== Swimming ==
Venezuela qualified 8 swimmers.

Men

Athlete	Event	Heats		Semifinals		Final	
Athlete	Event	Time	Rank	Time	Rank	Time	Rank
Crox Ernesto Acuna	Men's 100m Freestyle	50.28	40	did not advance			
Cristian Quintero	Men's 200m Freestyle	1:49.27	28	did not advance			
Cristian Quintero	Men's 400m Freestyle	3:52.73	23			did not advance	
Ricardo Monasterio	Men's 800m Freestyle	8:12.16	32			did not advance	
Miguel Ferreira	Men's 100m Breaststroke	1:02.29	44	did not advance			
Octavio Alesi	Men's 50m Butterfly	23.99	18	did not advance			
Octavio Alesi	Men's 100m Butterfly	53.56	34	did not advance			
Crox Ernesto Acuna; Octavio Alesi; Daniele Tirabassi; Cristian Quintero	Men's 4 x 100m Freestyle Relay	3:19.18	14			did not advance	
Daniele Tirabassi; Crox Ernesto Acuna; Ricardo Monasterio; Cristian Quintero	Men's 4 x 200m Freestyle Relay	7:21.75	15			did not advance	

Women

Athlete	Event	Heats		Semifinals		Final	
Athlete	Event	Time	Rank	Time	Rank	Time	Rank
Andreina Pinto	Women's 200m Freestyle	DNS		did not advance			
Andreina Pinto	Women's 400m Freestyle	4:08.80	12			did not advance	
Andreina Pinto	Women's 800m Freestyle	8:33.62	15			did not advance	
Andreina Pinto	Women's 1500m Freestyle	16:23.96	14			did not advance	
Jeserick Pinto	Women's 50m Butterfly	27.91	32	did not advance			

== Synchronised swimming ==
Venezuela has qualified 3 athletes in synchronised swimming.

Women

Athlete	Event	Preliminary		Final	
Athlete	Event	Points	Rank	Points	Rank
Greisy Gomez	Solo Technical Routine	74.700	23	did not advance	
Greisy Gomez	Solo Free Routine	74.490	21	did not advance	
Rosmaria Avila; Fredmary Zambrano	Duet Technical Routine	71.400	35	did not advance	
Rosmaria Avila; Fredmary Zambrano	Duet Free Routine	70.550	35	did not advance	
