= Colombia at the 2011 World Aquatics Championships =

- Flag of Colombia
- FINA code: COL
- National federation: Federación Colombiana de Natación
- Website: fecna.com.co

in Shanghai, China
- Medals: Gold 0 Silver 0 Bronze 0 Total 0

World Aquatics Championships appearances
- 1973; 1975; 1978; 1982; 1986; 1991; 1994; 1998; 2001; 2003; 2005; 2007; 2009; 2011; 2013; 2015; 2017; 2019; 2022; 2023; 2024

Colombia competed at the 2011 World Aquatics Championships in Shanghai, China between July 16 and 31, 2011.

== Diving ==
Colombia has qualified 5 athletes in diving.

Men

Athlete	Event	Preliminary		Semifinals		Final	
Athlete	Event	Points	Rank	Points	Rank	Points	Rank
Sebastián Villa	Men's 1m Springboard	349.30	17			did not advance	
Sebastián Villa	Men's 3m Springboard	425.30	13 Q	375.80	18	did not advance	
Sebastián Villa	Men's 10m Platform	414.25	18 Q	409.35	16	did not advance	
Víctor Ortega	Men's 10m Platform	416.35	16 Q	402.55	17	did not advance	
Víctor Ortega; Juan Rios	Men's 10m Synchro Platform	372.96	10 Q			374.43	11

Women

Athlete	Event	Preliminary		Semifinals		Final	
Athlete	Event	Points	Rank	Points	Rank	Points	Rank
Diana Pineda	Women's 1m Springboard	209.60	32			did not advance	
Diana Pineda	Women's 3m Springboard	238.05	35	did not advance			
Carolina Murillo	Women's 1m Springboard	181.85	39			did not advance	
Carolina Murillo	Women's 3m Springboard	194.30	38	did not advance			
Carolina Murillo	Women's 10m Platform	262.05	22	did not advance			

== Swimming ==
Colombia qualified 5 swimmers.

Men

Athlete	Event	Heats		Semifinals		Final	
Athlete	Event	Time	Rank	Time	Rank	Time	Rank
Juan Manuel Cambindo	Men's 50m Freestyle	23.31	41	did not advance			
Mateo de Angulo	Men's 200m Freestyle	1:52.25	39	did not advance			
Mateo de Angulo	Men's 400m Freestyle	3:55.92	29			did not advance	
Mateo de Angulo	Men's 800m Freestyle	8:05.98	23			did not advance	
Omar Pinzón	Men's 50m Backstroke	DNS		did not advance			
Omar Pinzón	Men's 100m Backstroke	54.88	24	did not advance			
Omar Pinzón	Men's 200m Backstroke	1:58.48	16 Q	1:58.95	13	did not advance	
Omar Pinzón	Men's 200m Butterfly	2:00.79	30	did not advance			
Omar Pinzón	Men's 200m IM	2:04.38	32	did not advance			
Jorge Murillo	Men's 100m Breaststroke	1:02.73	53	did not advance			
Jorge Murillo	Men's 200m Breaststroke	2:15.41	31	did not advance			

Women

Athlete	Event	Heats		Semifinals		Final	
Athlete	Event	Time	Rank	Time	Rank	Time	Rank
Isabella Arcila	Women's 50m Backstroke	29.27	27	did not advance			

== Synchronised swimming ==
Colombia has qualified 9 athletes in synchronised swimming.

Women

Athlete	Event	Preliminary		Final	
Athlete	Event	Points	Rank	Points	Rank
Asly Alegria	Solo Technical Routine	75.600	22	did not advance	
Asly Alegria	Solo Free Routine	73.320	23	did not advance	
Mónica Arango; Jennifer Cerquera	Duet Technical Routine	75.600	28	did not advance	
Mónica Arango; Jennifer Cerquera	Duet Free Routine	77.900	25	did not advance	
Asly Alegria; Estefanía Álvarez; Laura Arango; Mónica Arango; Paula Arcila; Jennifer Cerquera; Vanessa Cubillos; Zully Pérez	Team Technical Routine	75.000	19	did not advance	
Asly Alegria; Estefanía Álvarez; Laura Arango; Mónica Arango; Jennifer Cerquera; Vanessa Cubillos; Zully Pérez; Sara Rodríguez	Team Free Routine	76.780	16	did not advance	
