= Germany at the 2011 World Aquatics Championships =

- Flag of Germany
- World Aquatics code: GER
- National federation: Deutscher Schwimm-Verband
- Website: www.dsv.de/home

in Shanghai, China
- Medals Ranked 12th: Gold 1 Silver 3 Bronze 9 Total 13

World Aquatics Championships appearances
- 1991; 1994; 1998; 2001; 2003; 2005; 2007; 2009; 2011; 2013; 2015; 2017; 2019; 2022; 2023; 2024; 2025

Other related appearances
- East Germany (1973–1986); West Germany (1973–1986)

Germany competed at the 2011 World Aquatics Championships in Shanghai, China between July 16 and 31, 2011.

== Medalists ==
=== Medal summary ===
Medal	Name	Sport	Event	Date
Gold	Thomas Lurz	Open water swimming	Men's 5 km	22 July
Silver	Patrick Hausding; Sascha Klein	Diving	Men's 10 m Synchro Platform	17 July
Silver	Thomas Lurz	Open water swimming	Men's 10 km	20 July
Silver	Angela Maurer	Open water swimming	Women's 25 km	23 July
Bronze	Pavlo Rozenberg	Diving	Men's 1 m springboard	18 July
Bronze	Christin Steuer; Nora Subschinski	Diving	Women's 10 m Synchro Platform	18 July
Bronze	Isabelle Härle; Thomas Lurz; Jan Wolfgarten	Open water swimming	5 km Team	21 July
Bronze	Sascha Klein	Diving	Men's 10 m platform	24 July
Bronze	Paul Biedermann	Swimming	Men's 400 m freestyle	24 July
Bronze	Britta Steffen; Silke Lippok; Lisa Vitting; Daniela Schreiber	Swimming	Women's 4 × 100 metre freestyle relay	24 July
Bronze	Paul Biedermann	Swimming	Men's 200 m freestyle	26 July
Bronze	Christian vom Lehn	Swimming	Men's 200 m breaststroke	29 July
Bronze	Helge Meeuw; Hendrik Feldwehr; Benjamin Starke; Paul Biedermann	Swimming	Men's 4 × 100 m medley relay	31 July

== Diving ==
Germany has qualified 11 athletes in diving.

Men

Athlete	Event	Preliminary		Semifinals		Final	
Athlete	Event	Points	Rank	Points	Rank	Points	Rank
Pavlo Rozenberg	1 m Springboard	385.40	6 Q			436.50	Bronze medal
Stephan Feck	1 m Springboard	283.95	31			did not advance	
Patrick Hausding	3 m springboard	422.30	14 Q	408.70	15	did not advance	
Stephan Feck	3 m springboard	419.95	15 Q	405.90	16	did not advance	
Martin Wolfram	10 m platform	412.60	20	did not advance			
Sascha Klein	10 m platform	498.95	5 Q	502.85	2 Q	534.50	Bronze medal
Patrick Hausding; Stephan Feck	3 m synchro springboard	413.91	3 Q			414.39	5
Patrick Hausding; Sascha Klein	10 m Synchro Platform	441.12	3 Q			443.01	Silver medal

Women

Athlete	Event	Preliminary		Semifinals		Final	
Athlete	Event	Points	Rank	Points	Rank	Points	Rank
Uschi Freitag	1 m Springboard	247.70	16			did not advance	
Tina Punzel	1 m Springboard	206.05	33			did not advance	
Uschi Freitag	3 m springboard	315.60	7 Q	303.40	10 Q	288.10	11
Nora Subschinski	3 m springboard	311.65	9 Q	299.15	13	did not advance	
Nora Subschinski	10 m platform	289.50	12 Q	331.70	5 Q	386.30	12
Maria Kurjo	10 m platform	267.60	19	did not advance			
Katja Dieckow; Uschi Freitag	3 m Synchro Springboard	276.90	6 Q			299.40	5
Christin Steuer; Nora Subschinski	10 m synchro platform	292.56	3 Q			316.29	Bronze medal

== Open water swimming ==
Men

Athlete	Event	Final	
Athlete	Event	Time	Rank
Thomas Lurz	5 km	56:16.6	Gold medal
Jan Wolfgarten	5 km	56:40.2	23
Andreas Waschburger	10 km	1:54:39.8	10
Thomas Lurz	10 km	1:54:27.2	Silver medal
Thomas Lurz	25 km	DNS	
Benjamin Konschak	25 km	DNF	

Women

Athlete	Event	Final	
Athlete	Event	Time	Rank
Isabelle Härle	5 km	1:00:52.9	16
Isabell Donath	5 km	1:01:06.2	19
Angela Maurer	10 km	2:02:15.1	8
Isabell Donath	10 km	2:07:31.5	36
Angela Maurer	25 km	5:29:25.0	Silver medal
Antje Mahn	25 km	DNF	

Team

Athlete	Event	Final	
Athlete	Event	Time	Rank
Isabelle Härle; Thomas Lurz; Jan Wolfgarten	Team	57:44.2	Bronze medal

== Swimming ==
Germany qualified 23 swimmers.

Men

Athlete	Event	Preliminary		Semifinals		Final	
Athlete	Event	Time	Rank	Time	Rank	Time	Rank
Marco di Carli	50 m freestyle	22.65	26	did not advance			
Markus Deibler	100 m freestyle	did not start					
Marco di Carli	100 m freestyle	49.00	19	did not advance			
Tim Wallburger	200 m freestyle	1:48.43	17	did not advance			
Paul Biedermann	200 m freestyle	1:46.56	3 Q	1:45.93	2 Q	1:44.88	Bronze medal
Paul Biedermann	400 m freestyle	3:45.18	3 Q			3:44.14	Bronze medal
Clemens Rapp	400 m freestyle	3:51.07	21			did not advance	
Christian Kubusch	800 m freestyle	7:58.20	15			did not advance	
Christian Kubusch	1500 m freestyle	15:27.68	21			did not advance	
Helge Meeuw	50 m backstroke	25.04	3 Q	25.20	10	did not advance	
Helge Meeuw	100 m backstroke	54.15	12 Q	53.34	5 Q	53.28	7
Yannick Lebherz	200 m backstroke	1:58.30	14 Q	1:58.56	12	did not advance	
Hendrik Feldwehr	50 m breaststroke	27.67	8 Q	27.53	7 Q	27.41	4
Hendrik Feldwehr	100 m breaststroke	1:00.70	14 Q	1:00.91	15	did not advance	
Christian vom Lehn	100 m breaststroke	1:01.26	22	did not advance			
Christian vom Lehn	200 m breaststroke	2:10.67	2 Q	2:09.44	3 Q	2:09.06	Bronze medal
Steffen Deibler	50 m butterfly	23.50	5 Q	23.39	5 Q	23.55	6
Benjamin Starke	100 m butterfly	52.26	8 Q	52.18	11	did not advance	
Steffen Deibler	100 m butterfly	52.54	14 Q	52.55	15	did not advance	
Markus Deibler	200 m individual medley	2:00.99	22	did not advance			
Jan David Schepers	200 m individual medley	1:59.99	16 Q	1:59.83	13	did not advance	
Yannick Lebherz	400 m individual medley	4:17.31	11			did not advance	
Heats; Steffen Deibler (49.01); Markus Deibler (48.06); Christoph Fildebrandt (48.75); Marco di Carli (48.41); Final; Markus Deibler (49.24); Benjamin Starke (49.22); Christoph Fildebrandt (48.45); Marco di Carli (48.10)	Men's 4 × 100 m freestyle relay	3:14.23	6 Q			3:15.01	7
Heats; Tim Wallburger (1:48.05); Yannick Lebherz (1:49.46); Clemens Rapp (1:49.34); Paul Biedermann (1:46.46); Final; Paul Biedermann (1:45.20); Tim Wallburger (1:47.70); Christoph Fildebrandt (1:48.16); Benjamin Starke (1:47.26)	4 × 200 m freestyle relay	7:13.31	8 Q			7:08.32	4
Heats; Helge Meeuw (53.22); Hendrik Feldwehr (59.98); Benjamin Starke (51.79); Markus Deibler (48.70); Final; Helge Meeuw (53.53); Hendrik Feldwehr (59.72); Benjamin Starke (51.83); Paul Biedermann (47.52)	4 × 100 m medley relay	3:33.69	2 Q			3:32.60	Bronze medal

Women

Athlete	Event	Preliminary		Semifinals		Final	
Athlete	Event	Time	Rank	Time	Rank	Time	Rank
Dorothea Brandt	50 m freestyle	24.86	4 Q	25.06	9	did not advance	
Britta Steffen	50 m freestyle	did not start					
Daniela Schreiber	100 m freestyle	55.24	23	did not advance			
Britta Steffen	100 m freestyle	54.86	16	did not advance			
Silke Lippok	200 m freestyle	1:57.53	7 Q	1:57.02	7 Q	1:58.26	8
Jenny Mensing	50 m backstroke	28.84	16 Q	28.83	15	did not advance	
Jenny Mensing	100 m backstroke	1:01.64	21	did not advance			
Jenny Mensing	200 m backstroke	1:58.30	14 Q	1:58.56	12	did not advance	
Dorothea Brandt	50 m breaststroke	did not start					
Sarah Poewe	100 m breaststroke	1:45.93	3 Q	1:08.38	12	did not advance	
Sina Sutter	100 m butterfly	58.96	17	did not advance			
Heats; Britta Steffen (54.86); Silke Lippok (54.23); Lisa Vitting (54.66); Daniela Schreiber (53.53); Final; Britta Steffen (54.51); Silke Lippok (54.17); Lisa Vitting (53.85); Daniela Schreiber (53.12)	4 × 100 m freestyle relay	3:37.28	4 Q			3:36.05	Bronze medal
Heats; Silke Lippok (1:58.04); Lisa Vitting (1:59.14); Daniela Schreiber (1:59.84); Franziska Jansen (2:01.72)	4 × 200 m freestyle relay	7:58.74	10			did not advance	
Heats; Jenny Mensing (1:01.30); Sarah Poewe (1:07.24); Sina Sutter (58.65); Daniela Schreiber (53.71); Final; Jenny Mensing (1:01.21); Sarah Poewe (–); Sina Sutter (–); Daniela Schreiber (–)	4 × 100 m medley relay	4:00.90	8 Q			Disqualified	

== Synchronised swimming ==
Germany has qualified 2 athletes in synchronised swimming.

Women

Athlete	Event	Preliminary		Final	
Athlete	Event	Points	Rank	Points	Rank
Wiebke Jeske; Edith Zeppenfeld	Duet Technical Routine	75.800	27	did not advance	
Wiebke Jeske; Edith Zeppenfeld	Duet Free Routine	76.680	27	did not advance	

== Water polo ==
=== Men ===
Team Roster

- Alexander Tchigir
- Florian Naroska
- Fabian Schroedter
- Julian Real
- Marko Yannik Stamm
- Marc Torsten Politze – Captain
- Erik Marcin Bukowski
- Paul Schüler
- Tobias Kreuzmann
- Moritz Benedikt Oeler
- Andreas Schlotterbeck
- Dennis Eidner
- Roger Kong

Group D

Team	Pld	W	D	L	GF	GA	GD	Pts
Italy	3	3	0	0	32	12	+20	6
Germany	3	2	0	1	31	22	+9	4
United States	3	1	0	2	32	20	+12	2
South Africa	3	0	0	3	12	53	–41	0

July 18, 2011; 18:20	Report	United States	7–9	Germany	Shanghai Oriental Sports Center, Shanghai; Attendance: 800; Referees: Brgulian (MNE), Stavridis (GRE)
July 18, 2011; 18:20	Report	Score by quarters: 0–4, 2–2, 4–1, 1–2			Shanghai Oriental Sports Center, Shanghai; Attendance: 800; Referees: Brgulian (MNE), Stavridis (GRE)
July 18, 2011; 18:20	Report	Azevedo 2	Goals	Oeler 3	Shanghai Oriental Sports Center, Shanghai; Attendance: 800; Referees: Brgulian (MNE), Stavridis (GRE)

July 20, 2011; 13:30	Report	South Africa	8–16	Germany	Shanghai Oriental Sports Center, Shanghai; Attendance: 500; Referees: Ciric (SRB), Alexandrescu (ROU)
July 20, 2011; 13:30	Report	Score by quarters: 2–3, 2–4, 1–4, 3–5			Shanghai Oriental Sports Center, Shanghai; Attendance: 500; Referees: Ciric (SRB), Alexandrescu (ROU)
July 20, 2011; 13:30	Report	Kyte, Bell 3	Goals	Oeler 6	Shanghai Oriental Sports Center, Shanghai; Attendance: 500; Referees: Ciric (SRB), Alexandrescu (ROU)

July 22, 2011; 13:30	Report	Italy	7–6	Germany	Shanghai Oriental Sports Center, Shanghai; Attendance: 600; Referees: Borrell (ESP), Stavridis (GRE)
July 22, 2011; 13:30	Report	Score by quarters: 2–3, 1–2, 2–1, 2–0			Shanghai Oriental Sports Center, Shanghai; Attendance: 600; Referees: Borrell (ESP), Stavridis (GRE)
July 22, 2011; 13:30	Report	Aicardi 3	Goals	Real, Ploitze 2	Shanghai Oriental Sports Center, Shanghai; Attendance: 600; Referees: Borrell (ESP), Stavridis (GRE)

Playoff round

July 24, 2011; 21:00	Report	Japan	6–8	Germany	Shanghai Oriental Sports Center, Shanghai; Attendance: 550; Referees: Peris (CRO), Cabral (BRA)
July 24, 2011; 21:00	Report	Score by quarters: 3–3, 0–1, 2–3, 1–1			Shanghai Oriental Sports Center, Shanghai; Attendance: 550; Referees: Peris (CRO), Cabral (BRA)
July 24, 2011; 21:00	Report	Shimizu 4	Goals	Stamm 3	Shanghai Oriental Sports Center, Shanghai; Attendance: 550; Referees: Peris (CRO), Cabral (BRA)

Quarterfinals

July 26, 2011; 15:20	Report	Serbia	9–4	Germany	Shanghai Oriental Sports Center, Shanghai; Attendance: 500; Referees: Koganov (AZE), Alexandrescu (ROU)
July 26, 2011; 15:20	Report	Score by quarters: 2–0, 0–1, 4–3, 3–0			Shanghai Oriental Sports Center, Shanghai; Attendance: 500; Referees: Koganov (AZE), Alexandrescu (ROU)
July 26, 2011; 15:20	Report	Filipović 4	Goals	four players 1	Shanghai Oriental Sports Center, Shanghai; Attendance: 500; Referees: Koganov (AZE), Alexandrescu (ROU)

Classification 5–8 bracket

July 28, 2011; 12:10	Report	United States	9–8	Germany	Shanghai Oriental Sports Center, Shanghai; Attendance: 350; Referees: Caputi (ITA), Menendez (CUB)
July 28, 2011; 12:10	Report	Score by quarters: 4–2, 4–2, 0–2, 1–2			Shanghai Oriental Sports Center, Shanghai; Attendance: 350; Referees: Caputi (ITA), Menendez (CUB)
July 28, 2011; 12:10	Report	Bailey 2	Goals	Kreuzmann, Oeler 2	Shanghai Oriental Sports Center, Shanghai; Attendance: 350; Referees: Caputi (ITA), Menendez (CUB)

Seventh place game

July 30, 2011; 09:30	Report	Germany	5–8	Montenegro	Shanghai Oriental Sports Center, Shanghai; Attendance: 350; Referees: Alexandrescu (ROU), Ni (CHN)
July 30, 2011; 09:30	Report	Score by quarters: 3–4, 1–3, 1–1, 0–0			Shanghai Oriental Sports Center, Shanghai; Attendance: 350; Referees: Alexandrescu (ROU), Ni (CHN)
July 30, 2011; 09:30	Report	Real, Schüler 2	Goals	Radović, Brguljan 2	Shanghai Oriental Sports Center, Shanghai; Attendance: 350; Referees: Alexandrescu (ROU), Ni (CHN)
