= Swimming at the 2011 World Aquatics Championships – Men's 800 metre freestyle =

Men's 800 metre freestyle at the 2011 World Aquatics Championships
- Dates: July 26, 2011 (heats); July 27, 2011 (final)
- Competitors: 51 from 43 nations
- Winning time: 7:38.57

Medalists
gold medal	Sun Yang	China
silver medal	Ryan Cochrane	Canada
bronze medal	Gergő Kis	Hungary

The men's 800 metre freestyle competition of the swimming events at the 2011 World Aquatics Championships was held on July 26 with the heats and July 27 with the final.

== Records ==
Prior to the competition, the existing world and championship records were as follows.

	Name	Nation	Time	Location	Date
World record Championship record	Zhang Lin	China	7:32.12	Rome	July 29, 2009

== Results ==
=== Heats ===
51 swimmers participated in 7 heats.

Rank	Heat	Lane	Name	Nationality	Time	Notes
1	7	4	Sun Yang	China	7:45.29	Q
2	5	3	Pál Joensen	Faroe Islands	7:45.55	Q, NR
3	5	4	Ryan Cochrane	Canada	7:45.57	Q
4	6	3	Gergő Kis	Hungary	7:48.33	Q, NR
5	6	7	Oussama Mellouli	Tunisia	7:48.86	Q
6	7	6	Peter Vanderkaay	United States	7:49.13	Q
7	6	4	Sébastien Rouault	France	7:49.43	Q
8	5	5	Chad La Tourette	United States	7:49.94	Q
9	6	5	Samuel Pizzetti	Italy	7:51.59	
10	7	3	Job Kienhuis	Netherlands	7:52.63	
11	6	2	Mads Glæsner	Denmark	7:54.57	
12	5	6	Dai Jun	China	7:54.63	
13	7	2	Ryan Napoleon	Australia	7:56.84	
14	5	2	Yohsuke Miyamoto	Japan	7:57.13	
15	7	5	Christian Kubusch	Germany	7:58.20	
16	6	8	Juan Martin Pereyra	Argentina	7:59.06	NR
17	6	6	Federico Colbertaldo	Italy	8:01.10	
18	7	7	Heerden Herman	South Africa	8:01.79	
19	4	6	Anton Goncharov	Ukraine	8:02.07	
20	5	1	Mark Randall	South Africa	8:02.45	
21	7	8	Sergiy Frolov	Ukraine	8:03.87	
22	4	4	David Brandl	Austria	8:05.66	
23	3	2	Mateo de Angulo	Colombia	8:05.98	NR
24	4	3	Uladzimir Zhyharau	Belarus	8:06.04	
25	5	7	Gergely Gyurta	Hungary	8:06.14	
26	2	7	Jan Karel Petric	Slovenia	8:07.78	
27	6	1	Evgeny Kulikov	Russia	8:08.54	
28	7	1	Nikolay Bulakhov	Russia	8:08.78	
29	4	7	Mohamed Farhoud	Egypt	8:10.35	
30	4	2	Daniel Delgadillo Faisal	Mexico	8:10.82	
31	4	8	Jang Sang-Jin	South Korea	8:11.94	
32	3	5	Ricardo Monasterio	Venezuela	8:12.16	
33	4	5	Florian Janistyn	Austria	8:12.90	
34	5	8	Dylan Dunlop-Barrett	New Zealand	8:13.06	
35	3	4	Ventsislav Aydarski	Bulgaria	8:13.07	
36	3	1	Stefan Sorak	Serbia	8:14.45	NR
37	3	6	Christian Bayo	Puerto Rico	8:17.02	
38	3	3	Esteban Enderica	Ecuador	8:17.22	
39	2	6	Anton Sveinn McKee	Iceland	8:17.83	
40	2	2	Kevin Soow Choy Yeap	Malaysia	8:18.79	NR
41	4	1	Květoslav Svoboda	Czech Republic	8:20.41	
42	3	7	Ullalmath Gagan	India	8:21.90	NR
43	3	8	Nezir Karap	Turkey	8:23.37	
44	2	8	Erazmo Maršanić	Croatia	8:23.53	
45	2	5	Sobitjon Amilov	Uzbekistan	8:27.35	
46	2	3	Marko Blazevski	North Macedonia	8:27.39	
47	2	1	Pavol Jelenak	Slovakia	8:28.07	
48	2	4	Zhen Ren Teo	Singapore	8:28.67	
49	1	5	Iacovos Hadjiconstantinou	Cyprus	8:38.93	
50	1	4	Pavel Naroshkin	Estonia	8:44.06	
51	1	3	Heimanu Sichan	French Polynesia	9:00.87	

=== Final ===
The final was held at 18:41.

Rank	Lane	Name	Nationality	Time	Notes
1st place, gold medalist(s)	4	Sun Yang	China	7:38.57	
2nd place, silver medalist(s)	3	Ryan Cochrane	Canada	7:41.86	AM
3rd place, bronze medalist(s)	6	Gergő Kis	Hungary	7:44.94	NR
4	2	Oussama Mellouli	Tunisia	7:45.99	
5	5	Pál Joensen	Faroe Islands	7:46.51	
6	8	Chad La Tourette	United States	7:46.52	
7	7	Peter Vanderkaay	United States	7:46.64	
8	1	Sébastien Rouault	France	7:55.91	
