= Turkey at the 2011 World Aquatics Championships =

Sporting event delegation

Flag of Turkey

Turkey competed at the 2011 World Aquatics Championships in Shanghai, China between July 16 and 31, 2011.

== Swimming ==
Turkey qualified 6 swimmers.

Men

Athlete	Event	Heats		Semifinals		Final	
Athlete	Event	Time	Rank	Time	Rank	Time	Rank
Nezir Karap	Men's 800m Freestyle	8:23.37	43			did not advance	
Ömer Aslanoğlu	Men's 100m Breaststroke	1:02.71	51	did not advance			

Women

Athlete	Event	Heats		Semifinals		Final	
Athlete	Event	Time	Rank	Time	Rank	Time	Rank
Burcu Dolunay	Women's 50m Freestyle	26.01	27	did not advance			
Yesim Giresunlu	Women's 1500m Freestyle	17:23.60	25			did not advance	
Hazal Sarikaya	Women's 50m Backstroke	29.71	36	did not advance			
Hazal Sarikaya	Women's 100m Backstroke	1:03.69	39	did not advance			
Iris Rosenberger	Women's 50m Butterfly	27.82	31	did not advance			
Iris Rosenberger	Women's 100m Butterfly	1:00.99	38	did not advance			

== Synchronised swimming ==
Turkey has qualified 3 athletes in synchronised swimming.

Women

Athlete	Event	Preliminary		Final	
Athlete	Event	Points	Rank	Points	Rank
Tuğçe Tanış	Solo Technical Routine	73.000	27	did not advance	
Melis Öner	Solo Free Routine	73.600	22	did not advance	
Melis Öner; Tuğçe Tanış	Duet Technical Routine	71.800	34	did not advance	
Laçın Akçal; Melis Öner	Duet Free Routine	69.420	37	did not advance	
