= Malaysia at the 2011 World Aquatics Championships =

- Flag of Malaysia
- FINA code: MAS
- National federation: Amateur Swimming Union of Malaysia
- Website: malaysiaswimming.org

in Shanghai, China
- Medals: Gold 0 Silver 0 Bronze 0 Total 0

World Aquatics Championships appearances
- 1973; 1975; 1978; 1982; 1986; 1991; 1994; 1998; 2001; 2003; 2005; 2007; 2009; 2011; 2013; 2015; 2017; 2019; 2022; 2023; 2024

Malaysia competed at the 2011 World Aquatics Championships in Shanghai, China between July 16 and 31, 2011.

== Diving ==
Malaysia qualified 8 athletes in diving.

Men

Athlete	Event	Preliminary		Semifinals		Final	
Athlete	Event	Points	Rank	Points	Rank	Points	Rank
Yeoh Ken Nee	Men's 3m Springboard	385.80	25	did not advance			
Bryan Nickson Lomas	Men's 3m Springboard	426.75	12 Q	442.70	10 Q	404.90	11
Bryan Nickson Lomas	Men's 10m Platform	371.60	24	did not advance			
Ooi Tze Liang	Men's 10m Platform	411.90	21	did not advance			

Women

Athlete	Event	Preliminary		Semifinals		Final	
Athlete	Event	Points	Rank	Points	Rank	Points	Rank
Cheong Jun Hoong	Women's 1m Springboard	241.95	18			did not advance	
Cheong Jun Hoong	Women's 3m Springboard	276.80	19	did not advance			
Ng Yan Yee	Women's 3m Springboard	220.20	36	did not advance			
Pandelela Rinong	Women's 10m Platform	330.70	4 Q	348.70	4 Q	355.85	5
Traisy Vivien	Women's 10m Platform	274.85	16 Q	294.35	14	did not advance	
Leong Mun Yee; Ng Yan Yee	Women's 3m Synchro Springboard	254.40	11 Q			264.60	10
Leong Mun Yee; Pandelela Rinong	Women's 10m Synchro Platform	289.50	6 Q			305.34	6

== Swimming ==
Malaysia qualified 5 swimmers.

Men

Athlete	Event	Heats		Semifinals		Final	
Athlete	Event	Time	Rank	Time	Rank	Time	Rank
Kevin Yeap Soon Choy	Men's 800m Freestyle	8:18.79	40			did not advance	

Women

Athlete	Event	Heats		Semifinals		Final	
Athlete	Event	Time	Rank	Time	Rank	Time	Rank
Chui Lai Kwan	Women's 50 metre freestyle	26.22	34	did not advance			
Khoo Cai Lin	Women's 800m Freestyle	8:57.17	26			did not advance	
Chan Kah Yan	Women's 50m Backstroke	30.22	43	did not advance			
Christina Loh	Women's 50m Breaststroke	32.29	20	did not advance			

== Synchronised swimming ==
Malaysia has qualified 9 athletes in synchronised swimming.

Women

Athlete	Event	Preliminary		Final	
Athlete	Event	Points	Rank	Points	Rank
Katrina Ann Abdul Hadi	Solo Technical Routine	74.700	23	did not advance	
Katrina Ann Abdul Hadi; Png Hui Chuen	Duet Technical Routine	72.900	32	did not advance	
Katrina Ann Abdul Hadi; Png Hui Chuen	Duet Free Routine	73.490	33	did not advance	
Katrina Ann Abdul Hadi; Emanuelle Mah; Tan Mei May; Yeo Pei Ling; Png Hui Chuen; Mandy Yeap; Lee Yhing Huey; Lee Zhien Huey	Team Technical Routine	72.700	20	did not advance	
Katrina Ann Abdul Hadi; Emanuelle Mah; Tan Mei May; Yeo Pei Ling; Png Hui Chuen; Mandy Yeap; Lee Yhing Huey; Lee Zhien Huey	Team Free Routine	73.900	18	did not advance	

Reserve

- Tasha Jane
