= Belarus at the 2011 World Aquatics Championships =

Sporting event delegation

Flag of Belarus

Belarus competed at the 2011 World Aquatics Championships in Shanghai, China between July 16 and 31, 2011.

== Medalists ==
Medal	Name	Sport	Event	Date
Gold	Aleksandra Gerasimenya	Swimming	Women's 100m Freestyle	29 July

== Diving ==
Belarus has qualified 2 athletes in diving.

Men

Athlete	Event	Preliminary		Semifinals		Final	
Athlete	Event	Points	Rank	Points	Rank	Points	Rank
Timofei Hordeichik	Men's 10m Platform	375.20	23	did not advance			
Timofei Hordeichik; Vadim Kaptur	Men's 10m Synchro Platform	372.57	11 Q			378.78	10

== Swimming ==
Belarus qualified 7 swimmers.

Men

Athlete	Event	Heats		Semifinals		Final	
Athlete	Event	Time	Rank	Time	Rank	Time	Rank
Uladzimir Zhyharau	Men's 800m Freestyle	8:06.04	24			did not advance	
Uladzimir Zhyharau	Men's 1500m Freestyle	15:36.23	22			did not advance	
Pavel Sankovich	Men's 50m Backstroke	25.80	21	did not advance			
Pavel Sankovich	Men's 100m Butterfly	53.13	23	did not advance			
Pavel Sankovich	Men's 200m IM	2:03.52	29	did not advance			
Yauhen Tsurkin	Men's 50m Butterfly	24.09	21	did not advance			

Women

Athlete	Event	Heats		Semifinals		Final	
Athlete	Event	Time	Rank	Time	Rank	Time	Rank
Aliaksandra Herasimenia	Women's 50m Freestyle	24.85	3 Q	24.69	4 Q	24.65	5
Aliaksandra Herasimenia	Women's 100m Freestyle	54.47	10 Q	54.26	8 Q	53.45	Gold medal
Aliaksandra Herasimenia	Women's 50m Backstroke	28.38	7 Q	27.93	3 Q	28.09	6
Sviatlana Khakhlova	Women's 50m Freestyle	25.54	20	did not advance			
Sviatlana Khakhlova	Women's 50m Backstroke	29.29	28	did not advance			
Sviatlana Khakhlova	Women's 100m Backstroke	1:03.99	41	did not advance			
Sviatlana Khakhlova	Women's 50m Butterfly	26.98	19	did not advance			
Aliaksandra Herasimenia; Sviatlana Khakhlova; Yana Parakhouskaya; Yuliya Khitraya	Women's 4 x 100m Freestyle	3:43.41	12			did not advance	

== Synchronised swimming ==
Belarus has qualified 3 athletes in synchronised swimming.

Women

Athlete	Event	Preliminary		Final	
Athlete	Event	Points	Rank	Points	Rank
Nastassia Mekhanikava; Darya Navaselskaya	Duet Technical Routine	79.800	23	did not advance	
Nastassia Mekhanikava; Darya Navaselskaya	Duet Free Routine	79.950	23	did not advance	

Reserve

- Iya Navaselskaya
