= Cuba at the 2011 World Aquatics Championships =

- Flag of Cuba
- FINA code: CUB
- National federation: Federación Cubaña de Natación

in Shanghai, China
- Competitors: 26
- Medals: Gold 0 Silver 0 Bronze 0 Total 0

World Aquatics Championships appearances
- 1973; 1975; 1978; 1982; 1986; 1991; 1994; 1998; 2001; 2003; 2005; 2007; 2009; 2011; 2013; 2015; 2017; 2019; 2022; 2023; 2024

Cuba competed at the 2011 World Aquatics Championships in Shanghai, China between July 16 and 31, 2011.

== Diving ==
Cuba has qualified 7 athletes in diving.

Men

Athlete	Event	Preliminary		Semifinals		Final	
Athlete	Event	Points	Rank	Points	Rank	Points	Rank
Rene Hernandez	Men's 3m Springboard	327.90	43	did not advance			
Jorge Luis Pupo	Men's 3m Springboard	367.10	32	did not advance			
Jeinkler Aguirre	Men's 10m Platform	443.55	10 Q	411.10	15	did not advance	
José Antonio Guerra	Men's 10m Platform	139.90	36	did not advance			
Deyne Castellanos; Jorge Luis Pupo	Men's 3m Synchro Springboard	345.63	14			did not advance	
Jeinkler Aguirre; José Antonio Guerra	Men's 10m Synchro Platform	368.01	12 Q			371.82	12

Women

Athlete	Event	Preliminary		Semifinals		Final	
Athlete	Event	Points	Rank	Points	Rank	Points	Rank
Sahily Martinez	Women's 10m Platform	242.05	28	did not advance			
Annia Rivera	Women's 10m Platform	DNS		did not advance			

== Swimming ==
Cuba qualified 3 swimmers.

Men

Athlete	Event	Heats		Semifinals		Final	
Athlete	Event	Time	Rank	Time	Rank	Time	Rank
Hanser García	Men's 50m Freestyle	22.72	29	did not advance			
Hanser García	Men's 100m Freestyle	48.99	18	did not advance			
Pedro Medel	Men's 50m Backstroke	26.08	24	did not advance			
Pedro Medel	Men's 200m Backstroke	2:02.16	27	did not advance			
Alex Hernandez Medina	Men's 100m Backstroke	58.15	44	did not advance			
Alex Hernandez Medina	Men's 100m Butterfly	55.34	43	did not advance			

== Synchronised swimming ==
Cuba has qualified 4 athletes in synchronised swimming.

Women

Athlete	Event	Preliminary		Final	
Athlete	Event	Points	Rank	Points	Rank
Barbara Luna	Solo Technical Routine	67.500	31	did not advance	
Barbara Luna	Solo Free Routine	69.510	26	did not advance	
Lianne Caraballo; Darlys Rodriguez	Duet Technical Routine	71.400	35	did not advance	
Lianne Caraballo; Arianne Rodriguez	Duet Free Routine	70.330	36	did not advance	

== Water polo ==
=== Women ===
Team Roster

- Mairelis Lisandra Zunzunegui Morgan – Captain
- Daniela Escalona Santos
- Yeliana Caridad Bravo Curro
- Hirovis Hernendez Consuegra
- Danay Gutierrez More
- Mayelin Bernal Villa
- Yanet Lopez Hernandez
- Yadira Oms Barroso
- Dayana Morales Marrero
- Yordanka Pujol Palacio
- Lisbeth Santana Sosa
- Neldys Truffin Abreu
- Arisney Ramos Betancourt

==== Group D ====
Team	Pld	W	D	L	GF	GA	GD	Pts
Italy	3	3	0	0	40	15	+25	6
China	3	2	0	1	50	21	+29	4
Cuba	3	0	1	2	19	40	−21	1
South Africa	3	0	1	2	16	49	−33	1

July 17, 2011; 17:40	Report	Italy	12–4	Cuba	Shanghai Oriental Sports Center, Shanghai; Attendance: 300; Referees: Juhas (HUN); Wengenroth (SUI)
July 17, 2011; 17:40	Report	Score by quarters: 4–1, 2–1, 3–0, 3–2			Shanghai Oriental Sports Center, Shanghai; Attendance: 300; Referees: Juhas (HUN); Wengenroth (SUI)
July 17, 2011; 17:40	Report	three players 3	Goals	Hernendez Consuegra, Gutierrez More 2	Shanghai Oriental Sports Center, Shanghai; Attendance: 300; Referees: Juhas (HUN); Wengenroth (SUI)

July 19, 2011; 21:00	Report	China	19–6	Cuba	Shanghai Oriental Sports Center, Shanghai; Attendance: 700; Referees: Balfanbayev (KAZ), Gonzalez (PUR)
July 19, 2011; 21:00	Report	Score by quarters: 6–2, 4–0, 5–2, 4–2			Shanghai Oriental Sports Center, Shanghai; Attendance: 700; Referees: Balfanbayev (KAZ), Gonzalez (PUR)
July 19, 2011; 21:00	Report	Wang Yi 4	Goals	Hernendez Consuegra, Gutierrez More 2	Shanghai Oriental Sports Center, Shanghai; Attendance: 700; Referees: Balfanbayev (KAZ), Gonzalez (PUR)

July 21, 2011; 12:10	Report	South Africa	9–9	Cuba	Shanghai Oriental Sports Center, Shanghai; Attendance: 250; Referees: Reemnet (NED), Makita (JPN)
July 21, 2011; 12:10	Report	Score by quarters: 3–3, 1–1, 1–1, 4–4			Shanghai Oriental Sports Center, Shanghai; Attendance: 250; Referees: Reemnet (NED), Makita (JPN)
July 21, 2011; 12:10	Report	Harris 5	Goals	Bravo Curro, Hernandez Consuegra 3	Shanghai Oriental Sports Center, Shanghai; Attendance: 250; Referees: Reemnet (NED), Makita (JPN)

==== Playoff round ====
July 23, 2011; 16:50	Report	Russia	26–4	Cuba	Shanghai Oriental Sports Center, Shanghai; Attendance: 750; Referees: Pinker (RSA), Makita (JPN)
July 23, 2011; 16:50	Report	Score by quarters: 5–1, 8–0, 6–1, 7–2			Shanghai Oriental Sports Center, Shanghai; Attendance: 750; Referees: Pinker (RSA), Makita (JPN)
July 23, 2011; 16:50	Report	Lisunova 5	Goals	Hernendez Consuegra 2	Shanghai Oriental Sports Center, Shanghai; Attendance: 750; Referees: Pinker (RSA), Makita (JPN)

==== Classification 9–12 ====
July 25, 2011; 11:20	Report	New Zealand	10–11	Cuba	Shanghai Oriental Sports Center, Shanghai; Attendance: 300; Referees: Ni (CHN), Pinker (RSA)
July 25, 2011; 11:20	Report	Score by quarters: 2–3, 4–3, 3–2, 1–3			Shanghai Oriental Sports Center, Shanghai; Attendance: 300; Referees: Ni (CHN), Pinker (RSA)
July 25, 2011; 11:20	Report	Bowry 3	Goals	Gutierrez More 5	Shanghai Oriental Sports Center, Shanghai; Attendance: 300; Referees: Ni (CHN), Pinker (RSA)

==== Ninth place game ====
July 27, 2011; 10:50	Report	Cuba	7–12	Hungary	Shanghai Oriental Sports Center, Shanghai; Attendance: 250; Referees: Wengenroth (SUI), Rotsart (USA)
July 27, 2011; 10:50	Report	Score by quarters: 2–4, 3–2, 0–5, 2–1			Shanghai Oriental Sports Center, Shanghai; Attendance: 250; Referees: Wengenroth (SUI), Rotsart (USA)
July 27, 2011; 10:50	Report	Hernandez Consuegra, Gutierrez More 3	Goals	Czigány 3	Shanghai Oriental Sports Center, Shanghai; Attendance: 250; Referees: Wengenroth (SUI), Rotsart (USA)
