= Swimming at the 2011 World Aquatics Championships – Men's 100 metre butterfly =

Men's 100 metre butterfly at the 2011 World Aquatics Championships
- Dates: July 29, 2011 (heats and semifinals); July 30, 2011 (final)
- Competitors: 66 from 56 nations
- Winning time: 50.71

Medalists
gold medal	Michael Phelps	United States
silver medal	Konrad Czerniak	Poland
bronze medal	Tyler McGill	United States

The men's 100 metre butterfly competition of the swimming events at the 2011 World Aquatics Championships was held on July 29 with the heats and the semifinals and July 30 with the final.

== Records ==
Prior to the competition, the existing world and championship records were as follows.

	Name	Nation	Time	Location	Date
World record Championship record	Michael Phelps	United States	49.82	Rome	August 1, 2009

== Results ==
=== Heats ===
66 swimmers participated in 9 heats.

Rank	Heat	Lane	Name	Nationality	Time	Notes
1	8	5	Tyler McGill	United States	51.76	Q
2	7	3	Takuro Fujii	Japan	51.82	Q
3	9	5	Geoff Huegill	Australia	51.83	Q
4	8	7	Jason Dunford	Kenya	51.87	Q
5	8	4	Michael Phelps	United States	51.95	Q
6	7	6	Konrad Czerniak	Poland	52.10	Q
7	7	5	Yevgeny Korotyshkin	Russia	52.18	Q
8	7	4	Benjamin Starke	Germany	52.26	Q
9	9	3	Joeri Verlinden	Netherlands	52.27	Q
10	9	8	Sam Ashby	Australia	52.27	Q
11	9	6	László Cseh	Hungary	52.40	Q
12	9	1	Peter Mankoč	Slovenia	52.46	Q
13	6	6	Chad le Clos	South Africa	52.54	Q
14	8	6	Steffen Deibler	Germany	52.54	Q
15	9	7	Lars Frölander	Sweden	52.56	Q
16	8	1	Paweł Korzeniowski	Poland	52.57	Q
17	6	3	François Heersbrandt	Belgium	52.65	
18	9	2	Milorad Čavić	Serbia	52.67	
19	7	2	Antony James	Great Britain	52.68	
20	8	8	Ryan Pini	Papua New Guinea	52.69	
21	6	2	Joseph Bartoch	Canada	52.90	
22	6	7	Simão Morgado	Portugal	53.01	
23	6	8	Pavel Sankovich	Belarus	53.13	
24	7	7	Ivan Lenđer	Serbia	53.14	
25	7	1	Michael Rock	Great Britain	53.20	
26	8	2	Kaio Almeida	Brazil	53.20	
27	5	1	Ben Hockin	Paraguay	53.23	
28	8	3	Zhou Jiawei	China	53.23	
29	5	3	Lorenzo Benatti	Italy	53.38	
30	7	8	Nikita Konovalov	Russia	53.49	
31	5	2	Vytautas Janušaitis	Lithuania	53.50	
32	5	6	Dominik Meichtry	Switzerland	53.54	NR
33	6	1	Mario Todorović	Croatia	53.56	
34	6	5	Octavio Alesi	Venezuela	53.56	
35	6	4	Wu Peng	China	53.59	
36	4	3	Ham Jong-Hun	South Korea	53.94	
37	5	7	Jan Šefl	Czech Republic	53.97	
38	5	8	Shaune Fraser	Cayman Islands	54.19	
39	5	5	Hoàng Quý Phước	Vietnam	54.39	
40	4	4	Bradley Ally	Barbados	54.42	
41	4	5	Hsu Chi-Chieh	Chinese Taipei	54.44	
42	4	2	Yeugeniy Lazuka	Azerbaijan	54.70	
43	4	6	Alex Hernandez Medina	Cuba	55.34	
44	5	4	Stefanos Dimitriadis	Greece	55.41	
45	4	1	Joshua McLeod	Trinidad and Tobago	55.80	
46	4	7	Rami Anis	Syria	56.47	
47	2	4	Brad Hamilton	Jamaica	56.48	NR
48	3	5	Marcelino Richaards	Suriname	56.51	
49	2	5	Ifalemi Paea	Tonga	56.60	
50	4	8	Saeed Ashtiani	Iran	56.83	
51	3	1	Rommie Benjamin	Dominican Republic	57.11	
52	3	4	Édgar Crespo	Panama	57.24	
53	3	2	Javier Hernandez	Honduras	57.40	
54	3	3	Donny Utomo	Indonesia	57.59	
55	3	7	Oluseyi Fatayi-Williams	Nigeria	57.96	
56	3	6	Joao Matias	Angola	58.20	
57	3	8	Sofyan El Gadi	Libya	58.38	
58	2	3	Andrey Molchanov	Turkmenistan	1:00.83	
59	2	1	Iohanad Dheyaa	Iraq	1:01.10	
60	2	6	Alban Laye-Joseph Diop	Senegal	1:01.60	
61	2	7	Amer Ali	Iraq	1:01.88	
62	2	2	Adama Ouedraogo	Burkina Faso	1:03.29	NR
63	2	8	Khalid Ismaeel Alibaba	Bahrain	1:05.40	
64	1	3	Beni-Bertrand Binobagira	Burundi	1:19.76	
65	1	4	Janvier Niyonkuru	Burundi	1:27.01	
	1	5	Fiseha Hailu	Ethiopia		DSQ

=== Semifinals ===
The semifinals were held at 19:01.

==== Semifinal 1 ====
Rank	Lane	Name	Nationality	Time	Notes
1	3	Konrad Czerniak	Poland	51.54	Q, NR
2	4	Takuro Fujii	Japan	51.69	Q
3	5	Jason Dunford	Kenya	51.92	Q
4	6	Benjamin Starke	Germany	52.18	
5	2	Sam Ashby	Australia	52.19	
6	8	Paweł Korzeniowski	Poland	52.54	
7	1	Steffen Deibler	Germany	52.55	
8	7	Peter Mankoč	Slovenia	52.67	

==== Semifinal 2 ====
Rank	Lane	Name	Nationality	Time	Notes
1	3	Michael Phelps	United States	51.47	Q
2	4	Tyler McGill	United States	51.56	Q
3	6	Yevgeny Korotyshkin	Russia	51.77	Q
4	5	Geoff Huegill	Australia	51.85	Q
5	2	Joeri Verlinden	Netherlands	51.97	Q
6	7	László Cseh	Hungary	52.18	
7	8	Lars Frölander	Sweden	52.34	
8	1	Chad le Clos	South Africa	52.44	

=== Final ===
The final was held at 18:42.

Rank	Lane	Name	Nationality	Time	Notes
1st place, gold medalist(s)	4	Michael Phelps	United States	50.71	
2nd place, silver medalist(s)	5	Konrad Czerniak	Poland	51.15	NR
3rd place, bronze medalist(s)	3	Tyler McGill	United States	51.26	
4	1	Jason Dunford	Kenya	51.59	
5	6	Takuro Fujii	Japan	51.75	
6	2	Yevgeny Korotyshkin	Russia	51.86	
7	8	Joeri Verlinden	Netherlands	52.21	
8	7	Geoff Huegill	Australia	52.36	
