= Swimming at the 2011 World Aquatics Championships – Men's 200 metre individual medley =

Men's 200 metre individual medley at the 2011 World Aquatics Championships
- Dates: July 27, 2011 (heats and semifinals); July 28, 2011 (final)
- Competitors: 48 from 39 nations
- Winning time: 1:54.00 WR

Medalists
gold medal	Ryan Lochte	United States
silver medal	Michael Phelps	United States
bronze medal	László Cseh	Hungary

The men's 200 metre individual medley competition of the swimming events at the 2011 World Aquatics Championships took place July 27 and 28. The heats and semifinals took place July 27 and the final was held July 28.

The two main contenders for the event were the reigning World Champion and world record holder Ryan Lochte and Michael Phelps, the reigning Olympic champion. The final was won by Lochte in a world record time 1:54.00, bettering his previous time of 1:54.10. Phelps finished in second place with a personal best time of 1:54.16. So emphatic was Lochte and Phelps performance, that third-place finisher László Cseh said, "The Americans are too good for me. Only Ryan can beat Michael, but I can improve myself and continue to swim faster."

== Record ==
Prior to the competition, the existing world and championship record were as follows.

	Name	Nation	Time	Location	Date
World record Championship record	Ryan Lochte	United States	1:54.10	Rome	July 30, 2009

The following record was established during the competition:

Date	Round	Name	Nation	Time	Record
July 28, 2011	Final	Ryan Lochte	United States	1:54.00	WR

== Results ==
=== Heats ===
47 swimmers participated in 6 heats.

Rank	Heat	Lane	Name	Nationality	Time	Notes
1	4	4	Thiago Pereira	Brazil	1:57.82	Q
2	4	1	Dávid Verrasztó	Hungary	1:58.69	Q
3	4	7	Kenneth To	Australia	1:59.02	Q
4	6	4	Ryan Lochte	United States	1:59.04	Q
5	4	5	Markus Rogan	Austria	1:59.22	Q
6	6	2	Yuya Horihata	Japan	1:59.25	Q
7	6	1	Vytautas Janušaitis	Lithuania	1:59.43	Q, NR
8	5	4	Michael Phelps	United States	1:59.48	Q
9	4	2	Diogo Carvalho	Portugal	1:59.51	Q, NR
10	4	3	Henrique Rodrigues	Brazil	1:59.54	Q
11	5	5	James Goddard	Great Britain	1.59.68	Q
12	4	8	Marcin Cieślak	Poland	1:59.77	Q, NR
13	6	5	László Cseh	Hungary	1:59.80	Q
14	5	6	Darian Townsend	South Africa	1:59.97	Q
15	6	7	Gal Nevo	Israel	1:59.98	Q
16	6	6	Jan David Schepers	Germany	1:59.99	Q
17	5	8	Bradley Ally	Barbados	2:00.03	
18	5	2	Wang Shun	China	2:00.12	
19	6	3	Joe Roebuck	Great Britain	2:00.42	
20	3	1	Raphaël Stacchiotti	Luxembourg	2:00.87	NR
21	3	2	Andrew Ford	Canada	2:00.92	
22	5	3	Markus Deibler	Germany	2:00.99	
23	3	4	Marcin Tarczyński	Poland	2:01.14	
24	3	7	Taki Mrabet	Tunisia	2:01.44	
25	5	7	Simon Sjödin	Sweden	2:01.60	
26	3	3	Martin Liivamägi	Estonia	2:01.88	
27	2	6	Jung Won-Yong	South Korea	2:02.50	
28	2	5	Aleksey Derlyugov	Uzbekistan	2:03.30	
29	2	4	Pavel Sankovich	Belarus	2:03.52	
30	3	8	Nikša Roki	Croatia	2:03.89	
31	6	8	Federico Turrini	Italy	2:04.35	
32	2	3	Omar Pinzón	Colombia	2:04.38	
33	3	6	Zhang Fenglin	China	2:04.49	
34	4	6	Mitch Larkin	Australia	2:04.57	
35	1	4	Morad Berrada	Morocco	2:06.90	NR
36	1	3	Hocine Haciane	Andorra	2:07.14	
37	1	1	Irakli Bolkvadze	Georgia	2:07.29	
38	2	1	Vasilii Danilov	Kyrgyzstan	2:08.68	
39	1	6	Rafael Ferracuti	El Salvador	2:09.16	
40	2	8	Branden Whitehurst	U.S. Virgin Islands	2:09.58	
41	2	7	Saeed Ashtiani	Iran	2:09.81	
42	1	5	Pavol Jelenak	Slovakia	2:10.15	
43	1	7	Eli Ebenezer Wong	Northern Mariana Islands	2:10.18	
44	1	2	Edwin Angjeli	Albania	2:10.27	NR
45	2	2	Ensar Hajder	Bosnia and Herzegovina	2:11.99	
46	1	8	Paul Elaisa	Fiji	2:20.73	
	5	1	Alexander Tikhonov	Russia		DSQ
	3	5	Dinko Jukić	Austria		DNS

=== Semifinals ===
The semifinals were held at 19:24.

==== Semifinal 1 ====
Rank	Lane	Name	Nationality	Time	Notes
1	5	Ryan Lochte	United States	1:56.74	Q
2	6	Michael Phelps	United States	1:57.26	Q
3	3	Yuya Horihata	Japan	1:59.47	Q
4	1	Darian Townsend	South Africa	1:59.49	
5	8	Jan David Schepers	Germany	1:59.83	
6	2	Henrique Rodrigues	Brazil	2:00.04	
7	4	Dávid Verrasztó	Hungary	2:00.05	
8	7	Marcin Cieślak	Poland	2:01.65	

==== Semifinal 2 ====
Rank	Lane	Name	Nationality	Time	Notes
1	1	László Cseh	Hungary	1:57.66	Q
2	3	Markus Rogan	Austria	1:57.74	Q, NR
3	4	Thiago Pereira	Brazil	1:58.27	Q
4	7	James Goddard	Great Britain	1:58.50	Q
5	5	Kenneth To	Australia	1:59.17	Q
6	6	Vytautas Janušaitis	Lithuania	1:59.51	
7	8	Gal Nevo	Israel	1:59.67	
8	2	Diogo Carvalho	Portugal	1:59.80	

=== Final ===
The final was held at 18:13.

Rank	Lane	Name	Nationality	Time	Notes
1st place, gold medalist(s)	4	Ryan Lochte	United States	1:54.00	WR
2nd place, silver medalist(s)	5	Michael Phelps	United States	1:54.16	
3rd place, bronze medalist(s)	3	László Cseh	Hungary	1:57.69	
4	7	James Goddard	Great Britain	1:57.79	
5	6	Markus Rogan	Austria	1:58.14	
6	2	Thiago Pereira	Brazil	1:59.00	
7	1	Kenneth To	Australia	1:59.26	
8	8	Yuya Horihata	Japan	1:59.52	
