= Synchronised swimming at the 2011 World Aquatics Championships – Solo free routine =

The solo free routine competition of the synchronised swimming events at the 2011 World Aquatics Championships was held on July 20 with the preliminary round held in the morning and the final in the evening session.

== Medalists ==
Gold	Silver	Bronze
Natalia Ishchenko; Russia	Andrea Fuentes; Spain	Sun Wenyan; China

== Results ==
The preliminary round was held at 09:00 local time. The final was held at 19:00.

Green denotes finalists

Rank	Diver	Nationality	Preliminary		Final	
Rank	Diver	Nationality	Points	Rank	Points	Rank
1st place, gold medalist(s)	Natalia Ishchenko	Russia	98.190	1	98.550	1
2nd place, silver medalist(s)	Andrea Fuentes	Spain	96.010	2	96.520	2
3rd place, bronze medalist(s)	Sun Wenyan	China	95.970	3	95.840	3
4	Marie-Pier Boudreau Gagnon	Canada	94.490	4	94.910	4
5	Yumi Adachi	Japan	92.620	5	92.810	5
6	Lolita Ananasova	Ukraine	91.400	6	91.550	6
7	Linda Cerruti	Italy	89.610	7	89.950	7
8	Jenna Randall	Great Britain	88.240	9	88.880	8
9	Despoina Solomou	Greece	88.630	8	88.590	9
10	Anastasia Gloushkov	Israel	85.990	11	86.600	10
11	Wang Ok-Gyong	North Korea	86.970	10	86.590	11
12	Soňa Bernardová	Czech Republic	85.630	12	85.230	12
13	Park Hyu-Sun	South Korea	84.790	13		
14	Giovana Stephan	Brazil	84.390	14		
15	Pamela Fischer	Switzerland	82.960	15		
16	Nadine Brandl	Austria	82.520	16		
17	Szofi Kiss	Hungary	79.340	17		
18	Etel Sánchez	Argentina	78.840	18		
19	Kalina Yordanova	Bulgaria	76.210	19		
20	Kristina Krajcovicova	Slovakia	74.980	20		
21	Greisy Gomez	Venezuela	74.490	21		
22	Melis Oner	Turkey	73.600	22		
23	Asly Alegria	Colombia	73.320	23		
24	Elena Tini	San Marino	72.430	24		
25	Kirstin Anderson	New Zealand	69.530	25		
26	Barbara Luna	Cuba	69.510	26		
27	Violeta Mitnian	Costa Rica	68.850	27		
28	Au Ieong Sin Ieng	Macau	68.170	28		
29	Samara Talia Pattiasina	Indonesia	65.440	29		
30	Thanyaluck Puttisiriroj	Thailand	65.390	30		
31	Laura Strugnell	South Africa	62.690	31		
32	Seda Khachatrayan	Armenia	56.720	32		
–	Ainur Kerey	Kazakhstan	DNS			
