= Swimming at the 2011 World Aquatics Championships – Men's 50 metre butterfly =

Men's 50 metre butterfly at the 2011 World Aquatics Championships
- Dates: July 24, 2011 (heats and semifinals); July 25, 2011 (final)
- Competitors: 56 from 52 nations
- Winning time: 23.10

Medalists
gold medal	César Cielo	Brazil
silver medal	Matthew Targett	Australia
bronze medal	Geoff Huegill	Australia

The men's 50 metre butterfly competition of the swimming events at the 2011 World Aquatics Championships took place July 24 and 25. The heats and semifinals took place July 24 and the final was held July 25.

== Records ==
Prior to the competition, the existing world and championship records were as follows.

	Name	Nation	Time	Location	Date
World record	Rafael Muñoz	Spain	22.43	Málaga	April 5, 2009
Championship record	Milorad Čavić	Serbia	22.67	Rome	July 27, 2009

== Results ==
=== Heats ===
56 swimmers participated in 7 heats, qualified swimmers are listed:

Rank	Heat	Lane	Name	Nationality	Time	Notes
1	7	4	César Cielo	Brazil	23.26	Q
2	6	4	Geoff Huegill	Australia	23.27	Q
3	5	6	Florent Manaudou	France	23.31	Q
4	5	5	Jason Dunford	Kenya	23.48	Q
5	6	5	Steffen Deibler	Germany	23.50	Q
6	7	7	Ivan Lenđer	Serbia	23.51	Q
7	6	8	Konrad Czerniak	Poland	23.52	Q, NR
8	5	4	Matthew Targett	Australia	23.53	Q
9	6	3	Andriy Govorov	Ukraine	23.63	Q
10	7	3	Roland Schoeman	South Africa	23.64	Q
11	6	6	François Heersbrandt	Belgium	23.73	Q
12	5	2	Milorad Čavić	Serbia	23.76	Q
13	7	8	Benjamin Hockin	Paraguay	23.82	Q
14	7	5	Frederick Bousquet	France	23.84	Q
15	5	8	Antony James	Great Britain	23.94	Q
16	7	2	Joeri Verlinden	Netherlands	23.96	S-Off
16	7	1	Nikita Konovalov	Russia	23.96	S-Off
18	6	7	Octavio Alesi	Venezuela	23.99	
19	4	4	Peter Mankoč	Slovenia	24.01	
20	7	6	Mario Todorović	Croatia	24.05	
21	5	1	Yauheni Tsurkin	Belarus	24.09	
22	4	2	Yeugeniy Lazuka	Azerbaijan	24.14	
23	4	3	Marco Belotti	Italy	24.19	
23	5	3	Cullen Jones	United States	24.19	
25	6	1	Ryan Pini	Papua New Guinea	24.26	
26	4	1	Joseph Bartoch	Canada	24.29	
27	6	2	Zhou Jiawei	China	24.33	
28	5	7	Elvis Burrows	Bahamas	24.35	
29	4	8	Joshua McLeod	Trinidad and Tobago	24.41	
30	4	5	Daniel Bell	New Zealand	24.43	
31	4	6	Michal Rubáček	Czech Republic	24.59	
32	4	7	Virdhaval Vikram Khade	India	24.65	
33	3	6	Marcelino Richaards	Suriname	25.36	
34	3	5	Serghei Golban	Moldova	25.37	
35	3	4	Yellow Yeiyah	Nigeria	25.41	
36	3	8	Ifalemi Paea	Tonga	25.50	
37	3	7	Andrew Chetcuti	Malta	25.54	
38	2	4	Javier Hernandez	Honduras	26.05	
39	3	2	Joao Matias	Angola	26.06	
40	3	1	Obaid Al-Jasmi	United Arab Emirates	26.20	
41	3	3	Rami Anis	Syria	26.22	
42	1	3	Iohanad Dheyaa	Iraq	27.51	
43	2	5	Mark Thompson	Zambia	28.90	
44	1	1	Mohamed Abdelrawf Mahmoud	Sudan	29.02	
45	2	3	John Kamyuka	Botswana	29.03	
46	2	2	Conrad Gaira	Uganda	29.36	
47	2	6	Fiseha Hailu	Ethiopia	29.58	
48	1	6	Khalid Ismaeel Alibaba	Bahrain	29.95	
49	1	4	Inayath Hassan	Maldives	30.03	
50	2	7	Tolga Akcayli	Saint Vincent and the Grenadines	30.05	
51	1	2	Dionisio Augustine II	Micronesia	30.59	
52	2	1	Chingizov Alisher	Tajikistan	30.64	
53	2	8	Wei Ching Maou	American Samoa	31.29	
54	1	7	Kyle Zreibe	Antigua and Barbuda	36.25	
	1	8	Abd Mohamed Mahmoud	Sudan	DNS	
	1	5	Amer Ali	Iraq	DSQ	

=== Swimoff ===
As two swimmers had the same time in the heats at place 16 they had to participate in a swimoff to determine the last semifinal swimmer.

Rank	Lane	Name	Nationality	Time	Notes
1	4	Joeri Verlinden	Netherlands	23.77	Q
2	5	Nikita Konovalov	Russia	23.84	

=== Semifinals ===
The semifinals were held at 18:30.

==== Semifinal 1 ====
Rank	Lane	Name	Nationality	Time	Notes
1	4	Geoff Huegill	Australia	23.26	Q
2	5	Jason Dunford	Kenya	23.34	Q
3	6	Matthew Targett	Australia	23.41	Q
4	1	Frederick Bousquet	France	23.42	Q
5	2	Roland Schoeman	South Africa	23.48	
6	3	Ivan Lenđer	Serbia	23.54	
7	7	Milorad Čavić	Serbia	23.59	
8	8	Joeri Verlinden	Netherlands	23.73	

==== Semifinal 2 ====
Rank	Lane	Name	Nationality	Time	Notes
1	4	César Cielo	Brazil	23.19	Q
2	5	Florent Manaudou	France	23.32	Q
3	2	Andriy Govorov	Ukraine	23.39	Q
3	3	Steffen Deibler	Germany	23.39	Q
5	6	Konrad Czerniak	Poland	23.48	NR
6	7	François Heersbrandt	Belgium	23.68	
7	8	Antony James	Great Britain	23.74	
8	1	Benjamin Hockin	Paraguay	23.95	

=== Final ===
The final was held at 18:39.

Rank	Lane	Name	Nationality	Time	Notes
1st place, gold medalist(s)	4	César Cielo	Brazil	23.10	
2nd place, silver medalist(s)	1	Matthew Targett	Australia	23.28	
3rd place, bronze medalist(s)	5	Geoff Huegill	Australia	23.35	
4	8	Frederick Bousquet	France	23.38	
5	3	Florent Manaudou	France	23.49	
6	2	Steffen Deibler	Germany	23.55	
7	6	Jason Dunford	Kenya	23.60	
8	7	Andriy Govorov	Ukraine	23.64	
