= Mariko Sakai =

Japanese synchronized swimmer

Personal information
- Nationality: Japan
- Born: 3 December 1990 (age 35) Glen Rock, New Jersey, USA
- Height: 1.65 m (5 ft 5 in)

Sport
- Sport: Swimming
- Strokes: Synchronized swimming
- Club: Tokyo Synchro Club
- Updated on 25 May 2015

Mariko Sakai (酒井 麻里子, Sakai Mariko; born 3 December 1990) is a Japanese synchronized swimmer. She competed in the women's team event at the 2012 Olympic Games. She was born in New Jersey, United States and graduated from Seisen Jogakuin High School and the Department of Physical Education, College of Humanities and Sciences, Nihon University.
