= Rudá Franco =

Brazilian water polo player (born 1986)

Personal information
- Born: 25 July 1986 (age 39) Bauru, Brazil
- Height: 185 cm (6 ft 1 in)
- Weight: 90 kg (198 lb)

Sport
- Sport: Water Polo
- Club: Sesi
- Coached by: André Avallone
Medal record
Representing Brazil
Pan American Games
Bronze medal – third place	2011 Guadalajara	Team
Bronze medal – third place	2019 Lima	Team

Rudá Franco (born 25 July 1986) is a water polo player from Brazil. He won a bronze medal at the 2011 Pan American Games and competed at the 2016 Summer Olympics.
