= Livia Lang =

Austrian synchronized swimmer

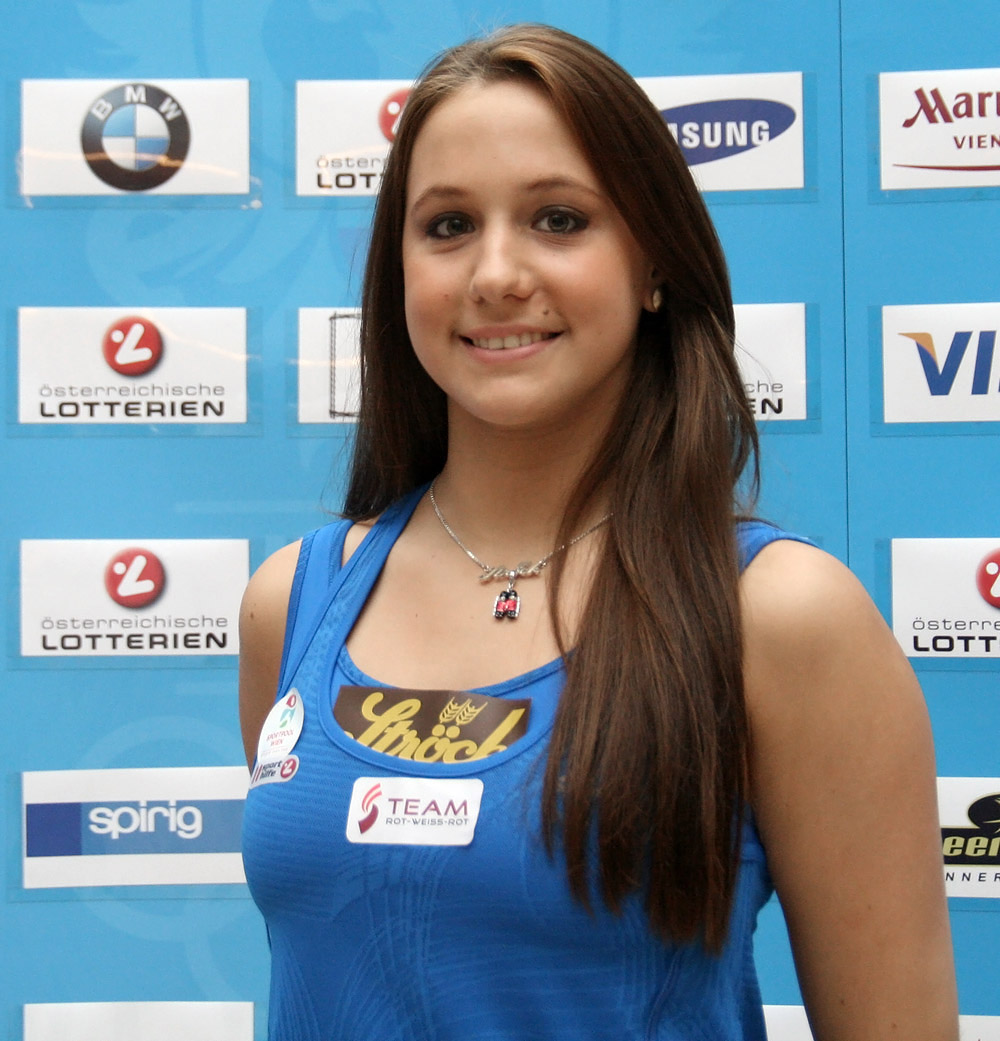
- Livia Lang (2012)

Personal information
- Nationality: Austria
- Born: 3 June 1994 (age 32) Budapest, Hungary
- Height: 162 cm (5 ft 4 in)
- Weight: 49 kg (108 lb)

Sport
- Sport: Swimming
- Strokes: Synchronized swimming
- Club: Schwimm-Union Wien
- Updated on 23 May 2015

Livia Lang (born 3 June 1994) is an Austrian synchronized swimmer. She competed in the women's duet at the 2012 Summer Olympics.
