= Eszter Czékus =

Hungarian synchronized swimmer

Personal information
- Born: 3 January 1995 (age 31) Budapest, Hungary
- Height: 173 cm (5 ft 8 in)

Sport
- Country: Hungary
- Sport: Synchronized swimming
- Updated on 23 May 2015

Eszter Czékus (born 3 January 1995) is a Hungarian synchronized swimmer. She competed in the women's duet at the 2012 Summer Olympics.
