= Spain at the 2011 World Aquatics Championships =

- Flag of Spain
- World Aquatics code: ESP
- National federation: Real Federación Española de Natación
- Website: www.rfen.es

in Shanghai, China
- Medals Ranked 22nd: Gold 0 Silver 1 Bronze 5 Total 6

World Aquatics Championships appearances
- 1973; 1975; 1978; 1982; 1986; 1991; 1994; 1998; 2001; 2003; 2005; 2007; 2009; 2011; 2013; 2015; 2017; 2019; 2022; 2023; 2024; 2025

Spain competed at the 2011 World Aquatics Championships in Shanghai, China between July 16 and 31, 2011.

== Medalists ==
Medal	Name	Sport	Event	Date
Silver	Andrea Fuentes	Synchronised Swimming	Solo Free Routine	20 July
Bronze	Andrea Fuentes	Synchronised Swimming	Solo Technical Routine	17 July
Bronze	Ona Carbonell; Andrea Fuentes	Synchronised Swimming	Duet Technical Routine	18 July
Bronze	Clara Basiana; Alba Cabello; Ona Carbonell; Margalida Crespí; Andrea Fuentes; Thais Henríquez; Paula Klamburg; Cristina Salvador; Sara Gijon (reserve); Irene Montrucchio (reserve)	Synchronised Swimming	Team Technical Routine	19 July
Bronze	Ona Carbonell; Andrea Fuentes	Sunchronised Swimming	Duet Free Routine	22 July
Bronze	Clara Basiana; Alba Cabello; Ona Carbonell; Margalida Crespí; Andrea Fuentes; Sara Gijon; Thais Henríquez; Paula Klamburg; Sara Gijon (reserve); Cristina Salvador (reserve)	Synchronised Swimming	Team Free Routine	23 July

== Diving ==
Spain has qualified 3 athletes in diving.

Men

Athlete	Event	Preliminary		Semifinals		Final	
Athlete	Event	Points	Rank	Points	Rank	Points	Rank
Javier Illana Garcia	Men's 1m Springboard	408.45	3 Q			402.40	5
Javier Illana Garcia	Men's 3m Springboard	427.95	11 Q	435.50	12 Q	429.00	9

Women

Athlete	Event	Preliminary		Semifinals		Final	
Athlete	Event	Points	Rank	Points	Rank	Points	Rank
Jennifer Benitez	Women's 1m Springboard	232.50	21			did not advance	
Jennifer Benitez	Women's 3m Springboard	261.30	25	did not advance			
Leyre Eizaguirre	Women's 1m Springboard	189.95	37			did not advance	
Leyre Eizaguirre	Women's 3m Springboard	263.05	24	did not advance			
Jennifer Benitez; Leyre Eizaguirre	Women's 3m Synchro Springboard	235.14	17			did not advance	

== Open water swimming ==
Men

Athlete	Event	Final	
Athlete	Event	Time	Position
Hector Ruiz Perez	Men's 5km	56:31.5	13
Hector Ruiz Perez	Men's 10km	1:59:15.5	39
Francisco Jose Hervas Jodar	Men's 10km	1:54:34.3	6
Francisco Jose Hervas Jodar	Men's 25km	5:11:20.4	4

Women

Athlete	Event	Final	
Athlete	Event	Time	Position
Marta Recio Paneque	Women's 5km	1:01:01.9	18
Erika Villaécija García	Women's 10km	2:02:18.7	10
Margarita Cabezas	Women's 10km	2:02:36.5	23
Margarita Cabezas	Women's 25km	5:29:42.0	8
Esther Nunez Morera	Women's 25km	5:38:09.6	13

== Swimming ==
Spain qualified 10 swimmers.

Men

Athlete	Event	Heats		Semifinals		Final	
Athlete	Event	Time	Rank	Time	Rank	Time	Rank
Aschwin Wildeboer	Men's 50m Backstroke	25.14	5 Q	24.99	4 Q	24.82	4
Aschwin Wildeboer	Men's 100m Backstroke	54.14	11 Q	54.03	12	did not advance	
Aschwin Wildeboer	Men's 200m Backstroke	DNS		did not advance			
Melquiades Alvarez	Men's 200m Breaststroke	2:11.86	9 Q	2:12.15	14	did not advance	

Women

Athlete	Event	Heats		Semifinals		Final	
Athlete	Event	Time	Rank	Time	Rank	Time	Rank
Melania Costa Schmid	Women's 200m Freestyle	1:58.04	11 Q	1:57.83	10	did not advance	
Melania Costa Schmid	Women's 400m Freestyle	4:07.02	6 Q			4:09.66	8
Melania Costa Schmid	Women's 800m Freestyle	DNS				did not advance	
Erika Villaecija Garcia	Women's 800m Freestyle	8:29.13	11			did not advance	
Erika Villaecija Garcia	Women's 1500m Freestyle	16:12.45	8 Q			16:09.71	7
Mercedes Peris	Women's 50m Backstroke	28.46	10 Q	27.93	2 Q	28.42	8
Mercedes Peris	Women's 100m Backstroke	1:01.55	18	did not advance			
Duane da Rocha	Women's 100m Backstroke	1:01.19	13 Q	1:00.55	14	did not advance	
Duane da Rocha	Women's 200m Backstroke	2:10.41	13	2:10.74	14	did not advance	
Marina García	Women's 100m Breaststroke	1:08.42	13 Q	1:08.81	16	did not advance	
Marina García	Women's 200m Breaststroke	2:26.96	5 Q	2:25.79	9	did not advance	
Judit Ignacio Sorribes	Women's 100m Butterfly	59.52	23	did not advance			
Judit Ignacio Sorribes	Women's 200m Butterfly	2:10.48	19	did not advance			
Mireia Belmonte Garcia	Women's 200m Butterfly	2:08.34	6 Q	2:07.94	9	did not advance	
Mireia Belmonte Garcia	Women's 200m IM	2:11.38	2 Q	2:12.37	10	did not advance	
Mireia Belmonte Garcia	Women's 400m IM	4:36.36	2 Q			4:34.94	4
Duane de Rocha; Marina García; Judit Ignacio Sorribes; Maria Fuster	Women's 4 × 100 m Medley Relay	4:03.98	12			did not advance	

== Synchronised swimming ==
Spain has qualified 10 athletes in synchronised swimming.

Women

Athlete	Event	Preliminary		Final	
Athlete	Event	Points	Rank	Points	Rank
Andrea Fuentes	Solo Technical Routine	94.600	3 Q	95.300	Bronze medal
Andrea Fuentes	Solo Free Routine	96.010	2 Q	96.520	Silver medal
Ona Carbonell; Andrea Fuentes	Duet Technical Routine	94.400	3 Q	95.400	Bronze medal
Ona Carbonell; Andrea Fuentes	Duet Free Routine	96.020	3 Q	96.500	Bronze medal
Clara Basiana; Alba Cabello; Ona Carbonell; Margalida Crespí; Andrea Fuentes; Thais Henríquez; Paula Klamburg; Cristina Salvador; Sara Gijon (reserve); Irene Montrucchio (reserve)	Team Technical Routine	95.700	3 Q	96.000	Bronze medal
Clara Basiana; Alba Cabello; Ona Carbonell; Margalida Crespí; Andrea Fuentes; Sara Gijon; Thais Henríquez; Paula Klamburg; Sara Gijon (reserve); Cristina Salvador (reserve)	Team Free Routine	96.030	3 Q	96.090	Bronze medal
Clara Basiana; Alba Cabello; Ona Carbonell; Margalida Crespí; Andrea Fuentes; Sara Gijon; Thais Henríquez; Paula Klamburg; Irene Montrucchio; Cristina Salvador	Free Routine Combination	95.640	3 Q	95.740	4

== Water polo ==
=== Men ===
Team Roster

- Inaki Morillo
- Mario Rodriguez
- Eric Marti
- Francisco Fernandez
- Guillermo Rios – Captain
- Marc Alferez
- Marc Barcelo
- Albert Lifante
- Xavier Trias
- Felipe Rocha
- Ivan Vargas
- Javier Gadea
- Daniel Pinedo

==== Group A ====
Team	Played	W	D	L	GF	GA	GD	Pts
Hungary	3	3	0	0	39	26	+13	6
Montenegro	3	2	0	1	35	23	+12	4
Spain	3	1	0	2	36	26	+10	2
Kazakhstan	3	0	0	3	15	50	–35	0

July 18, 2011; 10:50	Report	Kazakhstan	5–18	Spain	Shanghai Oriental Sports Center, Shanghai; Attendance: 550; Referees: Cabral (BRA), Rotsart (USA)
July 18, 2011; 10:50	Report	Score by quarters: 1–3, 0–4, 2–5, 2–6			Shanghai Oriental Sports Center, Shanghai; Attendance: 550; Referees: Cabral (BRA), Rotsart (USA)
July 18, 2011; 10:50	Report	Zhilyayev 3	Goals	four players 3	Shanghai Oriental Sports Center, Shanghai; Attendance: 550; Referees: Cabral (BRA), Rotsart (USA)

July 20, 2011; 18:20	Report	Spain	7–9	Montenegro	Shanghai Oriental Sports Center, Shanghai; Attendance: 650; Referees: Caputi (ITA), Bock (GER)
July 20, 2011; 18:20	Report	Score by quarters: 1–3, 1–2, 2–1, 3–3			Shanghai Oriental Sports Center, Shanghai; Attendance: 650; Referees: Caputi (ITA), Bock (GER)
July 20, 2011; 18:20	Report	Alferez, Vallès 2	Goals	Janović, Brguljan 2	Shanghai Oriental Sports Center, Shanghai; Attendance: 650; Referees: Caputi (ITA), Bock (GER)

July 22, 2011; 17:00	Report	Hungary	12–11	Spain	Shanghai Oriental Sports Center, Shanghai; Attendance: 650; Referees: Peris (CRO), Koganov (AZE)
July 22, 2011; 17:00	Report	Score by quarters: 5–5, 4–3, 2–1, 1–2			Shanghai Oriental Sports Center, Shanghai; Attendance: 650; Referees: Peris (CRO), Koganov (AZE)
July 22, 2011; 17:00	Report	Madaras, Hárai 3	Goals	Vargas 3	Shanghai Oriental Sports Center, Shanghai; Attendance: 650; Referees: Peris (CRO), Koganov (AZE)

==== Playoff round ====
July 24, 2011; 15:30	Report	Spain	9–8	Australia	Shanghai Oriental Sports Center, Shanghai; Attendance: 750; Referees: Brgulian (MNE), Rotsart (USA)
July 24, 2011; 15:30	Report	Score by quarters: 2–1, 3–1, 3–4, 1–2			Shanghai Oriental Sports Center, Shanghai; Attendance: 750; Referees: Brgulian (MNE), Rotsart (USA)
July 24, 2011; 15:30	Report	Perrone, García 3	Goals	three players 2	Shanghai Oriental Sports Center, Shanghai; Attendance: 750; Referees: Brgulian (MNE), Rotsart (USA)

==== Quarterfinals ====
July 26, 2011; 21:00	Report	Italy	10–6	Spain	Shanghai Oriental Sports Center, Shanghai; Attendance: 650; Referees: Margeta (SLO), Naumov (RUS)
July 26, 2011; 21:00	Report	Score by quarters: 2–1, 3–3, 3–1, 2–1			Shanghai Oriental Sports Center, Shanghai; Attendance: 650; Referees: Margeta (SLO), Naumov (RUS)
July 26, 2011; 21:00	Report	Figlioli 4	Goals	six players 1	Shanghai Oriental Sports Center, Shanghai; Attendance: 650; Referees: Margeta (SLO), Naumov (RUS)

==== Classification 5–8 ====
July 28, 2011; 15:30	Report	Montenegro	9–10	Spain	Shanghai Oriental Sports Center, Shanghai; Attendance: 1,100; Referees: Alexandrescu (ROU), Naumov (RUS)
July 28, 2011; 15:30	Report	Score by quarters: 2–2, 3–5, 2–1, 2–2			Shanghai Oriental Sports Center, Shanghai; Attendance: 1,100; Referees: Alexandrescu (ROU), Naumov (RUS)
July 28, 2011; 15:30	Report	Radovic 3	Goals	Trias 3	Shanghai Oriental Sports Center, Shanghai; Attendance: 1,100; Referees: Alexandrescu (ROU), Naumov (RUS)

==== Fifth place game ====
July 30, 2011; 10:50	Report	United States	10–11	Spain	Shanghai Oriental Sports Center, Shanghai; Referees: Ciric (SRB), Flahive (AUS)
July 30, 2011; 10:50	Report	Score by quarters: 0-4, 3-2, 3-2, 4-3			Shanghai Oriental Sports Center, Shanghai; Referees: Ciric (SRB), Flahive (AUS)
July 30, 2011; 10:50	Report	Varellas 3	Goals	Molina Rios, Perez Vargas 3	Shanghai Oriental Sports Center, Shanghai; Referees: Ciric (SRB), Flahive (AUS)

=== Women ===
Team Roster

- Ana Maria Copado Amoros
- Blanca Gil Sorli
- Anna Espar Llaquet
- Helena Lloret Gomez
- Matilde Ortiz Reyes
- Paula Chillida
- Lorena Miranda Dorado
- Maria Del Pilar Pena Carrasco
- Andrea Blas Martinez
- Ona Meseguer Flaque
- Maria Del Carmen Garcia Godoy
- Marta Bach Pascual
- Laura Ester Ramos

==== Group C ====
Team	Pld	W	D	L	GF	GA	GD	Pts
Greece	3	3	0	0	27	22	+5	6
Russia	3	2	0	1	38	18	+20	4
Spain	3	1	0	2	29	32	–3	2
Brazil	3	0	0	3	16	38	–22	0

July 17, 2011; 16:20	Report	Greece	10–9	Spain	Shanghai Oriental Sports Center, Shanghai; Attendance: 450; Referees: Remnet (NED); Koganov (AZE)
July 17, 2011; 16:20	Report	Score by quarters: 2–3, 3–1, 3–2, 2–3			Shanghai Oriental Sports Center, Shanghai; Attendance: 450; Referees: Remnet (NED); Koganov (AZE)
July 17, 2011; 16:20	Report	Asimaki, Gerolymou 3	Goals	Gil Sorli 3	Shanghai Oriental Sports Center, Shanghai; Attendance: 450; Referees: Remnet (NED); Koganov (AZE)

July 19, 2011; 12:10	Report	Spain	8–18	Russia	Shanghai Oriental Sports Center, Shanghai; Attendance: 250; Referees: Flahive (AUS), Deslieres (CAN)
July 19, 2011; 12:10	Report	Score by quarters: 1–4, 3–4, 3–6, 1–4			Shanghai Oriental Sports Center, Shanghai; Attendance: 250; Referees: Flahive (AUS), Deslieres (CAN)
July 19, 2011; 12:10	Report	three players 2	Goals	Prokofyeva 5	Shanghai Oriental Sports Center, Shanghai; Attendance: 250; Referees: Flahive (AUS), Deslieres (CAN)

July 21, 2011; 09:30	Report	Brazil	4–12	Spain	Shanghai Oriental Sports Center, Shanghai; Attendance: 450; Referees: Rustamova (UZB), Margeta Boris (SLO)
July 21, 2011; 09:30	Report	Score by quarters: 0–3, 2–4, 0–3, 2–2			Shanghai Oriental Sports Center, Shanghai; Attendance: 450; Referees: Rustamova (UZB), Margeta Boris (SLO)
July 21, 2011; 09:30	Report	Carvalho 2	Goals	Gil Sorli 5	Shanghai Oriental Sports Center, Shanghai; Attendance: 450; Referees: Rustamova (UZB), Margeta Boris (SLO)

==== Playoff round ====
July 23, 2011; 21:00	Report	Spain	6–15	China	Shanghai Oriental Sports Center, Shanghai; Referees: Stavridis (GRE), Naumov (RUS)
July 23, 2011; 21:00	Report	Score by quarters: 2–7, 1–2, 2–3, 1–3			Shanghai Oriental Sports Center, Shanghai; Referees: Stavridis (GRE), Naumov (RUS)
July 23, 2011; 21:00	Report	Gil Sorli 3	Goals	Ma Huanhuan 5	Shanghai Oriental Sports Center, Shanghai; Referees: Stavridis (GRE), Naumov (RUS)

==== Classification 9–12 ====
July 25, 2011; 12:40	Report	Hungary	17–13	Spain	Shanghai Oriental Sports Center, Shanghai; Attendance: 450; Referees: Deslieres (CAN), Wengenroth (SUI)
July 25, 2011; 12:40	Report	Score by quarters: 5–3, 5–3, 4–3, 3–4			Shanghai Oriental Sports Center, Shanghai; Attendance: 450; Referees: Deslieres (CAN), Wengenroth (SUI)
July 25, 2011; 12:40	Report	Bujka 5	Goals	Gil Sorli 5	Shanghai Oriental Sports Center, Shanghai; Attendance: 450; Referees: Deslieres (CAN), Wengenroth (SUI)

==== Eleventh place game ====
July 27, 2011; 09:30	Report	New Zealand	7–15	Spain	Shanghai Oriental Sports Center, Shanghai; Attendance: 250; Referees: Deslieres (CAN), Cabral (BRA)
July 27, 2011; 09:30	Report	Score by quarters: 2–3, 1–6, 2–4, 2–2			Shanghai Oriental Sports Center, Shanghai; Attendance: 250; Referees: Deslieres (CAN), Cabral (BRA)
July 27, 2011; 09:30	Report	Mason, Sieprath 2	Goals	Gil Sorli 7	Shanghai Oriental Sports Center, Shanghai; Attendance: 250; Referees: Deslieres (CAN), Cabral (BRA)
