= Greece at the 2011 World Aquatics Championships =

- Flag of Greece
- World Aquatics code: GRE
- National federation: Hellenic Swimming Federation
- Website: www.koe.org.gr

in Shanghai, China
- Medals Ranked 10th: Gold 2 Silver 1 Bronze 1 Total 4

World Aquatics Championships appearances
- 1973; 1975; 1978; 1982; 1986; 1991; 1994; 1998; 2001; 2003; 2005; 2007; 2009; 2011; 2013; 2015; 2017; 2019; 2022; 2023; 2024; 2025

Greece competed at the 2011 World Aquatics Championships in Shanghai, China between July 16 and 31, 2011.

== Medalists ==
Medal	Name	Sport	Event	Date
Gold	Spyridon Gianniotis	Open Water Swimming	Men's 10km	20 July
Gold	Eleni Kouvdou; Christina Chrysoula Tsoukala; Antiopi Melidoni; Ilektra Maria Psouni; Kyriaki Liosi; Alkisti Avramidou; Alexandra Asimaki; Antigoni Roumpesi; Angeliki Gerolymou; Triantafyllia Manolioudaki; Stavroula Antonakou; Georgia Lara; Eleni Goula	Water Polo	Women's Tournament	29 July
Silver	Spyridon Gianniotis	Open Water Swimming	Men's 5km	22 July
Bronze	Marianna Lymperta	Open Water Swimming	Women's 10km	19 July

== Diving ==
Greece has qualified 5 athletes in diving.

Men

Athlete	Event	Preliminary		Semifinals		Final	
Athlete	Event	Points	Rank	Points	Rank	Points	Rank
Alexandros Manos	Men's 1m Springboard	340.50	20			did not advance	
Alexandros Manos	Men's 3m Springboard	390.75	21	did not advance			
Stefanos Paparounas	Men's 1m Springboard	347.50	18			did not advance	
Stefanos Paparounas	Men's 3m Springboard	379.20	28	did not advance			
Michail Tzifas	Men's 10m Platform	322.40	32	did not advance			
Alexandros Manos; Stefanos Paparounas	Men's 3m Synchro Springboard	342.30	15			did not advance	

Women

Athlete	Event	Preliminary		Semifinals		Final	
Athlete	Event	Points	Rank	Points	Rank	Points	Rank
Iouliana Banousi; Eleni Katsouli	Women's 3m Synchro Springboard	235.23	16			did not advance	

== Open water swimming ==
Men

Athlete	Event	Final	
Athlete	Event	Time	Position
Antonis Fokaidis	Men's 5km	56:46.0	29
Antonis Fokaidis	Men's 10km	1:55:02.1	23
Spyridon Gianniotis	Men's 5km	56:17.4	Silver medal
Spyridon Gianniotis	Men's 10km	1:54:24.7	Gold medal

Women

Athlete	Event	Final	
Athlete	Event	Time	Position
Kalliopi Araouzou	Women's 5km	DSQ	
Kalliopi Araouzou	Women's 10km	2:02:31.3	18
Marianna Lymperta	Women's 10km	2:02:01.8	Bronze medal

Mixed

Athlete	Event	Final	
Athlete	Event	Time	Position
Marianna Lymperta; Antonis Fokaidis; Spyridon Gianniotis	Team	59:22.8	6

== Swimming ==
Greece qualified 8 swimmers.

Men

Athlete	Event	Heats		Semifinals		Final	
Athlete	Event	Time	Rank	Time	Rank	Time	Rank
Odysseas Meladinis	Men's 50m Freestyle	22.90	33	did not advance			
Odysseas Meladinis	Men's 100m Freestyle	49.71	30	did not advance			
Aristeidis Grigoriadis	Men's 50m Backstroke	25.26	10 Q	25.46	14	did not advance	
Aristeidis Grigoriadis	Men's 100m Backstroke	54.26	13 Q	54.22	16	did not advance	
Panagiotis Samilidis	Men's 100m Breaststroke	1:02.80	55	did not advance			
Panagiotis Samilidis	Men's 200m Breaststroke	DNS		did not advance			
Stefanos Dimitriadis	Men's 100m Butterfly	55.41	44	did not advance			
Stefanos Dimitriadis	Men's 200m Butterfly	1:56.82	12 Q	1:58.16	15	did not advance	
Ioannis Drymonakos	Men's 200m Butterfly	1:56.88	13 Q	1:57.77	14	did not advance	
Ioannis Drymonakos	Men's 400m IM	4:15.01	5 Q			4:14.62	5
Greece	Men's 4 × 100 m Medley Relay	DNS				did not advance	

Women

Athlete	Event	Heats		Semifinals		Final	
Athlete	Event	Time	Rank	Time	Rank	Time	Rank
Theodora Drakou	Women's 50m Freestyle	25.13	11 Q	25.22	13	did not advance	
Theodora Drakou	Women's 100m Freestyle	55.52	24	did not advance			
Theodora Drakou	Women's 50m Backstroke	28.46	10 Q	28.25	9	did not advance	
Marianna Lymperta	Women's 800m Freestyle	8:51.93	25			did not advance	
Marianna Lymperta	Women's 1500m Freestyle	16:35.16	19			did not advance	
Kristel Vourna	Women's 50m Butterfly	27.15	23	did not advance			
Kristel Vourna	Women's 100m Butterfly	59.27	22	did not advance			

== Synchronised swimming ==
Greece has qualified 2 athletes in synchronised swimming.

Women

Athlete	Event	Preliminary		Final	
Athlete	Event	Points	Rank	Points	Rank
Despoina Solomou	Solo Technical Routine	89.200	7 Q	89.4	7
Despoina Solomou	Solo Free Routine	88.630	8 Q	88.590	9
Evangelia Platanioti; Despoina Solomou	Duet Technical Routine	87.600	11 Q	87.200	11
Evangelia Platanioti; Despoina Solomou	Duet Free Routine	87.800	11 Q	86.950	10

== Water polo ==
=== Women ===
Team Roster

- Eleni Kouvdou
- Christina Chrysoula Tsoukala
- Antiopi Melidoni
- Ilektra Maria Psouni
- Kyriaki Liosi
- Alkisti Avramidou
- Alexandra Asimaki
- Antigoni Roumpesi
- Angeliki Gerolymou
- Triantafyllia Manolioudaki
- Stavroula Antonakou
- Georgia Lara
- Eleni Goula

==== Group C ====
Team	Pld	W	D	L	GF	GA	GD	Pts
Greece	3	3	0	0	27	22	+5	6
Russia	3	2	0	1	38	18	+20	4
Spain	3	1	0	2	29	32	–3	2
Brazil	3	0	0	3	16	38	–22	0

July 17, 2011; 16:20	Report	Greece	10–9	Spain	Shanghai Oriental Sports Center, Shanghai; Attendance: 450; Referees: Remnet (NED); Koganov (AZE)
July 17, 2011; 16:20	Report	Score by quarters: 2–3, 3–1, 3–2, 2–3			Shanghai Oriental Sports Center, Shanghai; Attendance: 450; Referees: Remnet (NED); Koganov (AZE)
July 17, 2011; 16:20	Report	Asimaki, Gerolymou 3	Goals	Gil Sorli 3	Shanghai Oriental Sports Center, Shanghai; Attendance: 450; Referees: Remnet (NED); Koganov (AZE)

July 19, 2011; 13:30	Report	Brazil	8–11	Greece	Shanghai Oriental Sports Center, Shanghai; Attendance: 200; Referees: Juhaz (HUN), Rotsart (USA)
July 19, 2011; 13:30	Report	Score by quarters: 2–3, 3–2, 1–3, 2–3			Shanghai Oriental Sports Center, Shanghai; Attendance: 200; Referees: Juhaz (HUN), Rotsart (USA)
July 19, 2011; 13:30	Report	eight players 1	Goals	four players 2	Shanghai Oriental Sports Center, Shanghai; Attendance: 200; Referees: Juhaz (HUN), Rotsart (USA)

July 21, 2011; 10:50	Report	Greece	6–5	Russia	Shanghai Oriental Sports Center, Shanghai; Attendance: 350; Referees: Borrell (ESP), Juhász (HUN)
July 21, 2011; 10:50	Report	Score by quarters: 2–2, 1–1, 1–1, 2–1			Shanghai Oriental Sports Center, Shanghai; Attendance: 350; Referees: Borrell (ESP), Juhász (HUN)
July 21, 2011; 10:50	Report	Roumpesi, Antonakou 2	Goals	Soboleva 2	Shanghai Oriental Sports Center, Shanghai; Attendance: 350; Referees: Borrell (ESP), Juhász (HUN)

==== Quarterfinals ====
July 25, 2011; 15:20	Report	Greece	12–10	Netherlands	Shanghai Oriental Sports Center, Shanghai; Attendance: 350; Referees: Brgulian (MNE), Balfanbayev (KAZ)
July 25, 2011; 15:20	Report	Score by quarters: 3–4, 5–1, 2–3, 2–2			Shanghai Oriental Sports Center, Shanghai; Attendance: 350; Referees: Brgulian (MNE), Balfanbayev (KAZ)
July 25, 2011; 15:20	Report	Roumpesi 3	Goals	van Belkum 3	Shanghai Oriental Sports Center, Shanghai; Attendance: 350; Referees: Brgulian (MNE), Balfanbayev (KAZ)

==== Semifinals ====
July 27, 2011; 16:50	Report	Greece	14–11	Italy	Shanghai Oriental Sports Center, Shanghai; Attendance: 950; Referees: Tulga (TUR), Borrell (ESP)
July 27, 2011; 16:50	Report	Score by quarters: 3–2, 5–3, 3–3, 3–3			Shanghai Oriental Sports Center, Shanghai; Attendance: 950; Referees: Tulga (TUR), Borrell (ESP)
July 27, 2011; 16:50	Report	three players 3	Goals	Bianconi, Rambaldi Guidasci 3	Shanghai Oriental Sports Center, Shanghai; Attendance: 950; Referees: Tulga (TUR), Borrell (ESP)

==== Gold medal game ====
July 29, 2011; 21:00	Report	China	8–9	Greece	Shanghai Oriental Sports Center, Shanghai; Attendance: 1600; Referees: Caputi (ITA), Brgulian (MNE)
July 29, 2011; 21:00	Report	Score by quarters: 2-2, 0-2, 4-4, 2-1			Shanghai Oriental Sports Center, Shanghai; Attendance: 1600; Referees: Caputi (ITA), Brgulian (MNE)
July 29, 2011; 21:00	Report	Liu, Wang 2	Goals	Asimaki, Roumpesi 3	Shanghai Oriental Sports Center, Shanghai; Attendance: 1600; Referees: Caputi (ITA), Brgulian (MNE)
