= Russia at the 2011 World Aquatics Championships =

Sporting event delegation

Flag of Russia

Russia competed at the 2011 World Aquatics Championships in Shanghai, China between July 16 and 31, 2011.

== Medalists ==
Medal	Name	Sport	Event	Date
Gold	Natalia Ishchenko	Synchronised Swimming	Solo Technical Routine	17 July
Gold	Natalia Ishchenko; Svetlana Romashina; Alexandra Zueva (reserve)	Synchronised Swimming	Duet Technical Routine	18 July
Gold	Anastasia Davydova; Maria Gromova; Elvira Khasyanova; Svetlana Kolesnichenko; Daria Korobova; Aleksandra Patskevich; Alla Shishkina; Angelika Timanina; Anisya Olkhova (reserve); Alexandra Zueva (reserve)	Synchronised Swimming	Team Technical Routine	19 July
Gold	Natalia Ishchenko	Synchronised Swimming	Solo Free Routine	20 July
Gold	Anastasia Davydova; Maria Gromova; Natalia Ishchenko; Elvira Khasyanova; Svetlana Kolesnichenko; Daria Korobova; Aleksandra Patskevich; Svetlana Romashina; Alla Shishkina; Angelika Timanina; Anisya Olkhova (reserve)	Synchronised Swimming	Free Routine Combination	21 July
Gold	Natalia Ishchenko; Svetlana Romashina; Alexandra Zueva (reserve)	Synchronised Swimming	Duet Free Routine	22 July
Gold	Anastasia Davydova; Maria Gromova; Elvira Khasyanova; Svetlana Kolesnichenko; Daria Korobova; Aleksandra Patskevich; Alla Shishkina; Angelika Timanina; Maria Gromova (reserve)	Synchronised Swimming	Team Free Routine	23 July
Gold	Anastasia Zuyeva	Swimming	Women's 50 metre backstroke	28 July
Silver	Ilya Zakharov; Evgeny Kuznetsov	Diving	Men's 3 m Synchro Springboard	19 July
Silver	Ilya Zakharov	Diving	Men's 3 m Springboard	22 July
Silver	Vladimir Dyatchin	Open Water Swimming	Men's 25km	23 July
Silver	Anastasia Zuyeva	Swimming	Women's 100m Backstroke	26 July
Silver	Yuliya Yefimova	Swimming	Women's 200m Breaststroke	29 July
Silver	Yuliya Yefimova	Swimming	Women's 50m Breaststroke	31 July
Bronze	Sergey Bolshakov	Open Water Swimming	Men's 10km	20 July
Bronze	Evgeny Kuznetsov	Diving	Men's 3 m Springboard	22 July
Bronze	Evgeny Drattsev	Open Water Swimming	Men's 5km	22 July
Bronze	Maria Kovtunovskaya; Nadezhda Fedotova; Ekaterina Prokofyeva; Sofia Konukh; Alexandra Antonova; Natalia Ryzhova-Alenicheva; Ekaterina Lisunova; Evgenia Soboleva; Ekaterina Tankeeva; Olga Belyaeva; Evgenia Ivanova; Yulia Gaufler; Anna Karnaukh	Water Polo	Women's Tournament	29 July

== Diving ==
Russia has qualified 11 athletes in diving.

Men

Athlete	Event	Preliminary		Semifinals		Final	
Athlete	Event	Points	Rank	Points	Rank	Points	Rank
Igor Koriakin	Men's 1m Springboard	291.95	28			did not advance	
Evgeny Kuznetsov	Men's 1m Springboard	378.25	8 Q			388.10	7
Evgeny Kuznetsov	Men's 3m Springboard	442.50	6 Q	447.65	7 Q	493.55	Bronze medal
Ilya Zakharov	Men's 3m Springboard	485.15	3 Q	470.50	3 Q	508.95	Silver medal
Gleb Galperin	Men's 10m Platform	413.10	19	did not advance			
Victor Minibaev	Men's 10m Platform	507.00	4 Q	493.55	3 Q	527.50	4
Ilya Zakharov; Evgeny Kuznetsov	Men's 3m Synchro Springboard	438.75	2 Q			451.89	Silver medal
Ilya Zakharov; Victor Minibaev	Men's 10m Synchro Platform	429.84	4 Q			427.98	4

Women

Athlete	Event	Preliminary		Semifinals		Final	
Athlete	Event	Points	Rank	Points	Rank	Points	Rank
Nadezda Bazhina	Women's 1m Springboard	262.75	7 Q			286.20	5
Nadezda Bazhina	Women's 3m Springboard	287.00	17 Q	327.55	7 Q	305.60	10
Anastasia Pozdniakova	Women's 1m Springboard	260.00	8 Q			251.70	12
Anastasia Pozdniakova	Women's 3m Springboard	303.90	11 Q	283.45	17	did not advance	
Yulia Koltunova	Women's 10m Platform	287.20	13 Q	317.80	9 Q	293.90	11
Natalia Goncharova	Women's 10m Platform	254.10	25	did not advance			
Svetlana Philippova; Anastasia Pozdniakova	Women's 3m Synchro Springboard	288.12	4 Q			282.72	8
Daria Govor; Yulia Koltunova	Women's 10m Synchro Platform	266.28	11 Q			291.24	9

== Open water swimming ==
Men

Athlete	Event	Final	
Athlete	Event	Time	Position
Evgeny Drattsev	Men's 5km	56:18.5	Bronze medal
Sergey Bolshakov	Men's 5km	56:26.0	6
Sergey Bolshakov	Men's 10km	1:54:31.8	Bronze medal
Vladimir Dyatchin	Men's 10km	1:54:38.7	9
Vladimir Dyatchin	Men's 25km	5:11:15.6	Silver medal
Vasily Boykov	Men's 25km	5:11:36.3	7

Women

Athlete	Event	Final	
Athlete	Event	Time	Position
Elizaveta Gorshkova	Women's 5km	1:00:50.4	13
Ekaterina Seliverstova	Women's 5km	1:00:44.1	5
Ekaterina Seliverstova	Women's 10km	2:03:18.4	24
Anna Uvarova	Women's 10km	2:05:11.7	28
Anna Uvarova	Women's 25km	5:29:38.9	6
Maria Bulakhova	Women's 25km	5:34:21.2	11

Mixed

Athlete	Event	Final	
Athlete	Event	Time	Position
Sergey Bolshakov; Evgeny Drattsev; Ekaterina Seliverstova	Team	58:32.7	5

== Swimming ==
Russia qualified 32 swimmers.

Men

Athlete	Event	Heats		Semifinals		Final	
Athlete	Event	Time	Rank	Time	Rank	Time	Rank
Sergey Fesikov	Men's 50m Freestyle	22.16	7 Q	22.09	9	did not advance	
Andrey Grechin	Men's 50m Freestyle	22.33	16 Q	22.36	15	did not advance	
Andrey Grechin	Men's 100m Freestyle	48.59	6 Q	48.67	13	did not advance	
Nikita Lobintsev	Men's 100m Freestyle	48.78	12 Q	49.00	16	did not advance	
Nikita Lobintsev	Men's 200m Freestyle	1:48.28	14 Q	1:47.34	7 Q	1:46.57	6
Nikita Lobintsev	Men's 400m Freestyle	353.52	24			did not advance	
Danila Izotov	Men's 200m Freestyle	1:47.72	9 Q	1:47.39	8 Q	1:47.46	8
Evgeny Kulikov	Men's 800m Freestyle	8:08.54	27			did not advance	
Nikolay Bulakhov	Men's 800m Freestyle	8:08.78	28			did not advance	
Vitaly Borisov	Men's 50m Backstroke	25.60	20	did not advance			
Vitaly Borisov	Men's 100m Backstroke	54.66	21	did not advance			
Stanislav Donets	Men's 100m Backstroke	53.85	5 Q	54.10	13	did not advance	
Stanislav Donets	Men's 200m Backstroke	1:57.30	3 Q	1:58.00	8 Q	1:57.36	6
Aleksandr Triznov	Men's 50m Breaststroke	27.84	10 Q	27.73	12	did not advance	
Roman Sloudnov	Men's 100m Breaststroke	1:00.91	17	did not advance			
Anton Lobanov	Men's 100m Breaststroke	1:01.64	32	did not advance			
Anton Lobanov	Men's 200m Breaststroke	2:14.99	30	did not advance			
Nikita Konovalov	Men's 50m Butterfly	23.96	17	did not advance			
Nikita Konovalov	Men's 100m Butterfly	53.49	30	did not advance			
Yevgeny Korotyshkin	Men's 100m Butterfly	52.18	7 Q	51.77	5 Q	51.86	6
Nikolay Skvortsov	Men's 200m Butterfly	1:57.85	22	did not advance			
Alexander Tikhonov	Men's 200m IM	DSQ		did not advance			
Evgeny Lagunov; Andrey Grechin; Nikita Lobintsev; Sergey Fesikov; Danila Izotov*; Vladimir Morozov*	Men's 4 x 100m Freestyle Relay	3:13.61	3 Q			3:12.99	5
Danila Izotov; Evgeny Lagunov; Artem Lobuzov; Alexander Sukhorukov	Men's 4 x 200m Freestyle Relay	7:14.12	11			did not advance	
Stanislav Donets; Roman Sloudnov; Yevgeny Korotyshkin; Sergey Fesikov	Men's 4 x 100m Medley Relay	3:36.82	12			did not advance	

- * raced in heats only

Women

Athlete	Event	Heats		Semifinals		Final	
Athlete	Event	Time	Rank	Time	Rank	Time	Rank
Svetlana Fedulova	Women's 50m Freestyle	25.89	25	did not advance			
Svetlana Fedulova	Women's 50m Butterfly	27.61	28	did not advance			
Veronika Popova	Women's 100m Freestyle	54.88	17 Q*	54.82	12	did not advance	
Veronika Popova	Women's 200m Freestyle	1:58.89	19	did not advance			
Kseniya Moskvina	Women's 50m Backstroke	28.71	14 Q	28.75	13	did not advance	
Kseniya Moskvina	Women's 100m Backstroke	1:01.59	19	did not advance			
Anastasia Zuyeva	Women's 50m Backstroke	28.20	1 Q	27.88	1 Q	27.79	Gold medal
Anastasia Zuyeva	Women's 100m Backstroke	1:00.88	12 Q	59.41	2 Q	59.06	Silver medal
Anastasia Zuyeva	Women's 200m Backstroke	2:11.23	17	did not advance			
Yuliya Yefimova	Women's 50m Breaststroke	30.72	2 Q	30.81	3 Q	30.49	Silver medal
Yuliya Yefimova	Women's 100m Breaststroke	1:07.81	9 Q	1:07.53	7 Q	1:06.56	4
Yuliya Yefimova	Women's 200m Breaststroke	2:25.98	3 Q	2:23.66	2 Q	2:22.22	Silver medal
Yuliya Yefimova	Women's 200m IM	2:15.56	20	did not advance			
Daria Deeva	Women's 100m Breaststroke	1:09.12	19	did not advance			
Irina Bespalova	Women's 100m Butterfly	58.89	15 Q	59.02	16	did not advance	
Yana Martynova	Women's 200m Butterfly	2:11.82	25	did not advance			
Yana Martynova	Women's 400m IM	4:45.53	20			did not advance	
Veronika Popova; Margarita Nesterova; Natalya Lovtsova; Elena Sokolova	Women's 4 x 100m Freestyle Relay	3:40.73	11			did not advance	
Veronika Popova; Elena Sokolova; Viktoriya Andreeva; Kira Volodina	Women's 4 x 200m Freestyle Relay	7:59.69	11			did not advance	
Anastasia Zuyeva; Yuliya Yefimova; Irina Bespalova; Veronika Popova	Women's 4 x 100m Medley Relay	3:59.08	2 Q			3:57.38	4

- * qualified due to withdrawal of another swimmer

== Synchronised swimming ==
Russia has qualified 12 athletes in synchronised swimming.

Women

Athlete	Event	Preliminary		Final	
Athlete	Event	Points	Rank	Points	Rank
Natalia Ishchenko	Solo Technical Routine	97.900	1 Q	98.300	Gold medal
Natalia Ishchenko	Solo Free Routine	98.190	1 Q	98.550	Gold medal
Natalia Ishchenko; Svetlana Romashina	Duet Technical Routine	97.500	1 Q	98.200	Gold medal
Natalia Ishchenko; Svetlana Romashina	Duet Free Routine	98.490	1 Q	98.490	Gold medal
Anastasia Davydova; Maria Gromova; Elvira Khasyanova; Svetlana Kolesnichenko; Daria Korobova; Aleksandra Patskevich; Alla Shishkina; Angelika Timanina	Team Technical Routine	97.700	1 Q	98.300	Gold medal
Anastasia Davydova; Maria Gromova; Elvira Khasyanova; Svetlana Kolesnichenko; Daria Korobova; Aleksandra Patskevich; Alla Shishkina; Angelika Timanina	Team Free Routine	98.440	1 Q	98.620	Gold medal
Anastasia Davydova; Maria Gromova; Natalia Ishchenko; Elvira Khasyanova; Svetlana Kolesnichenko; Daria Korobova; Aleksandra Patskevich; Svetlana Romashina; Alla Shishkina; Angelika Timanina	Free Routine Combination	97.970	1 Q	98.470	Gold medal

Reserves

- Anisya Olkhova
- Alexandra Zueva

== Water polo ==
=== Women ===
Team Roster

- Maria Kovtunovskaya
- Nadezhda Fedotova
- Ekaterina Prokofyeva
- Sofia Konukh – Captain
- Alexandra Antonova
- Natalia Ryzhova-Alenicheva
- Ekaterina Lisunova
- Evgenia Soboleva
- Ekaterina Tankeeva
- Olga Belyaeva
- Evgenia Ivanova
- Yulia Gaufler
- Anna Karnaukh

==== Group C ====
Team	Pld	W	D	L	GF	GA	GD	Pts
Greece	3	3	0	0	27	22	+5	6
Russia	3	2	0	1	38	18	+20	4
Spain	3	1	0	2	29	32	–3	2
Brazil	3	0	0	3	16	38	–22	0

July 17, 2011; 15:00	Report	Brazil	4–15	Russia	Shanghai Oriental Sports Center, Shanghai; Attendance: 600; Referees: Flahive (AUS); Koryzna (POL)
July 17, 2011; 15:00	Report	Score by quarters: 1–6, 1–2, 2–2, 0–5			Shanghai Oriental Sports Center, Shanghai; Attendance: 600; Referees: Flahive (AUS); Koryzna (POL)
July 17, 2011; 15:00	Report	four players 1	Goals	Belyaeva 4	Shanghai Oriental Sports Center, Shanghai; Attendance: 600; Referees: Flahive (AUS); Koryzna (POL)

July 19, 2011; 12:10	Report	Spain	8–18	Russia	Shanghai Oriental Sports Center, Shanghai; Attendance: 250; Referees: Flahive (AUS), Deslieres (CAN)
July 19, 2011; 12:10	Report	Score by quarters: 1–4, 3–4, 3–6, 1–4			Shanghai Oriental Sports Center, Shanghai; Attendance: 250; Referees: Flahive (AUS), Deslieres (CAN)
July 19, 2011; 12:10	Report	three players 2	Goals	Prokofyeva 5	Shanghai Oriental Sports Center, Shanghai; Attendance: 250; Referees: Flahive (AUS), Deslieres (CAN)

July 21, 2011; 10:50	Report	Greece	6–5	Russia	Shanghai Oriental Sports Center, Shanghai; Attendance: 350; Referees: Borrell (ESP), Juhász (HUN)
July 21, 2011; 10:50	Report	Score by quarters: 2–2, 1–1, 1–1, 2–1			Shanghai Oriental Sports Center, Shanghai; Attendance: 350; Referees: Borrell (ESP), Juhász (HUN)
July 21, 2011; 10:50	Report	Roumpesi, Antonakou 2	Goals	Soboleva 2	Shanghai Oriental Sports Center, Shanghai; Attendance: 350; Referees: Borrell (ESP), Juhász (HUN)

==== Playoff round ====
July 23, 2011; 16:50	Report	Russia	26–4	Cuba	Shanghai Oriental Sports Center, Shanghai; Attendance: 750; Referees: Pinker (RSA), Makita (JPN)
July 23, 2011; 16:50	Report	Score by quarters: 5–1, 8–0, 6–1, 7–2			Shanghai Oriental Sports Center, Shanghai; Attendance: 750; Referees: Pinker (RSA), Makita (JPN)
July 23, 2011; 16:50	Report	Lisunova 5	Goals	Hernendez Consuegra 2	Shanghai Oriental Sports Center, Shanghai; Attendance: 750; Referees: Pinker (RSA), Makita (JPN)

==== Quarterfinals ====
July 25, 2011; 14:00	Report	United States	7–9	Russia	Shanghai Oriental Sports Center, Shanghai; Attendance: 450; Referees: Tulga (TUR), Bock (GER)
July 25, 2011; 14:00	Report	Score by quarters: 2–0, 3–2, 1–5, 1–2			Shanghai Oriental Sports Center, Shanghai; Attendance: 450; Referees: Tulga (TUR), Bock (GER)
July 25, 2011; 14:00	Report	Seidemann, Wenger 2	Goals	Prokofyeva 5	Shanghai Oriental Sports Center, Shanghai; Attendance: 450; Referees: Tulga (TUR), Bock (GER)

==== Semifinals ====
July 27, 2011; 21:00	Report	Russia	12–13	China	Shanghai Oriental Sports Center, Shanghai; Referees: Margeta (SLO), Flahive (AUS)
July 27, 2011; 21:00	Report	Score by quarters: 3–4, 3–3, 3–2, 3–4			Shanghai Oriental Sports Center, Shanghai; Referees: Margeta (SLO), Flahive (AUS)
July 27, 2011; 21:00	Report	Fedotova, Ekaterina Tankeeva 3	Goals	Sun Yating, Wang Yi	Shanghai Oriental Sports Center, Shanghai; Referees: Margeta (SLO), Flahive (AUS)

==== Bronze medal game ====
July 29, 2011; 16:00	Report	Russia	8–7	Italy	Shanghai Oriental Sports Center, Shanghai; Attendance: 1,000; Referees: Juhaz (HUN), Rotsart (USA)
July 29, 2011; 16:00	Report	Score by quarters: 4–0, 2–1, 2–6, 0–0			Shanghai Oriental Sports Center, Shanghai; Attendance: 1,000; Referees: Juhaz (HUN), Rotsart (USA)
July 29, 2011; 16:00	Report	Belyaeva 3	Goals	Casanova, Bianconi 2	Shanghai Oriental Sports Center, Shanghai; Attendance: 1,000; Referees: Juhaz (HUN), Rotsart (USA)
