= Swimming at the 2011 World Aquatics Championships – Women's 50 metre backstroke =

Women's 50 metre backstroke at the 2011 World Aquatics Championships
- Dates: July 27, 2011 (heats and semifinals); July 28, 2011 (final)
- Competitors: 57 from 48 nations
- Winning time: 27.79

Medalists
gold medal	Anastasia Zuyeva	Russia
silver medal	Aya Terakawa	Japan
bronze medal	Missy Franklin	United States

The women's 50 metre backstroke competition of the swimming events at the 2011 World Aquatics Championships took place on July 27 with the heats and the semifinals and July 28 with the final.

== Records ==
Prior to the competition, the existing world and championship records were as follows.

	Name	Nation	Time	Location	Date
World record Championship record	Zhao Jing	China	27.06	Rome	July 30, 2009

== Results ==
=== Heats ===
57 swimmers participated in 8 heats.

Rank	Heat	Lane	Name	Nationality	Time	Notes
1	6	4	Anastasia Zuyeva	Russia	28.20	Q
2	6	7	Zhou Yanxin	China	28.24	Q
3	8	4	Gao Chang	China	28.27	Q
4	8	5	Aya Terakawa	Japan	28.34	Q
5	7	8	Elizabeth Pelton	United States	28.35	Q
6	8	2	Missy Franklin	United States	28.37	Q
7	7	4	Aleksandra Gerasimenya	Belarus	28.38	Q
8	7	5	Emily Seebohm	Australia	28.39	Q
8	8	6	Georgia Davies	Great Britain	28.39	Q
10	6	2	Theodora Drakou	Greece	28.46	Q, NR
10	6	5	Mercedes Peris	Spain	28.46	Q
12	7	3	Julia Wilkinson	Canada	28.62	Q
13	6	8	Ekaterina Avramova	Bulgaria	28.66	Q, NR
14	8	8	Kseniya Moskvina	Russia	28.71	Q
15	8	3	Gemma Spofforth	Great Britain	28.79	Q
16	6	6	Jenny Mensing	Germany	28.84	Q
17	7	1	Sinead Russell	Canada	28.87	
18	3	4	Mie Nielsen	Denmark	28.89	
19	6	3	Shiho Sakai	Japan	28.89	
20	7	6	Belinda Hocking	Australia	28.92	
21	5	3	Daryna Zevina	Ukraine	28.99	
22	5	6	Sanja Jovanović	Croatia	29.03	
22	5	7	Karin Prinsloo	South Africa	29.03	
24	7	7	Elena Gemo	Italy	29.12	
25	7	2	Etiene Medeiros	Brazil	29.16	
26	8	7	Alina Vats	Ukraine	29.24	
27	4	6	Isabella Arcila	Colombia	29.27	
28	5	2	Fabienne Nadarajah	Austria	29.29	
28	6	1	Sviatlana Khakhlova	Belarus	29.29	
30	5	4	Simona Baumrtova	Czech Republic	29.37	
31	4	8	Anni Alitalo	Finland	29.39	
32	5	5	Tao Li	Singapore	29.40	
33	8	1	Maria Gonzalez Ramirez	Mexico	29.45	
34	4	4	Alicja Tchorz	Poland	29.50	
35	5	1	Ingibjoerg Kristi Jonsdottir	Iceland	29.66	
36	5	8	Hazal Sarikaya	Turkey	29.71	
37	3	3	Cecilia Bertoncello	Argentina	29.73	
38	4	5	Yekaterina Rudenko	Kazakhstan	29.76	
39	4	1	Kiera Aitken	Bermuda	29.78	
40	4	3	Lau Yin Yan	Hong Kong	29.79	
41	4	7	Sophia Batchelor	New Zealand	29.90	
42	4	2	Alana Dillette	Bahamas	29.97	
43	3	5	Kah Chan	Malaysia	30.22	
44	3	2	Anna Volchkov	Israel	30.59	
45	3	6	Monica Ramirez Abella	Andorra	30.66	
46	3	7	Sylvia Bruhnlehner	Kenya	32.09	
47	2	4	Jessika Cossa	Mozambique	32.29	
48	3	8	Anahit Barseghyan	Armenia	32.49	
49	3	1	Nicola Muscat	Malta	32.62	
50	2	5	Jade Ashleigh Howard	Zambia	32.91	
51	2	3	Kiran Khan	Pakistan	33.18	
52	2	6	Angelique Trinquier	Monaco	33.19	
53	2	2	Mareme Faye	Senegal	33.43	
54	2	7	Vitiny Hemthon	Cambodia	36.57	
55	1	3	Faleumata Samassekou	Mali	37.79	
56	1	4	Gebremedhin Yanet Seyoum	Ethiopia	38.06	
57	1	5	Antoinette Guedia Mouafo	Cameroon	39.02	

=== Semifinals ===
The semifinals were held at 18:13.

==== Semifinal 1 ====
Rank	Lane	Name	Nationality	Time	Notes
1	2	Mercedes Peris	Spain	27.93	Q
2	7	Julia Wilkinson	Canada	28.10	Q
3	3	Missy Franklin	United States	28.14	Q
4	5	Aya Terakawa	Japan	28.16	Q
5	6	Emily Seebohm	Australia	28.19	Q
6	4	Zhou Yanxin	China	28.44	
7	1	Kseniya Moskvina	Russia	28.75	
8	8	Jenny Mensing	Germany	28.83	

==== Semifinal 2 ====
Rank	Lane	Name	Nationality	Time	Notes
1	4	Anastasia Zuyeva	Russia	27.88	Q
2	6	Aleksandra Gerasimenya	Belarus	27.93	Q
3	5	Gao Chang	China	28.05	Q
4	7	Theodora Drakou	Greece	28.25	NR
5	2	Georgia Davies	Great Britain	28.26	
6	1	Ekaterina Avramova	Bulgaria	28.64	NR
7	8	Gemma Spofforth	Great Britain	28.75	
8	3	Elizabeth Pelton	United States	28.85	

=== Final ===
The final was held at 19:17.

Rank	Lane	Name	Nationality	Time	Notes
1st place, gold medalist(s)	4	Anastasia Zuyeva	Russia	27.79	
2nd place, silver medalist(s)	1	Aya Terakawa	Japan	27.93	
3rd place, bronze medalist(s)	7	Missy Franklin	United States	28.01	
4	6	Gao Chang	China	28.06	
5	8	Emily Seebohm	Australia	28.07	
6	2	Julia Wilkinson	Canada	28.09	
6	3	Aliaksandra Herasimenia	Belarus	28.09	
8	5	Mercedes Peris Minguet	Spain	28.42	
