= Diving at the 2011 World Aquatics Championships – Men's 3 metre springboard =

The men's 3 metre springboard competition of the diving events at the 2011 World Aquatics Championships was held on July 21 with the preliminary round and the semifinals and the final on 22 July.

== Medalists ==
Gold	Silver	Bronze
He Chong; China	Ilya Zakharov; Russia	Evgeny Kuznetsov; Russia

== Results ==
The preliminary round was held at 09:00, and the semifinal was held at 14:00 on 21 July. The final was held at 17:00 on 22 July.

Green denotes finalists

Blue denotes semifinalists

Rank	Diver	Nationality	Preliminary		Semifinal		Final	
Rank	Diver	Nationality	Points	Rank	Points	Rank	Points	Rank
1st place, gold medalist(s)	He Chong	China	500.40	2	523.50	1	554.30	1
2nd place, silver medalist(s)	Ilya Zakharov	Russia	485.15	3	470.50	3	508.95	2
3rd place, bronze medalist(s)	Evgeny Kuznetsov	Russia	442.50	6	447.65	7	493.55	3
4	Qin Kai	China	504.75	1	523.25	2	481.90	4
5	Troy Dumais	United States	434.95	9	466.80	5	479.45	5
6	Yahel Castillo	Mexico	455.60	4	445.15	9	464.10	6
7	Matthieu Rosset	France	433.00	10	445.25	8	455.45	7
8	Jack Laugher	Great Britain	405.05	18	436.60	11	453.50	8
9	Javier Illana García	Spain	427.95	11	435.50	12	429.00	9
10	Julián Sánchez	Mexico	435.25	8	467.15	4	408.60	10
11	Bryan Nickson	Malaysia	426.75	12	442.70	10	404.90	11
12	Oleksiy Pryhorov	Ukraine	408.35	17	448.25	6	399.30	12
13	Sho Sakai	Japan	438.15	7	430.85	13		
14	Ken Terauchi	Japan	444.75	5	426.70	14		
15	Patrick Hausding	Germany	422.30	14	408.70	15		
16	Stephan Feck	Germany	419.95	15	405.90	16		
17	Dmytro Mezhenskyi	Ukraine	415.90	16	396.20	17		
18	Sebastián Villa	Colombia	425.30	13	375.80	18		
19	Constantin Blaha	Austria	392.90	19				
20	Tommaso Marconi	Italy	391.05	20				
21	Alexandros Manos	Greece	390.75	21				
22	Reuben Ross	Canada	388.15	22				
23	César Castro	Brazil	388.05	23				
24	Eirik Valheim	Norway	387.70	24				
25	Yeoh Ken Nee	Malaysia	385.80	25				
26	Michele Benedetti	Italy	384.60	26				
27	Grant Nel	Australia	383.95	27				
28	Stefanos Paparounas	Greece	379.20	28				
29	François Imbeau-Dulac	Canada	376.40	29				
30	Chris Mears	Great Britain	371.10	30				
31	Kristian Ipsen	United States	370.60	31				
32	Jorge Luis Pupo	Cuba	367.10	32				
33	Ville Vahtola	Finland	364.80	33				
34	Espen Valheim	Norway	363.05	34				
35	Andrzej Rzeszutek	Poland	359.75	35				
36	Chola Chanturia	Georgia	356.45	36				
37	Yorick de Bruijn	Netherlands	355.25	37				
38	Damien Cely	France	354.70	38				
39	Edickson Contreras	Venezuela	342.10	39				
40	Jonathan Joernfalk	Sweden	339.45	40				
41	Ramon de Meijer	Netherlands	335.55	41				
42	Alexander Andresen	Sweden	328.85	42				
43	René Hernández	Cuba	327.90	43				
44	Shota Korakhashvili	Georgia	313.50	44				
45	Diego Carquin	Chile	312.90	45				
46	Ignas Barkauskas	Lithuania	304.15	46				
47	Sergej Baziuk	Lithuania	301.20	47				
48	Andrea Aloisio	Switzerland	300.10	48				
49	Dmitriy Sorokin	Azerbaijan	272.10	49				
50	Jason Poon	Hong Kong	270.05	50				
51	Rashid Al-Harbi	Kuwait	250.35	51				
52	Farid Gurbanov	Azerbaijan	231.50	52				
