= Diving at the 2011 World Aquatics Championships – Men's 1 metre springboard =

Men's 1 metre springboard at the Diving at the 2011 World Aquatics Championships
- Dates: 16–18 July
- Competitors: 39 from 25 nations
- Winning points: 463.90

Medalists
gold medal	Li Shixin	China
silver medal	He Min	China
bronze medal	Pavlo Rozenberg	Germany

The men's 1 metre springboard competition of the diving events at the 2011 World Aquatics Championships was held on July 16 (preliminary round) and 18 (final).

== Medalists ==
Gold	Silver	Bronze
Li Shixin; China	He Min; China	Pavlo Rozenberg; Germany

== Results ==
The preliminary round was held on July 16 at 10:00 local time. The final was held on July 18 at 14:00.

Green denotes finalists

Rank	Diver	Nationality	Preliminary		Final	
Rank	Diver	Nationality	Points	Rank	Points	Rank
1st place, gold medalist(s)	Li Shixin	China	438.00	1	463.90	1
2nd place, silver medalist(s)	He Min	China	432.95	2	444.00	2
3rd place, bronze medalist(s)	Pavlo Rozenberg	Germany	385.40	6	436.50	3
4	Chris Colwill	United States	387.80	5	427.15	4
5	Javier Illana	Spain	408.45	3	402.40	5
6	Reuben Ross	Canada	378.50	7	401.40	6
7	Evgeny Kuznetsov	Russia	378.25	8	388.10	7
8	Andrzej Rzeszutek	Poland	369.60	10	368.95	8
9	Aaron Fleshner	United States	373.20	9	364.60	9
10	Amund Gismervik	Norway	362.90	12	346.65	10
11	Daniel Islas	Mexico	393.85	4	307.35	11
12	Alexander Andersen	Sweden	363.95	11	282.15	12
13	Oleksandr Gorshkovozov	Ukraine	361.75	13		
14	Chris Mears	Great Britain	361.20	14		
15	Damien Cely	France	352.40	15		
16	Oleksiy Pryhorov	Ukraine	352.30	16		
17	Sebastián Villa	Colombia	349.30	17		
18	Stefanos Paparounas	Greece	347.50	18		
19	Grant Nel	Australia	340.85	19		
20	Alexandros Manos	Greece	340.50	20		
21	Matthieu Rosset	France	337.95	21		
22	Jonathan Jörnfalk	Sweden	335.35	22		
23	Tommaso Rinaldi	Italy	332.65	23		
24	Ville Vahtola	Finland	321.95	24		
25	Francois Imbeau Dulac	Canada	312.95	25		
26	Andrea Aloisio	Switzerland	309.70	26		
27	Kevin Chavez	Mexico	308.85	27		
28	Igor Koriakin	Russia	291.95	28		
29	Yorick de Bruijn	Netherlands	288.20	29		
30	Constantin Blaha	Austria	287.95	30		
31	Stephan Feck	Germany	283.95	31		
32	Hamad Saleh	Kuwait	282.55	32		
33	Jack Laugher	Great Britain	279.55	33		
34	Poon Wai Chong Jason	Hong Kong	256.00	34		
35	Eirik Valheim	Norway	253.35	35		
36	Diego Carquin	Chile	250.85	36		
37	Donato Neglia	Chile	238.55	37		
38	Luthfi Niko Abdillah	Indonesia	236.20	38		
39	Chow Ho Wing	Hong Kong	236.10	39		
