= 2011 World Aquatics Championships =

14th FINA World Championships

14th FINA World Championships
- Host city: Shanghai, China
- Date: 16–31 July 2011
- Venue: Shanghai Oriental Sports Center
- Nations: 181
- Athletes: 2220
- Opened by: Yu Zhengsheng
- Closed by: Julio Maglione

The 14th FINA World Championships (Chinese: 2011年世界游泳锦标赛) were held on 16–31 July 2011 in Shanghai, China at the Shanghai Oriental Sports Center. The 2011 World Championships featured five aquatics disciplines: swimming, water polo, diving, open water, and synchronized swimming. At this championships, synchronized swimmer Natalia Ishchenko, of Russia, was the most decorated competitor winning all six gold medals of her events, at solo, duet and team routines. These championships served as qualifying stages for the 2012 Summer Olympics.

FINA announced Shanghai as the host on 24 March 2007, over other finalist Doha, Qatar.

== Schedule ==
| 1 | Number of finals |
| ● | Other competitions |

All dates are CST (UTC+8)

| July 2011 | 16 Sat | 17 Sun | 18 Mon | 19 Tue | 20 Wed | 21 Thu | 22 Fri | 23 Sat | 24 Sun | 25 Mon | 26 Tue | 27 Wed | 28 Thu | 29 Fri | 30 Sat | 31 Sun | Gold medals |
|---|---|---|---|---|---|---|---|---|---|---|---|---|---|---|---|---|---|
| Diving | 1 | 1 | 2 | 2 | ● | 1 | 1 | 1 | 1 | | | | | | | | 10 |
| Open water swimming | | | | 1 | 1 | 1 | 2 | 2 | | | | | | | | | 7 |
| Swimming | | | | | | | | | 4 | 4 | 5 | 4 | 5 | 5 | 6 | 7 | 40 |
| Synchronised swimming | | 1 | 1 | 1 | 1 | 1 | 1 | 1 | | | | | | | | | 7 |
| Water polo | | ● | ● | ● | ● | ● | ● | ● | ● | ● | ● | ● | ● | 1 | 1 | | 2 |
| Total gold medals | 1 | 2 | 3 | 4 | 2 | 3 | 4 | 4 | 5 | 4 | 5 | 4 | 5 | 6 | 7 | 7 | 66 |
| Cumulative total | 1 | 3 | 6 | 10 | 12 | 15 | 19 | 23 | 28 | 32 | 37 | 41 | 46 | 52 | 59 | 66 | |

== Medal table ==
* Host Nation

* Host nation (China)

| Rank | Nation | Gold | Silver | Bronze | Total |
|---|---|---|---|---|---|
| 1 | United States | 17 | 6 | 9 | 32 |
| 2 | China* | 15 | 13 | 8 | 36 |
| 3 | Russia | 8 | 6 | 4 | 18 |
| 4 | Brazil | 4 | 0 | 0 | 4 |
| 5 | Italy | 3 | 4 | 2 | 9 |
| 6 | Great Britain | 3 | 3 | 0 | 6 |
| 7 | Australia | 2 | 10 | 4 | 16 |
| 8 | France | 2 | 4 | 5 | 11 |
| 9 | Netherlands | 2 | 1 | 3 | 6 |
| 10 | Greece | 2 | 1 | 1 | 4 |
| 11 | Denmark | 2 | 1 | 0 | 3 |
| 12 | Germany | 1 | 3 | 9 | 13 |
| 13 | Sweden | 1 | 1 | 0 | 2 |
| 14 | Hungary | 1 | 0 | 4 | 5 |
| 15 | Belarus | 1 | 0 | 0 | 1 |
| 15 | Bulgaria | 1 | 0 | 0 | 1 |
| 15 | Norway | 1 | 0 | 0 | 1 |
| 15 | South Korea | 1 | 0 | 0 | 1 |
| 15 | Switzerland | 1 | 0 | 0 | 1 |
| 20 | Canada | 0 | 4 | 3 | 7 |
| 21 | Japan | 0 | 4 | 2 | 6 |
| 22 | Spain | 0 | 1 | 5 | 6 |
| 23 | Poland | 0 | 1 | 0 | 1 |
| 23 | Serbia | 0 | 1 | 0 | 1 |
| 25 | South Africa | 0 | 0 | 3 | 3 |
| 26 | Mexico | 0 | 0 | 2 | 2 |
| 27 | Croatia | 0 | 0 | 1 | 1 |
| 27 | Ukraine | 0 | 0 | 1 | 1 |
| Totals (28 entries) | | 68 | 64 | 66 | 198 |

== Competition ==
=== Diving ===
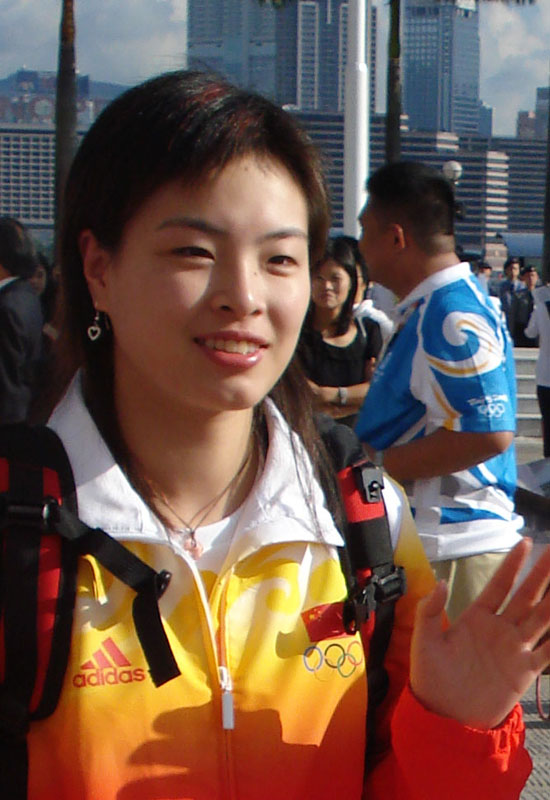
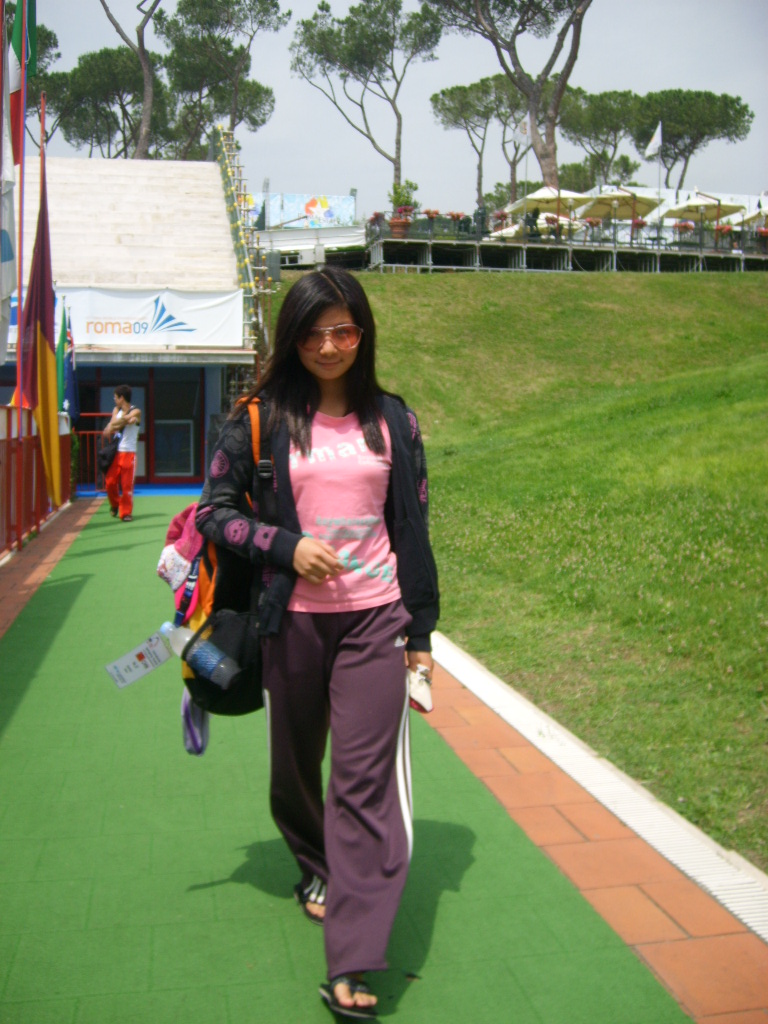
Teaming in the women's 3 m synchro springboard, Wu Minxia (left) and He Zi (right) won the first gold medal in the competition.

The diving program consisted of 10 events (5 male and 5 female). Diving was contested at the Shanghai Oriental Sports Center from July 16–24. China came out on top in the gold medal count in the diving swimming competition with ten golds, winning all events.

On the first day of competition on July 16, host nation China won the first gold medal of the meet in the women's 3 m synchro springboard. The duo of Wu Minxia and He Zi had a score of 356.40 to win by more than 40 points ahead of Canadians Émilie Heymans and Jennifer Abel. On the second day of competition, the Chinese duo of Qiu Bo and Huo Liang won gold in the men's 10 m synchro platform with a score of 480.03. On the third day of competition, two finals were held. In the men's 1 m springboard, China continued its strong performance with a 1-2 finish, with Li Shixin winning the gold and He Min winning the silver. In the women's 10 m synchro platform, the Chinese duo of Wang Hao and Chen Ruolin won gold with a score of 362.58 points. On the fourth day of competition, two finals were held and China continued its dominance. In the women's 1 m springboard, China finished 1-2 with Shi Tingmao winning the gold and Wang Han taking the silver. In the men's 3 m synchro springboard, the Chinese duo of Qin Kai and Luo Yutong won the gold with a score of 463.98. On the fifth day of competition, China swept the women's 10 m platform, with Chen Ruolin winning the gold and Hu Yadan winning the silver. On the sixth day of competition, China won gold in the men's 3 m springboard. However, it was the first individual event in the diving competition in which China did not go 1-2, with Russian diver Ilya Zakharov taking the silver. On the seventh day of competition, China won gold in the women's 3 m springboard with Wu Minxia taking the gold and He Zi winning the silver. On the eight and last day of competition, China won gold in the men's 10 m platform. In winning this event, China won all the possible golds in the diving competition.

=== Open water swimming ===
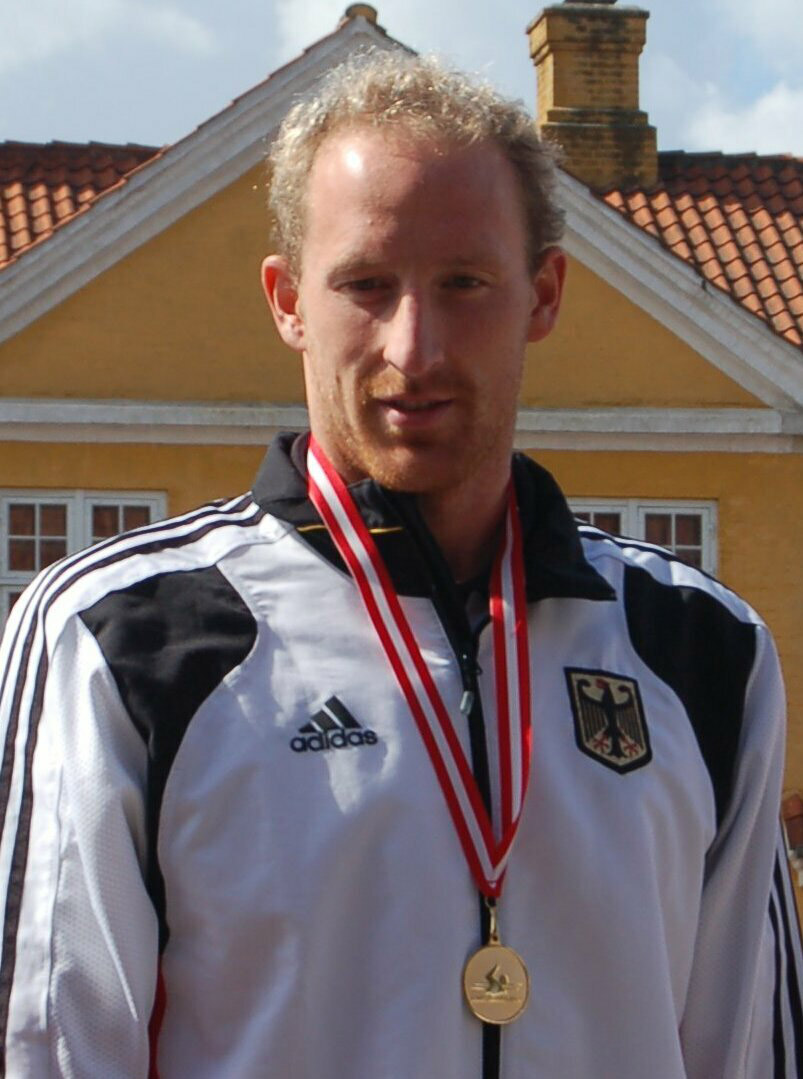
Lurz was the most decorated open water swimmer with three medals.

The open water swimming competition featured 7 events (3 male, 3 female, and a mixed team competition). The open water swimming competition was contested at the Jinshan City Beach from July 19–23. Germany came out on top in the gold medal count in the open water swimming competition with one gold, two silvers, and one bronze.

On the first day of competition on July 19, British Keri-Anne Payne won the first gold of the open water competition in the women's 10 km. On the second day of competition, Greek Spyridon Gianniotis won the gold in the men's 10 km, finishing ahead of German Thomas Lurz. On the third day of competition, the American threesome of Andrew Gemmell, Ashley Twichell and Sean Ryan won gold in the 5 km team event in a tallied time of 57:00.6. On the fourth day of competition, two events were held, the women's and men's 5 km. In the women's 5 km, Swiss Swann Oberson won the gold in a time of 1:00:39.7. In the men's 5 km, German Thomas Lurz won gold in a time of 56:16.2. On the fifth and last day of competition, two events were held, the men's and women's 25 km. In the men's 25 km, Bulgarian Petar Stoychev won the gold in a time of 5:10:39.8. In the women's 25 km, Brazilian Ana Marcela Cunha won the gold in a time of 5:29:22.9. Four women and 10 men who started the 25 km competition did not complete the race because water temperatures reached what FINA says is an unsafe level for competition.

=== Swimming ===
The swimming competition featured races in a long course (50 m) pool in 40 events (20 for males, 20 for females; 17 individual events and 3 relays for each gender). The events were held at the Shanghai Oriental Sports Center from July 24–31. The United States lead the gold medal count in the swimming competition with sixteen golds. Overall, the United States came out on top in the swimming competition with twenty-nine medals. A total of two world records were set during the swimming competition. Just two years ago, at the 2009 World Aquatics Championships in Rome, 43 world records were set. This is attributed to high-tech bodysuits being banned in January 2010.

American Ryan Lochte won the most gold medals among the male competitors with five and was named the best male swimmer of the championships. American Rebecca Soni won a total of three golds and one bronze medal and was named the best female swimmer of the championships. American Michael Phelps had the most overall medals in the competition with seven (four golds, two silvers, one bronze).

==== Day one ====
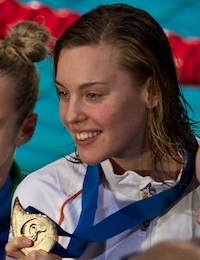
Heemskerk had a 52.46 split to overcome to Americans in the 4×100 m freestyle relay on day one.

On the first day of competition on July 24, four finals were contested, the women's and men's 400 m freestyle and women's and men's 4×100 m freestyle relay. In the women's 400 m freestyle, Italian Federica Pellegrini successfully defended her 2009 crown and crushed the field to win gold in a time of 4:01.97, over two seconds ahead of British Rebecca Adlington. In the men's 400 m freestyle, Korean Park Tae-Hwan won the gold in a time of 3:42.04, over one second ahead of second-place finisher Chinese Sun Yang. After the 400 m freestyle event was the women's and men's 4×100 m freestyle relay. In the women's 4×100 m freestyle relay, the Dutch team of Inge Dekker, Ranomi Kromowidjojo, Marleen Veldhuis, and Femke Heemskerk finished ahead of the United States 3:33.96 to 3:34.47. Because of Heemskerk's 100 m split of 52.46, the Dutch were able to overcome the United States on the final leg. Next in the men's 4×100 m freestyle relay, the Australian team of James Magnussen, Matthew Targett, Matthew Abood, and Eamon Sullivan won the gold in a time of 3:11.00. Magnussen jolted the Australians ahead in the first leg with a split of 47.49. American Michael Phelps (whose team finished third) had the second-best start with a 48.08. After the race, Phelps said of Magnussen, "He's talented, he's young. I think it's going to make it exciting for the sport and add something else to that relay, that's for sure." No new world or competition records were set during day one.

==== Day two ====
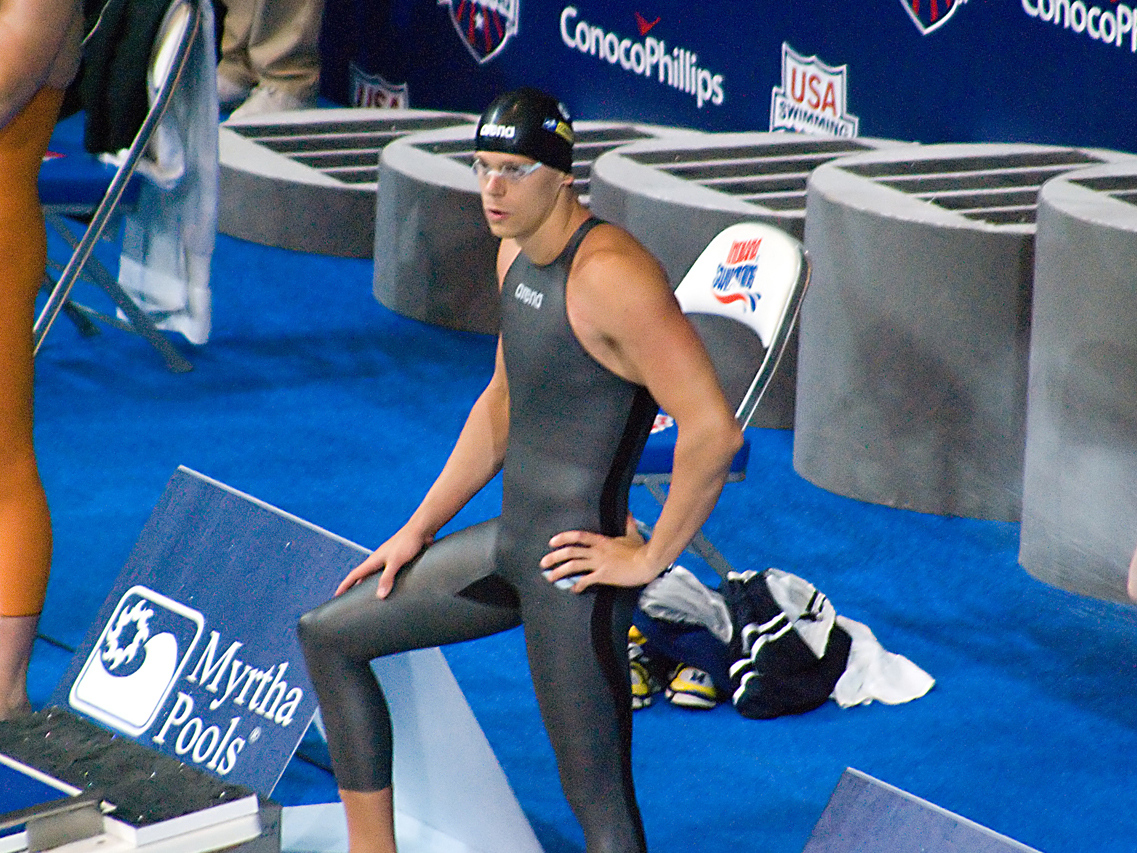
Cielo won gold in the 50 m butterfly on day two.

On the second day of competition on July 25, four finals were contested, the women's 100 m butterfly, men's 50 m butterfly, women's 200 m individual medley, and the men's 100 m breaststroke. In the first final of day two, the women's 100 m butterfly, American Dana Vollmer won the gold after posting the top times in the heats and semifinals. Vollmer's winning time of 56.87 was slower than her semifinal time of 56.47 but was still good enough for gold. In the men's 50 m butterfly, Brazilian César Cielo, just recently cleared to compete after failing a drug test, won in a time of 23.10. Cielo was very emotional after the race and sobbed uncontrollably. After he said, "This gold medal has a different feel from the other ones. This one was the hardest of my life." In the women's 200 m individual medley, fifteen-year-old Chinese Ye Shiwen won the gold in a time of 2:08.90 to give host nation China its first gold in the swimming competition. At the 150 mark, Ye was in fifth place but covered the last 50 metres in 29.42 to surge ahead of American Ariana Kukors and Australian Alicia Coutts for the win. In the men's 100 m breaststroke Norwegian Alexander Dale Oen won the gold in a time of 58.71. After the race, he pointed to the Norwegian flag on his swimming cap in reference to the 2011 Norway attacks. No new world or competition records were set during day two.

==== Day three ====
On the third day of competition on July 26, five finals were contested, the men's 200 m freestyle, women's 100 m backstroke, women's 1500 m freestyle, men's 100 m backstroke, and the women's 100 m breaststroke. In the first final of day three, the men's 200 m freestyle, American Ryan Lochte won gold in a time of 1:44.44. Fellow American Michael Phelps won the silver with a time of 1:44.79, his second consecutive silver in the event at a World Aquatics Championships. In the women's 100 m backstroke, Chinese Zhao Jing won the gold in a time of 59.05, just 1/100 of a second ahead of Russian Anastasia Zuyeva. In the women's 1500 m freestyle, Dane Lotte Friis won the gold in 15:55.60, improving on her second-place finish in the event two year ago. In the men's 100 m backstroke, Frenchmen Camille Lacourt and Jérémy Stravius had matching times of 52.76 to win gold. In the women's 100 m breaststroke, American Rebecca Soni dominated the field to win in a time of 1:05.05, over a second ahead of second-place finisher Leisel Jones. No new world or competition records were set during day three.

==== Day four ====
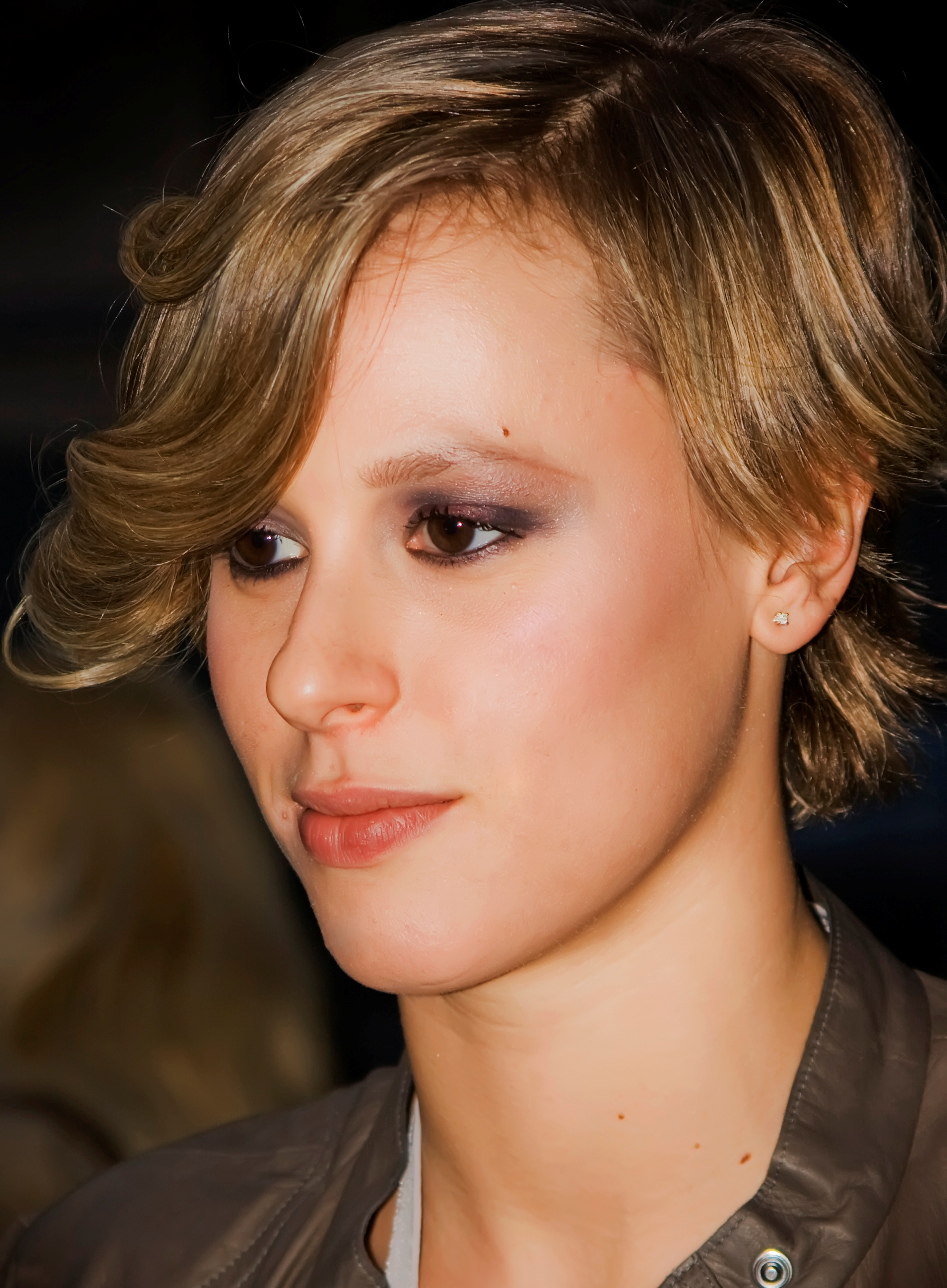
Pellegrini won her second individual gold medal in the 200 m freestyle on day four.

On the fourth day of competition on July 27, four finals were contested, the men's 200 m butterfly, women's 200 m freestyle, men's 800 m freestyle, and the men's 50 m breaststroke. In the first final of day four, the men's 200 m butterfly, American Michael Phelps won the gold with a time of 1:53.34, becoming the first swimmer to win five gold medals in one discipline at the World Aquatics Championships. In the women's 200 m freestyle, Italian Federica Pellegrini won her second gold medal of the meet and successfully defended her 2009 crown. In the men's 800 m freestyle, Chinese Sun Yang won his first ever world title with a time of 7:38.57. In the men's 50 m breaststroke, Brazilian Felipe França Silva won the gold in a time of 27.01. However, it was not without controversy as video showed Silva performed an illegal dolphin kick at the finish of the race. No new world or competition records were set during day four.

==== Day five ====
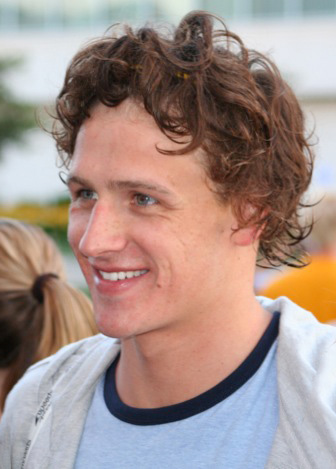
Lochte set the first world record in the competition on day five.

On the fifth day of competition on July 28, five finals were contested, the men's 200 m individual medley, men's 100 m freestyle, women's 200 m butterfly, women's 50 m backstroke, and the women's 4×200 m freestyle relay. In the first final of day five, the men's 200 m individual medley, American Ryan Lochte set the first world record of the competition en route to winning gold with a time of 1:54.00 and successfully defended his 2009 title. After the race, Lochte said, "All I can say is summed up in one word ... Jeah! That's really all." American Michael Phelps finished second in 1:54.16. In the men's 100 m freestyle, Australian James Magnussen continued his strong performance with gold in a time of 47.63, becoming the first Australian man to win the event. After the race, Magnussen said, "When I get back to Australia, I will be relaxing with my friends, and it will sound amazing to be called a world champion. It has been six weeks since I have gotten a good night's sleep. No Australian has won this race at the world championships before, so it is good to be in the same club as the legends of this sport." Defending champion César Cielo finished in fourth place after fading badly the last 15 meters with a time of 48.01. In the women's 200 m butterfly, Chinese Jiao Liuyang won her first individual world title with a time of 2:05.55, just holding off Brit Ellen Gandy who finished second in 2:05.59. In the women's 50 m backstroke, Russian Anastasia Zuyeva won the gold in a time of 27.79. In the women's 4×200 m freestyle relay, the American team of Missy Franklin, Dagny Knutson, Katie Hoff, and Allison Schmitt won the gold with a time of 7:46.14. Leading off the relay, the sixteen-year-old Franklin recorded a time of 1:55.06, which was fast enough to win the individual 200 m freestyle (won in 1:55.58). One world record, set by Lochte in the 200 m individual medley, was set during day five.

==== Day six ====
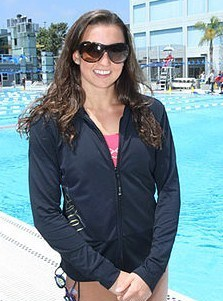
Soni won her second individual gold medal in the 200 m breaststroke on day six.

On the sixth day of competition on July 29, five finals were contested, the women's 100 m freestyle, men's 200 m backstroke, women's 200 m breaststroke, men's 200 m breaststroke, and the men's 4×200 m freestyle relay. In the first final of day six, the women's 100 m freestyle, Dane Jeanette Ottesen and Belarusian Aleksandra Gerasimenya tied for the gold medal with a time of 53.45. For Ottesen and Gerasimenya, it is the first ever individual world titles for them. In the men's 200 m backstroke, American Ryan Lochte continued his strong performance with a winning time of 1:52.96. Japanese Ryosuke Irie finished second in 1:54.11. In the women's 200 m breaststroke, American Rebecca Soni won her second gold medal of the meet with a time of 2:21.47, slower than her semifinal time of 2:21.03, but still comfortably ahead of Russian Yuliya Yefimova who finished in 2:22.22. In the men's 200 m breaststroke, Hungarian Dániel Gyurta successfully defended his 2009 title with a time of 2:08.41. Throughout the race, Japanese Kosuke Kitajima lead the way and at 150 metre mark was leading Gyurta 1:34.22 to 1:34.71. However, Gyurta had superior comeback in the final 50 metres to overtake Kitajima for the win. Kitajima ended up second with a time of 2:08.63. In the final event of day six, the men's 4×200 m freestyle relay, the American team of Michael Phelps, Peter Vanderkaay, Ricky Berens, and Ryan Lochte won the gold with a time of 7:02.67. At the 600 metre mark, the American team was trailing France 5:18.11 to 5:17.46. However, Lochte had a split of 1:44.56 to win it for the Americans. France's last leg, Fabien Gilot could not keep up with Lochte and recorded a time of 1:47.35. France's final time was 7:04.81. Notably, China's relay team finished in third place with a time of 7:05.67, its first ever medal in the event. No new world or competition records were set during day six.

==== Day seven ====
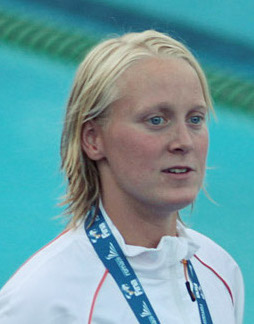
Dekker won the women's 50 m butterfly on day seven.

On the seventh day of competition on July 30, six finals were contested, the women's 50 m butterfly, men's 50 m freestyle, women's 200 m backstroke, men's 100 m butterfly, women's 800 m freestyle, and the women's 4×100 m medley relay. In the first final of day seven, the women's 50 m butterfly, Dutch swimmer Inge Dekker pulled an upset and won the gold ahead world record holder Therese Alshammar 25.71 to 25.76. In the men's 50 m freestyle, Brazilian César Cielo successfully defended his 2009 title with a win in a time of 21.52. In the women's 200 m backstroke, American Missy Franklin dominated the competition with a national record time of 2:05.10, almost a second ahead of second-place finisher Belinda Hocking and nearly breaking the world record set in 2009. Franklin's time of 2:05.10 is the third-fastest ever in the event. In the men's 100 m butterfly, American Michael Phelps won the expected gold in a time of 50.71, his third consecutive title in the event (also winning in 2007 and 2009) and second individual title of the meet. In the women's 800 m freestyle, Brit Rebecca Adlington was able to hold off Dane Lotte Friis for the win with a time of 8:17.51. Friis finished second with a time of 8:18.20. In the final event of day seven, the women's 4×100 m medley relay, the American team of Natalie Coughlin, Rebecca Soni, Dana Vollmer, and Missy Franklin won the gold with a time of 3:52.36, over three seconds ahead of second-place finisher China. Their time was the second-fastest of all time and was just outside the Chinese owned world record of 3:52.19 from 2009. It was the first title for the American team since 1998. Notably, Franklin, who had just completed the 200 m backstroke, completed the freestyle leg in the medley relay in 52.79, the fastest freestyle leg in the field. No new world or competition records were set during day seven.

==== Day eight ====
On the eighth day of competition on July 31, seven finals were contested, the women's 50 m breaststroke, men's 400 m individual medley, women's 50 m freestyle, men's 50 m backstroke, men's 1500 m freestyle, women's 400 m individual medley, and the men's 4×100 m medley relay. In the first final of day eight, the women's 50 m breaststroke, American Jessica Hardy outtouched Russian Yuliya Yefimova for the gold medal 30.19 to 30.49. American Rebecca Soni finished third in the race with a time of 30.58. In the men's 400 m individual medley, American Ryan Lochte won by over four seconds with a time of 4:07.13. It was Lochte's sixth medal of the competition and his fifth gold. After the race, Lochte said, "I'm so glad this meet is over ... It has been a long, long eight days. For the most part, I'm not really happy. I mean, it's definitely great to have won five golds, but I know I can go a lot faster." American Tyler Clary earned a silver behind Lochte, repeating his 2009 result. In the women's 50 m freestyle, Swede Therese Alshammar won the gold in a time of 24.14. Dutch swimmers Ranomi Kromowidjojo (24.27) and Marleen Veldhuis (24.49) finished third and fourth, respectively. At 33, Alshammar is the oldest female world champion in history. In the men's 50 m backstroke, Brit Liam Tancock successfully defended his 2009 title with a time of 24.50. Tancock was pleased with the result but second-place finisher Camille Lacourt of France said, "I'm not happy with the result ... That was a good chance for me to grab a gold. I will work hard to prepare for next year's Olympics." In the men's 1500 m freestyle, Chinese Sun Yang set the second world record of the competition en route to winning gold with a time of 14:34.14, improving Australian Grant Hackett's 2001 record of 14:34.56 and improving on the bronze medal he got two years ago. After the race, Sun said, "With the London Games a year out, I will have to be more strict with myself and start back at zero. Hopefully, I can create miracles at the Olympics." Prior to this, Hackett's record was the longest standing record unbroken even with the "supersuits" of 2009. In the women's 400 m individual medley, American Elizabeth Beisel won her first ever world championship gold with a time of 4:31.78. Second-place finisher Brit Hannah Miley finished over two seconds behind with a time of 4:34.22. In the final event of day eight, the men's 4×100 m medley relay, the American team of Nick Thoman, Mark Gangloff, Michael Phelps, and Nathan Adrian won the gold with a time of 3:32.06. At the 300 metre mark, the Australian team was in fourth place but James Magnussen has a split of 47.00 to get his team second place in 3:32.26. One world record, set by Sun in the 1500 m freestyle, was set during day eight.

==== World records ====
The following world records were established during the competition:

| Date | Event | Time | Name | Nation |
|---|---|---|---|---|
| July 28, 2011 | Men's 200 m individual medley final | 1:54.00 | Ryan Lochte | United States |
| July 31, 2011 | Men's 1500 m freestyle final | 14:34.14 | Sun Yang | China |

=== Synchronised swimming ===
The synchronised swimming events were held at the Shanghai Oriental Sports Center from July 17–23. Russia came out on top in the gold medal count in the synchronised swimming competition with seven golds, winning all events.

On the first day of the synchronised swimming competition on July 17, Russia took the first gold in the solo technical routine, with Natalia Ishchenko winning with a score of 98.300. On the second day of competition, Russia picked up its second gold in the duet technical routine, with Natalia Ishchenko and Svetlana Romashina winning gold with a score of 98.200. On day three of the synchronised swimming competition, Russia continued its strong performance with gold in the team technical routine with 98.300 points. On the fourth day of competition, Russia continued its dominance with Natalia Ishchenko picking up her third gold medal in the solo free routine. On the fifth day of competition, Russia won its fifth gold in the free routine combination and Natalia Ishchenko won her fourth individual gold, while Canada won its first medal. On the sixth day of competition, Russian Natalia Ishchenko and Svetlana Romashina won gold in the duet free routine. Also, Ishchenko won her fifth individual gold of the competition. On the seventh and last day of competition, Russia won gold in the team free routine with a score of 98.620 and Ishchenko won her sixth individual gold.

=== Water polo ===
The water polo events were held at the Shanghai Oriental Sports Center from July 17–30. In the men's tournament, Italy upset the defending champions Serbia for the gold. In the women's tournament, Greece won the gold over China.

== Participating nations ==
181 nations have entered at least one athlete in one of the five disciplines; diving, open water swimming, swimming, synchronized swimming, and water polo.

- Albania (3)
- Algeria (2)
- American Samoa (3)
- Andorra (3)
- Angola (3)
- Antigua and Barbuda (3)
- Argentina (13)
- Armenia (4)
- Aruba (3)
- Australia (97)
- Austria (16)
- Azerbaijan (8)
- Bahamas (3)
- Bahrain (3)
- Bangladesh (2)
- Barbados (1)
- Belarus (12)
- Belgium (10)
- Benin (3)
- Bermuda (3)
- Bolivia (3)
- Bosnia and Herzegovina (3)
- Botswana (2)
- Brazil (65)
- Brunei (2)
- Bulgaria (6)
- Burkina Faso (3)
- Burundi (3)
- Cambodia (3)
- Cameroon (2)
- Canada (86)
- Cayman Islands (2)
- Central African Republic (3)
- Chile (6)
- China (110) ( Host )
- Chinese Taipei (4)
- Colombia (19)
- Comoros (3)
- Republic of the Congo (3)
- Cook Islands (3)
- Costa Rica (8)
- Ivory Coast (3)
- Croatia (33)
- Cuba (27)
- Cyprus (3)
- Czech Republic (16)
- Denmark (6)
- Djibouti (3)
- Dominican Republic (3)
- Democratic Republic of the Congo (3)
- Ecuador (6)
- Egypt (17)
- El Salvador (3)
- Estonia (6)
- Ethiopia (3)
- Faroe Islands (1)
- Fiji (3)
- Finland (7)
- France (44)
- The Gambia (3)
- Georgia (4)
- Germany (57)
- Ghana (1)
- Great Britain (63)
- Greece (31)
- Grenada (2)
- Guam (3)
- Guatemala (4)
- Guinea (3)
- Guyana (3)
- Honduras (4)
- Hong Kong (23)
- Hungary (50)
- Iceland (7)
- India (5)
- Indonesia (25)
- Iran (3)
- Iraq (2)
- Ireland (6)
- Israel (11)
- Italy (82)
- Jamaica (2)
- Japan (61)
- Jordan (3)
- Kazakhstan (42)
- Kenya (3)
- Kuwait (4)
- Kyrgyzstan (3)
- Laos (2)
- Latvia (3)
- Lebanon (3)
- Lesotho (3)
- Libya (1)
- Liechtenstein (1)
- Lithuania (7)
- Luxembourg (3)
- Macau (18)
- Macedonia (2)
- Madagascar (3)
- Malaysia (22)
- Maldives (3)
- Mali (3)
- Malta (3)
- Marshall Islands (3)
- Mauritania (3)
- Mauritius (3)
- Mexico (37)
- Federated States of Micronesia (3)
- Moldova (3)
- Monaco (2)
- Mongolia (3)
- Montenegro (13)
- Morocco (3)
- Mozambique (3)
- Namibia (3)
- Nepal (3)
- Netherlands (43)
- Netherlands Antilles (1)
- New Zealand (27)
- Nicaragua (3)
- Niger (3)
- Nigeria (3)
- North Korea (14)
- Northern Mariana Islands (3)
- Norway (7)
- Oman (4)
- Pakistan (3)
- Palau (3)
- Palestine (3)
- Panama (3)
- Papua New Guinea (3)
- Paraguay (3)
- Peru (3)
- Philippines (3)
- Poland (13)
- Portugal (8)
- Puerto Rico (3)
- Qatar (2)
- Romania (17)
- Russia (76)
- Rwanda (4)
- Saint Lucia (3)
- Saint Vincent and the Grenadines (1)
- San Marino (5)
- Senegal (3)
- Serbia (21)
- Seychelles (3)
- Singapore (15)
- Slovakia (7)
- Slovenia (14)
- South Africa (67)
- South Korea (20)
- Spain (54)
- Sri Lanka (3)
- Sudan (3)
- Suriname (3)
- Swaziland (1)
- Sweden (25)
- Switzerland (17)
- Syria (4)
- Tahiti (3)
- Tajikistan (3)
- Tanzania (3)
- Thailand (15)
- Togo (2)
- Tonga (2)
- Trinidad and Tobago (3)
- Tunisia (4)
- Turkey (9)
- Turkmenistan (3)
- Uganda (3)
- Ukraine (37)
- United Arab Emirates (2)
- United States (101)
- Uruguay (3)
- Uzbekistan (19)
- Venezuela (21)
- Vietnam (3)
- Virgin Islands (1)
- Zambia (3)
- Zimbabwe (5)

== See also ==
- List of World Championships records in swimming
