= Norway at the 2011 World Aquatics Championships =

Sporting event delegation

Flag of Norway

Norway competed at the 2011 World Aquatics Championships in Shanghai, China between July 16 and 31, 2011.

== Medalists ==
Medal	Name	Sport	Event	Date
Gold	Alexander Dale Oen	Swimming	Men's 100m Breaststroke	25 July

== Diving ==
Norway has qualified 3 athletes in diving.

Men

Athlete	Event	Preliminary		Semifinals		Final	
Athlete	Event	Points	Rank	Points	Rank	Points	Rank
Eirik Valheim	Men's 1m Springboard	253.35	35			did not advance	
Eirik Valheim	Men's 3m Springboard	387.70	24	did not advance			
Amund Gismervik	Men's 1m Springboard	362.90	12 Q			346.65	10
Amund Gismervik	Men's 10m Platform	319.75	33	did not advance			
Espen Valheim	Men's 3m Springboard	363.05	34	did not advance			
Eirik Valheim; Espen Valheim	Men's 3m Synchro Springboard	355.17	11 Q			379.74	11

== Swimming ==
Norway qualified 4 swimmers.

Men

Athlete	Event	Heats		Semifinals		Final	
Athlete	Event	Time	Rank	Time	Rank	Time	Rank
Alexander Dale Oen	Men's 50m Breaststroke	27.51	5 Q	27.33	3 Q	27.43	5
Alexander Dale Oen	Men's 100m Breaststroke	59.71	1 Q	59.37	1 Q	58.71	Gold medal
Alexander Dale Oen	Men's 200m Breaststroke	DNS		did not advance			

Women

Athlete	Event	Heats		Semifinals		Final	
Athlete	Event	Time	Rank	Time	Rank	Time	Rank
Cecilie Johannessen	Women's 50m Freestyle	26.14	31	did not advance			
Cecilie Johannessen	Women's 200m Freestyle	2:00.56	29	did not advance			
Cecilie Johannessen	Women's 400m Freestyle	4:18.84	27			did not advance	
Sara Nordenstam	Women's 100m Breaststroke	1:11.33	31	did not advance			
Sara Nordenstam	Women's 200m Breaststroke	2:28.88	21	did not advance			
Sara Nordenstam	Women's 200m Butterfly	2:16.09	28	did not advance			
Ingvild Snildal	Women's 50m Butterfly	27.01	20	did not advance			
Ingvild Snildal	Women's 100m Butterfly	59.80	28	did not advance			
