= Swimming at the 2011 World Aquatics Championships – Women's 100 metre backstroke =

Women's 100 metre backstroke at the 2011 World Aquatics Championships
- Dates: July 25, 2011 (heats and semifinals); July 26, 2011 (final)
- Competitors: 53 from 44 nations
- Winning time: 59.05

Medalists
| gold medal | Zhao Jing | China |
| silver medal | Anastasia Zuyeva | Russia |
| bronze medal | Natalie Coughlin | United States |

The women's 100 metre backstroke competition of the swimming events at the 2011 World Aquatics Championships were held on July 25 with the preliminary round and the semifinals and July 26 with the final.

== Records ==
Prior to the competition, the existing world and championship records were as follows.

| | Name | Nation | Time | Location | Date |
|---|---|---|---|---|---|
| World record Championship record | Gemma Spofforth | United Kingdom | 58.12 | Rome | July 28, 2009 |

== Results ==
=== Heats ===
53 swimmers participated in 7 heats, qualified swimmers are listed:

| Rank | Heat | Lane | Name | Nationality | Time | Notes |
|---|---|---|---|---|---|---|
| 1 | 6 | 3 | Natalie Coughlin | United States | 59.73 | Q |
| 2 | 7 | 2 | Sinead Russell | Canada | 59.80 | Q |
| 3 | 5 | 4 | Emily Seebohm | Australia | 59.87 | Q |
| 4 | 6 | 4 | Aya Terakawa | Japan | 59.95 | Q |
| 5 | 6 | 6 | Elizabeth Pelton | United States | 1:00.19 | Q |
| 6 | 7 | 3 | Belinda Hocking | Australia | 1:00.23 | Q |
| 7 | 5 | 3 | Shiho Sakai | Japan | 1:00.34 | Q |
| 8 | 6 | 5 | Elizabeth Simmonds | Great Britain | 1:00.38 | Q |
| 9 | 6 | 1 | Sharon van Rouwendaal | Netherlands | 1:00.61 | Q |
| 10 | 7 | 4 | Zhao Jing | China | 1:00.66 | Q |
| 11 | 5 | 6 | Julia Wilkinson | Canada | 1:00.82 | Q |
| 12 | 7 | 5 | Anastasia Zuyeva | Russia | 1:00.88 | Q |
| 13 | 5 | 2 | Duane da Rocha | Spain | 1:01.19 | Q |
| 14 | 4 | 3 | Karin Prinsloo | South Africa | 1:01.34 | Q |
| 15 | 5 | 1 | Daryna Zevina | Ukraine | 1:01.36 | Q |
| 16 | 7 | 8 | Ekaterina Avramova | Bulgaria | 1:01.39 | Q NR |
| 17 | 6 | 7 | Melissa Ingram | New Zealand | 1:01.48 | |
| 18 | 7 | 7 | Mercedes Peris | Spain | 1:01.55 | |
| 19 | 5 | 7 | Kseniya Moskvina | Russia | 1:01.59 | |
| 20 | 7 | 1 | Elena Gemo | Italy | 1:01.62 | |
| 21 | 6 | 2 | Jenny Mensing | Germany | 1:01.64 | |
| 22 | 7 | 6 | Gao Chang | China | 1:01.84 | |
| 23 | 5 | 5 | Gemma Spofforth | Great Britain | 1:01.89 | |
| 24 | 4 | 2 | Mie Nielsen | Denmark | 1:01.90 | |
| 25 | 4 | 7 | Alicja Tchorz | Poland | 1:02.04 | |
| 26 | 6 | 8 | Maria Gonzalez Ramirez | Mexico | 1:02.16 | |
| 27 | 4 | 8 | Lau Yin Yan | Hong Kong | 1:02.45 | |
| 28 | 4 | 1 | Kimberly Buys | Belgium | 1:02.48 | |
| 29 | 2 | 5 | Anja Čarman | Slovenia | 1:02.61 | |
| 30 | 4 | 5 | Simona Baumrtová | Czech Republic | 1:02.71 | |
| 31 | 3 | 1 | Sanja Jovanović | Croatia | 1:02.75 | |
| 32 | 5 | 8 | Alina Vats | Ukraine | 1:02.80 | |
| 33 | 2 | 3 | Yulduz Kuchkarova | Uzbekistan | 1:02.98 | |
| 34 | 2 | 6 | Anna Volchkov | Israel | 1:03.12 | |
| 35 | 3 | 2 | Hanna-Maria Seppälä | Finland | 1:03.18 | |
| 36 | 4 | 6 | Therese Svendsen | Sweden | 1:03.36 | |
| 37 | 3 | 5 | Melanie Nocher | Ireland | 1:03.43 | |
| 38 | 2 | 4 | Kiera Aitken | Bermuda | 1:03.59 | |
| 39 | 3 | 6 | Hazal Sarikaya | Turkey | 1:03.69 | |
| 40 | 3 | 7 | Yekaterina Rudenko | Kazakhstan | 1:03.78 | |
| 41 | 4 | 4 | Sviatlana Khakhlova | Belarus | 1:03.99 | |
| 42 | 3 | 3 | Alana Dillette | Bahamas | 1:04.27 | |
| 43 | 3 | 4 | Etiene Medeiros | Brazil | 1:05.18 | |
| 44 | 2 | 2 | Tiffany Sudarma | Indonesia | 1:05.19 | |
| 45 | 2 | 1 | Tatiana Perstneva | Moldova | 1:05.35 | |
| 46 | 2 | 7 | Monica Ramirez Abella | Andorra | 1:05.56 | |
| 47 | 1 | 4 | Ines Remarsaro | Uruguay | 1:05.73 | |
| 48 | 2 | 8 | Karen Vilorio | Honduras | 1:07.15 | |
| 49 | 3 | 8 | Shana Lim | Singapore | 1:07.23 | |
| 50 | 1 | 5 | Siona Huxley | Saint Lucia | 1:08.96 | |
| 51 | 1 | 3 | Anahit Barseghyan | Armenia | 1:08.99 | |
| 52 | 1 | 6 | Jessika Cossa | Mozambique | 1:09.74 | |
| 53 | 1 | 2 | Angelique Trinquier | Monaco | 1:11.38 | |

=== Semifinals ===
The semifinals were held at 18:46.

==== Semifinal 1 ====
| Rank | Lane | Name | Nationality | Time | Notes |
|---|---|---|---|---|---|
| 1 | 7 | Anastasia Zuyeva | Russia | 59.41 | Q |
| 2 | 2 | Zhao Jing | China | 59.44 | Q |
| 3 | 4 | Sinead Russell | Canada | 59.68 | Q, NR |
| 4 | 3 | Belinda Hocking | Australia | 59.69 | Q |
| 5 | 6 | Elizabeth Simmonds | Great Britain | 59.80 | Q |
| 6 | 5 | Aya Terakawa | Japan | 59.81 | Q |
| 7 | 8 | Ekaterina Avramova | Bulgaria | 1:01.10 | NR |
| 8 | 1 | Karin Prinsloo | South Africa | 1:01.54 | |

==== Semifinal 2 ====
| Rank | Lane | Name | Nationality | Time | Notes |
|---|---|---|---|---|---|
| 1 | 4 | Natalie Coughlin | United States | 59.38 | Q |
| 2 | 5 | Emily Seebohm | Australia | 59.54 | Q |
| 3 | 6 | Shiho Sakai | Japan | 59.94 | |
| 4 | 8 | Daryna Zevina | Ukraine | 1:00.05 | NR |
| 5 | 2 | Sharon van Rouwendaal | Netherlands | 1:00.14 | |
| 5 | 3 | Elizabeth Pelton | United States | 1:00.14 | |
| 7 | 7 | Julia Wilkinson | Canada | 1:00.35 | |
| 8 | 1 | Duane da Rocha | Spain | 1:00.55 | |

=== Final ===
The final was held at 18:11.

| Rank | Lane | Name | Nationality | Time | Notes |
|---|---|---|---|---|---|
| 1st place, gold medalist(s) | 3 | Zhao Jing | China | 59.05 | |
| 2nd place, silver medalist(s) | 5 | Anastasia Zuyeva | Russia | 59.06 | |
| 3rd place, bronze medalist(s) | 4 | Natalie Coughlin | United States | 59.15 | |
| 4 | 6 | Emily Seebohm | Australia | 59.21 | |
| 5 | 8 | Aya Terakawa | Japan | 59.35 | |
| 6 | 7 | Belinda Hocking | Australia | 59.53 | |
| 7 | 1 | Elizabeth Simmonds | Great Britain | 59.89 | |
| 8 | 2 | Sinead Russell | Canada | 1:00.20 | |
