= Mexico at the 2011 World Aquatics Championships =

Sporting event delegation

Flag of Mexico

Mexico competed at the 2011 World Aquatics Championships in Shanghai, China between July 16 and 31, 2011.

== Medalists ==
Medal	Name	Sport	Event	Date
Bronze	Julián Sánchez; Yahel Castillo	Diving	Men's 3 m Synchro Springboard	19 July
Bronze	Paola Espinosa	Diving	Women's 10m Platform	21 July

== Diving ==
Mexico has qualified 13 athletes in diving.

Men

Athlete	Event	Preliminary		Semifinals		Final	
Athlete	Event	Points	Rank	Points	Rank	Points	Rank
Kevin Chavez	Men's 1m Springboard	308.85	27			did not advance	
Daniel Islas	Men's 1m Springboard	393.85	4 Q			307.35	11
Yahel Castillo	Men's 3m Springboard	455.60	4 Q	445.15	9 Q	464.10	6
Julián Sánchez	Men's 3m Springboard	435.25	8 Q	467.15	4 Q	408.60	10
Ivan Garcia	Men's 10m Platform	475.85	6 Q	442.85	10 Q	493.15	7
Jonathan Ruvalcaba	Men's 10m Platform	298.45	34	did not advance			
Yahel Castillo; Julián Sánchez	Men's 3m Synchro Springboard	384.99	6 Q			437.61	Bronze medal
Ivan Garcia; German Sanchez	Men's 10m Synchro Platform	419.58	7 Q			393.09	7

Women

Athlete	Event	Preliminary		Semifinals		Final	
Athlete	Event	Points	Rank	Points	Rank	Points	Rank
Arantxa Chavez	Women's 1m Springboard	232.35	22			did not advance	
Vianey Hernandez	Women's 1m Springboard	227.85	23			did not advance	
Laura Sanchez	Women's 3m Springboard	325.50	3 Q	299.80	11 Q	329.70	6
Paola Espinosa	Women's 3m Springboard	295.50	14 Q	286.50	16	did not advance	
Paola Espinosa	Women's 10m Platform	328.35	5 Q	366.65	3 Q	377.15	Bronze medal
Alejandra Orosco	Women's 10m Platform	304.35	10 Q	284.35	16	did not advance	
Arantxa Chavez; Laura Sanchez	Women's 3m Synchro Springboard	272.10	9 Q			278.10	9
Paola Espinosa; Tatiana Ortiz	Women's 10m Synchro Platform	269.49	10 Q			298.80	8

== Open water swimming ==
Men

Athlete	Event	Final	
Athlete	Event	Time	Position
Luis Ricardo Escobar Torres	Men's 5km	56:42.9	25
Luis Ricardo Escobar Torres	Men's 10km	1:54:59.5	22
Ivan de Jesus Lopez Ramos	Men's 10km	DNF	

Women

Athlete	Event	Final	
Athlete	Event	Time	Position
Lizeth Santos	Women's 5km	1:52.10	28
Lizeth Santos	Women's 10km	2:06:52.1	33
Zaira Cardenas Hernandez	Women's 5km	1:19.3	23
Zaira Cardenas Hernandez	Women's 25km	DNF	
Alejandra Gonzalez Lara	Women's 10km	2:03:25.8	25

Mixed

Athlete	Event	Final	
Athlete	Event	Time	Position
Zaira Cardenas Hernandez; Alejandra Gonzalez Lara; Luis Ricardo Escobad Torres	Team	1:03:23.9	12

== Swimming ==
Mexico qualified 9 swimmers.

Men

Athlete	Event	Heats		Semifinals		Final	
Athlete	Event	Time	Rank	Time	Rank	Time	Rank
Daniel Delgadillo Faisal	Men's 800m Freestyle	8:10.82	30			did not advance	
David Oliver Mercado	Men's 100m Breaststroke	1:03.57	57	did not advance			
David Oliver Mercado	Men's 200m Breaststroke	2:18.72	40	did not advance			
Israel Duran	Men's 200m Butterfly	2:00.55	29	did not advance			
Ezequiel Trujillo Aviles	Men's 400m IM	4:30.85	28			did not advance	

Women

Athlete	Event	Heats		Semifinals		Final	
Athlete	Event	Time	Rank	Time	Rank	Time	Rank
Liliana Ibanez	Women's 50m Freestyle	26.04	28	did not advance			
Liliana Ibanez	Women's 100m Freestyle	56.07	33	did not advance			
Liliana Ibanez	Women's 200m Freestyle	2:01.70	34	did not advance			
Charetzeni Susana Escobar	Women's 400m Freestyle	4:13.38	20			did not advance	
Charetzeni Susana Escobar	Women's 1500m Freestyle	16:40.09	22			did not advance	
Charetzeni Susana Escobar	Women's 400m IM	4:49.95	27			did not advance	
Patricia Castaneda Miyamoto	Women's 800m Freestyle	8:42.65	20			did not advance	
Patricia Castaneda Miyamoto	Women's 1500m Freestyle	16:26.36	16			did not advance	
Maria Gonzalez Ramirez	Women's 50m Backstroke	29.45	33	did not advance			
Maria Gonzalez Ramirez	Women's 100m Backstroke	1:02.16	26	did not advance			
Maria Gonzalez Ramirez	Women's 200m Backstroke	2:12.29	19	did not advance			
Rita Medrano	Women's 100m Butterfly	1:00.55	35	did not advance			
Rita Medrano	Women's 200m Butterfly	2:10.84	23	did not advance			
Rita Medrano	Women's 200m IM	DNS		did not advance			
Charetzeni Susana Escobar; Liliana Ibanez; Patricia Castaneda; Rita Medrano	Women's 4 × 200 m Freestyle Relay	8:16.03	17			did not advance	

== Synchronised swimming ==
Mexico has qualified 10 athletes in synchronised swimming.

Women

Athlete	Event	Preliminary		Final	
Athlete	Event	Points	Rank	Points	Rank
Mariana Cifuentes; Evelyn Guajardo	Duet Technical Routine	82.900	20	did not advance	
Evelyn Guajardo; Isabel Delgado	Duet Free Routine	82.130	21	did not advance	
Claudia Aceves; Karem Achach; Mariana Cifuentes; Isabel Delgado; Evelyn Guajarado; Joana Jimenez; Ofelia Pedrero; Sofia Rios	Team Technical Routine	83.300	14	did not advance	
Claudia Aceves; Karem Achach; Mariana Cifuentes; Isabel Delgado; Evelyn Guajarado; Joana Jimenez; Ofelia Pedrero; Sofia Rios	Team Free Routine	85.110	12 Q	85.760	11

Reserve

- Karla Arreola
- Valeria Montano
