= Netherlands Antilles at the 2013 World Aquatics Championships =

- Flag of the Netherlands Antilles
- World Aquatics code: AHO
- National federation: Swimming Federation of Netherlands Antilles

in Barcelona, Spain
- Competitors: 3 in 1 sport
- Medals: Gold 0 Silver 0 Bronze 0 Total 0

World Aquatics Championships appearances
- 2003; 2005; 2007; 2009; 2011; 2013

Netherlands Antilles is competing at the 2013 World Aquatics Championships in Barcelona, Spain from 19 July to 4 August 2013.

== Swimming ==
Netherlands Antilles qualified 3 quota places for the following swimming events:

Men

Athlete	Event	Heat		Semifinal		Final	
Athlete	Event	Time	Rank	Time	Rank	Time	Rank
Noah Mascoll-Gomes	100 m freestyle	56.36	73	did not advance			
Serginni Marten	100 m breaststroke	1:08.23	65	did not advance			

Women

Athlete	Event	Heat		Semifinal		Final	
Athlete	Event	Time	Rank	Time	Rank	Time	Rank
Chade Nersicio	50 m breaststroke	37.43	66	did not advance			
Chade Nersicio	100 m breaststroke	1:21.47	56	did not advance			
