= Hong Kong at the 2011 World Aquatics Championships =

Sporting event delegation

Flag of Hong Kong

Hong Kong competed at the 2011 World Aquatics Championships in Shanghai, China between July 16 and 31, 2011.

== Diving ==
Hong Kong has qualified 4 athletes in diving.

Men

Athlete	Event	Preliminary		Semifinals		Final	
Athlete	Event	Points	Rank	Points	Rank	Points	Rank
Ho Wing Chow	Men's 1m Springboard	236.10	39			did not advance	
Wai Ching Jason Poon	Men's 1m Springboard	256.00	34			did not advance	
Wai Ching Jason Poon	Men's 3m Springboard	270.05	50	did not advance			
Ho Wing Chow; Wai Ching Jason Poon	Men's 3m Synchro Springboard	308.46	16			did not advance	

Women

Athlete	Event	Preliminary		Semifinals		Final	
Athlete	Event	Points	Rank	Points	Rank	Points	Rank
Sharon Chan	Women's 1m Springboard	245.10	17			did not advance	
Sharon Chan	Women's 3m Springboard	239.45	34	did not advance			
Sharon Chan; Ho Wing Ngai	Women's 3m Synchro Springboard	192.18	18			did not advance	

== Open water swimming ==
Men

Athlete	Event	Final	
Athlete	Event	Time	Position
Marcus Yat Ho Yuen	Men's 5km	1:02:09.2	39
Marcus Yat Ho Yuen	Men's 10km	2:12:23.9	55
Tin Yu Ling	Men's 5km	1:04:14.7	44
Tin Yu Ling	Men's 10km	2:20:13.8	62

Women

Athlete	Event	Final	
Athlete	Event	Time	Position
Fiona On Yi Chan	Women's 5km	1:04:53.2	34
Fiona On Yi Chan	Women's 10km	2:17:31.3	47
Natasha Tang	Women's 10km	2:12:00.6	43

Mixed

Athlete	Event	Final	
Athlete	Event	Time	Position
Fiona On Yi Chan; Natasha Tang; Marcus Yat Ho Yuen	Team	1:04:53.4	13

== Swimming ==
Hong Kong qualified 4 swimmers.

Men

Athlete	Event	Heats		Semifinals		Final	
Athlete	Event	Time	Rank	Time	Rank	Time	Rank
Wong Kai Wai David	Men's 200m Freestyle	1:49.58	31	did not advance			

Women

Athlete	Event	Heats		Semifinals		Final	
Athlete	Event	Time	Rank	Time	Rank	Time	Rank
Hannah Wilson	Women's 50m Freestyle	25.82	24	did not advance			
Hannah Wilson	Women's 100m Freestyle	55.71	27	did not advance			
Hannah Wilson	Women's 50m Butterfly	27.38	26	did not advance			
Hannah Wilson	Women's 100m Butterfly	59.78	26	did not advance			
Sze Hang Yu	Women's 200m Freestyle	2:00.52	28	did not advance			
Lau Yin Yan	Women's 50m Backstroke	29.79	40	did not advance			
Lau Yin Yan	Women's 100m Backstroke	1:02.45	27	did not advance			
Lau Yin Yan	Women's 200m Backstroke	2:15.09	29	did not advance			

== Synchronised swimming ==
Hong Kong has qualified 11 athletes in synchronized swimming.

Women

Athlete	Event	Preliminary		Final	
Athlete	Event	Points	Rank	Points	Rank
Man Yee Nora Cho; Yuet Lai Kan; Kam Wing Kwok; Ho Yan Pang; Tsz Ching Pang; Eros Pong; Ho Yin Kristi Wong; Cheuk Wing Cherrie Yung	Team Free Routine	63.510	23	did not advance	
Ka Wing Cheung; Man Yee Nora Cho; Yuet Lai Kan; Kam Wing Kwok; Ho Yan Pang; Tsz Ching Pang; Eros Pong; Ho Yin Kristi Wong; Hiu Fung Yu; Cheuk Wing Cherrie Yung	Free Routine Combination	65.540	15	did not advance	

Reserve

- Him Nga Lam
