= Chile at the 2011 World Aquatics Championships =

Sporting event delegation

Flag of Chile

Chile competed at the 2011 World Aquatics Championships in Shanghai, China between July 16 and 31, 2011.

== Diving ==
Chile has qualified 2 athletes in diving.

Men

Athlete	Event	Preliminary		Semifinals		Final	
Athlete	Event	Points	Rank	Points	Rank	Points	Rank
Donato Neglia	Men's 1m Springboard	238.55	37			did not advance	
Diego Carquin	Men's 1m Springboard	250.85	36			did not advance	
Diego Carquin	Men's 3m Springboard	312.90	45	did not advance			
Diego Carquin; Donato Neglia	Men's 3m Synchro Springboard	276.90	19			did not advance	

== Open water swimming ==
Men

Athlete	Event	Final	
Athlete	Event	Time	Position
Alvaro Trewhela	Men's 5km	1:00:17.1	34
Alvaro Trewhela	Men's 10km	2:03:20.4	46

== Swimming ==
Chile qualified 3 swimmers.

Men

Athlete	Event	Heats		Semifinals		Final	
Athlete	Event	Time	Rank	Time	Rank	Time	Rank
Oliver Elliot	Men's 50m Freestyle	24.01	47	did not advance			
Oliver Elliot	Men's 50m Backstroke	26.72	27	did not advance			
Diego Santander	Men's 50m Breaststroke	29.85	37	did not advance			
Diego Santander	Men's 100m Breaststroke	1:05.72	65	did not advance			

Women

Athlete	Event	Heats		Semifinals		Final	
Athlete	Event	Time	Rank	Time	Rank	Time	Rank
Kristel Kobrich	Women's 800m Freestyle	8:28.76	9			did not advance	
Kristel Kobrich	Women's 1500m Freestyle	16:03.50	4 Q			16:05.11	4
