= Singapore at the 2011 World Aquatics Championships =

Sporting event delegation

Flag of Singapore

Singapore competed at the 2011 World Aquatics Championships in Shanghai, China between July 16 and 31, 2011.

== Swimming ==
Singapore qualified 5 swimmers.

Men

Athlete	Event	Heats		Semifinals		Final	
Athlete	Event	Time	Rank	Time	Rank	Time	Rank
Danny Yeo	Men's 200m Freestyle	1:52.54	42	did not advance			
Zhen Ren Teo	Men's 800m Freestyle	8:28.67	48			did not advance	

Women

Athlete	Event	Heats		Semifinals		Final	
Athlete	Event	Time	Rank	Time	Rank	Time	Rank
Amanda Lim	Women's 50m Freestyle	26.12	30	did not advance			
Amanda Lim	Women's 100m Freestyle	57.00	39	did not advance			
Shana Lim	Women's 100m Backstroke	1:07.23	49	did not advance			
Tao Li	Women's 50m Backstroke	29.40	32	did not advance			
Tao Li	Women's 50m Butterfly	26.43	11 Q	26.34	9	did not advance	
Tao Li	Women's 100m Butterfly	58.89	15 Q	58.78	15	did not advance	

== Synchronised swimming ==
Singapore has qualified 10 athletes in synchronised swimming.

Women

Athlete	Event	Preliminary		Final	
Athlete	Event	Points	Rank	Points	Rank
Stephanie Chen; Hui Yu Yap	Duet Technical Routine	67.200	39	did not advance	
Stephanie Chen; Hui Yu Yap	Duet Free Routine	68.790	38	did not advance	
Samantha Chen; Stephanie Chen; Geraldine Chew; Aik Ping Tay; Mei Shan Krishnan; Mei Shuang Lee; Priscilla Sung; Elisabeth Tan	Team Technical Routine	DNS		did not advance	
Samantha Chen; Hui Zhang; Geraldine Chew; Aik Ping Tay; Mei Shan Krishnan; Mei Shuang Lee; Priscilla Sung; Elisabeth Tan	Team Free Routine	64.780	22	did not advance	
Samantha Chen; Stephanie Chen; Geraldine Chew; Hui Yu Yap; Aik Ping Tay; Mei Chan Krishnan; Mei Shuang Lee; Priscilla Sung; Elisabeth Tan; Hui Zhang	Free Routine Combination	70.400	12 Q	70.240	12
