= Diving at the 2011 World Aquatics Championships – Men's synchronized 3 metre springboard =

The men's synchronized 3 metre springboard competition of the diving events at the 2011 World Aquatics Championships was held on July 19 with the preliminary round held in the morning and the final in the evening session.

== Medalists ==
Gold	Silver	Bronze
Qin Kai; Luo Yutong; China	Ilya Zakharov; Evgeny Kuznetsov; Russia	Julián Sánchez; Yahel Castillo; Mexico

== Results ==
The preliminary round was held at 10:00. The final was held at 17:05.

Green denotes finalists

Rank	Diver	Nationality	Preliminary		Final	
Rank	Diver	Nationality	Points	Rank	Points	Rank
1st place, gold medalist(s)	Qin Kai; Luo Yutong	China	452.19	1	463.98	1
2nd place, silver medalist(s)	Ilya Zakharov; Evgeny Kuznetsov	Russia	438.75	2	451.89	2
3rd place, bronze medalist(s)	Julián Sánchez; Yahel Castillo	Mexico	384.99	6	437.61	3
4	Kristian Ipsen; Troy Dumais	United States	410.64	4	429.06	4
5	Patrick Hausding; Stephan Feck	Germany	413.91	3	414.39	5
6	Oleksiy Pryhorov; Oleksandr Gorshkovozov	Ukraine	380.52	7	412.20	6
7	Chris Mears; Nick Robinson-Baker	Great Britain	375.66	8	403.68	7
8	Matthieu Rosset; Damien Cely	France	399.30	5	402.36	8
9	Sho Sakai; Yu Okamoto	Japan	371.55	10	395.19	9
10	Michele Benedetti; Tommaso Rinaldi	Italy	372.36	9	381.63	10
11	Eirik Valheim; Espen Valheim	Norway	355.17	11	379.74	11
12	Chola Chanturia; Shota Korakhashvili	Georgia	354.93	12	365.13	12
13	Yorick de Bruijn; Ramon de Meijer	Netherlands	350.10	13		
14	Deyne Castellanos; Jorge Luis Pupo	Cuba	345.63	14		
15	Alexandros Manos; Stefanos Paparounas	Greece	342.30	15		
16	Chow Ho Wing; Poon Wai Ching Jason	Hong Kong	308.46	16		
17	Ignas Barkauskas; Sergej Baziuk	Lithuania	301.77	17		
18	Luthfi Niko Abdillah; Andriyan Andriyan	Indonesia	286.98	18		
19	Diego Carquin; Donato Neglia	Chile	276.90	19		
20	Dmitriy Sorokin; Farid Gurbanov	Azerbaijan	220.71	20		
