= Netherlands Antilles at the 2011 World Aquatics Championships =

- Flag of the Netherlands Antilles
- FINA code: AHO
- National federation: Swimming Federation of Netherlands Antilles

in Shanghai, China
- Competitors: 1 in 1 sport
- Medals: Gold 0 Silver 0 Bronze 0 Total 0

World Aquatics Championships appearances
- 2003; 2005; 2007; 2009; 2011; 2013

Netherlands Antilles competed at the 2011 World Aquatics Championships in Shanghai, China between July 16 and 31, 2011.

== Swimming ==
Netherlands Antilles qualified 1 swimmer.

Men

Athlete	Event	Heats		Semifinals		Final	
Athlete	Event	Time	Rank	Time	Rank	Time	Rank
Rodion Davelaar	Men's 50m Breaststroke	28.21	24	did not advance			
Rodion Davelaar	Men's 100m Breaststroke	1:04.50	61	did not advance			
