= He Min =

Chinese diver

Personal information
- Nationality: China
- Born: August 16, 1992 (age 33) Hengyang, Hunan
- Height: 1.65 m (5 ft 5 in)

Sport
- Event: 1 m
Medal record
Event	1st	2nd	3rd
World Championships	-	1	-
Asian Games	1	-	-
Men's Diving
Representing China
World Championships
Silver medal – second place	2011 Shanghai	1 m springboard
Asian Games
Gold medal – first place	2010 Guangzhou	1 m springboard

He Min (Chinese: 何敏, born August 16, 1992) is a Chinese diver who specialises in the 1 metre springboard event. Min won a gold medal in the 1 metre springboard event at the 2010 Asian Games, and a silver of the same event in the 2011 World Aquatics Championships.
