= Stavroula Antonakou =

Greek water polo player

Personal information
- Nationality: Greek
- Born: 2 May 1982 (age 44) Piraeus, Greece
- Height: 5 ft 7 in (170 cm)

Sport
- Sport: Water polo
Medal record
Women's water polo
Representing Greece
World Championship
Gold medal – first place	2011 Shanghai	Team competition
European Championship
Silver medal – second place	2010 Zagreb	Team competition
Silver medal – second place	2012 Eindhoven	Team competition
FINA World League
Bronze medal – third place	2010 San Diego	Team competition
Bronze medal – third place	2012 Changshu	Team competition

Stavroula Antonakou (born 2 May 1982) is a retired Greek water polo player, playing as a driver, World Champion (in 2011 in Shanghai) with the Greek women's national water polo team. She was a part of the team at the European Championships, including at the 2008, 2010 and 2012 Women's European Water Polo Championship.

At club level, she played for Olympiacos and Ethnikos, becoming captain in both teams.

== Political career ==
As a member of The River political party, Antonakou was elected Member of the Hellenic Parliament for Piraeus A in the January 2015 elections.

== See also ==
- List of world champions in women's water polo
- List of World Aquatics Championships medalists in water polo
