= Julián Sánchez (diver) =

Mexican diver

Personal information
- Full name: Julián Isaac Sánchez Gallegos
- Born: 22 August 1988 (age 37) Mexico City, Mexico
- Height: 160 cm (5 ft 3 in)

Sport
- Country: Mexico
- Partner: Yahel Castillo
Medal record
Men's diving
Representing Mexico
World Championships
Bronze medal – third place	2011 Shanghai	3 m Springboard Synchro
Summer Universiade
Silver medal – second place	2011 Shenzhen	3 m springboard
Pan American Games
Gold medal – first place	2011 Guadalajara	Sync. springboard
Silver medal – second place	2011 Guadalajara	3 m springboard

Julián Isaac Sánchez Gallegos (born 22 August 1988 in Mexico City) is a Mexican diver. He won one gold and one silver medal in the 2011 Pan-American Games. He competed at the 2012 Summer Olympics in the men's synchronised springboard diving, with Yahel Castillo, finishing in 7th place.
