= Swimming at the 2011 World Aquatics Championships – Men's 100 metre breaststroke =

Men's 100 metre breaststroke at the 2011 World Aquatics Championships
- Dates: July 24, 2011 (heats and semifinals); July 25, 2011 (final)
- Competitors: 83 from 66 nations
- Winning time: 58.71

Medalists
gold medal	Alexander Dale Oen	Norway
silver medal	Fabio Scozzoli	Italy
bronze medal	Cameron van der Burgh	South Africa

The men's 100 metre breaststroke competition of the swimming events at the 2011 World Aquatics Championships took place July 24 and 25. The heats and semifinals took place July 24 and the final was held July 25.

== Records ==
Prior to the competition, the existing world and championship records were as follows.

	Name	Nation	Time	Location	Date
World record Championship record	Brenton Rickard	Australia	58.58	Rome	July 27, 2009

== Results ==
=== Heats ===
83 swimmers participated in 11 heats, qualified swimmers are listed:

Rank	Heat	Lane	Name	Nationality	Time	Notes
1	10	4	Alexander Dale Oen	Norway	59.71	Q
2	9	2	Glenn Snyders	New Zealand	59.94	Q, NR
3	11	4	Kosuke Kitajima	Japan	59.96	Q
4	10	3	Felipe França Silva	Brazil	1:00.01	Q
5	9	6	Fabio Scozzoli	Italy	1:00.14	Q
6	9	3	Mark Gangloff	United States	1:00.29	Q
7	11	3	Christian Sprenger	Australia	1:00.35	Q
8	9	4	Ryo Tateishi	Japan	1:00.37	Q
9	9	5	Hugues Duboscq	France	1:00.38	Q
10	11	5	Cameron van der Burgh	South Africa	1:00.39	Q
11	11	7	Dániel Gyurta	Hungary	1:00.40	Q
12	10	8	Giedrius Titenis	Lithuania	1:00.41	Q
13	10	5	Brenton Rickard	Australia	1:00.48	Q
14	11	1	Hendrik Feldwehr	Germany	1:00.70	Q
15	10	7	Michael Jamieson	Great Britain	1:00.79	Q
16	10	1	Lennart Stekelenburg	Netherlands	1:00.86	Q
17	9	7	Roman Sludnov	Russia	1:00.91	
18	11	8	Andrew Dickens	Canada	1:01.18	
19	8	8	Dragos Arache	Romania	1:01.19	
20	8	4	Igor Borysik	Ukraine	1:01.25	
20	8	2	Mattia Pesce	Italy	1:01.25	
22	10	2	Christian vom Lehn	Germany	1:01.26	
23	8	6	Xie Zhi	China	1:01.30	
24	11	2	Felipe Lima	Brazil	1:01.37	
25	11	6	Mihail Alexandrov	United States	1:01.41	
26	8	5	Kristopher Gilchrist	Great Britain	1:01.46	
27	7	1	Jakob Sveinsson	Iceland	1:01.51	
28	8	1	Valerii Dymo	Ukraine	1:01.52	
29	7	6	Matjaž Markič	Slovenia	1:01.56	
30	7	5	Laurent Carnol	Luxembourg	1:01.57	
31	6	5	Čaba Silađi	Serbia	1:01.59	
32	9	8	Anton Lobanov	Russia	1:01.64	
33	7	3	Damir Dugonjič	Slovenia	1:01.69	
34	10	6	Neil Versfeld	South Africa	1:01.72	
35	5	8	Petr Bartunek	Czech Republic	1:01.75	
36	7	4	Chen Cheng	China	1:01.81	
37	6	3	Choi Kyu-Woong	South Korea	1:01.83	
38	8	3	Vladislav Polyakov	Kazakhstan	1:01.85	
39	7	7	Hunor Mate	Austria	1:01.88	
40	6	6	Édgar Crespo	Panama	1:01.94	
41	7	2	Ákos Molnár	Hungary	1:02.11	
42	5	4	Carlos Almeida	Portugal	1:02.13	NR
43	8	7	Dawid Szulich	Poland	1:02.24	
44	5	1	Miguel Ferreira	Venezuela	1:02.29	NR
45	4	3	Gal Nevo	Israel	1:02.32	
46	6	7	Lovro Bilonić	Croatia	1:02.44	
47	9	1	Barry Murphy	Ireland	1:02.50	
48	5	5	Malick Fall	Senegal	1:02.55	
49	5	6	Sandeep Sejwal	India	1:02.62	
50	5	7	Tomáš Klobučník	Slovakia	1:02.69	
51	6	1	Ömer Aslanoğlu	Turkey	1:02.71	
51	6	8	Jakob Dorch	Sweden	1:02.71	
53	4	4	Jorge Murillo	Colombia	1:02.73	
54	6	2	Martti Aljand	Estonia	1:02.78	
55	7	8	Panagiotis Samilidis	Greece	1:02.80	
56	5	2	Genaro Britez	Paraguay	1:03.44	
57	5	3	David Oliver Mercado	Mexico	1:03.57	
58	6	4	Indra Gunawan	Indonesia	1:03.80	
59	4	6	Amini Fonua	Tonga	1:04.02	
60	4	7	Azad Al-Barazi	Syria	1:04.23	
61	4	2	Nabil Kebbab	Algeria	1:04.50	
61	4	1	Rodion Davelaar	Netherlands Antilles	1:04.50	
63	3	5	Timothy Ferris	Zimbabwe	1:04.76	NR
64	4	8	Julian Fletcher	Bermuda	1:05.00	
65	3	4	Diego Santander	Chile	1:05.72	
66	3	3	Juan Guerra	El Salvador	1:05.88	
67	3	1	Diguan Pigot	Suriname	1:06.00	
68	3	8	Andrea Agius	Malta	1:06.13	NR
69	3	6	Mubarak Al-Besher	United Arab Emirates	1:06.70	
70	2	4	Jordy Groters	Aruba	1:06.88	
71	3	7	Oluseyi Fatayi-Williams	Nigeria	1:07.57	
72	2	5	Benjamin Schulte	Guam	1:07.62	
73	2	6	Wael Koubrousli	Lebanon	1:09.11	
74	2	3	Tarco Liobet	Bolivia	1:09.80	
75	3	2	Shajahan Ali	Bangladesh	1:10.22	
76	2	1	Mamitina Ramanantsoa	Madagascar	1:11.96	
77	2	2	Indra Rakotondrazanaka	Madagascar	1:13.38	
78	2	8	Mamadou Fofana	Mali	1:16.86	
79	1	4	Fdingue Ekane	Cameroon	1:19.30	
80	2	7	Ruslan Oliftaev	Tajikistan	1:25.82	
81	1	3	Thierry Videgni	Benin	1:34.34	
	4	5	Mohammad Alirezaei	Iran	DNS	
	1	5	Mohamed Camara	Guinea	DSQ	

- ^1 Mohammad Alirezaei pulled out of his heat because Israeli Gal Nevo was also scheduled to swim in the heat. Iran does not recognize Israel as a country.

=== Semifinals ===
The semifinals were held 19:06.

==== Semifinal 1 ====
Rank	Lane	Name	Nationality	Time	Notes
1	2	Cameron van der Burgh	South Africa	1:00.07	Q
2	3	Mark Gangloff	United States	1:00.19	Q
3	7	Giedrius Titenis	Lithuania	1:00.26	Q
4	6	Ryo Tateishi	Japan	1:00.36	
5	8	Lennart Stekelenburg	Netherlands	1:00.50	
6	4	Glenn Snyders	New Zealand	1:00.59	
7	5	Felipe França Silva	Brazil	1:00.73	
8	1	Hendrik Feldwehr	Germany	1:00.91	

==== Semifinal 2 ====
Rank	Lane	Name	Nationality	Time	Notes
1	4	Alexander Dale Oen	Norway	59.37	Q
2	5	Kosuke Kitajima	Japan	59.77	Q
3	3	Fabio Scozzoli	Italy	59.83	Q, NR
4	1	Brenton Rickard	Australia	1:00.04	Q
5	7	Dániel Gyurta	Hungary	1:00.23	Q, NR
6	6	Christian Sprenger	Australia	1:00.44	
7	2	Hugues Duboscq	France	1:00.56	
8	8	Michael Jamieson	Great Britain	1:00.93	

=== Final ===
The final was held 19:27.

Rank	Lane	Name	Nationality	Time	Notes
1st place, gold medalist(s)	4	Alexander Dale Oen	Norway	58.71	NR
2nd place, silver medalist(s)	3	Fabio Scozzoli	Italy	59.42	NR
3rd place, bronze medalist(s)	2	Cameron van der Burgh	South Africa	59.49	
4	5	Kosuke Kitajima	Japan	1:00.03	
5	6	Brenton Rickard	Australia	1:00.11	
6	1	Dániel Gyurta	Hungary	1:00.25	
6	8	Giedrius Titenis	Lithuania	1:00.25	
8	7	Mark Gangloff	United States	1:00.52	
