= Swimming at the 2011 World Aquatics Championships – Women's 100 metre butterfly =

Women's 100 metre butterfly at the 2011 World Aquatics Championships
- Dates: 24 July 2011 (heats and semifinals); 25 July 2011 (final)
- Competitors: 47 from 40 nations
- Winning time: 56.87

Medalists
gold medal	Dana Vollmer	United States
silver medal	Alicia Coutts	Australia
bronze medal	Lu Ying	China

The women's 100 metre butterfly competition of the swimming events at the 2011 World Aquatics Championships took place on 24 and 25 July. The heats and semifinals took place on 24 July and the final was held on 25 July.

== Records ==
Prior to the competition, the existing world and championship records were as follows.

	Name	Nation	Time	Location	Date
World record Championship record	Sarah Sjöström	Sweden	56.06	Rome	27 July 2009

== Results ==
=== Heats ===
47 swimmers participated in 6 heats, qualified swimmers are listed:

Rank	Heat	Lane	Name	Nationality	Time	Notes
1	5	5	Dana Vollmer	United States	56.97	Q
2	6	4	Alicia Coutts	Australia	57.49	Q
3	4	5	Jemma Lowe	Great Britain	57.81	Q
4	4	2	Jessicah Schipper	Australia	57.86	Q
5	6	2	Lu Ying	China	57.93	Q
6	4	4	Sarah Sjöström	Sweden	58.10	Q
7	4	3	Ellen Gandy	Great Britain	58.32	Q
7	5	6	Jeanette Ottesen	Denmark	58.32	Q
9	6	5	Liu Zige	China	58.44	Q
10	5	4	Christine Magnuson	United States	58.49	Q
11	5	3	Inge Dekker	Netherlands	58.53	Q
12	4	6	Katerine Savard	Canada	58.59	Q
13	6	6	Yuka Kato	Japan	58.70	Q
14	6	3	Therese Alshammar	Sweden	58.71	Q
15	5	2	Tao Li	Singapore	58.89	Q
15	6	8	Irina Bespalova	Russia	58.89	Q
17	4	7	Vanessa Mohr	South Africa	58.96	
17	4	8	Sina Sutter	Germany	58.96	
19	2	3	Otylia Jędrzejczak	Poland	59.00	
20	5	8	Audrey Lacroix	Canada	59.02	
21	5	1	Daynara de Paula	Brazil	59.24	
22	6	7	Kristel Vourna	Greece	59.27	
23	3	6	Judit Ignacio Sorribes	Spain	59.52	
24	5	7	Amit Ivry	Israel	59.56	
25	3	4	Natsumi Hoshi	Japan	59.63	
26	3	2	Hannah Wilson	Hong Kong	59.78	
26	3	8	Triin Aljand	Estonia	59.78	
28	2	5	Ingvild Snildal	Norway	59.80	
29	2	4	Birgit Koschischek	Austria	59.84	
30	2	6	Katarina Listopadova	Slovakia	59.87	
31	3	1	Kimberly Buys	Belgium	59.88	
32	6	1	Sara Oliveira	Portugal	59.93	
33	3	5	Sara Isaković	Slovenia	1:00.23	
34	3	3	Ilaria Bianchi	Italy	1:00.36	
35	2	2	Rita Medrano	Mexico	1:00.55	
36	4	1	Eszter Dara	Hungary	1:00.69	
37	2	7	Se-Hyeon An	South Korea	1:00.76	
38	2	1	Iris Rosenberger	Turkey	1:00.99	
39	3	7	Sophia Batchelor	New Zealand	1:01.92	
40	1	4	Jasmine Alkhaldi	Philippines	1:03.69	
41	1	3	Loreen Whitfield	American Samoa	1:04.82	
42	1	5	Marie Laura Meza	Costa Rica	1:05.05	
43	1	6	Noel Borshi	Albania	1:05.71	
43	1	7	Dalia Torrez	Nicaragua	1:05.71	
45	1	1	Simona Muccioli	San Marino	1:06.45	
46	1	2	Dorian McMenemy	Dominican Republic	1:06.58	
47	1	8	Debra Daniel	Micronesia	1:14.51	

==== Reserve place swimoff ====
As two swimmers had the same time in the heats at place 17 they had to participate in a swimoff to determine the first semifinal reserve swimmer.

Rank	Lane	Name	Nationality	Time	Notes
1	4	Vanessa Mohr	South Africa	58.66	
2	5	Sina Sutter	Germany	59.47	

=== Semifinals ===
The semifinals were held on 24 July at 18:00.

==== Semifinal 1 ====
Rank	Lane	Name	Nationality	Time	Notes
1	3	Sarah Sjöström	Sweden	57.29	Q
2	4	Alicia Coutts	Australia	57.41	Q
3	5	Jessicah Schipper	Australia	57.95	Q
4	7	Katerine Savard	Canada	58.07	
5	1	Therese Alshammar	Sweden	58.20	
6	6	Jeanette Ottesen	Denmark	58.24	
7	2	Christine Magnuson	United States	58.59	
8	8	Irina Bespalova	Russia	59.02	

==== Semifinal 2 ====
Rank	Lane	Name	Nationality	Time	Notes
1	4	Dana Vollmer	United States	56.47	Q, AM
2	3	Lu Ying	China	57.18	Q
3	5	Jemma Lowe	Great Britain	57.57	Q
4	2	Liu Zige	China	57.85	Q
5	6	Ellen Gandy	Great Britain	57.97	Q
6	7	Inge Dekker	Netherlands	58.70	
7	1	Yuka Kato	Japan	58.71	
8	8	Tao Li	Singapore	58.78	

=== Final ===
The final was held at 18:02.

Rank	Lane	Name	Nationality	Time	Notes
1st place, gold medalist(s)	4	Dana Vollmer	United States	56.87	
2nd place, silver medalist(s)	6	Alicia Coutts	Australia	56.94	
3rd place, bronze medalist(s)	5	Lu Ying	China	57.06	
4	3	Sarah Sjöström	Sweden	57.38	
5	8	Ellen Gandy	Great Britain	57.55	
6	7	Liu Zige	China	57.57	
7	1	Jessicah Schipper	Australia	57.95	
8	2	Jemma Lowe	Great Britain	57.96	
