= Jenifer Benítez =

Spanish diver (born 1988)

Personal information
- Born: 18 October 1988 (age 36); Las Palmas, Spain

Sport
- Sport: Diving

Jenifer Benítez Benítez (born 18 October 1988 in Las Palmas) is a Spanish diver. She competed in the 3 m springboard at the 2008 Summer Olympics and the 3 m springboard at the 2012 Summer Olympics.

Her debut in the international level came at the 2006 European Junior Swimming Championships. Two years later, she qualified for the 2008 European Swimming Championships and represented Spain at the 2008 Summer Olympics in Beijing, on the 3-meter diving board, where she finished last in the preliminary round. In the 2011 World Swimming Championships, she reached her best position at 25th place.

At the 2012 Summer Olympics in London, she repeated the same position in the preliminary round of the women's 3-metre diving board, with a performance that was hampered by a previous injury. The following year, she participated in both the 2013 Summer Universiade and the 2013 World Swimming Championships. In total, she has been named best jumper in Spain four times.

She is currently a member of the Salinas Swimming Club in Las Palmas de Gran Canaria and has a degree in medicine.
