= Amund Gismervik =

Norwegian Olympic diver

Personal information
- Nationality: Norwegian
- Born: 24 January 1991 (age 34); Stavanger

Sport
- Sport: Diving

Amund Nordal Gismervik (born 24 January 1991) is a Norwegian diver. He was born in Stavanger. He competed in 10 metre platform at the 2012 Summer Olympics in London.
