= Blanca Gil Sorli =

Spanish water polo player (born 1983)

Blanca Gil
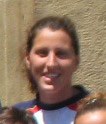

Personal information
- Full name: Blanca Gil Sorli
- Nationality: Spanish
- Born: 19 September 1983 (age 43)
- Height: 1.79 m (5 ft 10 in)
- Weight: 69 kg (152 lb)

Sport
- Sport: Water polo
- Handedness: left
National team
- Years: Team
- ?: Spain

Blanca Gil Sorli (born 19 September 1983) is a Spanish former water polo player. She was part of the Spain women's national water polo team. She competed at the 2011 World Aquatics Championships.

== Clubs ==
- Club Natació Ciutat (Spain)
- CN Sabadell (Spain)
- ASD Roma (Italy)
- Orizzonte Catania (Italy)
- Olympiacos (Greece)
- Blu Team Catania (Italy)
- Orizzonte Catania (Italy)
- Club Esportu Mediterrani (Spain)
