= Kseniya Moskvina =

Russian swimmer

Personal information
- Full name: Kseniya Leonidovna Moskvina
- National team: Russia
- Born: 29 May 1989 (age 37) Chelyabinsk, Russian SFSR, Soviet Union
- Height: 1.80 m (5 ft 11 in)
- Weight: 62 kg (137 lb)

Sport
- Sport: Swimming
- Strokes: Backstroke
Medal record
Women's swimming
Representing Russia
Summer Universiade
Bronze medal – third place	2009 Belgrade	4×100 m medley
European Championships (SC)
Gold medal – first place	2009 Istanbul	100 m backstroke
Bronze medal – third place	2009 Istanbul	50 m backstroke
Bronze medal – third place	2009 Istanbul	4×100 m medley

Kseniya Leonidovna Moskvina (Russian: Ксения Леонидовна Москвина; born May 29, 1989) is a Russian swimmer, who specialized in backstroke events. She finished fourteenth in the 100 m backstroke at the 2008 Summer Olympics, and eclipsed a European record (56.36) to claim the gold medal at the 2009 European Short Course Championships in Istanbul, Turkey, apart from two of her bronze medals obtained in the 50 m backstroke, and 4 × 100 m medley relay.

Moskvina competed for the Russian team in two swimming events at the 2008 Summer Olympics in Beijing. Leading up to the Games, she finished with the second-place time in 1:00.95 to assure her direct selection to the Olympic team and clear the FINA A-cut (1:01.70) by almost a full second at the Russian Open Championships in Moscow. In the 100 m backstroke, Moskvina missed the top eight final with a thirteenth-place time in 1:01.06. Swimming in heat six on the evening prelims, Moskvina put up a tremendous effort from lane one with a blazing 1:00.70 to seal the last seed of the top 16 semifinal roster.

On the last day of the competition, Moskvina earned a fifth-place finish as a member of the Russian team in the 4 × 100 m medley relay with a final time of 3:57.84. Swimming the lead-off backstroke leg in the prelims, Moskvina produced a split of 1:01.05 to receive the Russian foursome of Anastasia Aksenova, Yuliya Yefimova, and Natalya Sutyagina a fifth seed en route to the final in 3:59.66.

On March 14, 2013, Moskvina was ordered a six-year ban by the Russian Swimming Federation for committing a second doping violation.
