= France at the 2011 World Aquatics Championships =

- Flag of France
- World Aquatics code: FRA
- National federation: Fédération Française de Natation
- Website: www.ffnatation.fr

in Shanghai, China
- Medals Ranked 8th: Gold 2 Silver 4 Bronze 5 Total 11

World Aquatics Championships appearances
- 1973; 1975; 1978; 1982; 1986; 1991; 1994; 1998; 2001; 2003; 2005; 2007; 2009; 2011; 2013; 2015; 2017; 2019; 2022; 2023; 2024; 2025

France competed at the 2011 World Aquatics Championships in Shanghai, China between July 16 and 31, 2011.

== Medalists ==
Medal	Name	Sport	Event	Date
Gold	Camille Lacourt	Swimming	Men's 100 metre backstroke	26 July
Gold	Jérémy Stravius	Swimming	Men's 100 metre backstroke	26 July
Silver	Aurélie Muller	Open Water Swimming	Women's 5km	22 July
Silver	Alain Bernard; Jérémy Stravius; William Meynard; Fabien Gilot	Swimming	Men's 4 × 100 m Freestyle Relay	24 July
Silver	Yannick Agnel; Grégory Mallet; Jérémy Stravius; Fabien Gilot; Sébastien Rouault	Swimming	Men's 4 × 200 m Freestyle Relay	29 July
Silver	Camille Lacourt	Swimming	Men's 50m Backstroke	31 July
Bronze	Camille Muffat	Swimming	Women's 400m Freestyle	24 July
Bronze	Camille Muffat	Swimming	Women's 200m Freestyle	27 July
Bronze	William Meynard	Swimming	Men's 100m Freestyle	28 July
Bronze	Alain Bernard	Swimming	Men's 50m Freestyle	30 July
Bronze	Mélanie Henique	Swimming	Women's 50m Butterfly	30 July

== Diving ==
France has qualified 5 athletes in diving.

Men

Athlete	Event	Preliminary		Semifinals		Final	
Athlete	Event	Points	Rank	Points	Rank	Points	Rank
Damien Cely	Men's 1m Springboard	352.40	15			did not advance	
Damien Cely	Men's 3m Springboard	354.70	38	did not advance			
Matthieu Rosset	Men's 1m Springboard	337.95	21			did not advance	
Matthieu Rosset	Men's 3m Springboard	433.00	10 Q	445.25	8 Q	455.45	7
Matthieu Rosset; Damien Cely	Men's 3m Synchro Springboard	399.30	5 Q			402.36	8

Women

Athlete	Event	Preliminary		Semifinals		Final	
Athlete	Event	Points	Rank	Points	Rank	Points	Rank
Fanny Bouvet	Women's 1m Springboard	227.10	24			did not advance	
Fanny Bouvet	Women's 3m Springboard	246.40	30	did not advance			
Marion Farissier	Women's 1m Springboard	221.65	27			did not advance	
Marion Farissier	Women's 3m Springboard	270.90	21	did not advance			
Audrey Labeau	Women's 10m Platform	98.50	33	did not advance			
Fanny Bouvet; Marion Farissier	Women's 3m Synchro Springboard	255.84	10 Q			254.10	11

== Open water swimming ==
Men

Athlete	Event	Final	
Athlete	Event	Time	Position
Damien Cattin Vidal	Men's 5km	56:27.4	7
Sebastien Fraysse	Men's 5km	56:45.6	26
Sebastien Fraysse	Men's 10km	1:54:50.2	16
Julien Sauvage	Men's 10km	1:54:37.2	8
Bertrand Venturi	Men's 25km	5:13:26.9	11
Joanes Hedel	Men's 25km	5:13:03.1	8

Women

Athlete	Event	Final	
Athlete	Event	Time	Position
Aurélie Muller	Women's 5km	1:00:40.1	Silver medal
Ophélie Aspord	Women's 5km	1:00:44.9	6
Ophélie Aspord	Women's 10km	2:02:28.3	16
Celia Barrot	Women's 10km	2:03:43.7	26
Celia Barrot	Women's 25km	5:29:40.8	7

Mixed

Athlete	Event	Final	
Athlete	Event	Time	Position
Ophélie Aspord; Damien Cattin Vidal; Sebastien Fraysse	Team	1:00:27.3	7

== Swimming ==
France qualified 21 swimmers.

Men

Athlete	Event	Heats		Semifinals		Final	
Athlete	Event	Time	Rank	Time	Rank	Time	Rank
Alain Bernard	Men's 50m Freestyle	22.19	10 Q	22.07	8 Q	21.92	Bronze medal
Frederick Bousquet	Men's 50m Freestyle	22.38	21	did not advance			
Frederick Bousquet	Men's 50m Butterfly	23.84	14 Q	23.42	8 Q	23.38	4
William Meynard	Men's 100m Freestyle	48.14	1 Q	48.25	3 Q	48.00	Bronze medal
Fabien Gilot	Men's 100m Freestyle	48.48	5 Q	48.46	8 Q	48.13	5
Yannick Agnel	Men's 200m Freestyle	1:47.11	6 Q	1:45.62	1 Q	1:44:99	5
Yannick Agnel	Men's 400m Freestyle	3:46.72	6 Q			3:45.24	6
Sebastien Rouault	Men's 400m Freestyle	3:46.20	5 Q			3:47.66	8
Sebastien Rouault	Men's 800m Freestyle	7:49.43	7 Q			7:55.91	8
Sebastien Rouault	Men's 1500m Freestyle	15:05.88	11			did not advance	
Camille Lacourt	Men's 50m Backstroke	25.03	2 Q	24.85	2 Q	24.57	Silver medal
Camille Lacourt	Men's 100m Backstroke	53.30	1 Q	53.09	3 Q	52.76	Gold medal
Jérémy Stravius	Men's 100m Backstroke	53.34	2 Q	52.76	1 Q	52.76	Gold medal
Benjamin Stasiulis	Men's 200m Backstroke	1:58.42	15 Q	1:58.19	11	did not advance	
Hugues Duboscq	Men's 100m Breaststroke	1:00.38	9 Q	1:00.56	12	did not advance	
Hugues Duboscq	Men's 200m Breaststroke	2:13.56	23	did not advance			
Florent Manaudou	Men's 50m Butterfly	23.31	3 Q	23.32	3 Q	23.49	5
Alain Bernard; Jérémy Stravius; William Meynard; Fabien Gilot	Men's 4 × 100 m Freestyle Relay	3:12.09	1 Q			3:11.14	Silver medal
Yannick Agnel; Gregory Mallet; Jérémy Stravius; Fabien Gilot; Sebastien Rouault*	Men's 4 × 200 m Freestyle Relay	7:11.60	3 Q			7:04.81	Silver medal
Jérémy Stravius; Hugues Duboscq; Florent Manaudou; Fabien Gilot	Men's 4 × 100 m Medley Relay	3:36.21	9			did not advance	

- * raced in heats only

Women

Athlete	Event	Heats		Semifinals		Final	
Athlete	Event	Time	Rank	Time	Rank	Time	Rank
Camille Muffat	Women's 100m Freestyle	54.35	5 Q	54.28	9	did not advance	
Camille Muffat	Women's 200m Freestyle	1:57.99	9 Q	1:56.62	4 Q	1:56.10	Bronze medal
Camille Muffat	Women's 400m Freestyle	4:05.62	2 Q			4:04.06	Bronze medal
Alexianne Castel	Women's 200m Backstroke	2:10.38	11 Q	2:08.41	5 Q	2:09.07	8
Mélanie Henique	Women's 50m Butterfly	26.37	8 Q	26.29	7 Q	25.86	Bronze medal
Lara Grangeon	Women's 400m IM	4:47.41	21			did not advance	
Camille Muffat; Coralie Balmy; Chorlotte Bonnet; Ophelie-Cyrielle Etienne	Women's 4 × 200 m Freestyle Relay	7:55.89	7 Q			7:52.22	4
Alexianne Castel; Sophie de Ronchi; Aurore Mongel; Camille Muffat	Women's 4 × 100 m Medley Relay	4:04.05	13			did not advance	

== Synchronised swimming ==
France has qualified 10 athletes in synchronised swimming.

Women

Athlete	Event	Preliminary		Final	
Athlete	Event	Points	Rank	Points	Rank
Sara Labrousse; Chloé Willhelm	Duet Technical Routine	88.500	9 Q	88.900	8
Sara Labrousse; Maïté Mejean	Duet Free Routine	88.740	8 Q	88.100	9
Laura Augé; Maëva Charbonnier; Margaux Chrétien; Chloé Kautzmann; Sara Labrousse; Maïté Mejean; Violaine Robert; Chloé Willhelm	Team Technical Routine	88.700	8 Q	88.600	8
Laura Augé; Maëva Charbonnier; Margaux Chrétien; Chloé Kautzmann; Sara Labrousse; Maïté Mejean; Violaine Robert; Chloé Willhelm	Team Free Routine	88.970	8 Q	87.840	8

Reserves

- Joannie Ciociola
- Charlotte Frackowiak
