= Open water swimming at the 2011 World Aquatics Championships – Women's 10 km =

Women's 10 km at the Open water swimming at the 2011 World Aquatics Championships
- Dates: 19 July

The women's 10 km competition of the open water swimming events at the 2011 World Aquatics Championships was held on July 19.

== Medalists ==
Gold	Silver	Bronze
Keri-anne Payne (GBR)	Martina Grimaldi (ITA)	Marianna Lymperta (GRE)

== Results ==
The final was held on July 19.

Rank	Swimmer	Nationality	Time
1st place, gold medalist(s)	Keri-anne Payne	Great Britain	2:01:58.1
2nd place, silver medalist(s)	Martina Grimaldi	Italy	2:01:59.9
3rd place, bronze medalist(s)	Marianna Lymperta	Greece	2:02:01.8
4	Melissa Gorman	Australia	2:02:12.0
5	Cecilia Biagioli	Argentina	2:02:12.0
6	Poliana Okimoto	Brazil	2:02:13.6
7	Jana Pechanová	Czech Republic	2:02:13.8
8	Angela Maurer	Germany	2:02:15.1
9	Swann Oberson	Switzerland	2:02:16.4
10	Erika Villaécija García	Spain	2:02:18.7
11	Ana Marcela Cunha	Brazil	2:02:22.2
12	Fang Yanqiao	China	2:02:24.6
13	Christine Jennings	United States	2:02:24.6
14	Teja Zupan	Slovenia	2:02:24.7
15	Olga Beresnyeva	Ukraine	2:02:25.1
16	Ophélie Aspord	France	2:02:28.3
17	Karla Šitić	Croatia	2:02:29.6
18	Kalliopi Araouzou	Greece	2:02:31.3
19	Andreina Pinto	Venezuela	2:02:32.5
20	Linsy Heister	Netherlands	2:02:33.6
21	Cassandra Patten	Great Britain	2:02:33.6
22	Cara Baker	New Zealand	2:02:34.0
23	Margarita Dominguez Cabezas	Spain	2:02:36.5
24	Ekaterina Seliverstova	Russia	2:03:18.4
25	Alejandra Gonzalez Lara	Mexico	2:03:25.8
26	Celia Barrot	France	2:03:43.7
27	Li Xue	China	2:04:39.9
28	Anna Uvarova	Russia	2:05:11.7
29	Silvie Rybarova	Czech Republic	2:05:30.5
30	Eva Fabian	United States	2:05:41.9
31	Danielle de Francesco	Australia	2:05:47.3
32	Inha Kotsur	Azerbaijan	2:06:00.1
33	Lizeth Rueda Santos	Mexico	2:06:52.1
34	Nataly Caldas	Ecuador	2:07:04.9
35	Yumi Kida	Japan	2:07:07.7
36	Isabell Donath	Germany	2:07:31.5
37	Nika Kozamernik	Slovenia	2:07:32.7
38	Iris Matthey	Switzerland	2:07:35.7
39	Natalie du Toit	South Africa	2:08:27.1
40	Zsofi Balazs	Canada	2:10:01.7
41	Alona Berbasova	Ukraine	2:11:05.2
42	Ayano Koguchi	Japan	2:11:48.9
43	Natasha Tang	Hong Kong	2:12:00.6
44	Nadine Williams	Canada	2:13:35.5
45	Jessica Roux	South Africa	2:16:34.5
46	Katia Barros	Ecuador	2:16:45.7
47	Chan Fiona On Yi	Hong Kong	2:17:31.3
48	Cindy Toscano	Guatemala	2:19:43.1
49	Laila El Basiouny	Egypt	2:20:15.4
50	Yessy Venisia Yosaputra	Indonesia	2:20:43.2
–	Yanel Pinto	Venezuela	DNF
–	Giorgia Consiglio	Italy	DNF
–	Merna Mohamed	Egypt	DNF
–	Anastasiya Zhidkova	Azerbaijan	DNF
–	Annisa Fabiola	Indonesia	DNF
–	Éva Risztov	Hungary	DSQ
