= Open water swimming at the 2011 World Aquatics Championships – Women's 5 km =

Women's 5 km at the Open water swimming at the 2011 World Aquatics Championships
- Dates: 22 July

The Women's 5 km competition of the Open water swimming events at the 2011 World Aquatics Championships was held on July 22.

== Medalists ==
Gold	Silver	Bronze
Swann Oberson (SUI)	Aurélie Muller (FRA)	Ashley Grace Twichell (USA)

== Results ==
The final was held on July 22.

Rank	Swimmer	Nationality	Time
1st place, gold medalist(s)	Swann Oberson	Switzerland	1:00:39.7
2nd place, silver medalist(s)	Aurélie Muller	France	1:00:40.1
3rd place, bronze medalist(s)	Ashley Twichell	United States	1:00:40.2
4	Rachele Bruni	Italy	1:00:42.2
5	Ekaterina Seliverstova	Russia	1:00:44.1
6	Ophélie Aspord	France	1:00:44.9
7	Ana Marcela Cunha	Brazil	1:00:46.7
8	Danielle de Francesco	Australia	1:00:46.8
9	Cara Baker	New Zealand	1:00:47.3
10	Jana Pechanová	Czech Republic	1:00:47.4
11	Poliana Okimoto	Brazil	1:00:48.3
12	Eva Fabian	United States	1:00:50.0
13	Elizaveta Gorshkova	Russia	1:00:50.4
14	Alice Franco	Italy	1:00:50.7
15	Teja Zupan	Slovenia	1:00:52.6
16	Isabelle Härle	Germany	1:00:52.9
17	Shi Yu	China	1:01:00.3
18	Marta Recio Paneque	Spain	1:01:01.9
19	Isabell Donath	Germany	1:01:06.2
20	Wang Hefei	China	1:01:06.8
21	Bonnie MacDonald	Australia	1:01:08.3
22	Inha Kotsur	Azerbaijan	1:01:15.4
23	Zaira Edith Cardenas Hernandez	Mexico	1:01:19.3
24	Iris Matthey	Switzerland	1:01:21.5
25	Alona Berbasova	Ukraine	1:01:22.6
26	Zsofi Balazs	Canada	1:01:39.0
27	Yanel Pinto	Venezuela	1:01:44.6
28	Lizeth Rueda Santos	Mexico	1:01:52.1
29	Nadine Williams	Canada	1:02:06.8
30	Katia Barros	Ecuador	1:02:19.7
31	Ayano Koguchi	Japan	1:03:20.2
32	Nataly Caldas	Ecuador	1:04:40.7
33	Nicole Brits	South Africa	1:04:53.1
34	Chan Fiona On Yi	Hong Kong	1:04:53.2
35	Yessy Venisia Yosaputra	Indonesia	1:04:56.1
36	Cindy Toscano	Guatemala	1:05:04.1
37	Laila El Basiouny	Egypt	1:06:15.3
38	Jessica Roux	South Africa	1:07:46.2
39	Merna Mohamed	Egypt	1:10:23.4
–	Cassandra Lily Patten	Great Britain	DNF
–	Annisa Fabiola	Indonesia	DNS
–	Kalliopi Araouzou	Greece	DSQ
–	Yumi Kida	Japan	DSQ
