= Switzerland at the 2011 World Aquatics Championships =

Sporting event delegation

Flag of Switzerland

Switzerland competed at the 2011 World Aquatics Championships in Shanghai, China between July 16 and 31, 2011.

== Medalists ==
Medal	Name	Sport	Event	Date
Gold	Swann Oberson	Open Water Swimming	Women's 5km	21 July

== Diving ==
Switzerland has qualified 1 athlete in diving.

Men

Athlete	Event	Preliminary		Semifinals		Final	
Athlete	Event	Points	Rank	Points	Rank	Points	Rank
Andrea Aloisio	Men's 1m Springboard	309.70	26			did not advance	
Andrea Aloisio	Men's 3m Springboard	300.10	48	did not advance			

== Open water swimming ==
Women

Athlete	Event	Final	
Athlete	Event	Time	Position
Iris Matthey	Women's 5km	1:01:21.5	24
Iris Matthey	Women's 10km	2:07:35.7	7
Swann Oberson	Women's 5km	1:00:39.7	Gold medal
Swann Oberson	Women's 10km	2:02:16.4	9

== Swimming ==
Switzerland qualified 5 swimmers.

Men

Athlete	Event	Heats		Semifinals		Final	
Athlete	Event	Time	Rank	Time	Rank	Time	Rank
Flori Lang	Men's 50m Freestyle	22.80	31	did not advance			
Flori Lang	Men's 100m Freestyle	49.86	34	did not advance			
Flori Lang	Men's 50m Backstroke	25.12	4 Q	25.07	7 Q	25.15	8
Flori Lang	Men's 100m Backstroke	56.40	40	did not advance			
Dominik Meichtry	Men's 200m Freestyle	1:47.38	7 Q	1:47.30	6 Q	1:47.02	7
Dominik Meichtry	Men's 400m Freestyle	3:51.32	22			did not advance	
Dominik Meichtry	Men's 100m Butterfly	55.54	32	did not advance			

Women

Athlete	Event	Heats		Semifinals		Final	
Athlete	Event	Time	Rank	Time	Rank	Time	Rank
Stephanie Spahn	Women's 50m Breaststroke	32.14	18	did not advance			
Stephanie Spahn	Women's 100m Breaststroke	1:11.13	30	did not advance			
Martina van Berjel	Women's 200m Butterfly	2:09.68	18	did not advance			
Marina Ribi	Women's 400m IM	4:52.49	30			did not advance	

== Synchronised swimming ==
Switzerland has qualified 9 athletes in synchronised swimming.

Women

Athlete	Event	Preliminary		Final	
Athlete	Event	Points	Rank	Points	Rank
Pamela Fischer	Solo Free Routine	82.960	15	did not advance	
Pamela Fischer; Anja Nyffeler	Duet Technical Routine	83.200	19	did not advance	
Pamela Fischer; Anja Nyffeler	Duet Free Routine	83.060	19	did not advance	
Roxane Begg; Audrey Canova; Laura Ermano; Pamela Fischer; Anja Nyffeler; Eve Tieche; Pascale Zwicky; Simone Zwicky	Team Technical Routine	82.300	16	did not advance	
Roxane Begg; Audrey Canova; Laura Ermano; Pamela Fischer; Anja Nyffeler; Eve Tieche; Pascale Zwicky; Simone Zwicky	Team Free Routine	83.640	14	did not advance	

Reserve

- Matilda Wunderlin
