= Swimming at the 2011 World Aquatics Championships – Men's 50 metre freestyle =

Men's 50 metre freestyle at the 2011 World Aquatics Championships
- Dates: July 29, 2011 (heats and semifinals); July 30, 2011 (final)
- Competitors: 121 from 96 nations
- Winning time: 21.52

Medalists
gold medal	César Cielo	Brazil
silver medal	Luca Dotto	Italy
bronze medal	Alain Bernard	France

The men's 50 metre freestyle competition of the swimming events at the 2011 World Aquatics Championships was held on July 29 with the heats and the semifinals and July 30 with the final.

== Records ==
Prior to the competition, the existing world and championship records were as follows.

	Name	Nation	Time	Location	Date
World record	César Cielo	Brazil	20.91	São Paulo	December 18, 2009
Championship record	César Cielo	Brazil	21.08	Rome	August 1, 2009

== Results ==
=== Heats ===
117 swimmers participated in 16 heats.

Rank	Heat	Lane	Name	Nationality	Time	Notes
1	14	4	César Cielo	Brazil	22.03	Q
1	15	4	Nathan Adrian	United States	22.03	Q
1	15	8	George Bovell	Trinidad and Tobago	22.03	Q
4	16	8	Adam Brown	Great Britain	22.08	Q
5	15	2	Krisztián Takács	Hungary	22.15	Q
5	16	5	Stefan Nystrand	Sweden	22.15	Q
7	15	1	Sergey Fesikov	Russia	22.16	Q
7	16	1	Marco Orsi	Italy	22.16	Q
9	16	6	Matthew Abood	Australia	22.17	Q
10	15	3	Alain Bernard	France	22.19	Q
11	16	2	Gideon Louw	South Africa	22.21	Q
12	15	6	Luca Dotto	Italy	22.25	Q
13	14	5	Bruno Fratus	Brazil	22.26	Q
14	15	7	Matt Targett	Australia	22.31	Q
15	16	7	Roland Schoeman	South Africa	22.32	Q
16	14	3	Andrey Grechin	Russia	22.33	Q
17	15	5	Brent Hayden	Canada	22.34	
17	13	1	David Dunford	Kenya	22.34	
19	14	8	Dominik Kozma	Hungary	22.36	
20	16	3	Cullen Jones	United States	22.37	
21	16	4	Frédérick Bousquet	France	22.38	
22	14	6	Andriy Govorov	Ukraine	22.51	
23	14	7	Simon Burnett	Great Britain	22.54	
24	13	4	Lü Zhiwu	China	22.55	
25	11	5	Brett Fraser	Cayman Islands	22.65	
25	14	2	Marco di Carli	Germany	22.65	
27	13	3	Ari-Pekka Liukkonen	Finland	22.67	
28	12	8	Roy-Allan Burch	Bermuda	22.69	NR
29	12	4	Hanser García	Cuba	22.72	
30	13	2	Jasper Aerents	Belgium	22.73	
31	13	8	Flori Lang	Switzerland	22.80	
32	13	6	Alexandre Agosthino	Portugal	22.81	
33	13	7	Odysseas Meladinis	Greece	22.90	
34	12	3	Mindaugas Sadauskas	Lithuania	22.95	
35	12	1	Barry Murphy	Ireland	22.96	
36	14	1	Filip Rypych	Poland	22.99	
37	13	5	Elvis Burrows	Bahamas	23.14	
38	12	7	Shehab Younis	Egypt	23.17	
39	11	4	Sidni Hoxha	Albania	23.18	NR
40	12	6	Virdhawal Khade	India	23.21	
41	12	5	Juan Manuel Cambindo	Colombia	23.31	
42	11	3	Ivars Akmentiņš	Latvia	23.57	
43	10	4	Andrew Chetcuti	Malta	23.65	
44	10	2	Amine Kouame	Morocco	23.83	
45	9	4	Luke Hall	Eswatini	23.92	
46	10	3	Yellow Yeiyah	Nigeria	24.01	
46	11	2	Oliver Elliot	Chile	24.01	
48	10	6	José Montoya	Costa Rica	24.12	
49	11	8	Anthony Clark	French Polynesia	24.15	
50	11	6	Serghei Golban	Moldova	24.23	
51	11	1	Mohammad Bidaryan	Iran	24.33	
52	11	7	Kareem Ennab	Jordan	24.35	
53	9	7	Chakyl Camal	Mozambique	24.40	
54	9	5	Christopher Duenas	Guam	24.41	
55	10	5	Mikael Koloyan	Armenia	24.45	
56	9	2	Julien Brice	Saint Lucia	24.59	
57	8	3	Heshan Unamboowe	Sri Lanka	24.64	
57	9	3	Gerard Baldrich Pujol	Andorra	24.64	
59	10	1	Kevin Avila	Guatemala	24.66	
60	8	6	Esau Simpson	Grenada	24.72	
61	9	6	Nicholas Coard	Grenada	24.78	
62	9	8	Niall Roberts	Guyana	24.80	
63	8	4	Mahfizur Rahman Sagor	Bangladesh	24.82	
64	10	8	Abbas Raad	Lebanon	24.95	
65	8	7	Sergey Krovyakov	Turkmenistan	25.11	
66	4	8	Adama Ouedraogo	Burkina Faso	25.33	
67	9	1	Emile Bakale	Congo	25.38	
68	7	7	Mark Thompson	Zambia	25.70	
69	7	1	Indra Rakotondrazanaka	Madagascar	25.72	
69	8	5	Kerson Hadley	Micronesia	25.72	
71	7	5	Kouassi Brou	Ivory Coast	25.81	
72	7	2	Christian Nikles	Brunei	25.86	
73	6	3	Tolga Akcayli	Saint Vincent and the Grenadines	25.96	
74	7	8	Mamadou Soumare	Mali	26.05	
75	10	7	Tamir Andryei	Mongolia	26.26	
76	8	1	John Kamyuka	Botswana	26.30	
77	8	2	Shane Mangroo	Seychelles	26.32	
78	7	3	Zachary Payne	Cook Islands	26.50	
79	6	4	Tawil Majd	Palestine	26.65	
80	6	5	Israr Hussain	Pakistan	27.03	
81	6	8	Hemthon Ponloeu	Cambodia	27.22	
82	6	7	Prasiddha Jung Shah	Nepal	27.30	
83	5	7	Chamraen Youri Maximov	Cambodia	27.48	
84	6	1	Ganzi Mugula	Uganda	27.58	
84	4	3	Paul Edingue Ekane	Cameroon	27.58	
84	6	6	Shailesh Shumsher Rana	Nepal	27.58	
87	3	2	Mohamed Abd Elrawf Mahmoud	Sudan	27.67	
88	4	4	Abdourahman Osman	Djibouti	27.69	
89	4	5	Farhan Sultan	Bahrain	27.70	
90	4	2	Giordan Harris	Marshall Islands	27.71	
91	2	2	Jackson Niyomugabo	Rwanda	27.73	
91	3	6	Ching Maou Wei	American Samoa	27.73	
93	2	7	Patrick Rukundo	Rwanda	28.08	
94	5	6	Zandan Gunsennorou	Mongolia	28.14	
95	3	4	Shawn Dingilius-Wallace	Palau	28.21	
96	8	8	Athoumani Youssouf	Comoros	28.52	
97	4	6	Jeffrey Orel	Antigua and Barbuda	28.57	
98	5	3	Conrad Gaira	Uganda	28.65	
99	5	8	Mulualem Girma Teshale	Ethiopia	28.81	
100	7	4	Ahmed Chawali	Comoros	28.82	
101	3	8	Phathana Inthavong	Laos	28.94	
102	5	2	Alisher Chingizov	Tajikistan	29.05	
103	4	7	Ammaar Ghadiyali	Tanzania	29.23	
104	4	1	Anauska Ndinga	Congo	29.24	
105	2	4	Mohamed Eltayeb	Sudan	29.49	
106	1	4	Christian Nassif	Central African Republic	29.71	
107	5	4	Amadou Camara	Guinea	29.72	
108	3	3	Wilfrid Tevoedjre	Benin	31.49	
109	2	5	Daniel Langinbelik	Marshall Islands	31.73	
110	3	1	Iourhanta Mohamed Osman	Djibouti	31.79	
111	7	6	Seele Benjamin Ntai	Lesotho	32.74	
112	3	7	Mohamed Mamaiv Sani	Niger	33.37	
113	3	5	Razak Marafa	Niger	33.83	
114	5	5	Tsepo Mafa	Lesotho	34.54	
115	1	5	Gailloty Croyeb	Central African Republic	35.11	
116	2	3	Eycub Leebeid	Mauritania	45.18	
–	1	3	Yau Mutas	DR Congo		DNS
–	2	6	Hamza Labeid	Mauritania		DSQ
–	5	1	Mamot Faye	Gambia		DNS
–	6	2	Folarin Ogunsola	Gambia		DNS
–	12	2	Nabil Kebbab	Algeria		DNS

=== Semifinals ===
The semifinals were held at 18:35.

==== Semifinal 1 ====
Rank	Lane	Name	Nationality	Time	Notes
1	4	Nathan Adrian	United States	21.94	Q
2	7	Luca Dotto	Italy	21.97	Q
3	2	Alain Bernard	France	22.07	Q
4	1	Matt Targett	Australia	22.09	
5	6	Marco Orsi	Italy	22.13	
6	5	Adam Brown	Great Britain	22.21	
7	3	Stefan Nystrand	Sweden	22.23	
8	8	Andrey Grechin	Russia	22.36	

==== Semifinal 2 ====
Rank	Lane	Name	Nationality	Time	Notes
1	1	Bruno Fratus	Brazil	21.76	Q
2	4	César Cielo	Brazil	21.79	Q
3	3	Krisztián Takács	Hungary	21.97	Q
4	5	George Bovell	Trinidad and Tobago	22.02	Q
4	7	Gideon Louw	South Africa	22.02	Q
6	6	Sergey Fesikov	Russia	22.09	
7	2	Matthew Abood	Australia	22.16	
8	8	Roland Schoeman	South Africa	22.42	

=== Swimoff ===
Rank	Lane	Name	Nationality	Time	Notes
1	4	Matt Targett	Australia	22.15	
2	5	Sergey Fesikov	Russia	22.32	

=== Final ===
The final was held at 18:09.

Rank	Lane	Name	Nationality	Time	Notes
1st place, gold medalist(s)	5	César Cielo	Brazil	21.52	
2nd place, silver medalist(s)	6	Luca Dotto	Italy	21.90	
3rd place, bronze medalist(s)	8	Alain Bernard	France	21.92	
4	3	Nathan Adrian	United States	21.93	
5	4	Bruno Fratus	Brazil	21.96	
6	2	Krisztián Takács	Hungary	21.99	
7	1	George Bovell	Trinidad and Tobago	22.04	
8	7	Gideon Louw	South Africa	22.11	
