= Swimming at the 2011 World Aquatics Championships – Men's 100 metre freestyle =

Men's 100 metre freestyle at the 2011 World Aquatics Championships
- Dates: July 27, 2011 (heats and semifinals); July 28, 2011 (final)
- Competitors: 108 from 89 nations
- Winning time: 47.63

Medalists
gold medal	James Magnussen	Australia
silver medal	Brent Hayden	Canada
bronze medal	William Meynard	France

The men's 100 metre freestyle competition of the swimming events at the 2011 World Aquatics Championships was held on July 27 with the heats and the semifinals and July 28 with the finale.

== Records ==
Prior to the competition, the existing world and championship records were as follows.

	Name	Nation	Time	Location	Date
World record Championship record	César Cielo	Brazil	46.91	Rome	July 30, 2009

== Results ==
=== Heats ===
106 swimmers participated in 14 heats.

Rank	Heat	Lane	Name	Nationality	Time	Notes
1	12	3	William Meynard	France	48.14	Q
2	13	5	James Magnussen	Australia	48.21	Q
3	14	2	Filippo Magnini	Italy	48.36	Q
4	12	4	César Cielo	Brazil	48.41	Q
5	12	5	Fabien Gilot	France	48.48	Q
6	13	6	Andrey Grechin	Russia	48.59	Q
7	13	7	Sebastiaan Verschuren	Netherlands	48.60	Q
8	13	4	Nathan Adrian	United States	48.62	Q
9	14	1	Graeme Moore	South Africa	48.65	Q
10	11	4	Gideon Louw	South Africa	48.74	Q
11	14	4	Brent Hayden	Canada	48.75	Q
12	12	6	Nikita Lobintsev	Russia	48.78	Q
13	14	6	Luca Dotto	Italy	48.79	Q
14	13	2	Park Tae-Hwan	South Korea	48.91	Q
15	12	7	Konrad Czerniak	Poland	48.92	Q
16	14	7	James Roberts	Australia	48.93	Q
17	10	8	Brett Fraser	Cayman Islands	48.98	
18	10	5	Hanser García	Cuba	48.99	
19	14	5	Marco di Carli	Germany	49.00	
20	14	3	Jason Lezak	United States	49.03	
21	12	1	Adam Brown	Great Britain	49.13	
21	14	8	Takuro Fujii	Japan	49.13	
23	9	4	David Dunford	Kenya	49.20	
24	12	2	Bruno Fratus	Brazil	49.23	
25	13	3	Simon Burnett	Great Britain	49.25	
26	12	8	Lü Zhiwu	China	49.26	
27	11	3	Dominik Kozma	Hungary	49.49	
28	11	2	Martin Verner	Czech Republic	49.52	
29	10	6	Mindaugas Sadauskas	Lithuania	49.66	
30	11	8	Odysseas Meladinis	Greece	49.71	
31	11	1	Jasper Aerents	Belgium	49.75	
32	13	1	Stefan Nystrand	Sweden	49.80	
33	10	7	Nabil Kebbab	Algeria	49.85	
34	10	4	Flori Lang	Switzerland	49.86	
35	11	6	Nimrod Shapira Bar-Or	Israel	49.91	
36	10	2	Ben Hockin	Paraguay	50.03	
37	11	7	Velimir Stjepanović	Serbia	50.14	
38	10	3	Mario Todorović	Croatia	50.16	
38	11	5	Jiang Haiqi	China	50.16	
40	10	1	Crox Ernesto Acuna	Venezuela	50.28	
41	9	2	Gabriel Melconian	Uruguay	50.34	
41	9	5	Virdhaval Vikram Khade	India	50.34	
41	9	7	Ryan Pini	Papua New Guinea	50.34	
44	8	1	Uvis Kalnins	Latvia	50.46	
45	9	3	Alexandre Agostinho	Portugal	50.71	
46	7	4	Branden Whitehurst	U.S. Virgin Islands	50.95	
47	7	5	Roy-Allan Burch	Bermuda	51.01	NR
48	8	7	Sidni Hoxha	Albania	51.51	
49	8	4	Ensar Hajder	Bosnia and Herzegovina	51.52	
50	9	6	Matias Aguilera	Argentina	51.62	
51	8	5	Charles William Walker	Philippines	51.72	
52	8	8	Ivars Akmentins	Latvia	51.89	
53	8	6	Shebab Younis	Egypt	51.95	
54	7	8	Amine Kouame	Morocco	52.05	NR
55	9	1	Hoàng Quý Phước	Vietnam	52.11	
56	8	2	Mohammad Bidarian	Iran	52.42	
57	6	5	Luke Hall	Eswatini	52.45	
58	7	7	Jemal le Grand	Aruba	52.62	
59	6	7	Quinton Delie	Namibia	52.74	
60	6	4	José Montoya	Costa Rica	52.96	
61	7	2	Kevin Avila	Guatemala	53.03	
62	8	3	Mohamed Madouh	Kuwait	53.07	
63	9	8	Phạm Thành Nguyện	Vietnam	53.10	
64	7	6	Mikael Koloyan	Armenia	53.12	
65	6	6	Gerard Baldrich Pujol	Andorra	53.21	NR
66	7	1	Christopher Duenas	Guam	53.33	
67	6	8	Andrew Rutherfurd	Bolivia	53.57	
68	5	8	Esau Simpson	Grenada	53.85	
69	6	3	Kareem Ennab	Jordan	53.92	
70	6	2	Nicholas Coard	Grenada	53.94	
71	6	1	Mahfizur Rahman Sagor	Bangladesh	54.18	
72	5	4	Anthony Clark	French Polynesia	54.51	
73	5	2	Abbas Raad	Lebanon	54.91	
74	5	1	Niall Roberts	Guyana	54.99	
74	5	3	Chakyl Camal	Mozambique	54.99	
74	5	7	Julien Brice	Saint Lucia	54.99	
77	4	3	Sergey Krovyakov	Turkmenistan	55.99	
78	4	2	Douglas Miller	Fiji	56.06	
79	5	6	Sofyan El Gadi	Libya	56.45	
80	4	4	Omar Núñez	Nicaragua	56.76	
81	4	1	Christian Nikles	Brunei	57.44	
82	5	5	Tamir Andrei	Mongolia	57.52	
83	4	7	Israr Hussain	Pakistan	57.69	
84	4	5	Shane Mangroo	Seychelles	57.85	
85	4	8	Mamadou Soumare	Mali	58.21	
86	4	6	Tepaia Payne	Cook Islands	58.59	
87	3	5	Atta Tano Claver	Ivory Coast	59.70	
88	3	1	Husam Ahmed	Maldives	59.98	
89	3	2	Inayath Hassan	Maldives	1:01.75	
90	2	6	Farhan Farhan	Bahrain	1:01.76	
91	3	6	Zangan Gunsennorou	Mongolia	1:01.80	
92	2	4	Prasiddha Jung Shah	Nepal	1:01.84	
93	3	7	Shailesh Shumsher Rana	Nepal	1:01.94	
94	3	4	Dionisio Augustine II	Micronesia	1:02.41	
95	2	2	Shawn Dingilius-Wallace	Palau	1:02.53	
95	2	1	Giordan Harris	Marshall Islands	1:02.53	
97	2	3	Fdingue Ekane	Cameroon	1:02.65	
98	2	5	Beni-Bertrand Binobagira	Burundi	1:03.39	
99	3	8	Ammaar Ghadiyali	Tanzania	1:03.98	
100	3	3	Athoumani Youssouf	Comoros	1:04.75	
101	1	4	Amadou Camara	Guinea	1:06.25	
102	2	7	Kyle Zreibe	Antigua and Barbuda	1:07.35	
103	1	6	Daniel Langinbelik	Marshall Islands	1:12.52	
104	1	3	Godonou Wilfrid Tevoedjre	Benin	1:14.08	
105	2	8	Janvier Niyonkuru	Burundi	1:16.00	
-	1	5	Ahmed Chawali	Comoros		DSQ
-	7	3	Brad Hamilton	Jamaica		DNS
-	13	8	Markus Deibler	Germany		DNS

=== Semifinals ===
The semifinals were held at 18:02.

==== Semifinal 1 ====
Rank	Lane	Name	Nationality	Time	Notes
1	4	James Magnussen	Australia	47.90	Q
2	6	Nathan Adrian	United States	48.05	Q
3	5	César Cielo	Brazil	48.34	Q
4	8	James Roberts	Australia	48.49	
5	3	Andrey Grechin	Russia	48.67	
6	1	Park Tae-Hwan	South Korea	48.86	
7	2	Gideon Louw	South Africa	48.96	
8	7	Nikita Lobintsev	Russia	49.00	

==== Semifinal 2 ====
Rank	Lane	Name	Nationality	Time	Notes
1	4	William Meynard	France	48.25	Q
2	7	Brent Hayden	Canada	48.30	Q
3	6	Sebastiaan Verschuren	Netherlands	48.41	Q
4	1	Luca Dotto	Italy	48.44	Q
5	3	Fabien Gilot	France	48.46	Q
6	8	Konrad Czerniak	Poland	48.48	
7	5	Filippo Magnini	Italy	48.50	
8	2	Graeme Moore	South Africa	48.59	

=== Final ===
The final was held at 18.35.

Rank	Lane	Name	Nationality	Time	Notes
1st place, gold medalist(s)	4	James Magnussen	Australia	47.63	
2nd place, silver medalist(s)	6	Brent Hayden	Canada	47.95	
3rd place, bronze medalist(s)	3	William Meynard	France	48.00	
4	2	César Cielo	Brazil	48.01	
5	8	Fabien Gilot	France	48.13	
6	5	Nathan Adrian	United States	48.23	
7	1	Luca Dotto	Italy	48.24	
8	7	Sebastiaan Verschuren	Netherlands	48.27	
