= Open water swimming at the 2011 World Aquatics Championships – Men's 10 km =

Men's 10 km at the Open water swimming at the 2011 World Aquatics Championships
- Dates: 20 July

The men's 10 km competition of the open water swimming events at the 2011 World Aquatics Championships was held on July 20.

== Medalists ==
Gold	Silver	Bronze
Spyridon Gianniotis (GRE)	Thomas Lurz (GER)	Sergey Bolshakov (RUS)

== Results ==
The final was held on July 20.

Rank	Swimmer	Nationality	Time
1st place, gold medalist(s)	Spyridon Gianniotis	Greece	1:54:24.7
2nd place, silver medalist(s)	Thomas Lurz	Germany	1:54:27.2
3rd place, bronze medalist(s)	Sergey Bolshakov	Russia	1:54:31.8
4	Alex Meyer	United States	1:54:33.1
5	Ky Hurst	Australia	1:54:33.9
6	Francisco Jose Hervas Jodar	Spain	1:54:34.3
7	Brian Ryckeman	Belgium	1:54:36.1
8	Julien Sauvage	France	1:54:37.2
9	Vladimir Dyatchin	Russia	1:54:38.7
10	Andreas Waschburger	Germany	1:54:39.8
11	Valerio Cleri	Italy	1:54:41.2
12	Tom Vangeneugden	Belgium	1:54:43.5
13	Yuri Kudinov	Kazakhstan	1:54:45.1
14	Sergey Fesenko	Azerbaijan	1:54:45.2
15	Daniel Lee Fogg	Great Britain	1:54:46.9
16	Sebastien Fraysse	France	1:54:50.2
17	Richard Weinberger	Canada	1:54:51.3
18	Guillermo Bertola	Argentina	1:54:54.9
19	Igor Snitko	Ukraine	1:54:55.6
20	Chad Ho	South Africa	1:54:58.6
21	Igor Chervynskiy	Ukraine	1:54:58.7
22	Luis Ricardo Escobar Torrers	Mexico	1:54:59.5
23	Antonios Fokaidis	Greece	1:55:02.1
24	Zhang Zibin	China	1:55:20.2
25	Sean Ryan	United States	1:55:35.7
26	Thomas James Allen	Great Britain	1:55:37.4
27	Petar Stoychev	Bulgaria	1:55:39.5
28	Luca Ferretti	Italy	1:55:45.2
29	Saleh Mohamed	Syria	1:55:47.6
30	Rhys Mainstone	Australia	1:55:51.5
31	Ivan Enderica	Ecuador	1:55:51.9
32	Jan Posmourny	Czech Republic	1:56:50.2
33	Chris Bryan	Ireland	1:56:52.8
33	Erwin Maldonado	Venezuela	1:56:52.8
35	Csaba Gercsák	Hungary	1:56:58.9
36	Yasunari Hirai	Japan	1:58:19.2
37	Yuval Safra	Israel	1:58:48.3
38	Troy Prinsloo	South Africa	1:58:48.5
39	Hector Ruis Perez	Spain	1:59:15.5
40	Damián Blaum	Argentina	1:59:44.1
41	Jiang Tiansheng	China	2:00:45.0
42	Rok Kerin	Slovenia	2:01:04.7
43	Johndry Segovia	Venezuela	2:01:17.2
44	Gergely Kutasi	Hungary	2:02:17.2
44	Samuel de Bona	Brazil	2:02:17.2
46	Alvaro Trewhela	Chile	2:03:20.4
47	Arseniy Lavrentyev	Portugal	2:03:51.9
48	Mazen Mohamed Aziz	Egypt	2:03:52.4
49	Aimeson King	Canada	2:04:00.1
50	Allan do Carmo	Brazil	2:05:42.5
51	Josip Soldo	Croatia	2:08:12.9
52	Islam Mohsen	Egypt	2:11:37.2
53	Mussallam Al Khaduri	Oman	2:11:41.2
54	Mandar Divase	India	2:12:15.8
55	Yuen Marcus Yat Ho	Hong Kong	2:12:23.9
56	Mohammed Al-Habsi	Oman	2:12:25.8
57	Tomislav Soldo	Croatia	2:12:30.2
58	Kevin Basquez	Guatemala	2:13:19.2
59	Ricky Anggawijaya	Indonesia	2:13:47.4
60	Arnoczy Kusadewa Pratama	Indonesia	2:13:48.4
61	Bekshe Zhumagali	Kazakhstan	2:18:29.3
62	Ling Tin Yu	Hong Kong	2:20:13.8
–	Jeffry Villalobos	Costa Rica	OTL
–	Sufyan Shaikh	India	OTL
–	Santiago Enderica	Ecuador	DNF
–	Ivan de Jesus Lopez Ramos	Mexico	DNF
–	Rostislav Vitek	Czech Republic	DNF
–	Rodolfo Sanchez	Costa Rica	DNS
