= Swimming at the 2011 World Aquatics Championships – Men's 100 metre backstroke =

Men's 100 metre backstroke at the 2011 World Aquatics Championships
- Dates: July 25, 2011 (heats and semifinals); July 26, 2011 (final)
- Competitors: 50 from 36 nations
- Winning time: 52.76

Medalists
| gold medal | Jérémy Stravius | France |
| gold medal | Camille Lacourt | France |
| bronze medal | Ryosuke Irie | Japan |

The men's 100 metre backstroke competition of the swimming events at the 2011 World Aquatics Championships was held on July 25 with the preliminary round and the semifinals and July 26 with the final.

== Records ==
Prior to the competition, the existing world and championship records were as follows.

| | Name | Nation | Time | Location | Date |
|---|---|---|---|---|---|
| World record | Aaron Peirsol | United States | 51.94 | Indianapolis | July 8, 2009 |
| Championship record | Aaron Peirsol | United States | 52.19 | Rome | August 2, 2009 |

== Results ==
=== Heats ===
50 swimmer participated in 7 heats.

| Rank | Heat | Lane | Name | Nationality | Time | Notes |
|---|---|---|---|---|---|---|
| 1 | 7 | 4 | Camille Lacourt | France | 53.30 | Q |
| 2 | 6 | 5 | Jérémy Stravius | France | 53.34 | Q |
| 3 | 7 | 5 | David Plummer | United States | 53.68 | Q |
| 4 | 6 | 4 | Liam Tancock | Great Britain | 53.84 | Q |
| 5 | 6 | 6 | Stanislav Donets | Russia | 53.85 | Q |
| 6 | 5 | 6 | Ben Treffers | Australia | 53.89 | Q |
| 7 | 7 | 8 | Gareth Kean | New Zealand | 53.89 | Q |
| 8 | 5 | 4 | Ryosuke Irie | Japan | 53.99 | Q |
| 9 | 7 | 3 | Hayden Stoeckel | Australia | 54.05 | Q |
| 10 | 5 | 3 | Nick Thoman | United States | 54.13 | Q |
| 11 | 7 | 6 | Aschwin Wildeboer | Spain | 54.14 | Q |
| 12 | 5 | 5 | Helge Meeuw | Germany | 54.15 | Q |
| 13 | 7 | 7 | Aristeidis Grigoriadis | Greece | 54.26 | Q |
| 14 | 5 | 2 | Nick Driebergen | Netherlands | 54.30 | Q |
| 15 | 6 | 3 | Junya Koga | Japan | 54.32 | Q |
| 16 | 4 | 1 | Guy Barnea | Israel | 54.43 | swimoff |
| 16 | 6 | 1 | Sun Xiaolei | China | 54.43 | swimoff |
| 18 | 4 | 5 | Thiago Pereira | Brazil | 54.47 | |
| 19 | 6 | 7 | Mirco di Tora | Italy | 54.47 | |
| 20 | 6 | 2 | Cheng Feiyi | China | 54.60 | |
| 21 | 7 | 2 | Vitaly Borisov | Russia | 54.66 | |
| 22 | 4 | 7 | Charles Francis | Canada | 54.68 | |
| 23 | 7 | 1 | Daniel Bell | New Zealand | 54.75 | |
| 24 | 2 | 4 | Omar Pinzón | Colombia | 54.88 | NR |
| 25 | 5 | 8 | Jonatan Kopelev | Israel | 54.90 | |
| 26 | 5 | 1 | Chris Walker-Hebborn | Great Britain | 54.91 | |
| 27 | 4 | 4 | Guilherme Guido | Brazil | 54.93 | |
| 28 | 4 | 6 | Radosław Kawęcki | Poland | 55.01 | |
| 29 | 5 | 7 | Bastiaan Lijesen | Netherlands | 55.09 | |
| 30 | 4 | 2 | Charl Crous | South Africa | 55.14 | |
| 31 | 3 | 5 | Gerhard Zandberg | South Africa | 55.21 | |
| 32 | 4 | 8 | Tobias Oriwol | Canada | 55.27 | |
| 33 | 4 | 3 | Marcin Tarczyński | Poland | 55.28 | |
| 34 | 3 | 3 | Péter Bernek | Hungary | 55.32 | |
| 35 | 6 | 8 | Park Seon-Kwan | South Korea | 55.39 | |
| 36 | 3 | 1 | Bradley Ally | Barbados | 55.88 | NR |
| 37 | 3 | 6 | Federico Grabich | Argentina | 55.93 | |
| 38 | 3 | 4 | Simon Sjödin | Sweden | 56.06 | |
| 39 | 3 | 8 | Matas Andriekus | Lithuania | 56.10 | |
| 40 | 3 | 7 | Flori Lang | Switzerland | 56.40 | |
| 41 | 3 | 2 | Abdullah Al-Tuwaini | Kuwait | 56.94 | |
| 42 | 2 | 3 | Jean-François Schneiders | Luxembourg | 57.03 | NR |
| 43 | 2 | 7 | Heshan Unamboowe | Sri Lanka | 57.95 | |
| 44 | 2 | 5 | Alex Hernandez Medina | Cuba | 58.15 | |
| 45 | 2 | 6 | Charles William Walker | Philippines | 58.82 | |
| 46 | 1 | 4 | Zane Jordan | Zambia | 59.33 | |
| 47 | 1 | 5 | Antonio Tong | Macau | 1:00.34 | |
| 48 | 2 | 1 | Awse Ma'aya | Jordan | 1:00.64 | |
| 49 | 2 | 2 | Boris Kirillov | Azerbaijan | 1:01.03 | |
| 50 | 1 | 3 | Andrey Molchanov | Turkmenistan | 1:05.39 | |

=== Swimoff ===
As two swimmers had the same time in the heats at place 16 they had to participate in a swimoff to determine the last semifinal swimmer, it was held at 11:36.

| Rank | Lane | Name | Nationality | Time | Notes |
|---|---|---|---|---|---|
| 1 | 5 | Sun Xiaolei | China | 54.20 | Q |
| 2 | 4 | Guy Barnea | Israel | 55.12 | |

=== Semifinals ===
The semifinals were held at 18:10.

==== Semifinal 1 ====
| Rank | Lane | Name | Nationality | Time | Notes |
|---|---|---|---|---|---|
| 1 | 4 | Jérémy Stravius | France | 52.76 | Q |
| 2 | 6 | Ryosuke Irie | Japan | 53.05 | Q |
| 3 | 7 | Helge Meeuw | Germany | 53.34 | Q |
| 4 | 2 | Nick Thoman | United States | 53.49 | Q |
| 5 | 5 | Liam Tancock | Great Britain | 53.60 | Q |
| 6 | 3 | Ben Treffers | Australia | 53.87 | |
| 7 | 1 | Nick Driebergen | Netherlands | 53.98 | |
| 8 | 8 | Sun Xiaolei | China | 54.21 | |

==== Semifinal 2 ====
| Rank | Lane | Name | Nationality | Time | Notes |
|---|---|---|---|---|---|
| 1 | 4 | Camille Lacourt | France | 53.09 | Q |
| 2 | 5 | David Plummer | United States | 53.30 | Q |
| 3 | 6 | Gareth Kean | New Zealand | 53.69 | Q |
| 4 | 2 | Hayden Stoeckel | Australia | 53.70 | |
| 5 | 7 | Aschwin Wildeboer | Spain | 54.03 | |
| 6 | 3 | Stanislav Donets | Russia | 54.10 | |
| 7 | 8 | Junya Koga | Japan | 54.16 | |
| 8 | 1 | Aristeidis Grigoriadis | Greece | 54.22 | |

=== Final ===
The final was held at 19:06.

| Rank | Lane | Name | Nationality | Time | Notes |
|---|---|---|---|---|---|
| 1st place, gold medalist(s) | 3 | Camille Lacourt | France | 52.76 | |
| 1st place, gold medalist(s) | 4 | Jérémy Stravius | France | 52.76 | |
| 3rd place, bronze medalist(s) | 5 | Ryosuke Irie | Japan | 52.98 | |
| 4 | 7 | Nick Thoman | United States | 53.01 | |
| 5 | 6 | David Plummer | United States | 53.04 | |
| 6 | 1 | Liam Tancock | Great Britain | 53.25 | |
| 7 | 2 | Helge Meeuw | Germany | 53.28 | |
| 8 | 8 | Gareth Kean | New Zealand | 53.50 | NR |
