= Swimming at the 2011 World Aquatics Championships – Women's 400 metre freestyle =

Women's 400 metre freestyle at the 2011 World Aquatics Championships
- Dates: July 24, 2011 (heats and final)
- Competitors: 38 from 31 nations
- Winning time: 4:01.97

Medalists
gold medal	Federica Pellegrini	Italy
silver medal	Rebecca Adlington	Great Britain
bronze medal	Camille Muffat	France

The women's 400 metre freestyle competition of the swimming events at the 2011 World Aquatics Championships took place July 24. The heats and the final took place on July 24.

== Records ==
Prior to the competition, the existing world and championship records were as follows.

	Name	Nation	Time	Location	Date
World record Championship record	Federica Pellegrini	Italy	3:59.15	Rome	July 26, 2009

== Results ==
=== Heats ===
38 swimmers participated in 5 heats, qualified swimmers are listed:

Rank	Heat	Lane	Name	Nationality	Time	Notes
1	4	4	Federica Pellegrini	Italy	4:04.76	Q
2	3	4	Camille Muffat	France	4:05.62	Q
3	5	2	Lauren Boyle	New Zealand	4:05.86	Q, NR
4	3	6	Lotte Friis	Denmark	4:06.31	Q
5	5	5	Kylie Palmer	Australia	4:06.38	Q
6	4	6	Melania Costa Schmid	Spain	4:07.02	Q, NR
7	5	4	Rebecca Adlington	Great Britain	4:07.38	Q
8	5	3	Katie Hoff	United States	4:07.93	Q
9	3	5	Chloe Sutton	United States	4:08.22	
10	3	3	Shao Yiwen	China	4:08.42	
11	4	5	Bronte Barratt	Australia	4:08.62	
12	5	1	Andreina Pinto	Venezuela	4:08.80	NR
13	4	7	Barbara Jardin	Canada	4:08.81	
14	3	2	Boglárka Kapás	Hungary	4:09.15	
15	4	3	Jazmin Carlin	Great Britain	4:09.64	
16	5	7	Samantha Cheverton	Canada	4:09.81	
17	4	2	Camelia Potec	Romania	4:10.36	
18	3	7	Wendy Trott	South Africa	4:10.57	
19	2	4	Nina Rangelova	Bulgaria	4:12.38	NR
20	4	1	Charetzeni Escobar	Mexico	4:13.38	
21	4	8	Anna Stylianou	Cyprus	4:15.46	NR
22	2	5	Daryna Zevina	Ukraine	4:15.65	
23	5	6	Song Wenyan	China	4:16.26	
24	2	2	Sycerika McMahon	Ireland	4:16.44	
25	2	6	Julia Hassler	Liechtenstein	4:17.61	NR
26	2	3	Virginia Bardach	Argentina	4:18.57	
27	3	1	Cecilie Johannessen	Norway	4:18.84	
28	2	8	Katarina Filova	Slovakia	4:21.14	
29	1	7	Samantha Arevalo	Ecuador	4:21.84	NR
30	3	8	Alexia Benitez	El Salvador	4:22.59	
31	1	5	Daniela Miyahara	Peru	4:23.33	
32	5	8	Kim Ga-Eul	South Korea	4:23.94	
33	1	4	Andrea Cedrón	Peru	4:25.06	
34	2	1	Shahd Osman	Egypt	4:26.35	
35	2	7	Benjaporn Sriphanomthorn	Thailand	4:29.65	
36	1	6	Victoria Chentsova	Northern Mariana Islands	5:18.67	
37	1	2	Jennet Saryyeva	Turkmenistan	5:41.09	
	1	3	Victoria Ho	Jamaica	DNS	

=== Final ===
The final was held at 18:50.

Rank	Lane	Name	Nationality	Time	Notes
1st place, gold medalist(s)	4	Federica Pellegrini	Italy	4:01.97	
2nd place, silver medalist(s)	1	Rebecca Adlington	Great Britain	4:04.01	
3rd place, bronze medalist(s)	5	Camille Muffat	France	4:04.06	
4	2	Kylie Palmer	Australia	4:04.62	
5	6	Lotte Friis	Denmark	4:04.68	NR
6	3	Lauren Boyle	New Zealand	4:06.11	
7	8	Katie Hoff	United States	4:08.22	
8	7	Melania Costa Schmid	Spain	4:09.66	
