= South Africa at the 2011 World Aquatics Championships =

- Flag of South Africa
- FINA code: RSA
- National federation: Swimming South Africa
- Website: www.swimsa.co.za

in Shanghai, China
- Competitors: 67 in 4 sports
- Medals Ranked 25th: Gold 0 Silver 0 Bronze 3 Total 3

World Aquatics Championships appearances
- 1973; 1975; 1978; 1982; 1986; 1991; 1994; 1998; 2001; 2003; 2005; 2007; 2009; 2011; 2013; 2015; 2017; 2019; 2022; 2023; 2024

South Africa competed at the 2011 World Aquatics Championships in Shanghai, China between July 16 and 31, 2011.

== Medalists ==
Medal	Name	Sport	Event	Date
Bronze	Cameron van der Burgh	Swimming	Men's 100m Breaststroke	25 July
Bronze	Cameron van der Burgh	Swimming	Men's 50m Breaststroke	27 July
Bronze	Gerhard Zandberg	Swimming	Men's 50m Backstroke	31 July

== Open water swimming ==
Men

Athlete	Event	Final	
Athlete	Event	Time	Position
Danie Marais	Men's 5km	59:46.9	32
Troy Prinsloo	Men's 5km	56:37.3	21
Troy Prinsloo	Men's 10km	1:58:48.5	38
Chad Ho	Men's 10km	1:54:58.6	20

Women

Athlete	Event	Final	
Athlete	Event	Time	Position
Nicole Brits	Women's 5km	1:04:53.1	33
Jessica Roux	Women's 5km	1:07:46.2	38
Jessica Roux	Women's 10km	2:16:34.5	45
Natalie Du Toit	Women's 10km	2:08:27.1	39

Mixed

Athlete	Event	Final	
Athlete	Event	Time	Position
Natalie du Toit; Chad Ho; Troy Prinsloo	Team	DNS	

== Swimming ==
South Africa qualified 23 swimmers.

Men

Athlete	Event	Heats		Semifinals		Final	
Athlete	Event	Time	Rank	Time	Rank	Time	Rank
Gideon Louw	Men's 50m Freestyle	22.21	11 Q	22.02	6 Q	22.11	8
Gideon Louw	Men's 100m Freestyle	48.74	10 Q	48.96	15	did not advance	
Roland Schoeman	Men's 50m Freestyle	22.32	15 Q	22.42	16	did not advance	
Roland Schoeman	Men's 50m Butterfly	23.64	10 Q	23.48	9	did not advance	
Graeme Moore	Men's 100m Freestyle	48.65	9 Q	48.59	12	did not advance	
Jean Basson	Men's 200m Freestyle	1:48.95	25	did not advance			
Heerden Herman	Men's 400m Freestyle	3:49.55	16			did not advance	
Heerden Herman	Men's 800m Freestyle	8:01.79	18			did not advance	
Heerden Herman	Men's 1500m Freestyle	15:21.92	17			did not advance	
Mark Randall	Men's 800m Freestyle	8:02.45	20			did not advance	
Gerhard Zandberg	Men's 50m Backstroke	24.72	1 Q	24.91	3 Q	24.66	Bronze medal
Gerhard Zandberg	Men's 100m Backstroke	55.21	31	did not advance			
Charl Crous	Men's 100m Backstroke	55.14	30	did not advance			
Darren Murray	Men's 200m Backstroke	1:58.73	18	did not advance			
Cameron van der Burgh	Men's 50m Breaststroke	27.58	7 Q	26.90	1 Q	27.19	Bronze medal
Cameron van der Burgh	Men's 100m Breaststroke	1:00.39	10 Q	1:00.07	5 Q	59.49	Bronze medal
Neil Versfeld	Men's 100m Breaststroke	1:01.72	34	did not advance			
Neil Versfeld	Men's 200m Breaststroke	2:12.54	11 Q	2:12.32	16	did not advance	
Chad le Clos	Men's 100m Butterfly	52.54	13 Q	52.44	13	did not advance	
Chad le Clos	Men's 200m Butterfly	1:56.37	7 Q	1:55.56	7 Q	1:55.07	5
Sebastien Rousseau	Men's 200m Butterfly	1:57.15	17	did not advance			
Darian Townsend	Men's 200m IM	1:59.97	14 Q	1:59.49	9	did not advance	
Riaan Schoeman	Men's 400m IM	4:16.53	9			did not advance	
Graeme Moore; Darian Townsend; Gideon Louw; Leith Shankland	Men's 4 × 100 m Freestyle Relay	3:14.72	7 Q			3:13.38	6
Darian Townsend; Jean Basson; Jan Venter; Sebastien Rousseau	Men's 4 × 200 m Freestyle Relay	7:15.65	12			did not advance	
Charl Crous; Cameron van der Burgh; Chad le Clos; Graeme Moore	Men's 4 × 100 m Medley Relay	3:36.47	10			did not advance	

Women

Athlete	Event	Heats		Semifinals		Final	
Athlete	Event	Time	Rank	Time	Rank	Time	Rank
Karin Prinsloo	Women's 50m Freestyle	25.89	25	did not advance			
Karin Prinsloo	Women's 100m Freestyle	55.57	26	did not advance			
Karin Prinsloo	Women's 200m Freestyle	1:59.52	25	did not advance			
Karin Prinsloo	Women's 50m Backstroke	29.03	22	did not advance			
Karin Prinsloo	Women's 100m Backstroke	1:01.34	14 Q	1:01.54	16	did not advance	
Wendy Trott	Women's 400m Freestyle	4:10.57	18			did not advance	
Wendy Trott	Women's 800m Freestyle	8:28.75	8 Q			8:30.45	7
Wendy Trott	Women's 1500m Freestyle	16:05.63	5 Q			16:06.02	6
Leone Vorster	Women's 200m Backstroke	2:16.45	31	did not advance			
Suzaan van Biljon	Women's 50m Breaststroke	31.96	15 Q	31.97	14	did not advance	
Suzaan van Biljon	Women's 100m Breaststroke	1:09.64	25	did not advance			
Vanessa Mohr	Women's 50m Butterfly	26.69	15 Q	26.74	15	did not advance	
Vanessa Mohr	Women's 100m Butterfly	58.96	17	did not advance			
Katheryn Anne Meaklim	Women's 200m IM	2:15.15	18	did not advance			
Katheryn Anne Meaklim	Women's 400m IM	4:41.07	11			did not advance	
Karin Prinsloo; Suzaan van Biljon; Vanessa Mohr; Leone Vorster	Women's 4 × 100 m Medley Relay	4:04.97	15			did not advance	

== Synchronised swimming ==
South Africa has qualified 12 athletes in synchronised swimming.

Women

Athlete	Event	Preliminary		Final	
Athlete	Event	Points	Rank	Points	Rank
Laura Strugnell	Solo Technical Routine	61.800	33	did not advance	
Laura Strugnell	Solo Free Routine	62.690	31	did not advance	
Emma Manners-Wood; Nicola David	Duet Technical Routine	61.500	42	did not advance	
Emma Manners-Wood; Laura Strugnell	Duet Free Routine	63.900	42	did not advance	
Jessica Broughton; Shannon Crowder; Nicola David; Jessica Domiro; Jessica Hayes Hill; Lucy McCarthy; Kerry Norden; Kelly Sloley	Team Technical Routine	64.400	22	did not advance	
Jessica Broughton; Shannon Crowder; Jessica Domiro; Natasha Domiro; Jessica Hayes Hill; Lucy McCarthy; Kerry Norden; Kelly Sloley	Team Free Routine	60.290	24	did not advance	

Reserve

- Fatima Isaacs

== Water polo ==
=== Men ===
Team Roster

- Grant Duane Belcher
- Pat McCarthy
- Jared Wingate Pearse
- Wesley Bohata – Captain
- Bevan Manson
- Jason Ray Kyte
- Gavin John Kyte
- Ryan Mckay Bell
- Gareth Seth Samuel
- Donn Stewart
- Adam Kajee
- Nicholas Jon Molyneux
- Matthew Andrew Chris Kemp

==== Group D ====
Team	Pld	W	D	L	GF	GA	GD	Pts
Italy	3	3	0	0	32	12	+20	6
Germany	3	2	0	1	31	22	+9	4
United States	3	1	0	2	32	20	+12	2
South Africa	3	0	0	3	12	53	–41	0

July 18, 2011; 19:40	Report	Italy	17–1	South Africa	Shanghai Oriental Sports Center, Shanghai; Attendance: 450; Referees: Balfanvayev (KAZ), Menedez (CUB)
July 18, 2011; 19:40	Report	Score by quarters: 5–0, 3–0, 5–0, 4–1			Shanghai Oriental Sports Center, Shanghai; Attendance: 450; Referees: Balfanvayev (KAZ), Menedez (CUB)
July 18, 2011; 19:40	Report	Deserti 4	Goals	Kyte 1	Shanghai Oriental Sports Center, Shanghai; Attendance: 450; Referees: Balfanvayev (KAZ), Menedez (CUB)

July 20, 2011; 13:30	Report	South Africa	8–16	Germany	Shanghai Oriental Sports Center, Shanghai; Attendance: 500; Referees: Ciric (SRB), Alexandrescu (ROU)
July 20, 2011; 13:30	Report	Score by quarters: 2–3, 2–4, 1–4, 3–5			Shanghai Oriental Sports Center, Shanghai; Attendance: 500; Referees: Ciric (SRB), Alexandrescu (ROU)
July 20, 2011; 13:30	Report	Kyte, Bell 3	Goals	Oeler 6	Shanghai Oriental Sports Center, Shanghai; Attendance: 500; Referees: Ciric (SRB), Alexandrescu (ROU)

July 22, 2011; 12:10	Report	United States	20–3	South Africa	Shanghai Oriental Sports Center, Shanghai; Attendance: 450; Referees: Reemnet (NED), Menendez (CUB)
July 22, 2011; 12:10	Report	Score by quarters: 5–0, 4–1, 5–0, 6–2			Shanghai Oriental Sports Center, Shanghai; Attendance: 450; Referees: Reemnet (NED), Menendez (CUB)
July 22, 2011; 12:10	Report	Azevedo 5	Goals	three players 1	Shanghai Oriental Sports Center, Shanghai; Attendance: 450; Referees: Reemnet (NED), Menendez (CUB)

==== Classification 13–16 ====
July 24, 2011; 10:50	Report	Brazil	7–4	South Africa	Shanghai Oriental Sports Center, Shanghai; Attendance: 700; Referees: Juhaz (HUN), Rustamova (UZB)
July 24, 2011; 10:50	Report	Score by quarters: 4–0, 0–1, 1–2, 2–1			Shanghai Oriental Sports Center, Shanghai; Attendance: 700; Referees: Juhaz (HUN), Rustamova (UZB)
July 24, 2011; 10:50	Report	Franco 2	Goals	Manson 2	Shanghai Oriental Sports Center, Shanghai; Attendance: 700; Referees: Juhaz (HUN), Rustamova (UZB)

==== Fifteenth place game ====
July 26, 2011; 08:40	Report	China	9–4	South Africa	Shanghai Oriental Sports Center, Shanghai; Attendance: 250; Referees: Menendez (CUB), Cabral (BRA)
July 26, 2011; 08:40	Report	Score by quarters: 3–1, 2–2, 2–0, 2–1			Shanghai Oriental Sports Center, Shanghai; Attendance: 250; Referees: Menendez (CUB), Cabral (BRA)
July 26, 2011; 08:40	Report	Yu Lijun, Li Bin 2	Goals	Bell 2	Shanghai Oriental Sports Center, Shanghai; Attendance: 250; Referees: Menendez (CUB), Cabral (BRA)

=== Women ===
Team Roster

- Leigh Maarschalk
- Kimberly Patricia Schmidt
- Kimberly Kay
- Shelley Kirsty Faulmann
- Megan Catherine Schooling
- Laura Marie Barrett
- Christine Joan Barretto
- Lee Anne Keet
- Delaine Monique Christian
- Sarah Lee Harris
- Nicolette Poulos – Captain
- Kelsey White
- Jemma Dendy Young

==== Group D ====
Team	Pld	W	D	L	GF	GA	GD	Pts
Italy	3	3	0	0	40	15	+25	6
China	3	2	0	1	50	21	+29	4
Cuba	3	0	1	2	19	40	−21	1
South Africa	3	0	1	2	16	49	−33	1

July 17, 2011; 19:00	Report	South Africa	5–22	China	Shanghai Oriental Sports Center, Shanghai; Attendance: 450; Referees: Deslieres (CAN); Makita (JPN)
July 17, 2011; 19:00	Report	Score by quarters: 1–5, 0–6, 2–5, 2–6			Shanghai Oriental Sports Center, Shanghai; Attendance: 450; Referees: Deslieres (CAN); Makita (JPN)
July 17, 2011; 19:00	Report	White, Dendy Young 2	Goals	Ma Huanhuan 6	Shanghai Oriental Sports Center, Shanghai; Attendance: 450; Referees: Deslieres (CAN); Makita (JPN)

July 19, 2011; 17:00	Report	Italy	18–2	South Africa	Shanghai Oriental Sports Center, Shanghai; Attendance: 400; Referees: Peris (CRO), Rustamova (UZB)
July 19, 2011; 17:00	Report	Score by quarters: 4–2, 5–0, 5–0, 4–0			Shanghai Oriental Sports Center, Shanghai; Attendance: 400; Referees: Peris (CRO), Rustamova (UZB)
July 19, 2011; 17:00	Report	Casanova 4	Goals	Schooling, Harris 1	Shanghai Oriental Sports Center, Shanghai; Attendance: 400; Referees: Peris (CRO), Rustamova (UZB)

July 21, 2011; 12:10	Report	South Africa	9–9	Cuba	Shanghai Oriental Sports Center, Shanghai; Attendance: 250; Referees: Reemnet (NED), Makita (JPN)
July 21, 2011; 12:10	Report	Score by quarters: 3–3, 1–1, 1–1, 4–4			Shanghai Oriental Sports Center, Shanghai; Attendance: 250; Referees: Reemnet (NED), Makita (JPN)
July 21, 2011; 12:10	Report	Harris 5	Goals	Bravo Curro, Hernandez Consuegra 3	Shanghai Oriental Sports Center, Shanghai; Attendance: 250; Referees: Reemnet (NED), Makita (JPN)

==== Classification 13–16 ====
July 23, 2011; 10:50	Report	Brazil	10–9	South Africa	Shanghai Oriental Sports Center, Shanghai; Attendance: 550; Referees: Alexandrescu (ROU), Wengenroth (SUI)
July 23, 2011; 10:50	Report	Score by quarters: 3–2, 3–1, 2–2, 2–4			Shanghai Oriental Sports Center, Shanghai; Attendance: 550; Referees: Alexandrescu (ROU), Wengenroth (SUI)
July 23, 2011; 10:50	Report	Canetti, Carvalho 2	Goals	Harris 4	Shanghai Oriental Sports Center, Shanghai; Attendance: 550; Referees: Alexandrescu (ROU), Wengenroth (SUI)

==== Fifteenth place game ====
July 25, 2011; 8:40	Report	Uzbekistan	5–6	South Africa	Shanghai Oriental Sports Center, Shanghai; Attendance: 200; Referees: Gonzalez (PUR), Menendez (CUB)
July 25, 2011; 8:40	Report	Score by quarters: 0–1, 2–2, 2–1, 1–2			Shanghai Oriental Sports Center, Shanghai; Attendance: 200; Referees: Gonzalez (PUR), Menendez (CUB)
July 25, 2011; 8:40	Report	five players 1	Goals	Kay, Harris 2	Shanghai Oriental Sports Center, Shanghai; Attendance: 200; Referees: Gonzalez (PUR), Menendez (CUB)
