= Open water swimming at the 2011 World Aquatics Championships – Men's 5 km =

Men's 5 km at the Open water swimming at the 2011 World Aquatics Championships
- Dates: 22 July

The men's 5 km competition of the open water swimming events at the 2011 World Aquatics Championships was held on July 22.

== Medalists ==
Gold	Silver	Bronze
Thomas Lurz (GER)	Spyridon Gianniotis (GRE)	Evgeny Drattsev (RUS)

== Results ==
The final was held on July 22.

Rank	Swimmer	Nationality	Time
1st place, gold medalist(s)	Thomas Lurz	Germany	56:16.6
2nd place, silver medalist(s)	Spyridon Gianniotis	Greece	56:17.4
3rd place, bronze medalist(s)	Evgeny Drattsev	Russia	56:18.5
4	Nicola Bolzonello	Italy	56:24.3
5	Andrew Gemmell	United States	56:24.8
6	Sergey Bolshakov	Russia	56:26.0
7	Damien Cattin Vidal	France	56:27.4
8	Chris Bryan	Ireland	56:28.0
9	Simone Ruffini	Italy	56:29.0
10	Csaba Gercsák	Hungary	56:30.1
11	Sean Ryan	United States	56:30.1
12	Yasunari Hirai	Japan	56:30.6
13	Hector Ruiz Perez	Spain	56:31.5
14	Igor Snitko	Ukraine	56:31.6
15	Xu Wenchao	China	56:32.2
16	Trent Grimsey	Australia	56:33.4
17	Richard Weinberger	Canada	56:33.7
18	Yuval Safra	Israel	56:34.2
19	Ivan Enderica	Ecuador	56:35.3
20	Jan Posmourny	Czech Republic	56:35.9
21	Troy Prinsloo	South Africa	56:37.3
22	Victor Colonese	Brazil	56:39.7
23	Jan Wolfgarten	Germany	56:40.2
24	Codie Grimsey	Australia	56:40.4
25	Luis Ricardo Escobar Torres	Mexico	56:42.9
26	Sebastien Frayesse	France	56:45.6
27	Kane Radford	New Zealand	56:45.7
28	Johndry Segovia	Venezuela	56:45.9
29	Antonios Fokaidis	Greece	56:46.0
30	Igor Chervynskiy	Ukraine	58:28.5
31	Aimeson King	Canada	59:09.3
32	Danie Marais	South Africa	59:46.9
33	Santiago Enderica	Ecuador	59:52.0
34	Alvaro Trewhela	Chile	1:00:17.1
35	David Carrillo	Venezuela	1:00:19.8
36	Samuel de Bona	Brazil	1:01:20.9
37	Yao Han	China	1:02:03.6
38	Ricky Anggawijaya	Indonesia	1:02:06.2
39	Yuen Marcus Yat Ho	Hong Kong	1:02:09.2
40	Kevin Vasquez	Guatemala	1:02:13.1
41	Khalid Al-Kulaibi	Oman	1:02:14.8
42	Aiman Al-Qasmi	Oman	1:02:28.7
43	Bekshe Zhumagali	Kazakhstan	1:02:31.9
44	Ling Tin Yu	Hong Kong	1:04:14.7
45	Islam Mohsen	Egypt	1:06:21.6
46	Rodolfo Sanchez	Costa Rica	1:08:16.4
47	Heimanu Sichan	French Polynesia	1:08:55.6
48	Satrio Bagaskara Gunadi Putra	Indonesia	1:09:46.9
49	Jeffry Villalobos	Costa Rica	1:10:06.1
50	Hayden Vickers	Cook Islands	1:11:02.1
–	Jackson Niyomugabo	Rwanda	OTL
–	Patrick Rukundo	Rwanda	OTL
–	Sergey Fesenko	Azerbaijan	DNS
–	Mazen Mohamed Aziz	Egypt	DSQ
