= Swimming at the 2011 World Aquatics Championships – Women's 400 metre individual medley =

Women's 400 metre individual medley at the 2011 World Aquatics Championships
- Dates: July 31, 2011 (heats and final)
- Competitors: 37 from 30 nations
- Winning time: 4:31.78

Medalists
gold medal	Elizabeth Beisel	United States
silver medal	Hannah Miley	Great Britain
bronze medal	Stephanie Rice	Australia

The women's 400 metre individual medley competition of the swimming events at the 2011 World Aquatics Championships was held on July 31 with the heats the final.

== Records ==
Prior to the competition, the existing world and championship records were as follows.

	Name	Nation	Time	Location	Date
World record	Stephanie Rice	Australia	4:29.45	Beijing	August 10, 2008
Championship record	Katinka Hosszú	Hungary	4:30.31	Rome	August 2, 2009

== Results ==
=== Heats ===
36 swimmers participated in 5 heats.

Rank	Heat	Lane	Name	Nationality	Time	Notes
1	3	4	Elizabeth Beisel	United States	4:34.95	Q
2	4	5	Mireia Belmonte García	Spain	4:36.36	Q
3	3	5	Caitlin Leverenz	United States	4:36.78	Q
4	5	8	Barbora Závadová	Czech Republic	4:36.96	Q, NR
5	5	2	Stephanie Rice	Australia	4:37.32	Q
6	5	4	Hannah Miley	Great Britain	4:37.39	Q
7	5	3	Li Xuanxu	China	4:37.61	Q
8	4	4	Ye Shiwen	China	4:38.18	Q
9	4	7	Alexa Komarnycky	Canada	4:38.82	
10	5	6	Zsuzsanna Jakabos	Hungary	4:38.84	
11	3	1	Kathryn Meaklim	South Africa	4:41.07	
12	4	6	Anja Klinar	Slovenia	4:41.23	
13	4	8	Jördis Steinegger	Austria	4:41.33	NR
14	4	3	Kirsty Coventry	Zimbabwe	4:42.52	
15	5	5	Katinka Hosszú	Hungary	4:42.96	
16	5	1	Stina Gardell	Sweden	4:44.53	
17	3	8	Stephanie Horner	Canada	4:44.85	
18	4	1	Alessia Polieri	Italy	4:45.26	
19	3	3	Samantha Hamill	Australia	4:45.32	
20	5	7	Yana Martynova	Russia	4:45.53	
21	3	6	Lara Grangeon	France	4:47.41	
22	2	4	Georgina Bardach	Argentina	4:48.09	
23	2	5	Ganna Dzerkal	Ukraine	4:48.17	
24	3	2	Stephanie Proud	Great Britain	4:48.31	
25	4	2	Stefania Pirozzi	Italy	4:48.40	
26	2	2	Kim Hye-Rim	South Korea	4:48.97	
27	2	6	Charetzeni Escobar	Mexico	4:49.95	=NR
28	2	7	Nadia Vieira	Portugal	4:51.65	
29	2	1	Sarra Lajnef	Tunisia	4:51.89	
30	2	3	Marina Ribi	Switzerland	4:52.49	
31	2	8	Samantha Arevalo	Ecuador	4:58.87	
32	1	4	Natthanan Junkrajang	Thailand	5:03.07	
33	1	5	Maria Coy	Guatemala	5:11.28	
34	1	3	Ana Maria Castellanos	Honduras	5:16.41	
35	1	6	Daniella van den Berg	Aruba	5:18.27	
36	1	2	Anum Bandey	Pakistan	5:37.11	NR
–	3	7	Gráinne Murphy	Ireland		DNS

=== Final ===
The final was held at 19:19.

Rank	Lane	Name	Nationality	Time	Notes
1st place, gold medalist(s)	4	Elizabeth Beisel	United States	4:31.78	
2nd place, silver medalist(s)	7	Hannah Miley	Great Britain	4:34.22	
3rd place, bronze medalist(s)	2	Stephanie Rice	Australia	4:34.23	
4	5	Mireia Belmonte García	Spain	4:34.94	
5	8	Ye Shiwen	China	4:35.15	
6	1	Li Xuanxu	China	4:35.78	
7	6	Barbora Závadová	Czech Republic	4:38.04	
8	3	Caitlin Leverenz	United States	4:38.80	
