= Ecuador at the 2011 World Aquatics Championships =

- Flag of Ecuador
- FINA code: ECU
- National federation: Federación Ecuatoriana de Natación
- Website: www.fena-ecuador.org

in Shanghai, China
- Competitors: 6 in 2 sports
- Medals: Gold 0 Silver 0 Bronze 0 Total 0

World Aquatics Championships appearances
- 1973; 1975; 1978; 1982; 1986; 1991; 1994; 1998; 2001; 2003; 2005; 2007; 2009; 2011; 2013; 2015; 2017; 2019; 2022; 2023; 2024

Ecuador competed at the 2011 World Aquatics Championships in Shanghai, China between July 16 and 31, 2011.

== Open water swimming ==
Men

Athlete	Event	Final	
Athlete	Event	Time	Position
Ivan Enderica	Men's 5km	56:35.3	19
Ivan Enderica	Men's 10km	1:55:51.9	31
Santiago Enderica	Men's 5km	59:52.0	33
Santiago Enderica	Men's 10km	DNF	

Women

Athlete	Event	Final	
Athlete	Event	Time	Position
Katia Barros	Women's 5km	1:02:19.7	30
Katia Barros	Women's 10km	2:16:45.7	46
Nataly Caldas	Women's 5km	1:04:40.7	32
Nataly Caldas	Women's 10km	2:07:04.9	34

== Swimming ==
Ecuador qualified 2 swimmers.

Men

Athlete	Event	Heats		Semifinals		Final	
Athlete	Event	Time	Rank	Time	Rank	Time	Rank
Esteban Enderica	Men's 800m Freestyle	8:17.22	38			did not advance	
Esteban Enderica	Men's 1500m Freestyle	15:56.30	25			did not advance	

Women

Athlete	Event	Heats		Semifinals		Final	
Athlete	Event	Time	Rank	Time	Rank	Time	Rank
Samantha Arevalo	Women's 400m Freestyle	4:21.84	29			did not advance	
Samantha Arevalo	Women's 800m Freestyle	9:00.96	28			did not advance	
Samantha Arevalo	Women's 200m IM	2:22.39	33	did not advance			
Samantha Arevalo	Women's 400m IM	4:58.87	31			did not advance	
