= Poland at the 2011 World Aquatics Championships =

Sporting event delegation

Flag of Poland

Poland competed at the 2011 World Aquatics Championships in Shanghai, China between July 16 and 31, 2011.

== Medalists ==
Medal	Name	Sport	Event	Date
Silver	Konrad Czerniak	Swimming	Men's 100m Butterfly	30 July

== Diving ==
Poland has qualified 1 athlete in diving.

Men

Athlete	Event	Preliminary		Semifinals		Final	
Athlete	Event	Points	Rank	Points	Rank	Points	Rank
Andrzej Rzeszutek	Men's 1m Springboard	369.60	10 Q			368.95	8
Andrzej Rzeszutek	Men's 3m Springboard	359.75	35	did not advance			

== Swimming ==
Men (9): Paweł Korzeniowski, Sławomir Kuczko, Radosław Kawęcki, Konrad Czerniak, Marcin Tarczyński, Mateusz Sawrymowicz, Filip Wypych, Dawid Szulich, Marcin Cieślak

Women (3): Otylia Jędrzejczak, Mirela Olczak, Alicja Tchórz

Men

Athlete	Event	Heats		Semifinals		Final	
Athlete	Event	Time	Rank	Time	Rank	Time	Rank
Filip Wypych	Men's 50m freestyle	22.99	36	did not advance			
Konrad Czerniak	Men's 100m Freestyle	48.92	15 Q	48.48	9	did not advance	
Konrad Czerniak	Men's 50m Butterfly	23.52	7 Q	23.48 NR	9	did not advance	
Konrad Czerniak	Men's 100m Butterfly	52.10	6 Q	51.54	2 Q	51.15 NR	Silver medal
Mateusz Sawrymowicz	Men's 400m Freestyle	3:56.22	31			did not advance	
Mateusz Sawrymowicz	Men's 1500m Freestyle	15:02.56	9			did not advance	
Radosław Kawęcki	Men's 100m Backstroke	55.01	28	did not advance			
Radosław Kawęcki	Men's 200m Backstroke	1:57.97	8 Q	1:57.15	5 Q	1:57.33	5
Marcin Tarczyński	Men's 100m Backstroke	55.28	33	did not advance			
Marcin Tarczyński	Men's 200m IM	2:01.14	23	did not advance			
Dawid Szulich	Men's 50m Breaststroke	28.34	28	did not advance			
Dawid Szulich	Men's 100m Breaststroke	1:02.24	43	did not advance			
Sławomir Kuczko	Men's 200m Breaststroke	2:13.75	24	did not advance			
Paweł Korzeniowski	Men's 100m Butterfly	52.57	16 Q	52.54	14	did not advance	
Paweł Korzeniowski	Men's 200m Butterfly	1:56.51	9 Q	1:55.85	8 Q	1:55.39	6
Marcin Cieślak	Men's 200m Butterfly	1:56.56	10 Q	1:56.13	11	did not advance	
Marcin Cieślak	Men's 200m IM	1:59.77	12 Q	2:01.65	16	did not advance	
Marcin Tarczyński; Dawid Szulich; Paweł Korzeniowski; Konrad Czerniak; Radosław Kawęcki*	Men's 4 × 100 m Medley Relay	3:36.13	7 Q			3:37.44	8

- * raced in heats only

Women

Athlete	Event	Heats		Semifinals		Final	
Athlete	Event	Time	Rank	Time	Rank	Time	Rank
Alicja Tchorz	Women's 50m Backstroke	29.50	34	did not advance			
Alicja Tchorz	Women's 100m Backstroke	1:02.04	25	did not advance			
Alicja Tchorz	Women's 200m Backstroke	2:14.27	26	did not advance			
Otylia Jędrzejczak	Women's 100m Butterfly	59.00	19	did not advance			
Otylia Jędrzejczak	Women's 200m Butterfly	2:09.01	13 Q	2:09.27	14	did not advance	
Mirela Olczak	Women's 200m Butterfly	2:10.69	21	did not advance			
