= Italy at the 2011 World Aquatics Championships =

Sporting event delegation

Flag of Italy

Italy competed at the 2011 World Aquatics Championships in Shanghai, China between July 16 and 31, 2011.

== Medalists ==
Medal	Name	Sport	Event	Date
Gold	Federica Pellegrini	Swimming	Women's 400m Freestyle	24 July
Gold	Federica Pellegrini	Swimming	Women's 200m Freestyle	27 July
Gold	Stefano Tempesti; Amaurys Perez; Niccolo Gitto; Pietro Figlioli; Alex Giorgetti; Maurizio Felugo; Niccolo Figari; Valentino Gallo; Christian Presciutti; Deni Fiorentini; Matteo Aicardi; Arnaldo Deserti; Giacomo Pastorino	Water Polo	Men's Tournament	30 July
Silver	Martina Grimaldi	Open Water Swimming	Women's 10km	19 July
Silver	Fabio Scozzoli	Swimming	Men's 100m Breaststroke	25 July
Silver	Fabio Scozzoli	Swimming	Men's 50m Breaststroke	27 July
Silver	Luca Dotto	Swimming	Men's 50m Freestyle	30 July
Bronze	Tania Cagnotto	Diving	Women's 1m Springboard	19 July
Bronze	Alice Franco	Open Water Swimming	Women's 25km	23 July

== Diving ==
Italy has qualified 9 athletes in diving.

Men

Athlete	Event	Preliminary		Semifinals		Final	
Athlete	Event	Points	Rank	Points	Rank	Points	Rank
Tommaso Rinaldi	Men's 1m Springboard	332.65	23			did not advance	
Michele Benedetti	Men's 3m Springboard	384.60	26	did not advance			
Tommaso Marconi	Men's 3m Springboard	391.05	20	did not advance			
Francesco Dell Uomo	Men's 10m Platform	355.40	27	did not advance			
Maicol Verzotto	Men's 10m Platform	342.15	28	did not advance			
Michele Benedetti; Tommaso Rinaldi	Men's 3m Synchro Springboard	372.36	9 Q			381.63	10 Q
Francesco Dell Uomo; Maicol Verzotto	Men's 10m Synchro Platform	361.86	13			did not advance	

Women

Athlete	Event	Preliminary		Semifinals		Final	
Athlete	Event	Points	Rank	Points	Rank	Points	Rank
Maria Elisabetta Marconi	Women's 1m Springboard	264.25	6 Q			290.15	4
Tania Cagnotto	Women's 1m Springboard	253.15	12 Q			295.45	Bronze medal
Tania Cagnotto	Women's 3m Springboard	298.50	13 Q	299.70	12 Q	313.45	9
Francesca Dallape	Women's 3m Springboard	293.50	16 Q	275.00	18	did not advance	
Noemi Batki	Women's 10m Platform	251.35	26	did not advance			
Tania Cagnotto; Francesca Dallape	Women's 3m Synchro Springboard	288.30	3 Q			297.60	6

== Open water swimming ==
Men

Athlete	Event	Final	
Athlete	Event	Time	Position
Nicola Bolzonello	Men's 5km	56:24.3	4
Simone Ruffini	Men's 5km	56:20.0	9
Luca Ferretti	Men's 10km	1:55:45.2	28
Valerio Cleri	Men's 10km	1:54:41.2	11
Valerio Cleri	Men's 25km	DNF	
Edoardo Stochino	Men's 25km	DNF	

Women

Athlete	Event	Final	
Athlete	Event	Time	Position
Rachele Bruni	Women's 5km	1:00:42.2	4
Alice Franco	Women's 5km	1:00:50.7	14
Alice Franco	Women's 25km	5:29:30.8	Bronze medal
Giorgia Consiglio	Women's 10km	DNF	
Martina Grimaldi	Women's 10km	2:01:59.9	Silver medal
Martina Grimaldi	Women's 25km	5:29:36.2	5

Mixed

Athlete	Event	Final	
Athlete	Event	Time	Position
Nicola Bolzonello; Rachele Bruni; Luca Ferretti	Team	58:00.5	4

== Swimming ==
Italy qualified 26 swimmers.

Men

Athlete	Event	Heats		Semifinals		Final	
Athlete	Event	Time	Rank	Time	Rank	Time	Rank
Marco Orsi	Men's 50m Freestyle	22.16	8 Q	22.13	11	did not advance	
Luca Dotto	Men's 50m Freestyle	22.25	12 Q	21.97	4 Q	21.90	Silver medal
Luca Dotto	Men's 100m Freestyle	48.79	13 Q	48.44	7 Q	48.24	7
Filippo Magnini	Men's 100m Freestyle	48.36	3 Q	48.50	11	did not advance	
Gianluca Maglia	Men's 200m Freestyle	1:48.54	18	did not advance			
Marco Belotti	Men's 200m Freestyle	1:48.66	20	did not advance			
Marco Belotti	Men's 50m Butterfly	24.19	23	did not advance			
Samuel Pizzetti	Men's 400m Freestyle	3:47.12	9			did not advance	
Samuel Pizzetti	Men's 800m Freestyle	7:51.59	9			did not advance	
Samuel Pizzetti	Men's 1500m Freestyle	14:58.30	8 Q			15:15.81	7
Federico Colbertaldo	Men's 800m Freestyle	8:01.10	17			did not advance	
Gregorio Paltrinieri	Men's 1500m Freestyle	15:22.03	19			did not advance	
Mirco de Tora	Men's 50m Backstroke	25.28	12 Q	25.40	12	did not advance	
Mirco de Tora	Men's 100m Backstroke	54.47	19	did not advance			
Sebastiano Ranfagni	Men's 200m Backstroke	1:58.26	12 Q	1:57.96	6 Q	1:57.49	7
Mattia Pesce	Men's 100m Breaststroke	1:01.25	20	did not advance			
Mattia Pesce	Men's 200m Breaststroke	2:16.67	35	did not advance			
Fabio Scozzoli	Men's 50m Breaststroke	27.84	10 Q	27.37	4 Q	27.17	Silver medal
Fabio Scozzoli	Men's 100m Breaststroke	1:00.14	5 Q	59.83	3 Q	59.42	Silver medal
Lorenzo Benatti	Men's 100m Butterfly	53.38	29	did not advance			
Federico Turrini	Men's 200m IM	2:04.35	31	did not advance			
Federico Turrini	Men's 400m IM	4:19.50	19			did not advance	
Luca Martin	Men's 400m IM	4:19.48	18			did not advance	
Luca Dotto; Marco Orsi; Michele Santucci; Filippo Magnini	Men's 4 × 100 m Freestyle Relay	3:13.61	3 Q			3:12.39	4
Gianluca Maglia; Filippo Magnini; Marco Belotti; Samuel Pizzetti	Men's 4 × 200 m Freestyle Relay	7:12.18	5 Q			7:12.26	8
Mirco Di Tora; Fabio Scozzoli; Marco Belotti; Luca Dotto	Men's 4 × 100 m Medley Relay	3:36.74	11			did not advance	

Women

Athlete	Event	Heats		Semifinals		Final	
Athlete	Event	Time	Rank	Time	Rank	Time	Rank
Federica Pellegrini	Women's 100m Freestyle	DNS		did not advance			
Federica Pellegrini	Women's 200m Freestyle	1:56.87	2 Q	1:56.42	2 Q	1:55.58	Gold medal
Federica Pellegrini	Women's 400m Freestyle	4:04.76	1 Q			4:01.97	Gold medal
Federica Pellegrini	Women's 800m Freestyle	DNS				did not advance	
Martina Rita Caramignoli	Women's 1500m Freestyle	16:23.75	13			did not advance	
Elena Gemo	Women's 50m Backstroke	29.12	24	did not advance			
Elena Gemo	Women's 100m Backstroke	1:01.62	20	did not advance			
Elena Gemo	Women's 50m Butterfly	26.86	17	did not advance			
Chiara Boggiatto	Women's 100m Breaststroke	1:09.50	23	did not advance			
Chiara Boggiatto	Women's 200m Breaststroke	2:27.84	15 Q	2:28.14	16	did not advance	
Ilaria Bianchi	Women's 100m Butterfly	1:00.36	34	did not advance			
Alessia Polieri	Women's 200m Butterfly	2:13.65	27	did not advance			
Alessia Polieri	Women's 200m IM	2:18.69	27	did not advance			
Alessia Polieri	Women's 400m IM	4:45.26	18			did not advance	
Stefania Pirozzi	Women's 400m IM	4:48.40	25			did not advance	
Alice Mizzau; Federica Pellegrini; Alice Nesti; Renata Spagnolo	Women's 4 × 200 m Freestyle Relay	8:02.69	13			did not advance	
Elena Gemo; Chiara Boggiatto; Ilaria Bianchi; Federica Pellegrini	Women's 4 × 100 m Medley Relay	4:04.74	14			did not advance	

== Synchronised swimming ==
Italy has qualified 12 athletes in synchronised swimming.

Women

Athlete	Event	Preliminary		Final	
Athlete	Event	Points	Rank	Points	Rank
Linda Cerruti	Solo Technical Routine	88.400	9 Q	88.300	9
Linda Cerruti	Solo Free Routine	89.610	7 Q	89.950	7
Giulia Lapi; Mariangela Perrupato	Duet Technical Routine	89.900	7 Q	90.100	7
Giulia Lapi; Mariangela Perrupato	Duet Free Routine	90.860	7 Q	89.800	7
Elisa Bozzo; Beatrice Callegari; Camilla Cattaneo; Costanza Fiorentini; Manila Flamini; Mariangela Perrupato; Benedetta Re; Sara Sgarzi	Team Technical Routine	90.600	7 Q	90.700	7
Elisa Bozzo; Beatrice Callegari; Constanza Fiorentini; Manila Flamini; Giulia Lapi; Mariangela Perrupato; Benedetta Re; Sara Sgarzi	Team Free Routine	91.090	7 Q	90.870	7
Elisa Bozzo; Beatrice Callegari; Francesca Deidda; Costanza Fiorentini; Manila Flamini; Giulia Lapi; Mariangela Perrupato; Benedetta Re; Sara Sgarzi; Cristina Tempera	Free Routine Combination	90.650	6 Q	90.550	6

== Water polo ==
=== Men ===
Team Roster

- Stefano Tempesti – Captain
- Amaurys Perez
- Niccolo Gitto
- Pietro Figlioli
- Alex Giorgetti
- Maurizio Felugo
- Niccolo Figari
- Valentino Gallo
- Christian Presciutti
- Deni Fiorentini
- Matteo Aicardi
- Arnaldo Deserti
- Giacomo Pastorino

==== Group D ====
Team	Pld	W	D	L	GF	GA	GD	Pts
Italy	3	3	0	0	32	12	+20	6
Germany	3	2	0	1	31	22	+9	4
United States	3	1	0	2	32	20	+12	2
South Africa	3	0	0	3	12	53	–41	0

July 18, 2011; 19:40	Report	Italy	17–1	South Africa	Shanghai Oriental Sports Center, Shanghai; Attendance: 450; Referees: Balfanvayev (KAZ), Menedez (CUB)
July 18, 2011; 19:40	Report	Score by quarters: 5–0, 3–0, 5–0, 4–1			Shanghai Oriental Sports Center, Shanghai; Attendance: 450; Referees: Balfanvayev (KAZ), Menedez (CUB)
July 18, 2011; 19:40	Report	Deserti 4	Goals	Kyte 1	Shanghai Oriental Sports Center, Shanghai; Attendance: 450; Referees: Balfanvayev (KAZ), Menedez (CUB)

July 20, 2011; 17:00	Report	United States	5–8	Italy	Shanghai Oriental Sports Center, Shanghai; Attendance: 650; Referees: Margeta (SLO), Tulga (TUR)
July 20, 2011; 17:00	Report	Score by quarters: 1–2, 1–2, 1–3, 2–1			Shanghai Oriental Sports Center, Shanghai; Attendance: 650; Referees: Margeta (SLO), Tulga (TUR)
July 20, 2011; 17:00	Report	Alexander 2	Goals	Gitto, Felugo 2	Shanghai Oriental Sports Center, Shanghai; Attendance: 650; Referees: Margeta (SLO), Tulga (TUR)

July 22, 2011; 13:30	Report	Italy	7–6	Germany	Shanghai Oriental Sports Center, Shanghai; Attendance: 600; Referees: Borrell (ESP), Stavridis (GRE)
July 22, 2011; 13:30	Report	Score by quarters: 2–3, 1–2, 2–1, 2–0			Shanghai Oriental Sports Center, Shanghai; Attendance: 600; Referees: Borrell (ESP), Stavridis (GRE)
July 22, 2011; 13:30	Report	Aicardi 3	Goals	Real, Ploitze 2	Shanghai Oriental Sports Center, Shanghai; Attendance: 600; Referees: Borrell (ESP), Stavridis (GRE)

==== Quarterfinals ====
July 26, 2011; 21:00	Report	Italy	10–6	Spain	Shanghai Oriental Sports Center, Shanghai; Attendance: 650; Referees: Margeta (SLO), Naumov (RUS)
July 26, 2011; 21:00	Report	Score by quarters: 2–1, 3–3, 3–1, 2–1			Shanghai Oriental Sports Center, Shanghai; Attendance: 650; Referees: Margeta (SLO), Naumov (RUS)
July 26, 2011; 21:00	Report	Figlioli 4	Goals	six players 1	Shanghai Oriental Sports Center, Shanghai; Attendance: 650; Referees: Margeta (SLO), Naumov (RUS)

==== Semifinals ====
July 28, 2011; 21:00	Report	Croatia	8–9	Italy	Shanghai Oriental Sports Center, Shanghai; Attendance: 1,200; Referees: Borrell (ESP), Koganov (AZE)
July 28, 2011; 21:00	Report	Score by quarters: 0–1, 1–2, 3–5, 4–1			Shanghai Oriental Sports Center, Shanghai; Attendance: 1,200; Referees: Borrell (ESP), Koganov (AZE)
July 28, 2011; 21:00	Report	Bošković 3	Goals	Giorgetti 3	Shanghai Oriental Sports Center, Shanghai; Attendance: 1,200; Referees: Borrell (ESP), Koganov (AZE)

==== Gold medal game ====
July 30, 2011; 21:00	Report	Serbia	7–8 (OT)	Italy	Shanghai Oriental Sports Center, Shanghai; Attendance: 2,000; Referees: Tulga (TUR), Koganov (AZE)
July 30, 2011; 21:00	Report	Score by quarters: 0–1, 2–0, 1–4, 3–1 OT: 1–2			Shanghai Oriental Sports Center, Shanghai; Attendance: 2,000; Referees: Tulga (TUR), Koganov (AZE)
July 30, 2011; 21:00	Report	Filipović 3	Goals	Aicardi 3	Shanghai Oriental Sports Center, Shanghai; Attendance: 2,000; Referees: Tulga (TUR), Koganov (AZE)

=== Women ===
Team Roster

- Giulia Gorlero
- Simona Abbate
- Elisa Casanova – Captain
- Francesca Pomeri
- Martina Savioli
- Allegra Lapi
- Marta Colaiocco
- Roberta Bianconi
- Giulia Enrica Emmolo
- Giulia Rambaldi Guidasci
- Aleksandra Cotti
- Teresa Frassinetti
- Elena Gigli

==== Group D ====
Team	Pld	W	D	L	GF	GA	GD	Pts
Italy	3	3	0	0	40	15	+25	6
China	3	2	0	1	50	21	+29	4
Cuba	3	0	1	2	19	40	−21	1
South Africa	3	0	1	2	16	49	−33	1

July 17, 2011; 17:40	Report	Italy	12–4	Cuba	Shanghai Oriental Sports Center, Shanghai; Attendance: 300; Referees: Juhas (HUN); Wengenroth (SUI)
July 17, 2011; 17:40	Report	Score by quarters: 4–1, 2–1, 3–0, 3–2			Shanghai Oriental Sports Center, Shanghai; Attendance: 300; Referees: Juhas (HUN); Wengenroth (SUI)
July 17, 2011; 17:40	Report	three players 3	Goals	Hernendez Consuegra, Gutierrez More 2	Shanghai Oriental Sports Center, Shanghai; Attendance: 300; Referees: Juhas (HUN); Wengenroth (SUI)

July 19, 2011; 17:00	Report	Italy	18–2	South Africa	Shanghai Oriental Sports Center, Shanghai; Attendance: 400; Referees: Peris (CRO), Rustamova (UZB)
July 19, 2011; 17:00	Report	Score by quarters: 4–2, 5–0, 5–0, 4–0			Shanghai Oriental Sports Center, Shanghai; Attendance: 400; Referees: Peris (CRO), Rustamova (UZB)
July 19, 2011; 17:00	Report	Casanova 4	Goals	Schooling, Harris 1	Shanghai Oriental Sports Center, Shanghai; Attendance: 400; Referees: Peris (CRO), Rustamova (UZB)

July 21, 2011; 21:00	Report	Italy	10–9	China	Shanghai Oriental Sports Center, Shanghai; Attendance: 700; Referees: Koganov (AZE), Flahive (AUS)
July 21, 2011; 21:00	Report	Score by quarters: 4–2, 2–1, 3–3, 1–3			Shanghai Oriental Sports Center, Shanghai; Attendance: 700; Referees: Koganov (AZE), Flahive (AUS)
July 21, 2011; 21:00	Report	Bianconi 3	Goals	Wang Yi 3	Shanghai Oriental Sports Center, Shanghai; Attendance: 700; Referees: Koganov (AZE), Flahive (AUS)

==== Quarterfinals ====
July 25, 2011; 16:40	Report	Italy	14–12 (OT)	Australia	Shanghai Oriental Sports Center, Shanghai; Attendance: 550; Referees: Juhaz (HUN), Borrell (ESP)
July 25, 2011; 16:40	Report	Score by quarters: 0–1, 4–0, 4–6, 0–1 OT: 1–1 Pen 5–3			Shanghai Oriental Sports Center, Shanghai; Attendance: 550; Referees: Juhaz (HUN), Borrell (ESP)
July 25, 2011; 16:40	Report	Bianconi 4	Goals	four players 2	Shanghai Oriental Sports Center, Shanghai; Attendance: 550; Referees: Juhaz (HUN), Borrell (ESP)

==== Semifinals ====
July 27, 2011; 16:50	Report	Greece	14–11	Italy	Shanghai Oriental Sports Center, Shanghai; Attendance: 950; Referees: Tulga (TUR), Borrell (ESP)
July 27, 2011; 16:50	Report	Score by quarters: 3–2, 5–3, 3–3, 3–3			Shanghai Oriental Sports Center, Shanghai; Attendance: 950; Referees: Tulga (TUR), Borrell (ESP)
July 27, 2011; 16:50	Report	three players 3	Goals	Bianconi, Rambaldi Guidasci 3	Shanghai Oriental Sports Center, Shanghai; Attendance: 950; Referees: Tulga (TUR), Borrell (ESP)

==== Bronze medal game ====
July 29, 2011; 16:00	Report	Russia	8–7	Italy	Shanghai Oriental Sports Center, Shanghai; Attendance: 1,000; Referees: Juhaz (HUN), Rotsart (USA)
July 29, 2011; 16:00	Report	Score by quarters: 4–0, 2–1, 2–6, 0–0			Shanghai Oriental Sports Center, Shanghai; Attendance: 1,000; Referees: Juhaz (HUN), Rotsart (USA)
July 29, 2011; 16:00	Report	Belyaeva 3	Goals	Casanova, Bianconi 2	Shanghai Oriental Sports Center, Shanghai; Attendance: 1,000; Referees: Juhaz (HUN), Rotsart (USA)
