= Swimming at the 2011 World Aquatics Championships – Men's 1500 metre freestyle =

Men's 1500 metre freestyle at the 2011 World Aquatics Championships
- Dates: July 30, 2011 (heats); July 31, 2011 (final)
- Competitors: 27 from 23 nations
- Winning time: 14:34.14 WR

Medalists
gold medal	Sun Yang	China
silver medal	Ryan Cochrane	Canada
bronze medal	Gergő Kis	Hungary

The men's 1500 metre freestyle competition of the swimming events at the 2011 World Aquatics Championships was held on July 30 with the heats and the semifinals and July 31 with the final.

== Record ==
Prior to the competition, the existing world and championship record were as follows.

	Name	Nation	Time	Location	Date
World record Championship record	Grant Hackett	Australia	14:34.56	Fukuoka	July 29, 2001

The following record was established during the competition:

Date	Round	Name	Nation	Time	WR	CR
July 31, 2011	Final	Sun Yang	China	14:34.14	WR	CR

== Results ==
=== Heats ===
27 swimmers participated in 4 heats.

Rank	Heat	Lane	Name	Nationality	Time	Notes
1	4	4	Sun Yang	China	14:48.13	Q
2	2	3	Gergő Kis	Hungary	14:52.72	Q
3	2	6	Peter Vanderkaay	United States	14:54.99	Q
4	2	4	Chad La Tourette	United States	14:55.59	Q
5	3	4	Ryan Cochrane	Canada	14:55.86	Q
6	2	5	Pál Joensen	Faroe Islands	14:56.66	Q
7	4	3	Yohsuke Miyamoto	Japan	14:57.12	Q, NR
8	3	5	Samuel Pizzetti	Italy	14:58.30	Q
9	3	3	Mateusz Sawrymowicz	Poland	15:02.56	
10	3	2	Job Kienhuis	Netherlands	15:05.27	NR
11	4	5	Sebastien Rouault	France	15:05.88	
12	3	7	Dai Jun	China	15:09.15	
13	3	1	Mads Glæsner	Denmark	15:12.52	
14	4	7	Daniel Fogg	Great Britain	15:13.39	
15	4	6	Oussama Mellouli	Tunisia	15:13.56	
16	2	2	Sergiy Frolov	Ukraine	15:14.38	
17	3	6	Heerden Herman	South Africa	15:21.92	
17	4	8	Juan Martin Pereyra	Argentina	15:21.92	NR
19	4	2	Gregorio Paltrinieri	Italy	15:22.03	
20	4	1	Gergely Gyurta	Hungary	15:22.50	
21	2	7	Christian Kubusch	Germany	15:27.68	
22	1	4	Uladzimir Zhyharau	Belarus	15:36.23	
23	3	8	Ventsislav Aydarski	Bulgaria	15:46.33	
24	2	1	Jarrod Killey	Australia	15:51.66	
25	1	6	Esteban Enderica	Ecuador	15:56.30	
26	1	5	Iacovos Hadjiconstantinou	Cyprus	17:02.94	
27	1	3	Omar Núñez	Nicaragua	17:41.77	

=== Final ===
The final was held at 18:49.

Rank	Lane	Name	Nationality	Time	Notes
1st place, gold medalist(s)	4	Sun Yang	China	14:34.14	WR
2nd place, silver medalist(s)	2	Ryan Cochrane	Canada	14:44.46	
3rd place, bronze medalist(s)	5	Gergő Kis	Hungary	14:45.66	NR
4	7	Pál Joensen	Faroe Islands	14:46.33	NR
5	6	Chad La Tourette	United States	14:52.36	
6	3	Peter Vanderkaay	United States	15:00.47	
7	8	Samuel Pizzetti	Italy	15:15.81	
8	1	Yohsuke Miyamoto	Japan	15:20.67	
