= Slovenia at the 2011 World Aquatics Championships =

Sporting event delegation

Flag of Slovenia

Slovenia competed at the 2011 World Aquatics Championships in Shanghai, China, between 16 and 31 July 2011.

== Open water swimming ==
Men

| Athlete | Event | Final | |
| Athlete | Event | Time | Position |
|---|---|---|---|
| Rok Kerin | Men's 10 km | 2:01:04.7 | 42 |
| Rok Kerin | Men's 25 km | DNF | |

Women

| Athlete | Event | Final | |
| Athlete | Event | Time | Position |
|---|---|---|---|
| Teja Zupan | Women's 5 km | 1:00:52.6 | 15 |
| Teja Zupan | Women's 10 km | 2:02:24.7 | 14 |
| Nika Kozamernik | Women's 10 km | 2:07:32.7 | 37 |
| Nika Kozamernik | Women's 25 km | 6:00:43.8 | 17 |

== Swimming ==
Slovenia qualified 11 swimmers.

Men

| Athlete | Event | Heats | | Semifinals | | Final | |
| Athlete | Event | Time | Rank | Time | Rank | Time | Rank |
|---|---|---|---|---|---|---|---|
| Jan Karel Petric | Men's 800 m freestyle | 8:07.78 | 26 | | | did not advance | |
| Damir Dugonjič | Men's 50 m breaststroke | 27.47 | 3 Q | 27.51 | 5 Q | 28.00 | 8 |
| Damir Dugonjič | Men's 100 m breaststroke | 1:01.69 | 33 | did not advance | | | |
| Matjaž Markič | Men's 50 m breaststroke | 27.36 | 2 Q | 27.71 | 10 | did not advance | |
| Matjaž Markič | Men's 100 m breaststroke | 1:01.56 | 29 | did not advance | | | |
| Peter Mankoč | Men's 50 m butterfly | 24.01 | 19 | did not advance | | | |
| Peter Mankoč | Men's 100 m butterfly | 52.46 | 12 Q | 52.67 | 16 | did not advance | |
| Robert Zbogar | Men's 200 m butterfly | 1:57.71 | 21 | did not advance | | | |
| Peter Mankoč; Robert Zbogar; Jan Karel Petric; Matjaž Markič | Men's 4 x 100 m freestyle | 3:40.22 | 15 | | | did not advance | |

Women

| Athlete | Event | Heats | | Semifinals | | Final | |
| Athlete | Event | Time | Rank | Time | Rank | Time | Rank |
|---|---|---|---|---|---|---|---|
| Sara Isaković | Women's 100 m freestyle | 55.81 | 31 | did not advance | | | |
| Sara Isaković | Women's 200 m freestyle | 1:58.01 | 10 Q | 1:58.52 | 15 | did not advance | |
| Sara Isaković | Women's 100 m butterfly | 1:00.23 | 33 | did not advance | | | |
| Spela Bohinc | Women's 800 m freestyle | 8:45.86 | 23 | | | did not advance | |
| Maja Cesar | Women's 1500 m freestyle | 17:22.42 | 24 | | | did not advance | |
| Anja Čarman | Women's 100 m backstroke | 1:02.61 | 29 | did not advance | | | |
| Anja Čarman | Women's 200m Backstroke | 2:12.73 | 21 | did not advance | | | |
| Tanja Smid | Women's 100 m breaststroke | 1:12.12 | 33 | did not advance | | | |
| Tanja Smid | Women's 200 m breaststroke | 2:32.26 | 26 | did not advance | | | |
| Tanja Smid | Women's 200 m individual medley | 2:17.45 | 25 | did not advance | | | |
| Anja Klinar | Women's 200 m butterfly | 2:10.83 | 22 | did not advance | | | |
| Anja Klinar | Women's 400 m individual medley | 4:41.23 | 12 | | | did not advance | |
