= Indonesia at the 2011 World Aquatics Championships =

Sporting event delegation

Flag of Indonesia

Indonesia competed at the 2011 World Aquatics Championships in Shanghai, China between July 16 and 31, 2011.

== Diving ==
Indonesia has qualified 5 athletes in diving.

Men

Athlete	Event	Preliminary		Semifinals		Final	
Athlete	Event	Points	Rank	Points	Rank	Points	Rank
Luthfi Niko Abdillah	Men's 1m Springboard	236.20	38			did not advance	
Muhammad Nasrullah	Men's 10m Platform	327.60	30	did not advance			
Andriyan Andriyan; Luthfi Niko Abdillah	Men's 3m Synchro Springboard	286.98	18			did not advance	
Muhammad Nasrullah; Husaini Noor	Men's 10m Synchro Platform	304.80	17			did not advance	

Women

Athlete	Event	Preliminary		Semifinals		Final	
Athlete	Event	Points	Rank	Points	Rank	Points	Rank
Sari Ambarwati	Women's 1m Springboard	200.05	35			did not advance	
Sari Ambarwati	Women's 3m Springboard	184.65	39	did not advance			

== Open water swimming ==
Men

Athlete	Event	Final	
Athlete	Event	Time	Position
Satrio Putra	Men's 5km	1:09:46.9	48
Ricky Anggawijaya	Men's 5km	1:02:06.2	38
Ricky Anggawijaya	Men's 10km	2:13:47.4	59
Amoczy Pratama	Men's 10km	2:13:48.4	60

Women

Athlete	Event	Final	
Athlete	Event	Time	Position
Yessy Yosaputra	Women's 5km	1:04:56.1	35
Yessy Yosaputra	Women's 10km	2:20:43.2	50
Annisa Fabiola	Women's 5km	DNS	
Annisa Fabiola	Women's 10km	DNF	

== Swimming ==
Indonesia qualified 3 swimmers.

Men

Athlete	Event	Heats		Semifinals		Final	
Athlete	Event	Time	Rank	Time	Rank	Time	Rank
Indra Gunawan	Men's 50m Breaststroke	28.81	34	did not advance			
Indra Gunawan	Men's 100m Breaststroke	1:03.80	58	did not advance			
Indra Gunawan	Men's 200m Breaststroke	2:18.89	41	did not advance			
Donny Utomo	Men's 100m Butterfly	57.59	54	did not advance			
Donny Utomo	Men's 200m Butterfly	2:05.23	37	did not advance			

Women

Athlete	Event	Heats		Semifinals		Final	
Athlete	Event	Time	Rank	Time	Rank	Time	Rank
Tiffany Sudarma	Women's 100m Backstroke	1:05.19	44	did not advance			

== Synchronised swimming ==
Indonesia has qualified 12 athletes in synchronised swimming.

Women

Athlete	Event	Preliminary		Final	
Athlete	Event	Points	Rank	Points	Rank
Adela Amanda Nirmala	Solo Technical Routine	66.000	32	did not advance	
Samara Talia Pattiasina	Solo Free Routine	65.440	29	did not advance	
Megawati Suyanto; Samara Talia Pattiasina	Duet Technical Routine	62.800	41	did not advance	
Sabihisma Arsyi; Tri Eka Sandiri	Duet Free Routine	65.000	41	did not advance	
Kusumawardani Adhiati; Adela Amanda Nirmala; Shanika Andiarti; Sabihisma Arsyi; Tri Eka Sandiri; Megawati Suyanto; Samara Talia Pattiasina; Dea Vania Putri	Team Technical Routine	60.000	23	did not advance	
Kusumawardani Adhiati; Adela Amanda Nirmala; Shanika Andiarti; Sabihisma Arsyi; Sabrina Ayunda Kusuma; Tri Sandiri Eka; Megawati Suyanto; Samara Talia Pattiasina	Team Free Routine	63.050	21	did not advance	
Adela Amanda Nirmala; Shanika Andiarti; Sabihisma Arsyi; Sabrina Ayunda Kusuma; Sartika Dewi Rachmani; Tri Eka Sandiri; Megawati Suyanto; Samara Talia Pattiasina; Dea Vania Putri; Putri Yanindha Sari	Free Routine Combination	65.780	14	did not advance	

Reserve

- Sheila Nur Annisa
