= Czech Republic at the 2011 World Aquatics Championships =

Sporting event delegation

Flag of Czech Republic

Czech Republic competed at the 2011 World Aquatics Championships in Shanghai, China between July 16 and 31, 2011.

== Open water swimming ==
Men

Athlete	Event	Final	
Athlete	Event	Time	Position
Jan Pošmourný	Men's 5km	56:35.9	20
Jan Pošmourný	Men's 10km	1:56:50.2	32
Rostislav Vítek	Men's 10km	DNF	
Rostislav Vítek	Men's 25km	DNF	
Libor Smolka	Men's 25km	5:13:20.1	10

Women

Athlete	Event	Final	
Athlete	Event	Time	Position
Jana Pechanová	Women's 5km	1:00:47.4	10
Jana Pechanová	Women's 10km	2:02:13.8	7
Jana Pechanová	Women's 25km	DNF	
Silvie Rybářová	Women's 10km	2:05:30.5	29
Silvie Rybářová	Women's 25km	5:29:51.3	9

== Swimming ==
Czech Republic qualified 9 swimmers.

Men

Athlete	Event	Heats		Semifinals		Final	
Athlete	Event	Time	Rank	Time	Rank	Time	Rank
Martin Verner	Men's 100m Freestyle	49.52	28	did not advance			
Květoslav Svoboda	Men's 800m Freestyle	8:20.41	41			did not advance	
Petr Bartůněk	Men's 50m Breaststroke	27.86	12 Q	27.87	15	did not advance	
Petr Bartůněk	Men's 100m Breaststroke	1:01.75	35	did not advance			
Michal Rubáček	Men's 50m Butterfly	24.59	31	did not advance			
Jan Šefl	Men's 100m Butterfly	53.97	37	did not advance			
Jan Šefl	Men's 200m Butterfly	2:01.34	34	did not advance			
Jan Šefl; Michal Rubáček; Martin Verner; Květoslav Svoboda	Men's 4 x 200m Freestyle Relay	7:24.46	16			did not advance	

Women

Athlete	Event	Heats		Semifinals		Final	
Athlete	Event	Time	Rank	Time	Rank	Time	Rank
Simona Baumrtová	Women's 50m Backstroke	29.37	30	did not advance			
Simona Baumrtová	Women's 100m Backstroke	1:02.71	30	did not advance			
Simona Baumrtová	Women's 200m Backstroke	2:13.48	24	did not advance			
Petra Chocová	Women's 50m Breaststroke	31.41	12 Q	31.75	12	did not advance	
Petra Chocová	Women's 100m Breaststroke	1:08.58	15 Q	1:08.40	13	did not advance	
Martina Moravčíková	Women's 200m Breaststroke	2:31.46	25	did not advance			
Barbora Závadová	Women's 200m IM	2:14.08	14 Q	2:14.03	15	did not advance	
Barbora Závadová	Women's 400m IM	4:36.96	4 Q			4:38.04	7

== Synchronised swimming ==
Czech Republic has qualified 2 athletes in synchronised swimming.

Women

Athlete	Event	Preliminary		Final	
Athlete	Event	Points	Rank	Points	Rank
Soňa Bernardová	Solo Free Routine	85.630	12 Q	85.230	12
Soňa Bernardová; Alžběta Dufková	Duet Technical Routine	85.500	15	did not advance	
Soňa Bernardová; Alžběta Dufková	Duet Free Routine	86.480	13	did not advance	
