= Tahiti at the 2011 World Aquatics Championships =

- Flag of French Polynesia
- World Aquatics code: TAH
- National federation: Fédération Tahitienne de Natation
- Website: www.swimtahiti.com

in Shanghai, China
- Medals: Gold 0 Silver 0 Bronze 0 Total 0

World Aquatics Championships appearances
- 1973; 1975; 1978; 1982; 1986; 1991; 1994; 1998; 2001; 2003; 2005; 2007; 2009; 2011; 2013; 2015; 2017; 2019; 2022; 2023; 2024; 2025

Tahiti competed at the 2011 FINA World Championships in Shanghai, China, July 16–31, 2011.

== Open water swimming ==
Men

Athlete	Event	Final	
Athlete	Event	Time	Position
Heimanu Sichan	Men's 5km	1:08:55.6	47

== Swimming ==
French Polynesia qualified 3 swimmers.

Men

Athlete	Event	Heats		Semifinals		Final	
Athlete	Event	Time	Rank	Time	Rank	Time	Rank
Anthony Clark	Men's 50m Freestyle	24.15	49	did not advance			
Anthony Clark	Men's 100m Freestyle	54.51	72	did not advance			
Heimanu Sichan	Men's 400m Freestyle	4:21.24	46			did not advance	
Heimanu Sichan	Men's 800m Freestyle	9:00.87	51			did not advance	

Women

Athlete	Event	Heats		Semifinals		Final	
Athlete	Event	Time	Rank	Time	Rank	Time	Rank
Kukeilani Snow	Women's 100m Freestyle	1:05.99	66	did not advance			
Kukeilani Snow	Women's 50m Butterfly	32.27	44	did not advance			
