= Guatemala at the 2011 World Aquatics Championships =

Sporting event delegation

Flag of Guatemala

Guatemala competed at the 2011 World Aquatics Championships in Shanghai, China between July 16 and 31, 2011.

== Open water swimming ==
Men

Athlete	Event	Final	
Athlete	Event	Time	Position
Kevin Vasquez	Men's 5km	1:02:13.1	40
Kevin Vasquez	Men's 10km	2:13:19.2	58

Women

Athlete	Event	Final	
Athlete	Event	Time	Position
Cindy Toscano	Women's 5km	1:05:04.1	36
Cindy Toscano	Women's 10km	2:19:43.1	48

== Swimming ==
Guatemala qualified 2 swimmers.

Men

Athlete	Event	Heats		Semifinals		Final	
Athlete	Event	Time	Rank	Time	Rank	Time	Rank
Kevin Avila	Men's 50m Freestyle	24.66	59	did not advance			
Kevin Avila	Men's 100m Freestyle	53.03	61	did not advance			

Women

Athlete	Event	Heats		Semifinals		Final	
Athlete	Event	Time	Rank	Time	Rank	Time	Rank
Maria Coy	Women's 200m Breaststroke	2:45.32	33	did not advance			
Maria Coy	Women's 400m IM	5:11.28	33			did not advance	
