= South Korea at the 2011 World Aquatics Championships =

Sporting event delegation

Flag of South Korea

South Korea competed at the 2011 World Aquatics Championships in Shanghai, China between July 16 and 31, 2011.

== Medalists ==
Medal	Name	Sport	Event	Date
Gold	Park Tae-Hwan	Swimming	Men's 400 metre freestyle	24 July

== Swimming ==
South Korea qualified 18 swimmers.

Men

Athlete	Event	Heats		Semifinals		Final	
Athlete	Event	Time	Rank	Time	Rank	Time	Rank
Park Tae-Hwan	Men's 100m Freestyle	48.91	14 Q	48.86	14	did not advance	
Park Tae-Hwan	Men's 200m Freestyle	1:46.63	4 Q	1:46.23	4 Q	1:44.92	4
Park Tae-Hwan	Men's 400m Freestyle	3:46.74	7 Q			3:42.04	1st place, gold medalist(s)
Jang Sang-Jin	Men's 800m Freestyle	8:11.94	31			did not advance	
Park Seon-Kwan	Men's 100m Backstroke	55.39	35	did not advance			
Kim Ji-Heun	Men's 200m Backstroke	2:01.06	25	did not advance			
Choi Kyu-Woong	Men's 100m Breaststroke	1:01.83	37	did not advance			
Choi Kyu-Woong	Men's 200m Breaststroke	2:12.69	14 Q	2:11.27	7 Q	2:11.17	7
Ham Jong-Hun	Men's 100m Butterfly	53.94	36	did not advance			
Chang Gyu-Cheol	Men's 200m Butterfly	1:58.02	23	did not advance			
Jung Won-Yong	Men's 200m Individual Medley	2:02.50	27	did not advance			
Jung Won-Yong	Men's 400m Individual Medley	4:18.98	15			did not advance	
South Korea	Men's 4 × 100 m Freestyle Relay	DNS				did not advance	
South Korea	Men's 4 × 200 m Freestyle Relay	DNS				did not advance	
South Korea	Men's 4 × 100 m Medley Relay	DNS				did not advance	

Women

Athlete	Event	Heats		Semifinals		Final	
Athlete	Event	Time	Rank	Time	Rank	Time	Rank
Kim Jung-Hye	Women's 200m Freestyle	2:03.13	38	did not advance			
Kim Ga-Eul	Women's 400m Freestyle	4:23.94	32			did not advance	
Han Na-Kyeong	Women's 1500m Freestyle	17:06.37	23			did not advance	
Ham Chan-Mi	Women's 200m Backstroke	2:14.88	28	did not advance			
Kim Dal-Eun	Women's 50m Breaststroke	32.43	21	did not advance			
Baek Su-Yeon	Women's 100m Breaststroke	1:10.00	28	did not advance			
Baek Su-Yeon	Women's 200m Breaststroke	2:27.43	12 Q	2:26.61	13	did not advance	
Jeong Da-Rae	Women's 200m Breaststroke	2:28.14	19	did not advance			
An Se-Hyeon	Women's 100m Butterfly	1:00.76	37	did not advance			
Choi Hye-Ra	Women's 200m Butterfly	2:09.33	15 Q	2:08.81	13	did not advance	
Choi Hye-Ra	Women's 200m Individual Medley	2:13.00	9 Q	2:15.90	16	did not advance	
Kim Hye-Rim	Women's 400m Individual Medley	4:48.97	26			did not advance	
South Korea	Women's 4 × 200 m Freestyle	DNS				did not advance	
South Korea	Women's 4 × 100 m Medley Relay	DNS				did not advance	

== Synchronised swimming ==
South Korea has qualified 2 athletes in synchronised swimming.

Women

Athlete	Event	Preliminary		Final	
Athlete	Event	Points	Rank	Points	Rank
Park Hyun-Ha	Solo Technical Routine	83.300	14	did not advance	
Park Hyun-Sun	Solo Free Routine	84.790	13	did not advance	
Park Hyun-Ha; Park Hyun-Sun	Duet Technical Routine	85.500	15	did not advance	
Park Hyun-Ha; Park Hyun-Sun	Duet Free Routine	85.600	15	did not advance	
