= Sara Labrousse =

French synchronized swimmer

Personal information
- Born: 15 April 1988 (age 38) Lyon, France
- Height: 175 cm (5 ft 9 in) (2012)
- Weight: 59 kg (130 lb) (2012)

Sport
- Country: France
- Sport: Synchronized swimming
- Events: Duet, Team, Combination
- Club: Hyères Natation Synchro

Achievements and titles
- Olympic finals: 2012 Summer Olympics
- World finals: 2007, 2009 and 2011 World Aquatics Championships
- Regional finals: 2008, 2010 and 2012 European Aquatics Championships

Sara Labrousse (born 15 April 1988) is a French competitor in synchronized swimming. In the 2012 Summer Olympics, held in London, United Kingdom, she came tenth in the Women's Duet competition (alongside Chloé Willhelm).
