= Chloé Willhelm =

French synchronized swimmer

Personal information
- Born: 8 July 1989 (age 37) Saint-Priest-en-Jarez
- Height: 168 cm (5 ft 6 in) (2012)
- Weight: 53 kg (117 lb) (2012)

Sport
- Country: France
- Sport: Synchronized swimming
- Events: Duet, Team, Combination
- Club: Les Dauphins de firminy

Achievements and titles
- Olympic finals: 2012 Summer Olympics
- World finals: 2007, 2009 and 2011 World Aquatics Championships
- Regional finals: 2008, 2010 and 2012 European Aquatics Championships

Chloé Willhelm (born 8 July 1989, in Saint-Priest-en-Jarez) is a French competitor in synchronized swimming. In the 2012 Summer Olympics, held in London, United Kingdom, she came tenth in the Women's Duet competition (alongside Sara Labrousse).
