= William Meynard =

French swimmer

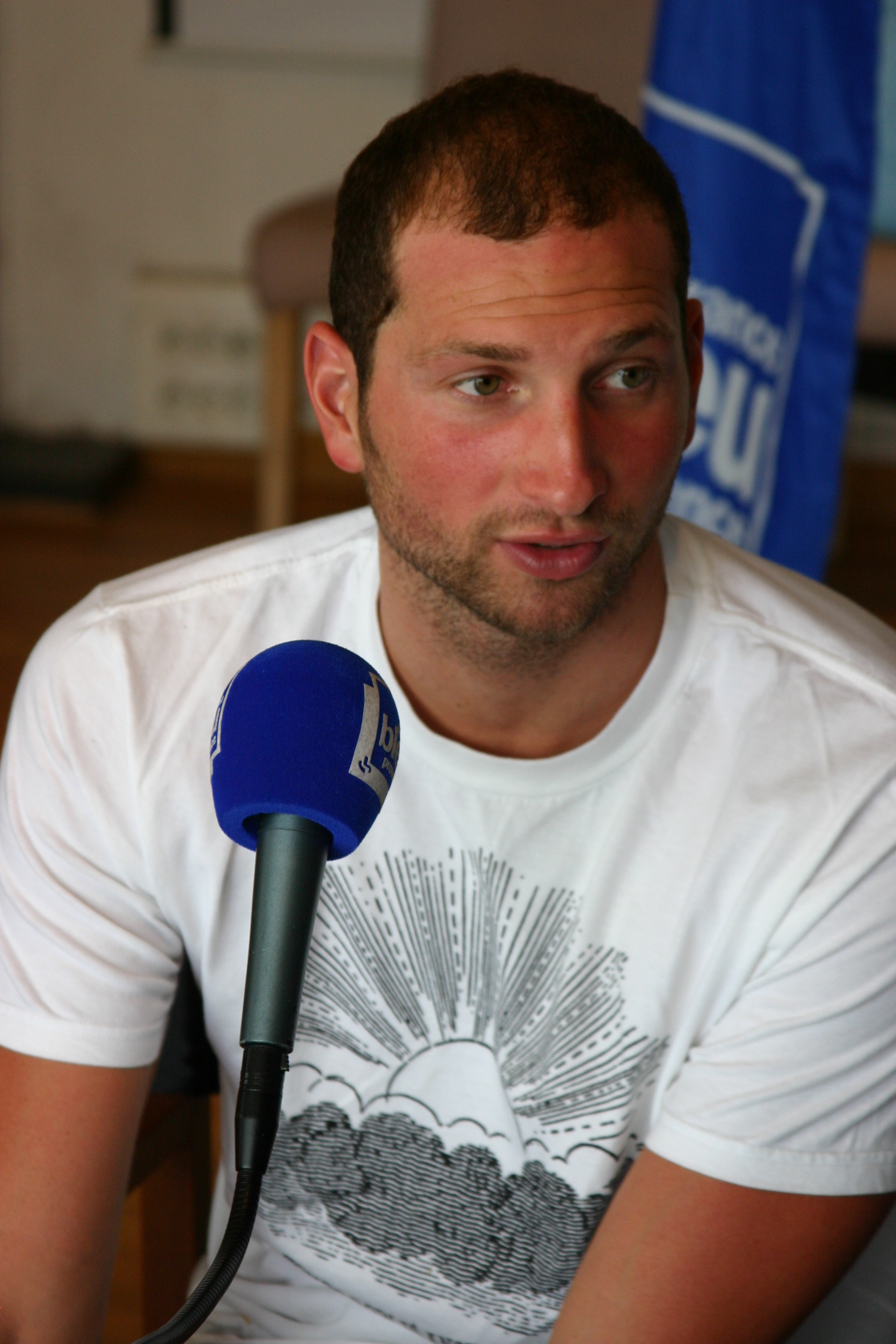
- Meynard in 2012

Personal information
- Nationality: French
- Born: 11 July 1987 (age 39) Marseille, France

Sport
- Sport: Swimming
- Strokes: Freestyle
- Club: Cercle des nageurs de Marseille
Medal record
Olympic Games
Silver medal – second place	2016 Rio de Janeiro	4×100 m freestyle
World Championships (LC)
Silver medal – second place	2011 Shanghai	4×100 m freestyle
Bronze medal – third place	2009 Rome	4×100 m freestyle
Bronze medal – third place	2011 Shanghai	100 metre freestyle
World Championships (SC)
Gold medal – first place	2010 Dubai	4×100 m freestyle
European Championships (LC)
Gold medal – first place	2010 Budapest	4×100 m medley
Gold medal – first place	2016 London	4×100 m freestyle
Silver medal – second place	2010 Budapest	4×100 m freestyle
Bronze medal – third place	2010 Budapest	100 m freestyle

William Meynard (born 11 July 1987) is a French swimmer. He won a bronze medal in the Men's 100 metre freestyle at the 2011 World Aquatics Championships in Shanghai, with a time of 48.00.
