= Julien Sauvage =

French swimmer

Personal information
- Born: 2 August 1985 (age 41) Avignon, France
- Height: 184 cm (6 ft 0 in)
- Weight: 81 kg (179 lb)

Sport
- Sport: Swimming

Julien Sauvage (born 2 August 1985) is a French professional swimmer, specialising in open water swimming. He competed at the 2012 Summer Olympics.
