= Jessica Roux =

South African swimmer (born 1992)

Personal information
- Born: November 10, 1992 (age 33) Port Elizabeth, South Africa

Sport
- Sport: Swimming
- Club: Bay Eagle Swim Team, Durban

Jessica Roux (born 10 November 1992) is a South African distance swimmer. Her club is the Swimcats/Bay Eagle Swim Team, and she is based in Durban. She is also trained in hockey and water polo.

At the time of the 2012 Olympics she was a student at Varsity College. She trained for the 2012 Summer Olympics in the bay at Cape Town where the water is colder. At the 2012 olympics in London she competed in the Women's marathon 10 kilometre, but didn't complete the race, and had to be taken to safety on a raft and taken away in a wheelchair.
