= Open water swimming at the 2011 World Aquatics Championships =

Swimming competition

- Host city: Shanghai, China
- Events: 7

The open water swimming portion of the 2011 World Aquatics Championships was held between July 19–23 in Shanghai, China at the Jinshan City Beach.

== Events ==
The following events were contested by both men and women in Shanghai:

- 5 km
- 10 km
- 25 km

In addition, there was a team competition with male and female competitors.

== Schedule ==
Day	Event
Tuesday, July 19, 2011	Women's 10 km
Wednesday, July 20, 2011	Men's 10 km
Thursday, July 21, 2011	5 km team
Friday, July 22, 2011	Women's 5 km
Friday, July 22, 2011	Men's 5 km
Saturday, July 23, 2011	Men's 25 km
Saturday, July 23, 2011	Women's 25 km

== Medal table ==
Rank	Nation	Gold	Silver	Bronze	Total
1	Germany	1	2	1	4
2	Greece	1	1	1	3
3	United States	1	0	1	2
4	Brazil	1	0	0	1
4	Bulgaria	1	0	0	1
4	Great Britain	1	0	0	1
4	Switzerland	1	0	0	1
8	Russia	0	1	2	3
9	Italy	0	1	1	2
10	Australia	0	1	0	1
10	France	0	1	0	1
12	Hungary	0	0	1	1
Totals (12 entries)		7	7	7	21

== Medal summary ==
=== Men ===
Event	Gold		Silver		Bronze	
5 km	Thomas Lurz (GER)	56:16.6	Spyridon Gianniotis (GRE)	56:17.4	Evgeny Drattsev (RUS)	56:18.5
10 km	Spyridon Gianniotis (GRE)	1:54:24.7	Thomas Lurz (GER)	1:54:27.2	Sergey Bolshakov (RUS)	1:54:31.8
25 km	Petar Stoychev (BUL)	5:10:39.8	Vladimir Dyatchin (RUS)	5:11:15.6	Csaba Gercsák (HUN)	5:11:18.1

=== Women ===
Event	Gold		Silver		Bronze	
5 km	Swann Oberson (SUI)	1:00:39.7	Aurelie Muller (FRA)	1:00:40.1	Ashley Twichell (USA)	1:00:40.2
10 km	Keri-Anne Payne (GBR)	2:01:58.1	Martina Grimaldi (ITA)	2:01:59.9	Marianna Lymperta (GRE)	2:02:01.8
25 km	Ana Marcela Cunha (BRA)	5:29:22.9	Angela Maurer (GER)	5:29:25.0	Alice Franco (ITA)	5:29:30.8

=== Team ===
Event	Gold		Silver		Bronze	
Team	United States; Andrew Gemmell; Sean Ryan; Ashley Twichell	57:00.6	Australia; Melissa Gorman; Rhys Mainstone; Ky Hurst	57:01.8	Germany; Jan Wolfgarten; Thomas Lurz; Isabelle Härle	57:44.2
