= Swann Oberson =

Swiss swimmer (born 1986)

Personal information
- Born: July 26, 1986 (age 39) Geneva, Switzerland

Sport
- Sport: Swimming
- Strokes: Open water swimming
Medal record
Representing Switzerland
World Championships
Gold medal – first place	2011 Shanghai	5km open water

Swann Oberson (born 26 July 1986) is a Swiss open-water swimmer. In the 2008 Summer Olympics, she finished sixth in the 10 km marathon swimming event. At the 2011 World Aquatics Championships she received gold in open water swimming – Women's 5 km. She competed for Switzerland at the 2012 Summer Olympics, again in the 10 km marathon, and finished in 18th place.
