= Ophélie Aspord =

French swimmer

Personal information
- Born: 21 May 1991 (age 35) Bruges, France
- Height: 174 cm (5 ft 9 in) (2012)
- Weight: 62 kg (137 lb) (2012)

Sport
- Sport: Swimming
- Club: Aviron Bayonnais

Ophélie Aspord (born 21 May 1991) is a French distance swimmer. At the 2012 Summer Olympics, she competed in the women's marathon 10 kilometre, finishing in sixth place.
