= Swimming at the 2011 World Aquatics Championships =

The swimming portion of the 2011 FINA World Championships was held July 24–31 at the Shanghai Oriental Sports Center in Shanghai, China. Swimming is one of five aquatic disciplines at the championships.

== Qualifying criteria ==
In January 2010, the FINA Bureau approved the swimming qualification system for the 2011 World Aquatics Championships. This represented the first time that a qualification system (including time standards) was used for the swimming portion of the world championships. Times had to be swum at a FINA approved competition/meet between March 1, 2010 and June 30, 2011. The qualification meets included continental championships in 2010 and 2011 (e.g. European Championships, Asian Games, Pan American Games); and international competitions approved by FINA in advance. All meets for the qualification were swum in 50 meters course.

The time standards for the 2011 FINA World Championships
Men		Event	Women	
A standard (2 entries)	B standard (1 entry)	Event	A standard (2 entries)	B standard (1 entry)
22.35	22.90	50 freestyle	25.43	26.06
49.23	50.44	100 freestyle	55.24	56.60
1:48.72	1:51.40	200 freestyle	1:59.29	2:02.24
3:49.96	3:55.63	400 freestyle	4:11.26	4:17.64
8:10.26	8:37.52	800 freestyle	8:35.98	8:48.70
15:13.16	15:35.67	1500 freestyle	16:41.49	17:10.88
25.34	25.98	50 backstroke	29.07	29.80
55.14	56.50	100 backstroke	1:01.70	1:03.22
1:59.72	2:02.67	200 backstroke	2:12.73	2:16.01
27.63	28.32	50 breaststroke	31.52	32.31
1:01.57	1:03.08	100 breaststroke	1:09.01	1:10.72
2:13.69	2:16.99	200 breaststroke	2:28.21	2:31.87
23.73	24.32	50 butterfly	26.68	27.35
52.86	54.16	100 butterfly	59.35	1:00.82
1:57.67	2:00.57	200 butterfly	2:10.84	2:14.07
2:01.40	2:04.39	200 individual medley	2:15.27	2:18.57
4:18.40	4:24.77	400 individual medley	4:45.08	4:52.11

The qualifying system for individual events was similar to what is employed for the Olympics. Historically, there has been a limit of 2 swimmers per country per individual event, and one relay team per country per relay event. This limitation remains; however, if a country wished to have more than one male and one female swimmer in up to 2 events each, then an athlete(s) had to meet one of two standards:

- a B standard which qualifies up to one swimmer per event, or
- an A standard which qualifies up to two swimmers per event, where both swimmers must meet this faster standard.

== Events ==
The swimming competition featured races in a long course (50 m) pool in 40 events (20 for males, 20 for females; 17 individual events and 3 relays for each gender).

The evening session schedule for the 2011 World Aquatics Championships is shown below.

Date	Sunday; July 24, 2011	Monday; July 25, 2011	Tuesday; July 26, 2011	Wednesday; July 27, 2011
E v e n t s	Women's 100 fly [sf] Men's 400 free Women's 200 IM [sf] Men's 50 fly [sf] Women's 400 free Men's 100 breast [sf] Women's 4 × 100 freestyle Men's 4 × 100 freestyle	Women's 100 fly Men's 100 back [sf] Women's 100 breast [sf] Men's 50 fly Women's 100 back [sf] Men's 200 free [sf] Women's 200 IM; Men's 100 breast	Men's 200 free Women's 100 back Men's 50 breast [sf] Women's 1500 free Men's 100 back Women's 200 free [sf] Men's 200 fly [sf] Women's 100 breast	Men's 100 free [sf] Women's 50 back [sf] Men's 200 fly Women's 200 free Men's 800 free Women's 200 fly [sf] Men's 200 IM [sf] Men's 50 breast
Date	Thursday; July 28, 2011	Friday; July 29, 2011	Saturday; July 30, 2011	Sunday; July 31, 2011
E v e n t s	Women's 100 free [sf] Men's 200 IM; Women's 200 breast [sf] Men's 100 free Women's 200 fly Men's 200 breast [sf] Women's 50 back Men's 200 back [sf] Women's 4 × 200 freestyle	Women's 100 free Men's 200 back Women's 50 fly [sf] Men's 50 free [sf] Women's 200 breast Men's 100 fly [sf] Women's 200 back [sf] Men's 200 breast Men's 4 × 200 freestyle	Women's 50 fly Men's 50 free Women's 50 breast [sf] Women's 200 back Men's 100 fly Women's 50 free [sf] Men's 50 back [sf] Women's 800 free Women's 4 × 100 medley	Women's 50 breast Men's 400 IM; Women's 50 free Men's 50 back Men's 1500 free Women's 400 IM; Men's 4 × 100 medley

Note: prelims/semifinals/finals will be swum in events 200 m and shorter; prelims/finals in events 400 m or longer. For prelims/semifinals/finals events, prelims and semis will be held on the same day, with finals being the evening of the following day. For the 400 m events and the 800 m relays, prelims and finals are the same day. For the individual 800 m and 1500 m races, prelims are in the morning of one day, with finals in the evening of the next day. Preliminary sessions began at 9:00 a.m.; finals at 6:00 p.m.

== Medal table ==
Rank	Nation	Gold	Silver	Bronze	Total
1	United States	16	5	8	29
2	China	5	2	7	14
3	Brazil	3	0	0	3
4	Australia	2	8	3	13
5	France	2	3	5	10
6	Great Britain	2	3	0	5
6	Italy	2	3	0	5
8	Netherlands	2	1	3	6
9	Denmark	2	1	0	3
10	Russia	1	3	0	4
11	Sweden	1	1	0	2
12	Hungary	1	0	3	4
13	Belarus	1	0	0	1
13	Norway	1	0	0	1
13	South Korea	1	0	0	1
16	Japan	0	4	2	6
17	Canada	0	3	1	4
18	Poland	0	1	0	1
19	Germany	0	0	5	5
20	South Africa	0	0	3	3
Totals (20 entries)		42	38	40	120

== Results ==
=== Men's events ===
Event	Gold		Silver		Bronze	
50 m freestyle	César Cielo; Brazil	21.52	Luca Dotto; Italy	21.90	Alain Bernard; France	21.92
100 m freestyle	James Magnussen; Australia	47.63	Brent Hayden; Canada	47.95	William Meynard; France	48.00
200 m freestyle	Ryan Lochte; United States	1:44.44	Michael Phelps; United States	1:44.79	Paul Biedermann; Germany	1:44.88
400 m freestyle	Park Tae-Hwan; South Korea	3:42.04	Sun Yang; China	3:43.24	Paul Biedermann; Germany	3:44.14
800 m freestyle	Sun Yang; China	7:38.57	Ryan Cochrane; Canada	7:41.86; AM	Gergő Kis; Hungary	7:44.94; NR
1500 m freestyle	Sun Yang; China	14:34.14; WR	Ryan Cochrane; Canada	14:44.46	Gergő Kis; Hungary	14:45.66; NR
50 m backstroke	Liam Tancock; Great Britain	24.50	Camille Lacourt; France	24.57	Gerhard Zandberg; South Africa	24.66
100 m backstroke	Jérémy Stravius; France; Camille Lacourt; France	52.76	Not awarded		Ryosuke Irie; Japan	52.98
200 m backstroke	Ryan Lochte; United States	1:52.96	Ryosuke Irie; Japan	1:54.11	Tyler Clary; United States	1:54.69
50 m breaststroke	Felipe França Silva; Brazil	27.01	Fabio Scozzoli; Italy	27.17; NR	Cameron van der Burgh; South Africa	27.19
100 m breaststroke	Alexander Dale Oen; Norway	58.71; NR	Fabio Scozzoli; Italy	59.42; NR	Cameron van der Burgh; South Africa	59.49
200 m breaststroke	Dániel Gyurta; Hungary	2:08.41	Kosuke Kitajima; Japan	2:08.63	Christian vom Lehn; Germany	2:09.06
50 m butterfly	César Cielo; Brazil	23.10	Matthew Targett; Australia	23.28	Geoff Huegill; Australia	23.35
100 m butterfly	Michael Phelps; United States	50.71	Konrad Czerniak; Poland	51.15; NR	Tyler McGill; United States	51.26
200 m butterfly	Michael Phelps; United States	1:53.34	Takeshi Matsuda; Japan	1:54.01	Wu Peng; China	1:54.67
200 m individual medley	Ryan Lochte; United States	1:54.00; WR	Michael Phelps; United States	1:54.16	László Cseh; Hungary	1:57.69
400 m individual medley	Ryan Lochte; United States	4:07.13	Tyler Clary; United States	4:11.17	Yuya Horihata; Japan	4:11.98
4 × 100 m freestyle relay	Australia; James Magnussen (47.49); Matthew Targett (47.87); Matthew Abood (47.92); Eamon Sullivan (47.72)	3:11.00	France; Alain Bernard (48.75); Jérémy Stravius (47.78); William Meynard (47.39); Fabien Gilot (47.22)	3:11.14	United States; Michael Phelps (48.08); Garrett Weber-Gale (48.33); Jason Lezak (48.15); Nathan Adrian (47.40)	3:11.96
4 × 200 m freestyle relay	United States; Michael Phelps (1:45.53); Peter Vanderkaay (1:46.07); Ricky Berens (1:46.51); Ryan Lochte (1:44.56)	7:02.67	France; Yannick Agnel (1:45.25); Grégory Mallet (1:46.81); Jérémy Stravius (1:45.40); Fabien Gilot (1:47.35)	7:04.81; NR	China; Wang Shun (1:47.09); Zhang Lin (1:46.14); Li Yunqi (1:47.30); Sun Yang (1:45.14)	7:05.67; NR
4 × 100 m medley relay	United States; Nick Thoman (53.61); Mark Gangloff (1:00.24); Michael Phelps (50.57); Nathan Adrian (47.64)	3:32.06	Australia; Hayden Stoeckel (54.22); Brenton Rickard (59.32); Geoff Huegill (51.72); James Magnussen (47.00)	3:32.26	Germany; Helge Meeuw (53.53); Hendrik Feldwehr (59.72); Benjamin Starke (51.83); Paul Biedermann (47.52)	3:32.60
AF African record | AM Americas record | AS Asian record | CR Championship record | ER European record | OC Oceania record | WR World record | NR National record

=== Women's events ===
Event	Gold		Silver		Bronze	
50 m freestyle	Therese Alshammar; Sweden	24.14	Ranomi Kromowidjojo; Netherlands	24.27	Marleen Veldhuis; Netherlands	24.49
100 m freestyle	Aleksandra Gerasimenya; Belarus; Jeanette Ottesen; Denmark	53.45; NR 53.45	Not awarded		Ranomi Kromowidjojo; Netherlands	53.66
200 m freestyle	Federica Pellegrini; Italy	1:55.58	Kylie Palmer; Australia	1:56.04	Camille Muffat; France	1:56.10
400 m freestyle	Federica Pellegrini; Italy	4:01.97	Rebecca Adlington; Great Britain	4:04.01	Camille Muffat; France	4:04.06
800 m freestyle	Rebecca Adlington; Great Britain	8:17.51	Lotte Friis; Denmark	8:18.20	Kate Ziegler; United States	8:23.36
1500 m freestyle	Lotte Friis; Denmark	15:49.59	Kate Ziegler; United States	15:55.60	Li Xuanxu; China	15:58.02; AS
50 m backstroke	Anastasia Zueva; Russia	27.79	Aya Terakawa; Japan	27.93	Missy Franklin; United States	28.01
100 m backstroke	Zhao Jing; China	59.05	Anastasia Zueva; Russia	59.06	Natalie Coughlin; United States	59.15
200 m backstroke	Missy Franklin; United States	2:05.10; AM	Belinda Hocking; Australia	2:06.06; OC	Sharon van Rouwendaal; Netherlands	2:07.78; NR
50 m breaststroke	Jessica Hardy; United States	30.19	Yuliya Efimova; Russia	30.49	Rebecca Soni; United States	30.58
100 m breaststroke	Rebecca Soni; United States	1:05.05	Leisel Jones; Australia	1:06.25	Ji Liping; China	1:06.52
200 m breaststroke	Rebecca Soni; United States	2:21.47	Yuliya Efimova; Russia	2:22.22; NR	Martha McCabe; Canada	2:24.81
50 m butterfly	Inge Dekker; Netherlands	25.71	Therese Alshammar; Sweden	25.76	Mélanie Henique; France	25.86; NR
100 m butterfly	Dana Vollmer; United States	56.87	Alicia Coutts; Australia	56.94	Lu Ying; China	57.06
200 m butterfly	Jiao Liuyang; China	2:05.55	Ellen Gandy; Great Britain	2:05.59	Liu Zige; China	2:05.90
200 m individual medley	Ye Shiwen; China	2:08.90	Alicia Coutts; Australia	2:09.00	Ariana Kukors; United States	2:09.12
400 m individual medley	Elizabeth Beisel; United States	4:31.78	Hannah Miley; Great Britain	4:34.22	Stephanie Rice; Australia	4:34.23
4 × 100 m freestyle relay	Netherlands; Inge Dekker (54.91); Ranomi Kromowidjojo (53.26); Marleen Veldhuis (53.33); Femke Heemskerk (52.46)	3:33.96	United States; Natalie Coughlin (54.09); Missy Franklin (52.99); Jessica Hardy (54.12); Dana Vollmer (53.27)	3:34.47	Germany; Britta Steffen (54.51); Silke Lippok (54.17); Lisa Vitting (53.85); Daniela Schreiber (53.12)	3:36.05
4 × 200 m freestyle relay	United States; Missy Franklin (1:55.06); Dagny Knutson (1:57.18); Katie Hoff (1:57.41); Allison Schmitt (1:56.49)	7:46.14	Australia; Bronte Barratt (1:56.86); Blair Evans (1:57.69); Angie Bainbridge (1:57.36); Kylie Palmer (1:55.51)	7:47.42	China; Chen Qian (1:57.37); Pang Jiaying (1:56.97); Liu Jing (1:57.85); Tang Yi (1:55.47)	7:47.66
4 × 100 m medley relay	United States; Natalie Coughlin (59.12); Rebecca Soni (1:04.71); Dana Vollmer (55.74); Missy Franklin (52.79)	3:52.36; AM	China; Zhao Jing (59.24); Ji Liping (1:06.27); Lu Ying (56.77); Tang Yi (53.33)	3:55.61	Australia; Belinda Hocking (59.91); Leisel Jones (1:06.18); Alicia Coutts (56.69); Merindah Dingjan (54.35)	3:57.13
AF African record | AM Americas record | AS Asian record | CR Championship record | ER European record | OC Oceania record | WR World record | NR National record

== World records ==
The following world records were established during the competition:

Date	Event	Time	Name	Nation
July 28, 2011	Men's 200 m individual medley final	1:54.00	Ryan Lochte	United States
July 31, 2011	Men's 1500 m freestyle final	14:34.14	Sun Yang	China
