= Flori Lang =

Swiss swimmer (born 1983)

Personal information
- Born: 30 January 1983 (age 43) Zurich, Switzerland
- Height: 1.87 m (6 ft 2 in)
- Weight: 77 kg (170 lb)

Sport
- Sport: Swimming, Finswimming
- Club: SC Uster Wallisellen
Medal record
Men's swimming
Representing Switzerland
European Championships (SC)
| Bronze medal – third place | 2003 Dublin | 4×50 m medley |
| Silver medal – second place | 2011 Szczecin | 50 m backstroke |
European Championships (LC)
| Silver medal – second place | 2008 Eindhoven | 50 m backstroke |

Flori Lang (born 30 January 1983) is a Swiss sprinter swimmer who won three medals at the European Championships of 2003, 2008 and 2011. He also competed in two freestyle events at the 2008 Summer Olympics, but did not reach the finals. By 2011 he won 37 national titles.

In April 2012, he starting training in finswimming and just a few months later set a world record and won a European gold medal in 50 m with bifins.

Lang has a sister, Sandra. He holds a degree of Bachelor of Arts in Banking & Finance from the University of Zurich.
