= 2010 Pan Pacific Swimming Championships – Women's 200 metre freestyle =

Women's 200 metre freestyle at the 2010 Pan Pacific Swimming Championships
- Venue: William Woollett Jr. Aquatics Center
- Dates: August 18, 2010 (heats & finals)
- Competitors: 34 from 8 nations
- Winning time: 1:56.10

Medalists
gold medal	Allison Schmitt	United States
silver medal	Morgan Scroggy	United States
bronze medal	Blair Evans	Australia

The women's 200 metre freestyle competition at the 2010 Pan Pacific Swimming Championships took place on August 18 at the William Woollett Jr. Aquatics Center. The last champion was Katie Hoff of US.

This race consisted of four lengths of the pool, all in freestyle.

== Records ==
Prior to this competition, the existing world and Pan Pacific records were as follows:

World record	Federica Pellegrini (ITA)	1:52.98	Rome, Italy	July 29, 2009
Pan Pacific Championships record	Claudia Poll (CRC)	1:57.48	Fukuoka, Japan	August 10, 1997

== Results ==
All times are in minutes and seconds.

KEY:	q	Fastest non-qualifiers	Q	Qualified	CR	Championships record	NR	National record	PB	Personal best	SB	Seasonal best

=== Heats ===
The first round was held on August 18, at 10:16.

Rank	Heat	Lane	Name	Nationality	Time	Notes
1	5	4	Allison Schmitt	United States	1:56.23	QA, CR
2	3	5	Morgan Scroggy	United States	1:57.27	QA
3	4	4	Dana Vollmer	United States	1:57.45	QA
4	3	4	Blair Evans	Australia	1:57.71	QA
5	5	3	Kylie Palmer	Australia	1:57.89	QA
6	5	8	Genevieve Saumur	Canada	1:58.11	QA
7	3	3	Haruka Ueda	Japan	1:58.36	QA
8	4	5	Katie Hoff	United States	1:58.40	QA
9	4	6	Meagen Nay	Australia	1:58.43	QB
10	5	6	Katie Goldman	Australia	1:58.84	QB
11	3	2	Kelly Stubbins	Australia	1:58.99	QB
12	5	2	Angie Bainbridge	Australia	1:59.21	QB
13	4	3	Felicity Galvez	Australia	1:59.34	QB
14	4	1	Tash Hind	New Zealand	1:59.57	QB
15	3	6	Barbara Jardin	Canada	1:59.70	QB
16	3	7	Hanae Ito	Japan	1:59.84	QB
17	5	1	Alicia Coutts	Australia	1:59.89	
18	4	2	Samantha Cheverton	Canada	1:59.99	
19	2	7	Yayoi Matsumoto	Japan	2:00.27	
20	2	3	Melissa Ingram	New Zealand	2:00.67	
21	3	8	Alexandra Komarnycky	Canada	2:00.76	
22	2	5	Amaka Gessler	New Zealand	2:00.96	
23	2	2	Tatiana Lemos	Brazil	2:01.48	
23	5	7	Chloe Sutton	United States	2:01.48	
25	2	4	Risa Sekine	Japan	2:01.53	
26	3	1	Penny Marshall	New Zealand	2:01.63	
27	4	8	Alexandra Gabor	Canada	2:02.46	
28	2	8	Manuella Lyrio	Brazil	2:02.82	
29	2	6	Akane Hoshi	Japan	2:03.09	
30	5	5	Bronte Barratt	Australia	2:04.85	
31	2	1	Lynette Lim	Singapore	2:05.39	
32	1	4	Sarah Correa	Brazil	2:05.99	
33	1	3	Sarra Lajnef	Tunisia	2:06.16	
34	1	5	Maroua Mathlouthi	Tunisia	2:06.77	
-	4	7	Lauren Boyle	New Zealand	DNS	

=== B Final ===
The B final was held on August 18, at 18:35.

Rank	Lane	Name	Nationality	Time	Notes
9	4	Dana Vollmer	United States	1:56.47	
10	3	Hanae Ito	Japan	1:58.58	
11	5	Meagen Nay	Australia	1:59.65	
12	6	Samantha Cheverton	Canada	2:00.62	
13	1	Amaka Gessler	New Zealand	2:01.35	
14	7	Melissa Ingram	New Zealand	2:01.76	
15	2	Yayoi Matsumoto	Japan	2:02.98	
16	8	Tatiana Lemos	Brazil	2:03.11	

=== A Final ===
The A final was held on August 18, at 18:35.

Rank	Lane	Name	Nationality	Time	Notes
1st place, gold medalist(s)	4	Allison Schmitt	United States	1:56.10	CR
2nd place, silver medalist(s)	5	Morgan Scroggy	United States	1:57.13	
3rd place, bronze medalist(s)	3	Blair Evans	Australia	1:57.27	
4	6	Kylie Palmer	Australia	1:57.50	
5	7	Haruka Ueda	Japan	1:57.89	
6	2	Genevieve Saumur	Canada	1:58.20	
7	1	Tash Hind	New Zealand	1:58.80	
8	8	Barbara Jardin	Canada	1:58.98	
