= 2010 Pan Pacific Swimming Championships – Women's 400 metre freestyle =

Women's 400 metre freestyle at the 2010 Pan Pacific Swimming Championships
- Venue: William Woollett Jr. Aquatics Center
- Dates: August 20, 2010 (heats & finals)
- Competitors: 26 from 7 nations
- Winning time: 4:05.19

Medalists
| gold medal | Chloe Sutton | United States |
| silver medal | Katie Goldman | Australia |
| bronze medal | Blair Evans | Australia |

The women's 400 metre freestyle competition at the 2010 Pan Pacific Swimming Championships took place on August 20 at the William Woollett Jr. Aquatics Center. The last champion was Ai Shibata of Japan.

This race consisted of eight lengths of the pool, with all eight being in the freestyle stroke.

== Records ==
Prior to this competition, the existing world and Pan Pacific records were as follows:

| World record | Federica Pellegrini (ITA) | 3:59.15 | Rome, Italy | July 26, 2009 |
| Pan Pacific Championships record | Janet Evans (USA) | 4:04.53 | Tokyo, Japan | August 19, 1989 |

== Results ==
All times are in minutes and seconds.

| KEY: | q | Fastest non-qualifiers | Q | Qualified | CR | Championships record | NR | National record | PB | Personal best | SB | Seasonal best |

=== Heats ===
The first round was held on August 20, at 10:00.

| Rank | Heat | Lane | Name | Nationality | Time | Notes |
|---|---|---|---|---|---|---|
| 1 | 4 | 5 | Chloe Sutton | United States | 4:07.64 | QA |
| 2 | 4 | 3 | Katie Goldman | Australia | 4:08.04 | QA |
| 3 | 2 | 4 | Allison Schmitt | United States | 4:08.47 | QA |
| 4 | 3 | 3 | Kate Ziegler | United States | 4:08.63 | QA |
| 5 | 3 | 4 | Katie Hoff | United States | 4:08.93 | QA |
| 6 | 2 | 5 | Blair Evans | Australia | 4:09.96 | QA |
| 7 | 3 | 5 | Kylie Palmer | Australia | 4:10.27 | QA |
| 8 | 3 | 6 | Lauren Boyle | New Zealand | 4:10.68 | QA |
| 9 | 2 | 3 | Alexandra Komarnycky | Canada | 4:11.39 | QB |
| 10 | 2 | 6 | Haley Anderson | United States | 4:11.55 | QB |
| 11 | 4 | 7 | Yurie Yano | Japan | 4:12.72 | QB |
| 12 | 4 | 8 | Barbara Jardin | Canada | 4:13.23 | QB |
| 13 | 4 | 2 | Samantha Cheverton | Canada | 4:13.37 | QB |
| 14 | 1 | 4 | Christine Jennings | United States | 4:13.97 | QB |
| 15 | 2 | 7 | Yumi Kida | Japan | 4:14.77 | QB |
| 16 | 4 | 1 | Chika Yonenaga | Japan | 4:15.30 | QB |
| 17 | 4 | 6 | Maiko Fujino | Japan | 4:15.45 | |
| 18 | 4 | 4 | Bronte Barratt | Australia | 4:15.96 | |
| 19 | 3 | 1 | Risa Sekine | Japan | 4:16.24 | |
| 20 | 2 | 2 | Poliana Okimoto | Brazil | 4:16.32 | |
| 21 | 1 | 5 | Savannah King | Canada | 4:16.73 | |
| 22 | 3 | 8 | Tanya Hunks | Canada | 4:17.28 | |
| 23 | 1 | 2 | Manuella Lyrio | Brazil | 4:19.23 | |
| 24 | 2 | 1 | Alexandra Gabor | Canada | 4:21.45 | |
| 25 | 1 | 6 | Sarah Correa | Brazil | 4:28.38 | |
| 26 | 1 | 3 | Carmen Nam | Hong Kong | 4:29.16 | |
| - | 2 | 8 | Tash Hind | New Zealand | DNS | |
| - | 3 | 2 | Joanna Maranhão | Brazil | DNS | |
| - | 3 | 7 | Lindsay Seemann | Canada | DNS | |

=== B Final ===
The B final was held on August 20, at 18:05.

| Rank | Lane | Name | Nationality | Time | Notes |
|---|---|---|---|---|---|
| 9 | 4 | Kate Ziegler | United States | 4:05.52 | |
| 10 | 5 | Kylie Palmer | Australia | 4:11.17 | |
| 11 | 3 | Samantha Cheverton | Canada | 4:12.53 | |
| 12 | 7 | Savannah King | Canada | 4:13.34 | |
| 13 | 6 | Yumi Kida | Japan | 4:14.33 | |
| 14 | 2 | Chika Yonenaga | Japan | 4:18.22 | |
| 15 | 1 | Manuella Lyrio | Brazil | 4:18.47 | |
| 16 | 8 | Carmen Nam | Hong Kong | 4:26.38 | |

=== A Final ===
The A final was held on August 20, at 18:05.

| Rank | Lane | Name | Nationality | Time | Notes |
|---|---|---|---|---|---|
| 1st place, gold medalist(s) | 4 | Chloe Sutton | United States | 4:05.19 | |
| 2nd place, silver medalist(s) | 5 | Katie Goldman | Australia | 4:05.84 | |
| 3rd place, bronze medalist(s) | 6 | Blair Evans | Australia | 4:06.36 | |
| 4 | 3 | Allison Schmitt | United States | 4:06.76 | |
| 5 | 2 | Lauren Boyle | New Zealand | 4:09.59 | |
| 6 | 8 | Barbara Jardin | Canada | 4:11.53 | |
| 7 | 7 | Alexandra Komarnycky | Canada | 4:12.67 | |
| 8 | 1 | Yurie Yano | Japan | 4:14.95 | |
