= Swimming at the 2011 World Aquatics Championships – Women's 200 metre freestyle =

Women's 200 metre freestyle at the 2011 World Aquatics Championships
- Dates: July 26, 2011 (heats and semifinals); July 27, 2011 (final)
- Competitors: 52 from 42 nations
- Winning time: 1:55.58

Medalists
gold medal	Federica Pellegrini	Italy
silver medal	Kylie Palmer	Australia
bronze medal	Camille Muffat	France

The women's 200 metre freestyle competition of the swimming events at the 2011 World Aquatics Championships was held on July 26 with the heats and the semifinals and July 27 with the final.

== Records ==
Prior to the competition, the existing world and championship records were as follows.

	Name	Nation	Time	Location	Date
World record Championship record	Federica Pellegrini	Italy	1:52.98	Rome	July 29, 2009

== Results ==
=== Heats ===
49 swimmers participated in 7 heats.

Rank	Heat	Lane	Name	Nationality	Time	Notes
1	6	5	Allison Schmitt	United States	1:56.66	Q
2	7	4	Federica Pellegrini	Italy	1:56.87	Q
3	5	4	Bronte Barratt	Australia	1:57.37	Q
4	5	6	Ágnes Mutina	Hungary	1:57.40	Q
5	6	4	Kylie Palmer	Australia	1:57.42	Q
6	5	5	Femke Heemskerk	Netherlands	1:57.43	Q
7	7	6	Silke Lippok	Germany	1:57.53	Q
8	6	1	Lauren Boyle	New Zealand	1:57.72	Q
9	7	5	Camille Muffat	France	1.57.99	Q
10	4	4	Sara Isakovič	Slovenia	1:58.01	Q
11	7	8	Melania Costa Schmid	Spain	1:58.04	Q
12	6	3	Sarah Sjöström	Sweden	1:58.26	Q
12	6	8	Barbara Jardin	Canada	1:58.26	Q
14	7	7	Evelyn Verrasztó	Hungary	1:58.27	Q
15	6	6	Tang Yi	China	1:58.30	Q
16	6	2	Haruka Ueda	Japan	1:58.74	swimoff
16	7	1	Hanae Ito	Japan	1:58.74	swimoff
18	5	1	Samantha Cheverton	Canada	1:58.83	
19	5	3	Veronika Popova	Russia	1:58.89	
20	7	2	Morgan Scroggy	United States	1:59.22	
21	7	3	Zhu Qianwei	China	1:59.22	
22	5	8	Nina Rangelova	Bulgaria	1:59.30	
23	5	7	Joanne Jackson	Great Britain	1:59.36	
24	5	2	Rebecca Adlington	Great Britain	1:59.40	
25	4	1	Karin Prinsloo	South Africa	1:59.52	
26	4	2	Pernille Blume	Denmark	1:59.96	
27	6	7	Gabriella Fagundez	Sweden	2:00.05	
28	4	3	Sze Hang Yu	Hong Kong	2:00.52	
29	4	5	Cecilie Johannessen	Norway	2:00.56	
30	3	3	Joerdis Steinegger	Austria	2:01.06	
31	3	5	Melanie Nocher	Ireland	2:01.33	
32	4	6	Daryna Zevina	Ukraine	2:01.50	
33	4	7	Anna Stylianou	Cyprus	2:01.62	
34	3	4	Liliana Ibanez	Mexico	2:01.70	
35	4	8	Katarina Filova	Slovakia	2:01.96	
36	3	8	Katarina Listopadova	Slovakia	2:02.15	
37	3	7	Ranohon Amanova	Uzbekistan	2:02.89	
38	3	2	Kim Jungh-Hye	South Korea	2:03.13	
39	3	1	Natthanan Junkrajang	Thailand	2:03.68	
40	2	4	Andrea Cedrón	Peru	2:08.10	
41	2	1	Bayan Jumah	Syria	2:09.08	
42	2	2	Branka Vranjes	Bosnia and Herzegovina	2:09.64	
43	2	3	Heather Arseth	Mauritius	2:10.93	
44	2	7	Olivia de Maroussem	Mauritius	2:12.28	
45	2	6	Ma Cheok Mei	Macau	2:12.39	
46	2	8	Britany van Lange	Guyana	2:16.40	
47	1	3	Victoria Chentsova	Northern Mariana Islands	2:27.86	
48	1	5	Aure Fanchette	Seychelles	2:31.88	
49	1	6	Jennet Saryyeva	Turkmenistan	2:41.27	
–	1	4	Gouri Kotecha	Tanzania		DNS
–	2	5	Victoria Ho	Jamaica		DNS
–	3	6	Andreina Pinto	Venezuela		DNS

=== Swimoff ===
As two swimmers had the same time in the heats at place 16 they had to participate in a swimoff to determine the last semifinal swimmer.

Rank	Lane	Name	Nationality	Time	Notes
1	4	Haruka Ueda	Japan	1:58.19	Q
2	5	Hanae Ito	Japan	1:58.55	

=== Semifinals ===
The semifinals were held at 19:14.

==== Semifinal 1 ====
Rank	Lane	Name	Nationality	Time	Notes
1	3	Femke Heemskerk	Netherlands	1:55.54	Q
2	4	Federica Pellegrini	Italy	1:56.42	Q
3	7	Sarah Sjöström	Sweden	1:56.71	Q
4	5	Ágnes Mutina	Hungary	1:57.53	
5	6	Lauren Boyle	New Zealand	1:58.09	
6	8	Haruka Ueda	Japan	1:58.28	
7	2	Sara Isakovič	Slovenia	1:58.52	
8	1	Evelyn Verrasztó	Hungary	1:59.71	

==== Semifinal 2 ====
Rank	Lane	Name	Nationality	Time	Notes
1	3	Kylie Palmer	Australia	1:56.59	Q
2	2	Camille Muffat	France	1:56.62	Q
3	5	Bronte Barratt	Australia	1:56.90	Q
4	6	Silke Lippok	Germany	1:57.02	Q
5	4	Allison Schmitt	United States	1:57.07	Q
6	7	Melania Costa Schmid	Spain	1:57.83	NR
7	8	Tang Yi	China	1:57.91	
8	1	Barbara Jardin	Canada	1:58.18	

=== Final ===
The final was held at 18:32.

Rank	Lane	Name	Nationality	Time	Notes
1st place, gold medalist(s)	5	Federica Pellegrini	Italy	1:55.58	
2nd place, silver medalist(s)	3	Kylie Palmer	Australia	1:56.04	
3rd place, bronze medalist(s)	6	Camille Muffat	France	1:56.10	
4	2	Sarah Sjöström	Sweden	1:56.41	
5	7	Bronte Barratt	Australia	1:56.60	
6	8	Allison Schmitt	United States	1:56.98	
7	4	Femke Heemskerk	Netherlands	1:57.63	
8	1	Silke Lippok	Germany	1:58.26	
