= Swimming at the 2012 Summer Olympics – Women's 200 metre freestyle =

Women's 200 metre freestyle at the Games of the XXX Olympiad
- Venue: London Aquatics Centre
- Date: July 30, 2012 (heats & semifinals); July 31, 2012 (final)
- Competitors: 37 from 31 nations
- Winning time: 1:53.61 OR

Medalists
1st place, gold medalist(s)		Allison Schmitt	United States
2nd place, silver medalist(s)		Camille Muffat	France
3rd place, bronze medalist(s)		Bronte Barratt	Australia

The women's 200 metre freestyle event at the 2012 Summer Olympics took place on 30–31 July at the London Aquatics Centre in London, United Kingdom.

U.S. swimmer Allison Schmitt blasted a new Olympic record with a stunning effort to capture the gold medal in the event for the first time, since Nicole Haislett topped the podium in 1992. She pulled away from a tightly packed field on the final lap to hit the wall first in a sterling time of 1:53.61, shaving 1.21 seconds off the record set by Italy's Federica Pellegrini from Beijing in 2008. After defeating Schmitt in a close duel to grab the 400 m freestyle title two days earlier, France's Camille Muffat trailed behind her rival by almost a body length for the silver in 1:55.58. Meanwhile, Australia's Bronte Barratt produced a striking touch to take home the bronze in 1:55.81, edging out American teenage star Missy Franklin by a hundredth of a second.

Franklin missed a chance to add her third career medal with a fourth-place time in 1:55.82, while Pellegrini, the defending Olympic champion, dropped off the podium to fifth in 1:56.73. Russia's Veronika Popova (1:57.25), Great Britain's home favorite Caitlin McClatchey (1:57.60) and Barratt's teammate Kylie Palmer (1:57.68) closed out the field.

Notable swimmers failed to reach the top-eight final roster including Slovenia's Sara Isaković, the defending silver medalist, who placed fourteenth (1:58.47) in the semifinals; and Romania's Camelia Potec, a four-time Olympian and 2004 Olympic champion, who posted a twenty-fifth place time (2:01.15) on the morning prelims.

== Records ==
Prior to this competition, the existing world and Olympic records were as follows.

World record	Federica Pellegrini (ITA)	1:52.98	Rome, Italy	29 July 2009
Olympic record	Federica Pellegrini (ITA)	1:54.82	Beijing, China	13 August 2008

The following records were established during the competition:

Date	Event	Name	Nationality	Time	Record
July 31	Final	Allison Schmitt	United States	1:53.61	OR

== Results ==
=== Heats ===
Rank	Heat	Lane	Name	Nationality	Time	Notes
1	3	5	Federica Pellegrini	Italy	1:57.16	Q
2	5	4	Allison Schmitt	United States	1:57.33	Q
3	3	4	Missy Franklin	United States	1:57.62	Q
4	3	3	Veronika Popova	Russia	1:57.79	Q
4	5	7	Melania Costa Schmid	Spain	1:57.79	Q
6	3	6	Barbara Jardin	Canada	1:57.92	Q
7	5	5	Sarah Sjöström	Sweden	1:58.03	Q
7	4	2	Caitlin McClatchey	Great Britain	1:58.03	Q
9	3	7	Samantha Cheverton	Canada	1:58.11	Q
10	4	3	Bronte Barratt	Australia	1:58.12	Q
11	5	3	Kylie Palmer	Australia	1:58.16	Q
12	4	4	Camille Muffat	France	1:58.49	Q
13	5	6	Silke Lippok	Germany	1:58.59	Q
14	4	6	Wang Shijia	China	1:58.73	Q
15	4	1	Hanae Ito	Japan	1:58.93	Q
16	5	1	Sara Isaković	Slovenia	1:58.96	Q
17	3	2	Rebecca Turner	Great Britain	1:58.98	
18	3	1	Ophélie-Cyrielle Étienne	France	1:59.15	
19	4	8	Nina Rangelova	Bulgaria	1:59.21	NR
20	5	8	Karin Prinsloo	South Africa	1:59.24	
21	4	7	Song Wenyan	China	1:59.47	
22	5	2	Ágnes Mutina	Hungary	1:59.56	
23	3	8	Sze Hang Yu	Hong Kong	1:59.92	
24	2	5	Pernille Blume	Denmark	2:00.91	
25	2	6	Camelia Potec	Romania	2:01.15	
26	2	2	Liliana Ibanez	Mexico	2:01.36	
27	2	1	Anna Stylianou	Cyprus	2:01.87	
28	2	8	Katarína Filová	Slovakia	2:02.03	
29	2	4	Jördis Steinegger	Austria	2:02.39	
30	1	3	Natthanan Junkrajang	Thailand	2:02.49	
31	1	5	Danielle Villars	Switzerland	2:03.55	
32	2	7	Hanna-Maria Seppälä	Finland	2:04.21	
33	1	4	Baek Il-joo	South Korea	2:04.32	
34	1	6	Heather Arseth	Mauritius	2:07.81	
35	1	2	Aurelie Fanchette	Seychelles	2:23.49	
	2	3	Gráinne Murphy	Ireland	DNS	
	4	5	Femke Heemskerk	Netherlands	DNS	

=== Semifinals ===
==== Semifinal 1 ====
Rank	Lane	Name	Nationality	Time	Notes
1	2	Bronte Barratt	Australia	1:56.08	Q
2	4	Allison Schmitt	United States	1:56.15	Q
3	7	Camille Muffat	France	1:56.18	Q
4	5	Veronika Popova	Russia	1:56.84	Q, NR
5	3	Barbara Jardin	Canada	1:57.91	
6	6	Sarah Sjöström	Sweden	1:58.12	
7	8	Sara Isaković	Slovenia	1:58.47	
8	1	Wang Shijia	China	1:58.63	

==== Semifinal 2 ====
Rank	Lane	Name	Nationality	Time	Notes
1	4	Federica Pellegrini	Italy	1:56.67	Q
2	6	Caitlin McClatchey	Great Britain	1:57.33	Q
3	7	Kylie Palmer	Australia	1:57.44	Q
4	5	Missy Franklin	United States	1:57.57	Q
5	3	Melania Costa Schmid	Spain	1:57.76	
6	2	Samantha Cheverton	Canada	1:57.98	
7	1	Silke Lippok	Germany	1:58.24	
8	8	Hanae Ito	Japan	1:59.62	

=== Final ===
Rank	Lane	Name	Nationality	Time	Notes
1st place, gold medalist(s)	5	Allison Schmitt	United States	1:53.61	OR, AM
2nd place, silver medalist(s)	3	Camille Muffat	France	1:55.58	
3rd place, bronze medalist(s)	4	Bronte Barratt	Australia	1:55.81	
4	8	Missy Franklin	United States	1:55.82	
5	6	Federica Pellegrini	Italy	1:56.73	
6	2	Veronika Popova	Russia	1:57.25	
7	7	Caitlin McClatchey	Great Britain	1:57.60	
8	1	Kylie Palmer	Australia	1:57.68	
