= Swimming at the 2010 Commonwealth Games – Women's 200 metre freestyle =

The Women's 200 metre freestyle event at the 2010 Commonwealth Games took place on 4 October 2010, at the SPM Swimming Pool Complex.

Four heats were held, with most containing the maximum number of swimmers (eight). The heat in which a swimmer competed did not formally matter for advancement, as the swimmers with the top eight times from the entire field qualified for the finals.

== Heats ==
The Heats will start on 8:30 local time.

=== Heat 1 ===
Rank	Lane	Name	Nationality	Time	Notes
1	3	Arti Ghorpade	India	2.12.20	
2	4	Olivia De Maroussem	Mauritius	2.20.32	
3	5	Tori Flowers	Cayman Islands	2.21.80	

=== Heat 2 ===
Rank	Lane	Name	Nationality	Time	Notes
1	4	Kylie Palmer	Australia	1:58.71	Q
2	3	Jo Jackson	England	1:59.33	Q
3	5	Jazz Carlin	Wales	1:59.59	Q
4	6	Emma Saunders	England	2:01.51	
5	7	Georgia Davies	Wales	2:02.24	
6	2	Anna Stylianou	Cyprus	2:03.19	
7	1	Surabhi Tipre	India	2:09.82	
8	8	Anna-Liza Mopio-Jane	Papua New Guinea	2:10.62	

=== Heat 3 ===
Rank	Lane	Name	Nationality	Time	Notes
1	5	Genevieve Saumur	Canada	1:59.97	Q
2	3	Natasha Hind	New Zealand	2:00.35	
3	4	Bronte Barratt	Australia	2:00.37	
4	7	Melanie Nocher	Northern Ireland	2:01.57	
5	2	Clare Dawson	Northern Ireland	2:02.39	
6	6	Caitlin McClatchey	Scotland	2:02.51	
7	1	Kah Yan Chan	Malaysia	2:05.78	
8	8	Shannon Austin	Seychelles	2:15.00	

=== Heat 4 ===
Rank	Lane	Name	Nationality	Time	Notes
1	4	Blair Evans	Australia	1:59.25	Q
2	3	Lauren Boyle	New Zealand	1:59.33	Q
3	5	Rebecca Adlington	England	1:59.68	Q
4	6	Barbara Jardin	Canada	2:00.32	Q
5	2	Penelope Marshall	New Zealand	2:01.35	
6	1	Sycerika McMahon	Northern Ireland	2:02.08	
7	7	Danielle Stirrat	Wales	2:04.52	
8	8	Victoria Ho	Jamaica	2:08.49	

=== Final ===
Rank	Lane	Name	Nationality	Time	Notes
1st place, gold medalist(s)	4	Kylie Palmer	Australia	01:57.50	
2nd place, silver medalist(s)	2	Jazz Carlin	Wales	01:58.29	
3rd place, bronze medalist(s)	7	Rebecca Adlington	England	01:58.47	
4	1	Genevieve Saumur	Canada	01:58.50	
5	6	Jo Jackson	England	01:58.66	
6	5	Blair Evans	Australia	01:58.83	
7	3	Lauren Boyle	New Zealand	01:58.96	
8	8	Barbara Jardin	Canada	02:00.76	

== See also ==
- 2010 Commonwealth Games
- Swimming at the 2010 Commonwealth Games
