= 2014 Pan Pacific Swimming Championships – Women's 4 × 200 metre freestyle relay =

Swimming Championship

Women's 4 × 200 metre freestyle relay at the 2014 Pan Pacific Swimming Championships
- Venue: Gold Coast Aquatic Centre
- Dates: August 22, 2014 (heats & finals)
- Winning time: 7:46.40

Medalists
gold medal	Shannon Vreeland, Missy Franklin, Leah Smith and Katie Ledecky	United States
silver medal	Bronte Barratt, Emma McKeon, Brittany Elmslie and Melanie Schlanger	Australia
bronze medal	Brittany MacLean, Samantha Cheverton, Alyson Ackman and Emily Overholt	Canada

The women's 4 × 200 metre freestyle relay competition at the 2014 Pan Pacific Swimming Championships took place on August 22 at the Gold Coast Aquatic Centre. The last champion was the United States.

This race consisted of sixteen lengths of the pool. Each of the four swimmers completed four lengths of the pool. The first swimmer had to touch the wall before the second could leave the starting block.

== Records ==
Prior to this competition, the existing world and Pan Pacific records were as follows:

World record	China (CHN); Yang Yu (1:55.47); Zhu Qianwei (1:55.79); Liu Jing (1:56.09); Pang Jiaying (1:54.73)	7:42.08	Rome, Italy	July 30, 2009
Pan Pacific Championships record	United States (USA); Dana Vollmer (1:58.05); Morgan Scroggy (1:57.89); Katie Hoff (1:58.70); Allison Schmitt (1:56.57)	7:51.21	Irvine, United States	August 19, 2010

== Results ==
All times are in minutes and seconds.

KEY:	q	Fastest non-qualifiers	Q	Qualified	CR	Championships record	NR	National record	PB	Personal best	SB	Seasonal best

=== Heats ===
Heats weren't performed, as only six teams had entered.

=== Final ===
The final was held on August 22, at 21:23.

Rank	Name	Nationality	Time	Notes
1st place, gold medalist(s)	Shannon Vreeland (1:57.89); Missy Franklin (1:56.12); Leah Smith (1:58.03); Katie Ledecky (1:54.36)	United States	7:46.40	CR
2nd place, silver medalist(s)	Bronte Barratt (1:58.07); Emma McKeon (1:55.85); Brittany Elmslie (1:56.92); Melanie Schlanger (1:56.63)	Australia	7:47.47	
3rd place, bronze medalist(s)	Brittany MacLean (1:57.67); Samantha Cheverton (1:58.70); Alyson Ackman (2:00.14); Emily Overholt (2:01.52)	Canada	7:58.03	
4	Chihiro Igarashi (1:59.71); Yasuko Miyamoto (2:00.11); Aya Takano (2:00.23); Misaki Yamaguchi (2:00.78)	Japan	8:00.83	
5	Lauren Boyle (1:59.51); Samantha Lucie-Smith (2:00.90); Samantha Lee (2:02.34); Emma Robinson (2:01.83)	New Zealand	8:04.58	
6	Kin Lok Chan (2:07.89); Camille Cheng (2:01.85); Claudia Lau (2:08.86); Sze Hang Yu (2:04.93)	Hong Kong	8:23.53	
