= Swimming at the 2013 World Aquatics Championships – Women's 4 × 200 metre freestyle relay =

Women's 4 × 200 metre freestyle relay at the 2013 World Aquatics Championships
- Venue: Palau Sant Jordi
- Dates: August 1, 2013 (heats & final)
- Competitors: 52 from 13 nations
- Winning time: 7:45.14

Medalists
gold medal	Katie Ledecky; Shannon Vreeland; Karlee Bispo; Missy Franklin	United States
silver medal	Bronte Barratt; Kylie Palmer; Brittany Elmslie; Alicia Coutts	Australia
bronze medal	Camille Muffat; Charlotte Bonnet; Mylène Lazare; Coralie Balmy	France

Barcelona Palau San Jordi

The women's 4 × 200 metre freestyle relay event in swimming at the 2013 World Aquatics Championships took place on 1 August at the Palau Sant Jordi in Barcelona, Spain.

== Records ==
Prior to this competition, the existing world and championship records were:

World record	China (CHN); Yang Yu (1:55.47); Zhu Qianwei (1:55.79); Liu Jing (1:56.09); Pang Jiaying (1:54.73)	7:42.08	Rome, Italy	30 July 2009
Competition record	China (CHN); Yang Yu (1:55.47); Zhu Qianwei (1:55.79); Liu Jing (1:56.09); Pang Jiaying (1:54.73)	7:42.08	Rome, Italy	30 July 2009

== Results ==
=== Heats ===
The heats were held at 11:15.

Rank	Heat	Lane	Name	Nationality	Time	Notes
1	1	3	Ye Shiwen (1:57.43); Shao Yiwen (1:57.69); Guo Junjun (1:58.26); Zhang Wenqing (1:59.12)	China	7:52.50	Q
2	1	4	Brittany Elmslie (1:57.70); Emma McKeon (1:58.24); Ami Matsuo (1:58.61); Alicia Coutts (1:58.14)	Australia	7:52.69	Q
3	2	4	Chelsea Chenault (1:58.95); Karlee Bispo (1:57.74); Maya Dirado (1:58.48); Jordan Mattern (1:57.86)	United States	7:53.03	Q
4	2	2	Melanie Costa (1:57.90); Patricia Castro (1:59.27); Beatriz Gómez Cortés (1:59.25); Mireia Belmonte (1:58.48)	Spain	7:54.90	Q
5	2	5	Charlotte Bonnet (1:58.31); Mylène Lazare (1:59.81); Isabelle Mabboux (2:01.14); Coralie Balmy (1:57.12)	France	7:56.38	Q
6	1	5	Samantha Cheverton (1:58.95); Barbara Jardin (1:58.43); Brittany MacLean (1:58.82); Savannah King (2:00.44)	Canada	7:56.64	Q
7	2	6	Chihiro Igarashi (1:58.55); Haruka Ueda (1:59.56); Yasuko Miyamoto (1:59.06); Aya Takano (1:59.69)	Japan	7:56.98	Q
8	2	3	Alice Mizzau (1:58.93); Martina de Memme (1:59.04); Diletta Carli (2:00.49); Federica Pellegrini (1:58.95)	Italy	7:57.41	Q
9	1	6	Viktoriya Andreyeva (1:58.40); Veronika Popova (1:58.38); Mariya Baklakova (2:00.38); Ksenia Yuskova (2:01.96)	Russia	7:59.12	
10	2	7	Jéssica Cavalheiro (2:02.72); Manuella Lyrio (2:00.64); Larissa Oliveira (2:02.94); Carolina Bilich (2:03.17)	Brazil	8:09.47	
11	1	7	Liliana Ibáñez (2:01.45); Fernanda González (2:04.42); Rita Medrano (2:04.26); Susana Escobar (2:01.43)	Mexico	8:11.56	NR
12	1	2	Quah Ting Wen (2:02.70); Lynette Lim (2:03.22); Amanda Lim (2:04.59); Mylene Ong (2:05.40)	Singapore	8:15.91	
13	2	1	Park Jin-Young (2:08.20); Hwang Seo-Jin (2:08.80); An Se-Hyeon (2:09.16); Han Na-Kyeong (2:06.82)	South Korea	8:32.98	

=== Final ===
The final was held at 19:40.

Rank	Lane	Name	Nationality	Time	Notes
1st place, gold medalist(s)	3	Katie Ledecky (1:56.32); Shannon Vreeland (1:56.97); Karlee Bispo (1:57.58); Missy Franklin (1:54.27)	United States	7:45.14	
2nd place, silver medalist(s)	5	Bronte Barratt (1:57.04); Kylie Palmer (1:56.29); Brittany Elmslie (1:56.42); Alicia Coutts (1:57.33)	Australia	7:47.08	
3rd place, bronze medalist(s)	2	Camille Muffat (1:56.45); Charlotte Bonnet (1:56.81); Mylène Lazare (1:59.15); Coralie Balmy (1:56.02)	France	7:48.43	
4	4	Ye Shiwen (1:57.17); Shao Yiwen (1:57.54); Guo Junjun (1:58.02); Qiu Yuhan (1:57.06)	China	7:49.79	
5	6	Melanie Costa (1:56.50); Patricia Castro (1:59.06); Mireia Belmonte (1:58.56); Beatriz Gómez Cortés (1:59.08)	Spain	7:53.20	NR
6	7	Samantha Cheverton (1:59.23); Barbara Jardin (1:58.19); Brittany MacLean (1:58.03); Savannah King (2:00.03)	Canada	7:55.48	
7	8	Alice Mizzau (1:59.84); Martina de Memme (1:58.60); Diletta Carli (2:00.74); Federica Pellegrini (1:58.73)	Italy	7:57.91	
8	1	Chihiro Igarashi (1:58.41); Haruka Ueda (1:59.55); Yasuko Miyamoto (1:59.81); Aya Takano (2:00.38)	Japan	7:58.15	
