= Swimming at the 2011 World Aquatics Championships – Women's 4 × 200 metre freestyle relay =

Women's 4×200 metre freestyle relay at the 2011 World Aquatics Championships
- Dates: July 28, 2011 (heats and final)
- Competitors: 71 from 17 nations
- Winning time: 7:46.14

Medalists
gold medal	Missy Franklin; Dagny Knutson; Katie Hoff; Allison Schmitt	United States
silver medal	Bronte Barratt; Blair Evans; Angie Bainbridge; Kylie Palmer	Australia
bronze medal	Chen Qian; Pang Jiaying; Liu Jing; Tang Yi	China

The women's 4×200 metre freestyle relay competition of the swimming events at the 2011 World Aquatics Championships took place July 28. The heats and final were held on July 28.

== Records ==
Prior to the competition, the existing world and championship records were as follows.

	Name	Nation	Time	Location	Date
World record Championship record	Yang Yu (1:55.47); Zhu Qianwei (1:55.79); Liu Jing (1:56.09); Pang Jiaying (1:54.73)	China	7:42.08	Rome	July 30, 2009

== Results ==
=== Heats ===
17 teams participated in 3 heats.

Rank	Heat	Lane	Nation	Swimmers	Time	Notes
1	3	4	United States	Missy Franklin (1:56.98); Katie Hoff (1:57.01); Jasmine Tosky (1:59.20); Dagny Knutson (1:57.27)	7:50.46	Q
2	1	5	Canada	Julia Wilkinson (1:58.49); Brittany MacLean (1:58.33); Samantha Cheverton (1:58.34); Barbara Jardin (1:56.89)	7:52.05	Q
3	1	4	Hungary	Ágnes Mutina (1:58.12); Evelyn Verrasztó (1:58.14); Katinka Hosszú (1:58.57); Zsuzsanna Jakabos (1:57.29)	7:52.12	Q
4	2	4	China	Chen Qian (1:58.49); Zhu Qianwei (1:58.78); Liu Jing (1:58.31); Pang Jiaying (1:57.63)	7:53.21	Q
5	3	3	Great Britain	Joanne Jackson (1:58.88); Rebecca Turner (1:59.04); Hannah Miley (1:59.05); Caitlin McClatchey (1:58.68)	7:55.65	Q
6	3	5	Australia	Angie Bainbridge (1:58.84); Blair Evans (1:57.33); Jade Neilsen (2:00.42); Bronte Barratt (1:59.09)	7:55.68	Q
7	2	5	France	Coralie Balmy (1:58.31); Ophelie-Cyrielle Etienne (2:00.62); Charlotte Bonnet (1:58.40); Camille Muffat (1:58.56)	7:55.89	Q
8	1	6	New Zealand	Lauren Boyle (1:57.74); Penelope May Marshall (2:00.68); Amaka Gessler (1:59.67); Natasha Hind (1:59.06)	7:57.15	Q, NR
9	2	3	Japan	Haruka Ueda (1:58.36); Hanae Ito (1:58.04); Yayoi Matsumoto (1:59.22); Misaki Yamaguchi (2:02.20)	7:57.82	
10	1	3	Germany	Silke Lippok (1:58.04); Lisa Vitting (1:59.14); Daniela Schreiber (1:59.84); Franziska Jansen (2:01.72)	7:58.74	
11	3	6	Russia	Veronika Popova (1:57.86); Elena Sokolova (2:00.29); Viktoriya Andreeva (2:00.21); Kira Volodina (2:01.33)	7:59.69	
12	2	6	Sweden	Ida Marko-Varga (2:00.33); Gabriella Fagundez (2:03.15); Sarah Sjöström (1:57.84); Stina Gardell (2:00.98)	8:02.30	
13	2	2	Italy	Alice Mizzau (2:01.88); Federica Pellegrini (1:58.08); Alice Nesti (2:00.40); Renata Spagnolo (2:02.33)	8:02.69	
14	1	7	Ukraine	Valeriya Podlesna (2:02.56); Darya Stepanyuk (2:00.86); Ganna Dzerkal (2:02.93); Daryna Zevyna (2:00.07)	8:06.42	NR
15	1	2	Austria	Joerdis Steinegger (1:59.58); Birgit Koschischek (2:01.77); Eva Chavez-Diaz (2:02.58); Nina Dittrich (2:00.74)	8:06.67	
16	2	7	Ireland	Sycerika McMahon (2:00.88); Melanie Nocher (2:01.28); Clare Dawson (2:02.07); Gráinne Murphy (2:03.43)	8:07.66	NR
17	3	7	Mexico	Charetzeni Susana Escobar (2:04.17); Liliana Ibanez (2:01.87); Patricia Castañeda (2:06.16); Rita Medrano (2:03.83)	8:16.03	
–	3	2	South Korea		DNS	

=== Final ===
The final was held at 19:43.

Rank	Lane	Nation	Swimmers	Time	Notes
1st place, gold medalist(s)	4	United States	Missy Franklin (1:55.06); Dagny Knutson (1:57.18); Katie Hoff (1:57.41); Allison Schmitt (1:56.49)	7:46.14	
2nd place, silver medalist(s)	7	Australia	Bronte Barratt (1:56.86); Blair Evans (1:57.69); Angie Bainbridge (1:57.36); Kylie Palmer (1:55.51)	7:47.42	
3rd place, bronze medalist(s)	6	China	Chen Qian (1:57.37); Pang Jiaying (1:56.97); Liu Jing (1:57.85); Tang Yi (1:55.47)	7:47.66	
4	1	France	Camille Muffat (1:57.83); Coralie Balmy (1:58.00); Charlotte Bonnet (1:58.83); Ophelie-Cyrielle Etienne (1:57.56)	7:52.22	
5	3	Hungary	Ágnes Mutina (1:57.89); Evelyn Verrasztó (1:58.49); Katinka Hosszú (1:58.98); Zsuzsanna Jakabos (1:57.03)	7:52.39	
6	2	Great Britain	Joanne Jackson (1:57.92); Rebecca Turner (1:58.37); Hannah Miley (1:58.74); Caitlin McClatchey (1:58.48)	7:53.51	
7	5	Canada	Barbara Jardin (1:58.27); Julia Wilkinson (1:59.37); Samantha Cheverton (1:58.45); Brittany MacLean (1:57.53)	7:53.62	
8	8	New Zealand	Lauren Boyle (1:58.10); Amaka Gessler (1:59.41); Penelope May Marshall (2:00.42); Natasha Hind (1:58.62)	7:56.55	NR
