= 2010 Pan Pacific Swimming Championships – Women's 4 × 200 metre freestyle relay =

Women's 4 × 200 metre freestyle relay at the 2010 Pan Pacific Swimming Championships
- Venue: William Woollett Jr. Aquatics Center
- Dates: August 19, 2010 (heats & finals)
- Winning time: 7:51.21

Medalists
gold medal	Dana Vollmer, Morgan Scroggy, Katie Hoff and Allison Schmitt	United States
silver medal	Blair Evans, Kylie Palmer, Katie Goldman and Meagen Nay	Australia
bronze medal	Genevieve Saumur, Julia Wilkinson, Barbara Jardin and Samantha Cheverton	Canada

The women's 4 × 200 metre freestyle relay competition at the 2010 Pan Pacific Swimming Championships took place on August 19 at the William Woollett Jr. Aquatics Center. The last champion was the United States.

This race consisted of sixteen lengths of the pool. Each of the four swimmers completed four lengths of the pool. The first swimmer had to touch the wall before the second could leave the starting block.

== Records ==
Prior to this competition, the existing world and Pan Pacific records were as follows:

World record	China (CHN); Yang Yu (1:55.47); Zhu Qianwei (1:55.79); Liu Jing (1:56.09); Pang Jiaying (1:54.73)	7:42.08	Rome, Italy	July 30, 2009
Pan Pacific Championships record	United States (USA); Natalie Coughlin (1:58.37); Lacey Nymeyer (2:00.06); Dana Vollmer (1:58.87); Katie Hoff (1:57.32)	7:54.62	Victoria, Canada	August 18, 2006

== Results ==
All times are in minutes and seconds.

KEY:	q	Fastest non-qualifiers	Q	Qualified	CR	Championships record	NR	National record	PB	Personal best	SB	Seasonal best

=== Heats ===
Heats weren't performed, as only six teams had entered.

=== Final ===
The final was held on August 19, at 20:04.

Rank	Lane	Name	Nationality	Time	Notes
1st place, gold medalist(s)	4	Dana Vollmer (1:58.05); Morgan Scroggy (1:57.89); Katie Hoff (1:58.70); Allison Schmitt (1:56.57)	United States	7:51.21	CR
2nd place, silver medalist(s)	5	Blair Evans (1:58.31); Kylie Palmer (1:58.01); Katie Goldman (1:58.19); Meagen Nay (1:58.13)	Australia	7:52.64	
3rd place, bronze medalist(s)	6	Genevieve Saumur (1:58.52); Julia Wilkinson (1:58.20); Barbara Jardin (1:58.46); Samantha Cheverton (1:59.14)	Canada	7:54.32	
4	3	Haruka Ueda (1:58.07); Hanae Ito (1:59.21); Yayoi Matsumoto (2:00.35); Risa Sekine (2:00.00)	Japan	7:57.63	
5	2	Lauren Boyle (1:58.58); Tash Hind (1:58.76); Amaka Gessler (2:02.08); Melissa Ingram (2:00.38)	New Zealand	7:59.80	
6	7	Manuella Lyrio (2:02.70); Tatiana Lemos (2:05.67); Joanna Maranhão (2:04.23); Sarah Correa (2:05.60)	Brazil	8:18.20	
