= Swimming at the 2010 Commonwealth Games – Women's 4 × 200 metre freestyle relay =

The Women's 4 × 200 metre freestyle relay event at the 2010 Commonwealth Games took place on 6 October 2010, at the SPM Swimming Pool Complex.

There were just eight teams, so all teams made the final and only one race was swum.

== Final ==
Rank	Lane	Names	Time	Notes
1st place, gold medalist(s)	4	Australia; Kylie Palmer (1:58.51); Blair Evans (1:57.47); Bronte Barratt (1:58.33); Meagen Nay (1:59.40)	7:53.71	CGR
2nd place, silver medalist(s)	6	New Zealand; Lauren Boyle (1:58.78); Penelope Marshall (1:59.96); Amaka Gessler (1:59.49); Natasha Hind (1:59.23)	7:57.46	
3rd place, bronze medalist(s)	3	England; Joanne Jackson (1:59.06); Rebecca Adlington (1:59.68); Emma Saunders (2:00.79); Sasha Matthews (1:59.08)	7:58.61	
4	5	Canada; Geneviève Saumur (1:59.37); Julia Wilkinson (1:59.80); Barbara Rojas-Jardin (1:59.84); Alexandra Komarnycky (1:59.91)	7:58.92	
5	2	Scotland; Caitlin McClatchey (2:00.47); Hannah Miley (2:00.03); Megan Gilchrist (2:02.54); Lucy Ellis (2:03.81)	8:06.85	
6	7	Wales; Danielle Stirrat (2:02.06); Alys Thomas (2:04.39); Georgia Davies (2:02.66); Jazmin Carlin (1:59.39)	8:08.50	
7	1	Northern Ireland; Melanie Nocher (2:01.51); Sycerika McMahon (2:03.46); Bethany Carson (2:04.69); Clare Dawson (2:03.36)	8:13.02	
8	8	India; Arti Ghorpade (2:13.71); Talasha Prabhu (2:12.48); Sneha Thirugnanasambandam (2:18.65); Surabhi Tipre (2:11.75)	8:56.59	
