= Karlee Bispo =

American swimmer (born 1990)

Personal information
- Full name: Karlee Delane Bispo
- National team: United States
- Born: January 14, 1990 (age 36) Modesto, California, U.S.
- Height: 5 ft 11 in (1.80 m)

Sport
- Sport: Swimming
- Strokes: Freestyle
- College team: University of Texas
- Coach: Eddie Reese
Medal record
Women's swimming
Representing the United States
World Championships (LC)
Gold medal – first place	2013 Barcelona	4×200 m freestyle

Karlee Delane Bispo (born January 14, 1990) is an American competition swimmer who specializes in middle-distance freestyle events.

Bispo graduated Downey High School. At the University of Texas where she swam from around 2008-2012, she was an 18-time All-American.

== Word Championships ==
At the 2013 World Aquatics Championships in Barcelona, Bispo won a gold medal in the 4x200-meter freestyle relay with her teammates Katie Ledecky, Shannon Vreeland, and Missy Franklin in a time of 7:45.14. Swimming the third leg, she recorded a split of 1:57.58.

On the third day of the U.S. Olympic trials in 2016, she captured fourth for the 200-meter freestyle in a preliminary heat at 1:59.29 qualifying 12th overall for the 200 freestyle semifinals. She also qualified 12th for the 200 individual medley semifinals. She did not qualify for the trial finals, however.
