= Shannon Vreeland =

American swimmer (born 1991)

Personal information
- Full name: Shannon Vreeland Patel
- National team: United States
- Born: November 15, 1991 (age 34) St. Louis, Missouri, U.S.
- Height: 6 ft 1 in (185 cm)
- Weight: 156 lb (71 kg)
- Spouse: Shaleen Patel (m. 2022)

Sport
- Sport: Swimming
- Strokes: Freestyle
- Club: Athens Bulldog Swim Club
- College team: University of Georgia
Medal record
Women's swimming
Representing the United States
Event	1st	2nd	3rd
Olympic Games	1	0	0
World Championships (LC)	4	0	1
World Championships (SC)	2	1	0
Pan Pacific Championships	1	1	1
Summer Universiade	5	1	1
Total	13	3	3
Olympic Games
Gold medal – first place	2012 London	4×200 m freestyle
World Championships (LC)
Gold medal – first place	2013 Barcelona	4×100 m freestyle
Gold medal – first place	2013 Barcelona	4×200 m freestyle
Gold medal – first place	2013 Barcelona	4×100 m medley
Gold medal – first place	2015 Kazan	4×200 m freestyle
Bronze medal – third place	2015 Kazan	4×100 m freestyle
World Championships (SC)
Gold medal – first place	2012 Istanbul	4×100 m freestyle
Gold medal – first place	2012 Istanbul	4×200 m freestyle
Silver medal – second place	2014 Doha	4×100 m freestyle
Pan Pacific Championships
Gold medal – first place	2014 Gold Coast	4×200 m freestyle
Silver medal – second place	2014 Gold Coast	4×100 m freestyle
Bronze medal – third place	2014 Gold Coast	200 m freestyle
Summer Universiade
Gold medal – first place	2015 Gwangju	100 m freestyle
Gold medal – first place	2015 Gwangju	200 m freestyle
Gold medal – first place	2015 Gwangju	4×100 m freestyle
Gold medal – first place	2015 Gwangju	4×200 m freestyle
Silver medal – second place	2011 Shenzhen	4×100 m freestyle
Bronze medal – third place	2015 Gwangju	4×100 m medley

Shannon Vreeland (born November 15, 1991) is an American former competition swimmer specializing in freestyle and Olympic gold medallist. She was a member of the 2012 United States Olympic team, and won a gold medal in the 4×200-meter freestyle relay at the 2012 London Summer Olympics. Vreeland had won a total of nineteen medals in major international competitions, including thirteen gold medals, three silver, and three bronze, spanning the Olympics, World Championships, Pan Pacific Championships, and Summer Universiade. Vreeland retired after the 2016 Olympic Trials and began attending law school at Vanderbilt University in the fall of 2016.

== Personal life ==
Vreeland was born in St. Louis, Missouri to Connie and Daniel Vreeland, and has a twin sister, Michelle. She grew up in Overland Park, Kansas, and attended Blue Valley West High School, graduating in 2010. Vreeland attended the University of Georgia, majoring in international affairs and economics, and graduated Omicron Delta Kappa and Phi Beta Kappa. In the fall of 2016, Vreeland began attending law school at Vanderbilt University, and graduated in May, 2019. After law school, she served as a legal clerk for the Eighth Circuit Court of Appeals for the Honorable Judge Duane Benton, and now works as an Environmental, Land Use, and Natural Resources associate at Alston & Bird LLP.

== Swimming career ==
=== College Swimming ===
Vreeland swam for coach Jack Bauerle's Georgia Bulldogs. She has been a member of three of the Bulldogs' NCAA national champion relay teams in the 4x200-yard relay event and one national champion relay team in the 4x100 freestyle relay, along with the NCAA team titles in 2013 and 2014. She earned NCAA All American honors 17 times throughout her college career.

=== 2012 London Olympics ===
At the 2012 United States Olympic Trials in Omaha, Nebraska, she placed fifth in the 200-meter freestyle event with a time of 1:57.90, thus qualifying as a member of the U.S. relay team in the 4×200-meter freestyle. Vreeland also placed thirteenth overall in the 100-meter freestyle race with a time of 54.87 seconds.

At the 2012 Summer Olympics in London, she earned a spot on the finals lineup for the 4×200-meter freestyle relay after swimming the fastest split in the team in the morning prelims, 1:57.04. She earned a gold medal as a member of the winning U.S. relay team in the relay, together with Missy Franklin, Dana Vollmer and Allison Schmitt. She split 1:56.85 on the third leg of the relay. The first-place Americans set a new Olympic record for the event of 7:42.92.

=== 2013 World Aquatics Championships ===
Vreeland qualified to swim 5 events at the 2013 World Aquatics Championships in Barcelona, Spain: 100-meter freestyle, 200-meter freestyle, 4x100-meter freestyle relay, 4x200-meter freestyle relay, and 4x100-meter medley relay. In her individual events, Vreeland finished 7th in the 200-meter freestyle and 8th in the 100-meter freestyle. Vreeland won three gold medals in all three relays. In the 4x100-meter freestyle relay, Vreeland won gold alongside Missy Franklin, Natalie Coughlin, and Megan Romano. The relay team narrowly out touched Australia at 3:32.31, a new American record. This was the first time the U.S. women had won the 4x100-meter freestyle relay since 2003. Vreeland split a 1:56.97 on her leg in the 4x200-meter freestyle relay, in which the U.S. team of Vreeland, Franklin, Katie Ledecky, and Karlee Bispo touched first at 7:45.14, nearly two seconds ahead of second-place team Australia. Vreeland ended her meet by swimming the freestyle leg in the morning heats of the 4x100-meter medley relay. She received a gold medal when the finals lineup of Franklin, Jessica Hardy, Vollmer, and Romano won.

=== 2014 Pan Pacific Championships ===
Vreeland won a medal of each color at the 2014 Pan Pacific Championships in Gold Coast, Australia. She earned a bronze medal in the individual 200-meter freestyle with a 1:57.38, out-touching fourth-place finisher Melanie Schlanger by one-hundredth of a second. Alongside Simone Manuel, Missy Franklin, and Abbey Weitzeil, Vreeland earned a silver medal in the 4x100-meter freestyle relay. Additionally, Vreeland earned a gold medal leading off the 4x200-meter freestyle relay. With Franklin, Leah Smith, and Katie Ledecky, the relay team touched first at 7:46.40, a new championship record.

=== 2016 Olympic Trials ===
After battling an agonizing shoulder injury for several months, Vreeland swam her final races at the 2016 United States Olympic Trials, the U.S. qualifying meet for the Rio Olympics. She swam three events, the 100-, 200-, and 400-meter freestyle events. She qualified for the semifinals for both the 100- and 200-meter freestyles, but finished 13th in the 100-meter freestyle and 15th in the 200-meter freestyle. Since she didn't qualify for the Olympic team, Vreeland decided to retire and prepare for law school in the coming fall.

== Personal best times ==
Event	Time	Location	Date
100m freestyle	53.83	Indianapolis	June 25, 2013
200m freestyle	1:56.76	Barcelona	July 28, 2013

== See also ==
- List of Olympic medalists in swimming (women)
- List of World Aquatics Championships medalists in swimming (women)
- List of University of Georgia people
- Georgia Bulldogs
