= Svetlana Egorenko =

Russian swimming coach

Svetlana Konstantinovna Egorenko
- Born: February 7, 1965 (age 61)
- Occupation: Swimming coach
- Years active: 1985–present
- Known for: Coaching Andrey Grechin, Veronika Andrusenko
- Awards: Honored Coach of Russia; Medal of the Order "For Merit to the Fatherland" II degree (2013)

Svetlana Konstantinovna Egorenko (Russian: Светлана Константиновна Егоренко; born February 7, 1965) is a Russian swimming coach. She has been a coach of the Russian national swimming team since 2006. Honored Coach of Russia.

== Biography ==
Svetlana Egorenko is an Honored Coach of Russia in swimming and a leading swimming specialist in Saint Petersburg. She is a coach and instructor at the Sports school of olympic reserve for water sports "Ekran" (Saint Petersburg), where she has worked since the late 1990s.

She holds a higher education degree in the field of physical culture and sports. Since 2006, she has been part of the coaching staff of the Russian national swimming team.

She has trained more than 40 Masters of Sport, whose achievements include victories and prize-winning places at the championships of Russia, Europe, and international competitions. Her students have been members of the junior and main national teams of Russia. Egorenko has made a significant contribution to the development of swimming in Saint Petersburg and in the national team.

== Notable students ==
- Andrey Grechin - Honored master of sports of Russia, Olympic medalist, multiple medalist at the World Championships, multiple winner and medalist at the European and Russian Championships, stages of the World Cup.
- Veronika Andrusenko - Honored master of sports of Russia, multiple medalist at the World Championships, multiple winner and medalist at the European and Russian Championships, stages of the World Cup, two-time former world record holder.

== Awards and achievements ==
- Honored Coach of Russia (2013)
- Medal of the Order "For Merit to the Fatherland" II degree (2013)

== Quote ==
Any pedagogical specialization requires love for children. Children can be small, big, but still - they are our children. It is necessary to accept them as they are, with their strengths and weaknesses. We develop strength, we work on weaknesses.
