= Baek Il-joo =

South Korean swimmer (born 1985)

Personal information
- Nationality: South Korea
- Born: 14 August 1985 (age 41) Seoul, South Korea
- Height: 1.70 m (5 ft 7 in)
- Weight: 66 kg (146 lb)

Korean name
- Hangul: 백일주
- RR: Baek Ilju
- MR: Paek Ilchu

Sport
- Sport: Swimming
- Strokes: Freestyle
- Club: Cheollabukdo Sports Council

Baek Il-joo (Korean: 백일주; born August 14, 1985, in Seoul) is a South Korean swimmer, who specializes in freestyle events.

== Swimming career ==
Baek qualified for the women's 200 m freestyle, as South Korea's oldest swimmer (aged 26), at the 2012 Summer Olympics in London, by eclipsing the FINA B-standard entry time of 2:01.24 at the Dong-A Swimming Tournament in Ulsan.

She challenged four other swimmers on the first heat at the Olympics, including two-time Olympian Natthanan Junkrajang of Thailand. Baek raced to third place by 0.77 of a second behind Switzerland's Danielle Villars with a third-slowest time of 2:04.32. Baek failed to advance into the semifinals, as she placed thirty-third overall in the preliminary heats.
