= Blair Evans =

Australian swimmer

Personal information
- Full name: Blair Catherine Evans
- National team: Australia
- Born: 3 April 1991 (age 35) Perth, Western Australia
- Height: 1.75 m (5 ft 9 in)
- Weight: 65 kg (143 lb)

Sport
- Sport: Swimming
- Strokes: Freestyle
- Club: UWA West Coast
- Coach: Will Scott
Medal record
Women's swimming
Representing Australia
Olympic Games
Silver medal – second place	2012 London	4×200 m freestyle
World Championships (LC)
Silver medal – second place	2011 Shanghai	4×200 m freestyle
World Championships (SC)
Silver medal – second place	2010 Dubai	4×200 m freestyle
Pan Pacific Championships
Silver medal – second place	2010 Irvine	4×200 m freestyle
Bronze medal – third place	2010 Irvine	200 m freestyle
Bronze medal – third place	2010 Irvine	400 m freestyle
Commonwealth Games
Gold medal – first place	2010 Delhi	4×200 m freestyle
Bronze medal – third place	2018 Gold Coast	400 m medley

Blair Catherine Evans (born 3 April 1991) is an Australian middle distance freestyle swimmer.

== Career ==
Evans made her international debut for Australia at the 2009 World Aquatics Championships where she competed in the 800-metre freestyle, after winning her first senior national title in that event in that year.

She represented Australia at the 2010 Pan Pacific Swimming Championships, where she took bronze in the 200-metre and 400-metre freestyle, and silver in the 4×200-metre freestyle.

She represented Australia at the 2010 Commonwealth Games, winning a gold medal in the 4×200-metre freestyle relay, finishing sixth in the 200-metre freestyle, finishing fifth in the 800-metre freestyle, and finishing fourth in the 400-metre individual medley.

At the 2011 World Championships, she was part of the Australian 4 x 200 m women's team that won silver.

== 2012 Summer Olympics ==
At the 2012 Summer Olympics, Evans competed in the 400-metre individual medley, but finished 13th overall in the heats (6th in her heat) with a time of 4:40:42, and did not advance to the finals, as only the top 8 were selected. Evans swam in the 4×200-metre freestyle relay qualifications heat. Although she did not swim in the final, her team came in second with a time of 7:44.41, therefore Evans won a silver medal.

== 2016 Summer Olympics ==
At the 2016 Summer Olympics, Evans placed seventh in Heat 5 of the Women's 400m Individual Medley with a time of 4:38.91. She did not win a medal during the 2016 Rio games.

At the 2018 Commonwealth Games, Evans competed in the 200 and 400 m individual medley events, winning bronze in the 400 m individual medley.

== See also ==
- List of Olympic medalists in swimming (women)
