= Meagen Nay =

Australian swimmer (born 1988)

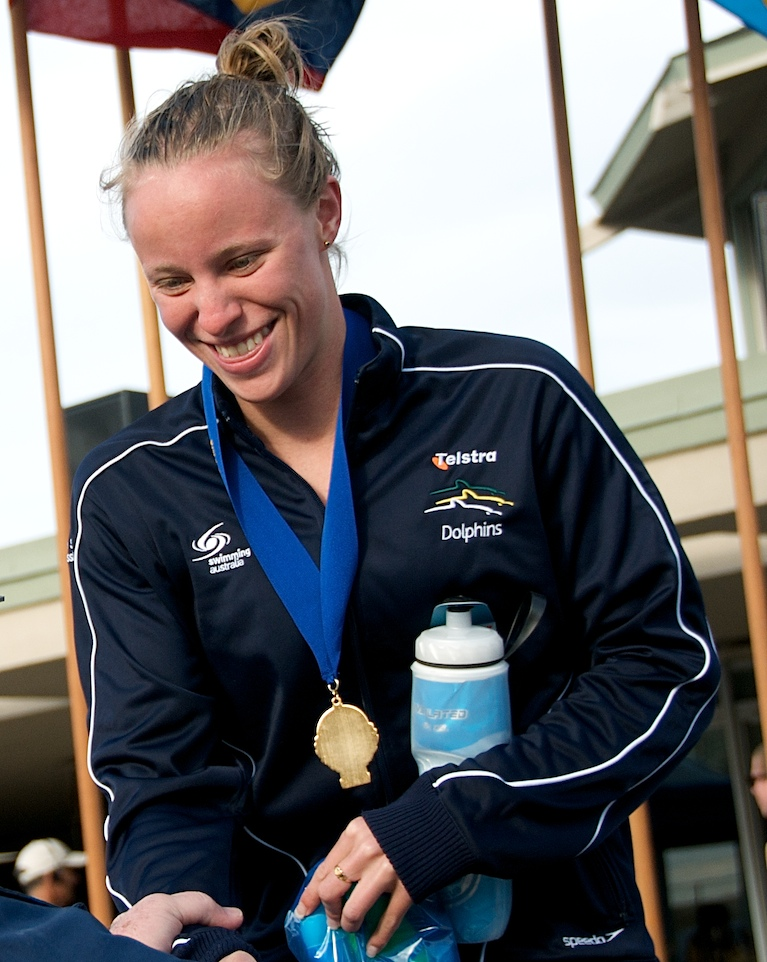

Personal information
- Full name: Meagen Marree Nay
- Nickname: "Megz"
- National team: Australia
- Born: 5 October 1988 (age 38) Gold Coast, Queensland, Australia
- Height: 1.74 m (5 ft 9 in)
- Weight: 62 kg (137 lb)

Sport
- Sport: Swimming
- Strokes: Backstroke, freestyle
- Club: St Peters Western
- Coach: Michael Bohl
Medal record
Women's swimming
Representing Australia
World Championships (LC)
| Bronze medal – third place | 2009 Rome | 4×100 m freestyle |
Pan Pacific Championships
| Silver medal – second place | 2010 Irvine | 4×200 m freestyle |
Commonwealth Games
| Gold medal – first place | 2010 Delhi | 200 m backstroke |
| Gold medal – first place | 2010 Delhi | 4×200 m freestyle |

Meagen Marree Nay (born 5 October 1988) is a competitive swimmer from Australia. She competed in the 2008 Olympic Games in the 200-metre backstroke and placed seventh in the final. Nay is a former Australian record holder in the 200-metre backstroke.

She is the daughter of Robert Nay, who competed at the 1972 Summer Olympics in Munich, Germany. However, her father did not live to see her swim, having been killed in a car crash in 1992. Her brother, Amos Nay, was killed in July 2009, also in a car crash. Nay was due to swim the 200-metre backstroke and 200-metre freestyle at the 2009 World Championships, but returned home to grieve her brother's death after swimming in the preliminaries of the 4×100-metre freestyle relay, which earned a bronze medal in the final.

At the 2010 Commonwealth Games in New Delhi, Nay won the 200-metre backstroke in a Games record of 2.07.56.

Nay trains alongside Stephanie Rice at the St Peter's Western Swimming Club under Michael Bohl.

At the 2012 Summer Olympics, she competed in the 200 m backstroke, finishing 5th in final.
