= 2006 Pan Pacific Swimming Championships – Women's 200 metre freestyle =

Women's 200 metre freestyle at the 2006 Pan Pacific Swimming Championships
- Venue: Saanich Commonwealth Place
- Dates: August 17, 2006 (heats & finals)
- Competitors: 45 from 11 nations
- Winning time: 1:58.02

Medalists
gold medal	Katie Hoff	United States
silver medal	Linda Mackenzie	Australia
bronze medal	Bronte Barratt	Australia

The women's 200 metre freestyle competition at the 2006 Pan Pacific Swimming Championships took place on August 17 at the Saanich Commonwealth Place. The last champion was Lindsay Benko of US.

This race consisted of four lengths of the pool, all in freestyle.

== Records ==
Prior to this competition, the existing world and Pan Pacific records were as follows:

World record	Franziska van Almsick (GER)	1:56.64	Berlin, Germany	August 3, 2002
Pan Pacific Championships record	Claudia Poll (CRC)	1:57.48	Fukuoka, Japan	August 10, 1997

== Results ==
All times are in minutes and seconds.

KEY:	q	Fastest non-qualifiers	Q	Qualified	CR	Championships record	NR	National record	PB	Personal best	SB	Seasonal best

=== Heats ===
The first round was held on August 17, at 10:00.

Rank	Heat	Lane	Name	Nationality	Time	Notes
1	6	4	Katie Hoff	United States	1:58.79	QA
2	5	4	Linda Mackenzie	Australia	1:59.10	QA
3	6	5	Dana Vollmer	United States	1:59.47	QA
4	4	5	Bronte Barratt	Australia	1:59.48	QA
5	5	5	Lacey Nymeyer	United States	1:59.60	QA
6	4	6	Maki Mita	Japan	1:59.70	QA
7	4	4	Amanda Weir	United States	2:00.09	QA
8	4	7	Whitney Myers	United States	2:00.11	QA
9	3	8	Kaitlin Sandeno	United States	2:00.58	QB
10	6	3	Kelly Stubbins	Australia	2:00.61	QB
11	5	3	Shayne Reese	Australia	2:00.79	QB
12	5	7	Norie Urabe	Japan	2:01.00	QB
13	5	6	Melanie Schlanger	Australia	2:01.18	QB
13	5	2	Kate Ziegler	United States	2:01.18	QB
15	6	2	Claudia Poll	Costa Rica	2:01.21	QB
16	6	1	Rachel Komisarz	United States	2:01.24	QB
17	5	8	Brittany Reimer	Canada	2:01.52	
18	4	2	Helen Norfolk	New Zealand	2:01.54	
19	4	3	Ashleigh McCleery	Australia	2:01.62	
20	6	7	Lauren Boyle	New Zealand	2:01.67	
21	6	8	Kylie Palmer	Australia	2:01.70	
22	3	6	Maya Beaudry	Canada	2:01.96	
23	6	6	Kara Lynn Joyce	United States	2:02.24	
24	3	4	Julia Wilkinson	Canada	2:02.34	
25	3	5	Melanie Bouchard	Canada	2:02.55	
26	3	3	Genevieve Saumur	Canada	2:02.57	
27	3	7	Stephanie Williams	Australia	2:02.59	
28	5	1	Haruka Ueda	Japan	2:02.73	
29	2	2	Erica Morningstar	Canada	2:02.75	
30	4	8	Yang Chin-Kuei	Chinese Taipei	2:02.91	
31	3	1	Melissa Corfe	South Africa	2:03.37	
32	2	6	Emily Wong	Canada	2:03.45	
33	2	4	Cecilia Biagioli	Argentina	2:04.39	
34	1	3	Maiko Fujino	Japan	2:04.77	
35	4	1	Alison Fitch	New Zealand	2:04.86	
36	1	5	Stephanie Horner	Canada	2:05.30	
37	2	3	Mariana Brochado	Brazil	2:05.31	
38	2	7	Kristen Bradley	Canada	2:05.61	
39	3	2	Sarah Paton	Australia	2:05.79	
40	1	4	Alexa Komarnycky	Canada	2:05.81	
41	2	5	Lee Keo-Ra	South Korea	2:06.05	
42	1	6	Jennifer Reilly	Australia	2:06.27	
43	2	8	Izumi Kato	Japan	2:07.87	
44	2	1	Nieh Pin-Chieh	Chinese Taipei	2:08.20	
45	1	2	Renata Burgos	Brazil	2:13.26	

=== B Final ===
The B final was held on August 17, at 18:29.

Rank	Lane	Name	Nationality	Time	Notes
9	5	Kelly Stubbins	Australia	2:00.21	
10	4	Lacey Nymeyer	United States	2:00.68	
11	7	Julia Wilkinson	Canada	2:01.11	
12	2	Maya Beaudry	Canada	2:02.18	
13	3	Helen Norfolk	New Zealand	2:02.80	
14	6	Lauren Boyle	New Zealand	2:03.04	
15	8	Yang Chin-Kuei	Chinese Taipei	2:03.16	
16	1	Haruka Ueda	Japan	2:03.69	

=== A Final ===
The A final was held on August 17, at 18:29.

Rank	Lane	Name	Nationality	Time	Notes
1st place, gold medalist(s)	4	Katie Hoff	United States	1:58.02	
2nd place, silver medalist(s)	5	Linda Mackenzie	Australia	1:58.26	
3rd place, bronze medalist(s)	6	Bronte Barratt	Australia	1:58.59	
4	2	Maki Mita	Japan	1:59.29	
5	3	Dana Vollmer	United States	1:59.76	
6	1	Claudia Poll	Costa Rica	1:59.83	
7	8	Brittany Reimer	Canada	2:01.39	
8	7	Norie Urabe	Japan	2:01.43	
