= Veronika Andrusenko =

Russian swimmer (born 1991)

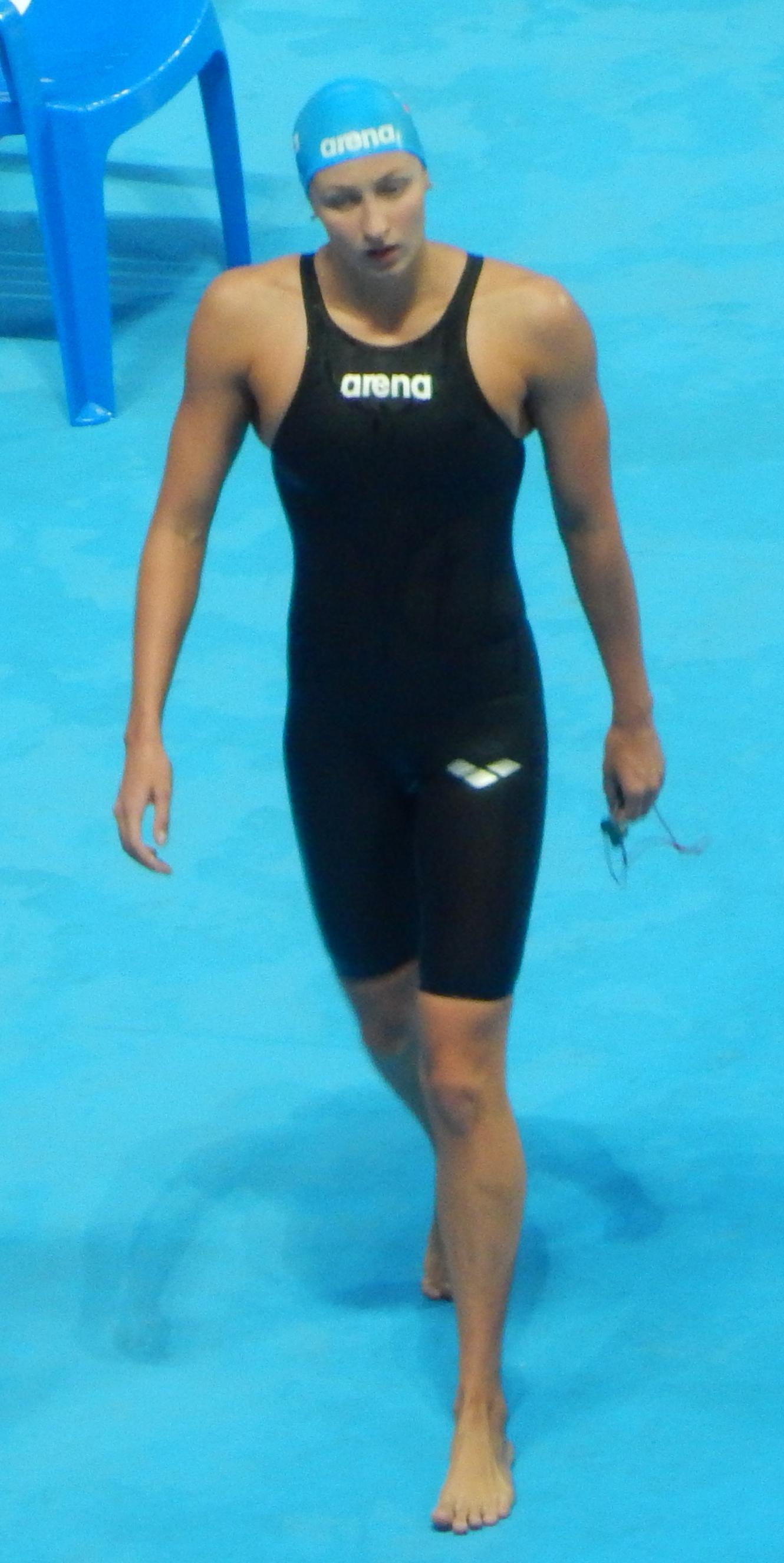

Personal information
- Full name: Veronika Andreyevna Popova
- National team: Russia
- Born: 20 January 1991 (age 35) Volgograd, Russian SFSR, USSR (now Russia)
- Height: 1.82 m (6 ft 0 in)
- Weight: 65 kg (143 lb)

Sport
- Sport: Swimming
- Strokes: Freestyle
- Club: FSO Rossiya
- Coach: Mikhail Gorelik; Svetlana Egorenko
Medal record
Women's swimming
Representing Russia
World Championships (LC)
Silver medal – second place	2017 Budapest	4×100 m medley
Bronze medal – third place	2013 Barcelona	4×100 m medley
World Championships (SC)
Silver medal – second place	2012 Istanbul	4×200 m freestyle
Silver medal – second place	2014 Doha	4×50 m mixed free
Silver medal – second place	2016 Windsor	400 m freestyle
Bronze medal – third place	2016 Windsor	4x200 m freestyle
European Championships
Silver medal – second place	2014 Berlin	4×100 m mixed freestyle
Bronze medal – third place	2014 Berlin	4×100 m mixed medley
European Championships (SC)
Gold medal – first place	2012 Chartres	100 m freestyle
Gold medal – first place	2013 Herning	4×50 m mixed freestyle
Silver medal – second place	2015 Netanya	200 m freestyle
Bronze medal – third place	2012 Chartres	200 m freestyle
Bronze medal – third place	2013 Herning	200 m freestyle
Bronze medal – third place	2013 Herning	4×50 m freestyle
Bronze medal – third place	2015 Netanya	100 m freestyle
Bronze medal – third place	2015 Netanya	4×50 m freestyle
Bronze medal – third place	2017 Copenhagen	200 m freestyle

Veronika Andreyevna Andrusenko (née Popova) (Russian: Вероника Андреевна Андрусенко (Попова); born 20 January 1991) is a Russian competitive swimmer.

At the 2012 Summer Olympics, she competed for the national team in the Women's 4 × 100 metre freestyle relay, finishing in 10th place in the heats, failing to reach the final. She also took part in the 100 m freestyle (finishing in 17th), the 200 m freestyle (finishing in 6th place), 4 × 200 m freestyle (finishing in 15th) and the 4 × 100 m medley relay (finishing in 4th).

At the 2016 Summer Olympics, she competed in the same events, finishing in 19th in the 100 m freestyle, 9th in the 200 m freestyle, 10th in the 4 × 100 m freestyle, 7th in the 4 × 200 m freestyle and 6th in the 4 × 100 m medley relay.

In 2019 she was a member of the 2019 International Swimming League representing Team Iron.

== Personal life ==
She is married to Vyacheslav Andrusenko, who is also a swimmer for Russia.

Records
Preceded by Tomaso D'Orsogna, Travis Mahoney, Cate Campbell, Bronte Campbell	Mixed 4 × 50 metres freestyle relay world record-holder 14 December 2013 – 6 December 2014; With: Sergey Fesikov, Vladimir Morozov, Rozaliya Nasretdinova	Succeeded by Josh Schneider, Matt Grevers, Madison Kennedy, Abbey Weitzeil
