= Bronte Barratt =

Australian swimmer (born 1989)

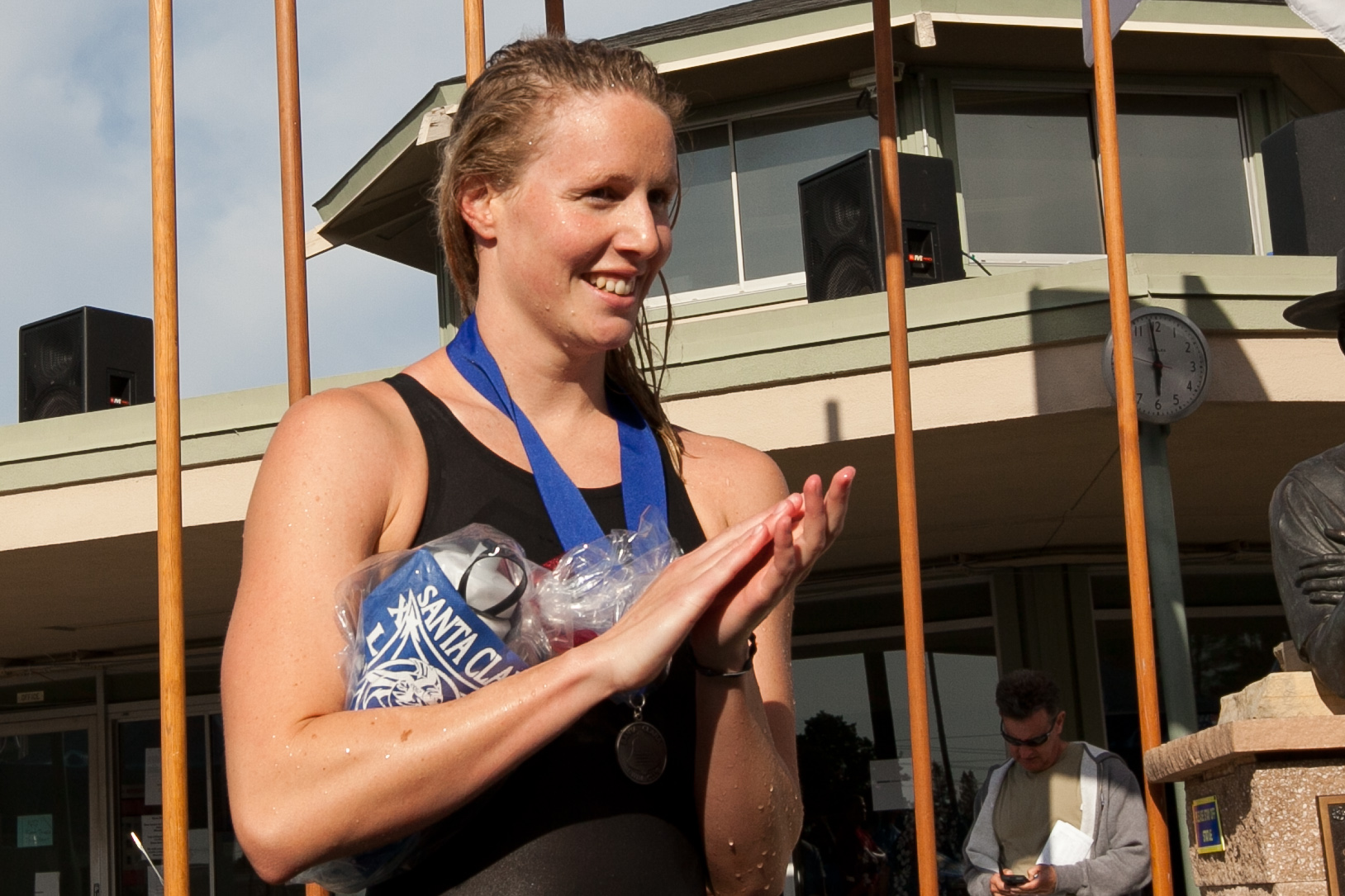
- Bronte Barratt at the 2011 Santa Clara Grand Invitational

Personal information
- Full name: Bronte Amelia Arnold Barratt
- Nickname: "Bazzy"
- National team: Australia
- Born: 8 February 1989 (age 37) Brisbane, Queensland
- Height: 171 cm (5 ft 7 in)
- Weight: 58 kg (128 lb)

Sport
- Sport: Swimming
- Strokes: Freestyle
- Club: St Peters Western
- Coach: Michael Bohl
Medal record
Women's swimming
Representing Australia
Olympic Games
Gold medal – first place	2008 Beijing	4×200 m freestyle
Silver medal – second place	2012 London	4×200 m freestyle
Silver medal – second place	2016 Rio de Janeiro	4×200 m freestyle
Bronze medal – third place	2012 London	200 m freestyle
World Championships (LC)
Gold medal – first place	2015 Kazan	4×100 m freestyle
Silver medal – second place	2005 Montreal	4×200 m freestyle
Silver medal – second place	2011 Shanghai	4×200 m freestyle
Silver medal – second place	2013 Barcelona	4×200 m freestyle
World Championships (SC)
Gold medal – first place	2006 Shanghai	4×200 m freestyle
Silver medal – second place	2006 Shanghai	400 m freestyle
Bronze medal – third place	2008 Manchester	4×200 m freestyle
Pan Pacific Championships
Silver medal – second place	2006 Victoria	4×200 m freestyle
Silver medal – second place	2014 Gold Coast	200 m freestyle
Silver medal – second place	2014 Gold Coast	4×200 m freestyle
Bronze medal – third place	2006 Victoria	200 m freestyle
Commonwealth Games
Gold medal – first place	2006 Melbourne	4×200 m freestyle
Gold medal – first place	2010 Delhi	4×200 m freestyle
Gold medal – first place	2014 Glasgow	4×200 m freestyle
Bronze medal – third place	2006 Melbourne	400 m freestyle
Bronze medal – third place	2014 Glasgow	200 m freestyle
Bronze medal – third place	2014 Glasgow	400 m freestyle

Bronte Amelia Arnold Barratt, OAM (born 8 February 1989) is an Australian retired competitive swimmer and Olympic gold medallist.

== Career ==
Born in Brisbane on 8 February 1989, Barratt was coached by John Rodgers at the Albany Creek Swim Club. At the 2006 World Short Course Championships held in Shanghai, she won a gold medal in the women's 4×200-metre freestyle relay and an individual silver medal in the 400-metre freestyle.

In 2007, she broke the oldest record in swimming for Australian women when she broke Tracey Wickham's 29-year-old record in the 400m freestyle.

Barratt competed in the 2008 Olympic Games in the women's 200-metre and 400-metre freestyle events. She was also part of the women's 4×200-metre freestyle relay team, winning gold in the final, and breaking the now-previous world record by a full six seconds. She swam the second 200 metres after Stephanie Rice, and before Kylie Palmer and Linda Mackenzie. In 2009, she received the Medal of the Order of Australia "For service to sport as a gold medallist at the Beijing 2008 Olympic Games".

Barratt won a bronze medal in the women's 200-metre freestyle at the 2012 Summer Olympics in London, and silver in the 4 × 200 m freestyle relay.

At the 2014 Commonwealth Games, she was part of the Australian 4 × 200 m freestyle relay team that won gold in a new Games record, along with winning individual bronzes in the 200 and 400 m freestyle.

At the 2016 Summer Olympics, Barratt represented Australia in both the 200m freestyle & 4 × 200 m freestyle relay, winning silver in the 4 × 200 m freestyle relay.

== See also ==
- List of Australian records in swimming
- List of Commonwealth Games records in swimming
- List of Olympic medalists in swimming (women)
- List of World Aquatics Championships medalists in swimming (women)
- List of Commonwealth Games medallists in swimming (women)
