= Allison Schmitt =

American swimmer (born 1990)

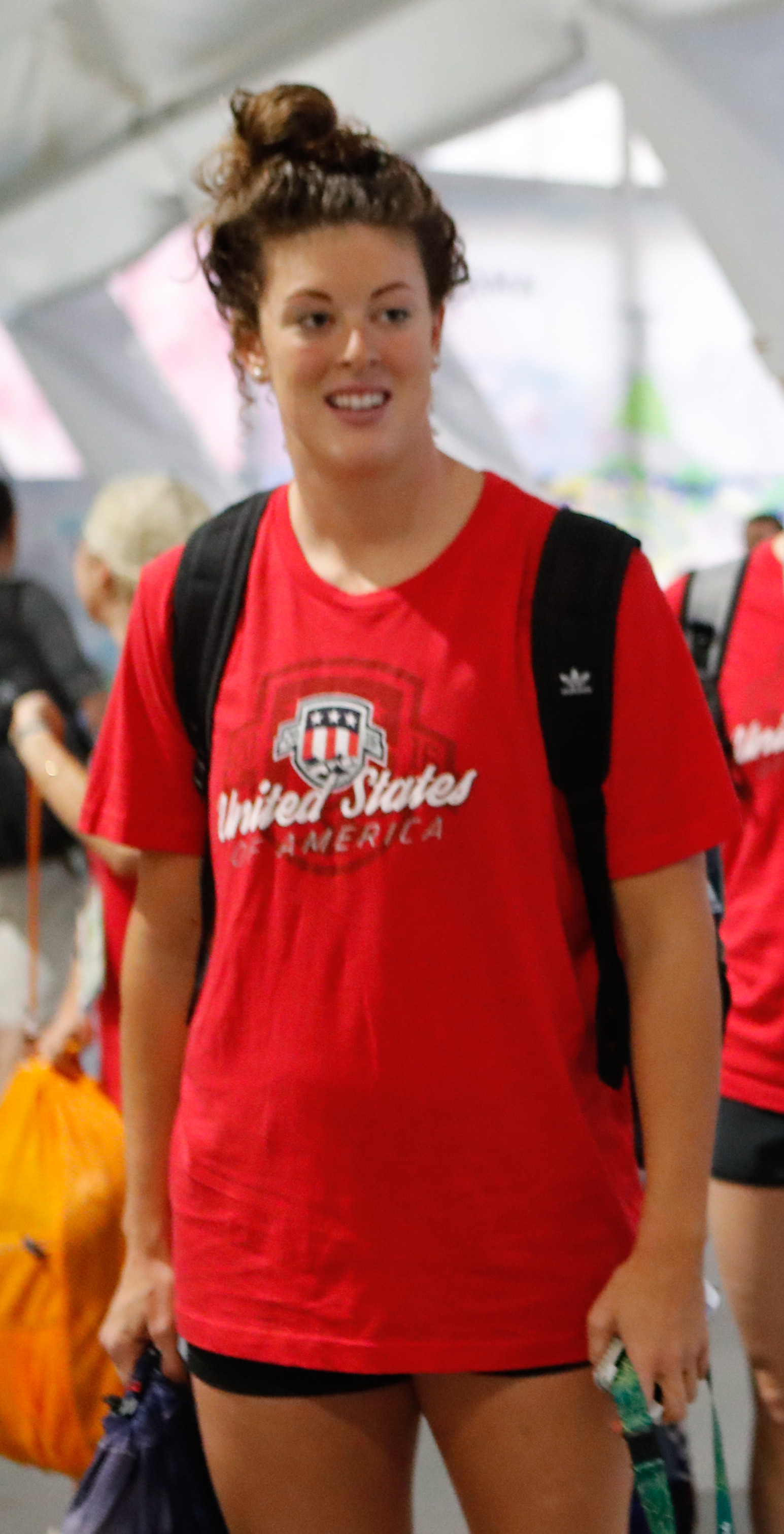
- Schmitt at the 2016 Summer Olympics

Personal information
- Full name: Allison Rodgers Schmitt
- Nicknames: "Schmitty", "Al", "Allie", "Arschmitty"
- National team: United States
- Born: June 7, 1990 (age 36) Pittsburgh, Pennsylvania, U.S.
- Height: 6 ft 1 in (185 cm)
- Weight: 165 lb (75 kg)

Sport
- Sport: Swimming
- Strokes: Freestyle
- Club: North Baltimore Aquatic Club; Plymouth Canton Cruisers; Club Wolverine
- College team: University of Georgia
Medal record
Women's swimming
Representing the United States
| Event | 1st | 2nd | 3rd |
|---|---|---|---|
| Summer Olympics | 4 | 3 | 3 |
| World Championships (LC) | 1 | 4 | 0 |
| World Championships (SC) | 3 | 0 | 0 |
| Pan Pacific Championships | 2 | 1 | 0 |
| Pan American Games | 3 | 1 | 0 |
| Total | 13 | 9 | 3 |
Olympic Games
| Gold medal – first place | 2012 London | 200 m freestyle |
| Gold medal – first place | 2012 London | 4×200 m freestyle |
| Gold medal – first place | 2012 London | 4×100 m medley |
| Gold medal – first place | 2016 Rio de Janeiro | 4×200 m freestyle |
| Silver medal – second place | 2012 London | 400 m freestyle |
| Silver medal – second place | 2016 Rio de Janeiro | 4×100 m freestyle |
| Silver medal – second place | 2020 Tokyo | 4×200 m freestyle |
| Bronze medal – third place | 2008 Beijing | 4×200 m freestyle |
| Bronze medal – third place | 2012 London | 4×100 m freestyle |
| Bronze medal – third place | 2020 Tokyo | 4×100 m freestyle |
World Championships (LC)
| Gold medal – first place | 2011 Shanghai | 4×200 m freestyle |
| Silver medal – second place | 2009 Rome | 200 m freestyle |
| Silver medal – second place | 2009 Rome | 4×200 m freestyle |
| Silver medal – second place | 2019 Gwangju | 4×100 m freestyle |
| Silver medal – second place | 2019 Gwangju | 4×200 m freestyle |
World Championships (SC)
| Gold medal – first place | 2012 Istanbul | 200 m freestyle |
| Gold medal – first place | 2012 Istanbul | 4×100 m freestyle |
| Gold medal – first place | 2012 Istanbul | 4×200 m freestyle |
Pan Pacific Championships
| Gold medal – first place | 2010 Irvine | 200 m freestyle |
| Gold medal – first place | 2010 Irvine | 4×200 m freestyle |
| Silver medal – second place | 2018 Tokyo | 4×200 m freestyle |
Pan American Games
| Gold medal – first place | 2015 Toronto | 200 m freestyle |
| Gold medal – first place | 2015 Toronto | 4×100 m medley |
| Gold medal – first place | 2015 Toronto | 4×200 m freestyle |
| Silver medal – second place | 2015 Toronto | 4×100 m freestyle |

Allison Rodgers Schmitt (born June 7, 1990) is an American competition swimmer who specializes in freestyle events. She is a four-time Olympian and a ten-time Olympic medalist.

In her Olympic debut at the 2008 Summer Olympics in Beijing, Schmitt won a bronze medal as a member of the 4×200-meter freestyle relay. Four years later, at the 2012 Summer Olympics in London, she won a total of five medals, three of them gold, in the 200-meter freestyle (in which she set a new Olympic record), in the 4×200-meter freestyle relay, and in the 4×100-meter medley relay (in which a new world record was set); and she also won a silver medal in the 400 meter freestyle, and a bronze medal in the 4 × 100 meter freestyle relay.

At the 2016 Summer Olympics Schmitt won a gold medal in the 4×200 meter freestyle relay and a silver medal in the 4×100 m freestyle relay. It was the first Olympics where she served as captain of the US Olympic swim team. Schmitt was the only second-time captain for the US Olympic swim team at the 2020 Summer Olympics. At the 2020 Olympics, Schmitt won a bronze medal in the 4×100-meter freestyle relay, swimming in the prelims of the race, and a silver medal swimming in the final of the 4x200-meter freestyle relay.

In total, Schmitt has won twenty-five medals in major international competitions: thirteen gold, nine silver, and three bronze spanning the Summer Olympics, the FINA World Championships, the Pan Pacific Championships, and the Pan American Games. She was a four-time National Collegiate Athletic Association (NCAA) national champion in the 200- and 500-yard freestyle swimming events during college, and was a member of the Georgia Bulldogs team that won the NCAA Division I Women's team title in 2013.

Schmitt was named SwimSwam's Swammy Award-winner for Female Swimmer of the Year in 2012.

== Personal life ==
Schmitt was born in Pittsburgh, Pennsylvania in 1990 to Ralph and Gail Schmitt. Raised as one of five siblings in what is still her hometown of Canton, Michigan (a suburb of Detroit), she went to Canton Charter Academy for elementary and middle school. Schmitt's father is a financial analyst and her mother is a system project manager. Schmitt considers her parents to have been the most influential and helpful people in her life. "They are so supportive of my dreams and ambitions," she said in 2008, adding, "they have given me so many opportunities to excel in life and have set a good example for me to follow."

She has an older sister named Kirsten who earned her bachelor's degree from the University of Florida, and her Juris Doctor degree from the School of Law at Washington University in St. Louis. Her older brother, Derek, swam for the University of Pittsburgh, and is an assistant coach for the Arizona State Sun Devils swim team in Tempe, Arizona. Schmitt's younger twin sisters, Kari and Sara, played in the USA Hockey national championship games in 2008 and 2009, lettered in varsity both basketball and swimming during their four years in high school, and played hockey at Ohio State University.

She started swimming at age eight, saying she followed her older sister, Kirsten, into it. "I thought about quitting," Schmitt said, "but stayed one more season and loved it." Prior to settling on swimming, she said she tried soccer, dance, basketball, volleyball, softball; and though she said she had the equipment for hockey, she decided to swim instead.

From ages 10 through 13, Schmitt swam with the Ann Arbor Swim Club (AASC) in Ann Arbor, Michigan (which, in 2006, merged into Club Wolverine). In an interview during the 2012 Summer Olympics, Josh Morgan, her then-AASC coach, said there was no indication in those years just how fast she would one day become. He said she started to show real potential, later, in the spring of her junior year in high school when she went to a 2007 Junior National Team competition. Calling it "her first real breakout swim," he said she went "from pretty fast to really fast," dropping four to five seconds off her 200-meter freestyle short course time of normally around a minute fifty-two seconds, down to around a minute forty-seven, thereby putting Schmitt in what Morgan called "elite company."

Schmitt went to Canton High School in Canton Township, Michigan, from which she graduated in the spring of 2008. During her senior year, as she continued to swim at what had, by then, become Club Wolverine on the University of Michigan campus in nearby Ann Arbor, she began training alongside Olympian Michael Phelps under the guidance of Phelps's long-time coach, Michigan Wolverines head coach Bob Bowman. Before the Summer Olympics in Beijing, having ended his tenure at University of Michigan, Bowman moved to Baltimore in anticipation of being named the head coach and CEO of the prestigious North Baltimore Aquatic Club the following September. Both Phelps and Schmitt followed, with Schmitt moving to Baltimore just after her spring 2008 high school graduation in order to train full-time with Phelps and Bowman during the weeks leading-up to the 2008 Olympics (at which Schmitt won her first Olympic medal, a bronze in the 4×200-meter freestyle relay).

After the Summer Olympics, in the fall of 2008, Schmitt moved to Athens to become a freshman at the University of Georgia, majoring in psychology, and minoring in childhood and family development. She joined coach Jack Bauerle's Georgia Bulldogs swimming and diving team, following her competition in the Summer Olympics under Bauerle, who was the women's swimming head coach. She participated in NCAA competition during her freshman, sophomore and junior years, ultimately becoming a four-time NCAA national champion by winning the 500-yard freestyle in 2009, 2010, and 2011, and the 200-yard freestyle in 2010. While at college in Athens, Schmitt also became involved in Athens Bulldog Swim Club (ABSC) competitions on the University of Georgia campus.

During her first three years at the university, she trained with Phelps and Bowman in Baltimore only during summers. However, in preparation for the 2012 Summer Olympics in London, she took the 2011–2012 school year (her senior year) off and moved to Baltimore to train full-time with Bowman and Phelps at the NBAC; which consisted of at least four hours in the pool and one hour on dry land six days a week.

After the 2012 Summer Olympics, Schmitt returned to the University of Georgia to complete her senior year of college, She was the recipient of the Honda Sports Award for Swimming and Diving, recognizing her as the outstanding college female swimmer of 2012–13. Following her return from London, Schmitt started suffering from depression, finding the increased public attention to be overwhelming. Her anguish led to bad swimming results, leading her to not qualify for various international competitions. After sharing her feelings with Phelps and Bowman in January 2015, Schmitt decided to attend therapy sessions but did not disclose her depression to her family. Once Schmitt's cousin April Bocian took her own life in May, she opted to reveal herself to her family and also make her emotional issues public, feeling it would help others in the same situation.

Schmitt wrote on the bio form for her USA Swimming organization membership that she enjoys scrapbooking, photography, playing outdoor sports and board games; and that her ultimate way to relax is watching a movie or getting a massage. Whenever she returns home to Canton she likes to visit the local youth swim clubs and high school swim teams, as a role model and mentor by swimming and talking with the young swimmers. "I love motivating these kids when they're just starting to pave their own paths in life," she said.

About it all, Schmitt has said: "I didn't start swimming competitively until I was 10 and didn't really focus on it until I was 12, yet it's such a huge part of my life and I can't imagine my life without it. It's been an amazing journey, but more than that, it's shaped who I am as a person. The best part is all the friends I have made. I believe that I literally have the best friends anyone could ever imagine hoping for, and I met almost all of them because of swimming. Taking in all the memories with these amazing people, I feel pretty lucky with the paths I have crossed, and the people I have met because of swimming."

Schmitt is a good friend of Michael Phelps.

== International swimming career ==
=== 2008 Summer Olympics ===
At the 2008 Summer Olympics, Schmitt won a bronze medal in the 4×200-meter freestyle relay with Natalie Coughlin, Caroline Burckle and Katie Hoff. Swimming the lead-off leg, Schmitt recorded a split time of 1:57.71 and the American team finished with a time of 7:46.33, an American record. Schmitt also competed in the 200-meter freestyle, but did not advance past the semifinals, finishing in ninth place with a time of 1:58.01.

=== 2009 World Aquatics Championships ===
At the 2009 World Championships in Rome, Schmitt competed in three events, the 200-meter and 400-meter freestyle, and the 4×200-meter freestyle relay. In her first event, the 400-meter freestyle, Schmitt recorded the second best time in the heats with a time of 4:02.80. However, in the final she placed 4th with a time of 4:02.51. In her second event, the 200-meter freestyle, she won a silver medal finishing behind world record holder Federica Pellegrini by 1.98 seconds. Schmitt's time of 1:54.96 was good enough for the American record. In the 4×200-meter freestyle relay, she swam the final leg in 1:54.21 as the American team placed second to China. The final time of 7:42.56 was just behind China's time of 7:42.08, but was good enough for the American record.

=== 2011 World Aquatics Championships ===
At the 2011 World Aquatics Championships in Shanghai, Schmitt won a gold medal in the 4×200-meter freestyle relay with Missy Franklin, Dagny Knutson, and Katie Hoff, with the team finishing ahead of Australia and China. As the anchor leg, Schmitt had a 1:56.49 split. Schmitt also competed in the individual 200-meter freestyle and finished sixth in the final (1:56.98).

=== 2012 Summer Olympics ===
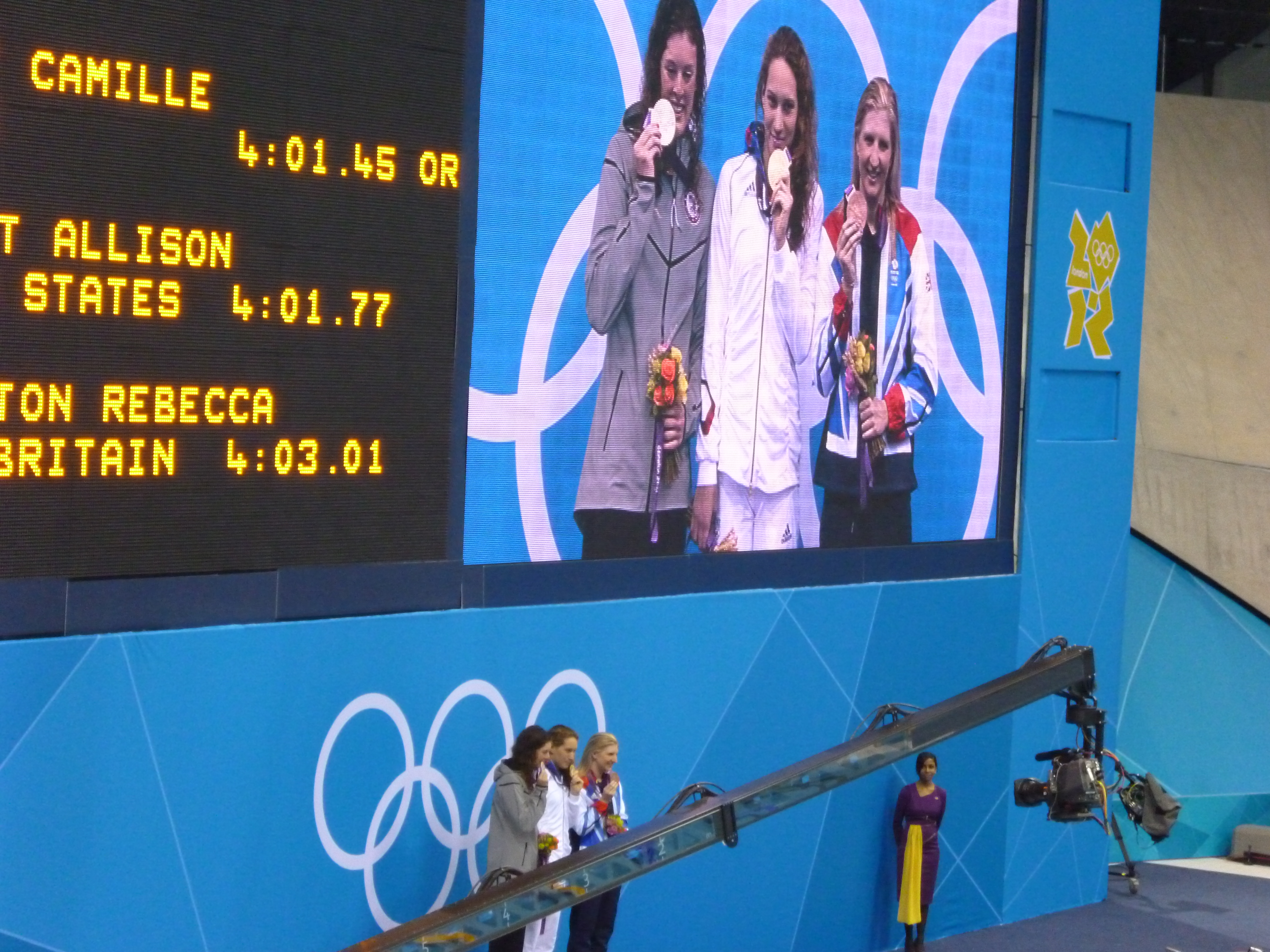
Schmitt holds up her silver medal at the 400m freestyle, alongside fellow medalists Camille Muffat and Rebecca Adlington.

2012 Olympics
| Gold medal – first place | 2012 London | 200 m freestyle |
| Gold medal – first place | 2012 London | 4x200 m freestyle relay |
| Gold medal – first place | 2012 London | 4x100 m medley relay |
| Silver medal – second place | 2012 London | 400 m freestyle |
| Bronze medal – third place | 2012 London | 4x100 m freestyle relay |

At the 2012 United States Olympic Trials in Omaha, Nebraska, the U.S. qualifying meet for the 2012 Olympics, Schmitt made the U.S. Olympic team by finishing first in the 200-meter and 400-meter freestyle, and third in the 100-meter freestyle. In the 200-meter freestyle final, Schmitt broke her own American record of 1:54.96 with a time of 1:54.40.

At the 2012 Summer Olympics in London, Schmitt won a total of five medals: three gold, one silver, and one bronze. In her first event, the 4×100-meter freestyle relay, Schmitt won bronze with Missy Franklin, Jessica Hardy and Lia Neal, with the U.S. team finishing third behind the women's relay teams from Australia and the Netherlands. Swimming the anchor leg, Schmitt had a split of 53.54 seconds and the team finished with a total time of 3:34.24, an American record. Schmitt won the first individual Olympic medal of her career, a silver, in the 400-meter freestyle, and in doing so, set the American record for the event. Her time of 4:01.77 was just 0.32 seconds behind winner Camille Muffat. In her second and last individual event, the 200-meter freestyle, Schmitt won gold while setting a new Olympic record of 1:53.61, which was also a new American record. In the race, Schmitt won by a margin of 1.97 seconds over Muffat. In the 4×200-meter freestyle relay, Schmitt earned her second gold after passing Australian Alicia Coutts and topping the field with a split of 1:54.09 as the anchor leg. Also on the winning 4×200-meter relay team were Missy Franklin, Dana Vollmer and Shannon Vreeland. In her final event, the 4×100-meter medley relay, Schmitt won gold with Missy Franklin, Rebecca Soni, and Dana Vollmer. Swimming the freestyle leg, Schmitt recorded a time of 53.25, and the American team went on to set the world record with a time of 3:52.05, bettering the Chinese-owned record of 3:52.19 set in 2009.

=== 2015 Pan American Games ===
After missing both the 2013 World Aquatics Championships and the 2014 Pan Pacific Swimming Championships, Schmitt's performance at the 2014 National Championships was enough for the 2015 Pan American Games. The Pan Am Games in Toronto marked her first international tournament since the 2012 Short-Course World Championship. Schmitt earned the gold in the 200-meter freestyle, and was a member of the teams who won the 4×200-meter freestyle and 4×100-meter medley relays, all with competition records. She also earned a silver in the 4×100-meter freestyle relay.

=== 2016 Summer Olympics ===
2016 Olympics
| Gold medal – first place | 2016 Rio | 4×200 m freestyle relay |
| Silver medal – second place | 2016 Rio | 4×100 m freestyle relay |

The 2016 United States Olympic Trials saw Schmitt finishing fourth at the 200m (1:56.72), qualifying her to the relay team. Schmitt became the ninth American female swimmer to appear in three Olympics, and only she and Elizabeth Beisel were members of each team since 2008. She was named one of the captains of the U.S. Olympic Swim Team, alongside Phelps, Beisel, Nathan Adrian, Anthony Ervin, and Cammile Adams. Schmitt earned her seventh Olympic medal by taking part in the qualifying heat of the 4 × 100 m freestyle relay, and during the finals the U.S. team won the silver. Schmitt earned her fourth gold medal, and eighth Olympic medal, by swimming in the finals of the 4 × 200 m freestyle relay with Leah Smith, Maya DiRado, and Katie Ledecky.

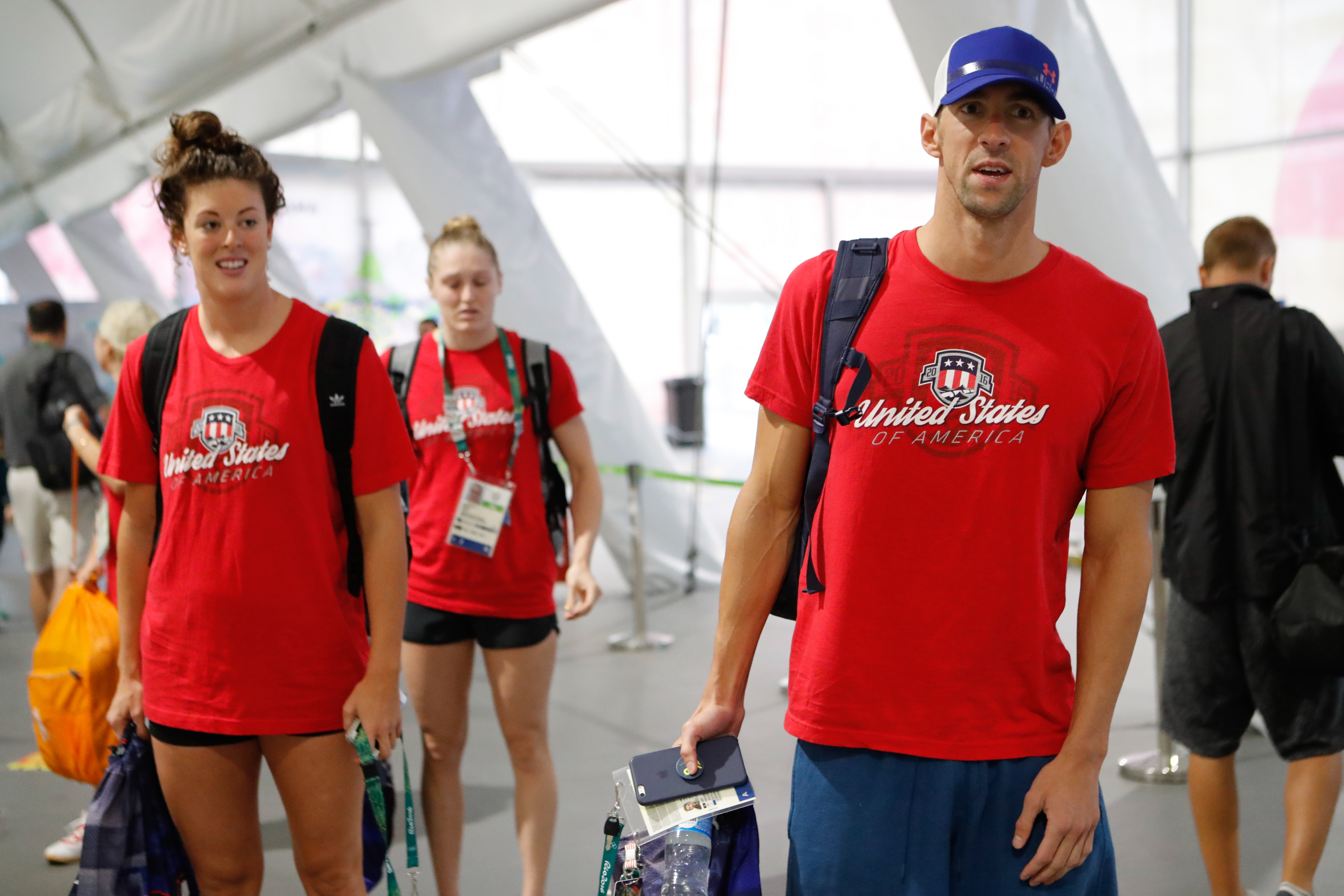
Schmitt(left) and Michael Phelps (right) in Rio 2016

=== 2018 Pan Pacific Championships ===
August 2018, Schmitt won a silver medal as part of the women's 4x200-meter relay at the 2018 Pan Pacific Swimming Championships in Tokyo, Japan swimming the first leg of the relay in a 1:58.62.

=== 2019 World Aquatics Championships ===
In July 2019, Schmitt competed at the 2019 World Aquatics Championships in Gwangju, South Korea. She won two silver medals, one in the 4x100-meter freestyle relay and one in the 4x200-meter freestyle relay.

=== 2021 ===
==== 2020 United States Olympic Trials ====
On day three of the 2020 USA Swimming Olympic Trials, the 15th of June 2021, Schmitt swam in the prelims of the 200-meter freestyle, ranking 3rd for all prelims heats with a time of 1:57.84. Later in the same day, Schmitt competed in the semifinals of the same event swimming a 1:57.53, ranking 4th, and advancing to the final. During the finals on day four, she placed 2nd in the 200m freestyle with a 1:56.79, once again securing a spot on the Olympic team. Schmitt's swim qualified her for the 2020 Summer Olympics in both the 200-meter freestyle individual event and 4x200-meter freestyle relay. This was the fourth Olympic Team Schmitt qualified for.

On day five of competition, Schmitt swam in the morning prelims of the 100-meter freestyle finishing with a time of 54.78, ranking 11th, and qualifying for the semifinals. In the semifinals, Schmitt placed 6th swimming a 54.08 and qualifying for the final. She swam a 54.12 in the final, finishing in sixth place, and giving her the potential of swimming on the 4x100-meter freestyle relay at the 2020 Summer Olympics for Team USA.

==== 2020 Summer Olympics ====
2020 Summer Olympics
| Silver medal – second place | 4x200 m freestyle relay | 7:40.73 (AM) |
| Bronze medal – third place | 4x100 m freestyle relay | 3:32.81 |

Schmitt was selected to serve as a USA swim team captain at the 2020 Summer Olympics, making it the second time she had been selected to serve as an Olympic team captain and making her the only second-time American swim team captain at the 2020 Olympics.

On day one of competition at the Olympic Games, Schmitt swam in the prelims of the 4x100-meter freestyle relay, helping the relay finish fifth overall and advance to the final. In the final, the relay finished third and Schmitt won a bronze medal for her efforts on the relay in the prelims.

In the prelims of the 200-meter freestyle on July 26, Schmitt qualified in 12th place for the semifinals with her time of 1:57.10. The next day, Schmitt finished tenth overall with a time of 1:56.87 in the semifinals and did not qualify for the final.

On day six of competition, Schmitt swam the first leg of the 4x200-meter freestyle relay in the final of the event and helped the relay set a new Americas record of 7:40.73 and win the silver medal. Schmitt's employment of a slow lead-off tactic, that is purposefully swimming a slower first leg of a relay to motivate the second, third, and fourth swimmers to split faster times than the first swimmer, caught the attention of People magazine who made her one of the headliners in an article published about the race as well as the USA Swimming Foundation who nominated her for a Golden Goggle Award for "Relay Performance of the Year" as part of the relay team.

== Personal bests ==
As of July 31, 2012.

Long course
| Event | Time | Meet | Date | Note(s) |
| 100 m freestyle | 53.80 | 2020 TYR Pro Swim Series - Des Moines | March 5, 2020 | |
| 200 m freestyle | 1:53.61 | 2012 Summer Olympics | July 31, 2012 | AM, NR |
| 400 m freestyle | 4:01.77 | 2012 Summer Olympics | July 29, 2012 | |

Legend: AM – Americas record; e – equalled existing record; NR – American record;
Records not set in finals: h – heat; sf – semifinal; r – relay 1st leg; rh – relay heat 1st leg; b – B final; † – en route to final mark; so – swim-off; tt – time trial

== Awards and honors ==
- 2012 Golden Goggle Award, Relay Performance of the Year: 4x100-meter freestyle relay
- 2012 SwimSwam Swammy Award, Swimmer of the Year (female)
- 2013 Honda Sports Award (Swimming & Diving)
- 2015 Golden Goggle Award, Perseverance Award
- 2019 Michigan Sports Hall of Fame.
- 2021 Golden Goggle Award nominee, Relay Performance of the Year: 4x200-meter freestyle relay

== See also ==
- List of multiple Olympic gold medalists
- List of Olympic medalists in swimming (women)
- List of multiple Summer Olympic medalists
- List of United States records in swimming
- List of University of Georgia people
- List of World Aquatics Championships medalists in swimming (women)
- List of world records in swimming
- World record progression 4 × 100 metres medley relay
