= Samantha Cheverton =

Canadian swimmer (born 1988)

Personal information
- Nickname: "Sam"
- Born: August 11, 1988 (age 37) Montreal, Quebec, Canada
- Height: 1.60 m (5 ft 3 in)
- Weight: 48 kg (106 lb)

Sport
- Country: Canada
- Sport: Swimming
- Strokes: Freestyle
- Club: Pointe-Claire Swim Club
- College team: Ohio State University
Medal record
Women's swimming
Representing Canada
Pan Pacific Championships
Bronze medal – third place	2010 Irvine	4×200 m freestyle
Bronze medal – third place	2014 Gold Coast	4×200 m freestyle
Commonwealth Games
Silver medal – second place	2014 Glasgow	4×200 m freestyle

Samantha Cheverton (born August 11, 1988) is a Canadian competitive swimmer. At the 2012 Summer Olympics in London, she competed for the national team in the women's 4x200-metre freestyle relay, finishing in 4th place in the final. She was also part of the 4 x 100 m freestyle and 4 x 100 m medley teams. She competed as an individual in the 200 m freestyle.

She was part of the Canadian 4 x 200 m team that won silver at the 2014 Commonwealth Games.

Cheverton attended Ohio State University in Columbus, Ohio, where she swam for the Ohio State Buckeyes swimming and diving team in National Collegiate Athletic Association (NCAA) and Big Ten Conference competition from 2008 to 2011.
