= Kylie Palmer =

Australian swimmer (born 1990)

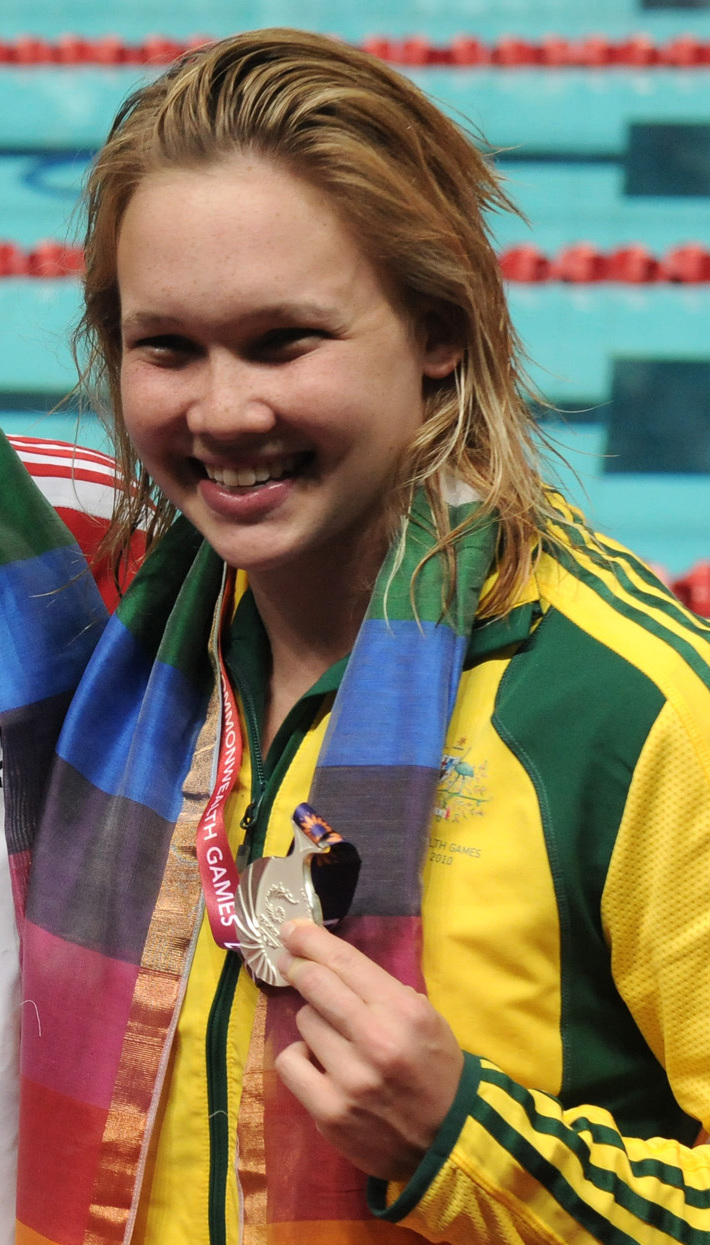
- XIX Commonwealth Games-2010 Delhi Winners of (Women `s) 400m Swimming Freestyle, Kylie Palmer of Australia (Silver)

Personal information
- Full name: Kylie Jayne Palmer
- National team: Australia
- Born: 25 February 1990 (age 36) Brisbane, Queensland
- Height: 1.72 m (5 ft 8 in)
- Weight: 68 kg (150 lb)

Sport
- Sport: Swimming
- Strokes: Freestyle
- Club: Chandler
- Coach: Vince Raleigh
Medal record
Women's swimming
Representing Australia
Olympic Games
| Gold medal – first place | 2008 Beijing | 4x200m Freestyle |
| Silver medal – second place | 2012 London | 4×200 m freestyle |
World Championships (LC)
| Silver medal – second place | 2011 Shanghai | 200 m freestyle |
| Silver medal – second place | 2011 Shanghai | 4×200 m freestyle |
| Silver medal – second place | 2013 Barcelona | 4×200 m freestyle |
World Championships (SC)
| Gold medal – first place | 2008 Manchester | 200 m freestyle |
| Gold medal – first place | 2008 Manchester | 400 m freestyle |
| Silver medal – second place | 2008 Manchester | 800 m freestyle |
| Silver medal – second place | 2010 Dubai | 4×200 m freestyle |
| Silver medal – second place | 2010 Dubai | 400 m freestyle |
| Bronze medal – third place | 2008 Manchester | 4×200 m freestyle |
| Bronze medal – third place | 2010 Dubai | 200 m freestyle |
| Bronze medal – third place | 2014 Doha | 4×200 m freestyle |
Pan Pacific Championships
| Silver medal – second place | 2010 Irvine | 4×200 m freestyle |
Commonwealth Games
| Gold medal – first place | 2010 Delhi | 200 m freestyle |
| Gold medal – first place | 2010 Delhi | 4×200 m freestyle |
| Silver medal – second place | 2010 Delhi | 400 m freestyle |

Kylie Jayne Palmer, OAM (born 25 February 1990), is an Australian distance freestyle swimmer.

She attended Grace Lutheran College, Rothwell. She was Sports Captain for her house, Pegasus and represented the school in many aquatic events.

She trained at Redcliffe Leagues Swimming Club under Ken Wood, and later Albany Creek Swim Club under John Rodgers.

At the 2007 Australian Short Course Championships she set an Australian and Commonwealth record in the 800 metres freestyle of 8:14.11.

She represented Australia at the 2006 Commonwealth Games, where she finished 5th in the 400-metre freestyle. At the 2007 Melbourne World Championships she came 8th in the 800-metre freestyle.

At the 2008 Short Course World Championships in Manchester, Palmer won 4 medals. Two titles over 200-metre and 400-metre freestyle, one silver medal over 800-metre freestyle and a bronze medal with the 4×200-metre freestyle relay.

At the 2008 Australian Swimming Championships, she won the 800-metre freestyle in a personal best time of 8:24.30, thus qualifying for the 2008 Summer Olympics. Also, by finishing 4th in the 200-metre freestyle, she qualified to swim in the relay at the games.

At the Beijing Olympics, 14 August 2008, Palmer won gold for the 4×200-metre women's relay team, with other members Stephanie Rice, Bronte Barratt and Linda MacKenzie. The Australian team overcame world superpowers USA and China to beat the world record of 7:44:31 by 5.78 seconds. Palmer was the fastest swimmer of her team, giving Australia a 3.14 second advantage.

At the 2010 Commonwealth Games, Palmer won the gold medal in the 200-metre freestyle with a time of 1:57:50.

At the 2012 Summer Olympics, she was part of the Australian 4 × 200 m freestyle team that won silver.

In April 2015, Palmer was notified that she had failed a doping test at the 2013 World Aquatics Championships in Barcelona, forcing Swimming Australia to remove her from the Australian swim team for the 2015 World Aquatics Championships in Kazan.

== See also ==
- List of Australian records in swimming
- List of Olympic medalists in swimming (women)
- List of World Aquatics Championships medalists in swimming (women)
- List of Commonwealth Games medallists in swimming (women)
- World record progression 4 × 200 metres freestyle relay

Records
| Preceded by Natalie Coughlin; Dana Vollmer; Lacey Nymeyer; Katie Hoff | Women's 4×200 metres freestyle relay world record holder (long course); 14 August 2008 – 30 July 2009; Stephanie Rice; Bronte Barratt; Kylie Palmer; Linda Mackenzie | Succeeded by Yang Yu; Zhu Qianwei; Liu Jing; Pang Jiaying |
