= Barbara Jardin =

Canadian swimmer (born 1991)

Personal information
- Born: October 22, 1991 (age 34) Montreal, Quebec, Canada
- Height: 1.68 m (5 ft 6 in)
- Weight: 59 kg (130 lb)

Sport
- Country: Canada
- Sport: Swimming
- Strokes: Freestyle
- Club: Piscines du Parc Olympique

Barbara Jardin (born October 22, 1991) is a Canadian competitive swimmer, who lives in Montreal. At the 2012 Summer Olympics in London, she finished 6th overall in the heats in the women's 200-metre freestyle, and narrowly missed qualifying for the finals in her semifinal, finishing 10th overall. She was also a member of the Canadian team that finished fourth in the final of the women's 4x200-metre freestyle relay.

Jardin is a niece of Anne Jardin-Alexander, who won two bronze medals at the 1976 Summer Olympics. She took up swimming at the age of four, and belonged to the Cote des Neiges swimming club. In 2010, she competed in the Pan Pacific Swimming Championships, Commonwealth Games and World Championships. She was named Swimming Canada's Female Sprint Freestyle Swimmer of the Year in 2011, having competed in 200 m and 400 m freestyle at the World Championships. She was diagnosed with type 1 diabetes in 2014, after a prolonged period of fatigue. Jardin retired from competitive swimming in 2016.
