= 2012 FINA World Swimming Championships (25 m) – Women's 200 metre individual medley =

Women's 200m Individual Medley at the 2012 Short Course Worlds
- Dates: 15 December (heats and final)
- Winning time: 2:04.64

Medalists
gold medal	Ye Shiwen	China
silver medal	Katinka Hosszú	Hungary
bronze medal	Hannah Miley	Great Britain

The women's 200 metre individual medley event at the 11th FINA World Swimming Championships (25m) took place 15 December 2012 at the Sinan Erdem Dome.

== Records ==
Prior to this competition, the existing world and championship records were as follows.

	Name	Nation	Time	Location	Date
World record	Julia Smit	United States	2:04.60	Manchester	19 December 2009
Championship record	Mireia Belmonte	Spain	2:05.73	Dubai	18 December 2010

The following records were established during the competition:

Date	Event	Name	Nation	Time	Record
15 December	Final	Ye Shiwen	China	2:04.64	CR

== Results ==
=== Heats ===
Rank	Heat	Lane	Name	Time	Notes
1	5	4	Katinka Hosszú (HUN)	2:07.07	Q
2	4	4	Ye Shiwen (CHN)	2:08.09	Q
3	5	5	Zsuzsanna Jakabos (HUN)	2:08.48	Q
4	3	4	Hannah Miley (GBR)	2:08.86	Q
5	3	3	Hanna Dzerkal (UKR)	2:09.41	Q
6	4	7	Madeline Dirado (USA)	2:09.52	Q
7	4	5	Sophie Allen (GBR)	2:09.94	Q
8	3	1	Melanie Margalis (USA)	2:10.42	Q
9	5	8	Miho Takahashi (JPN)	2:10.53	
10	5	2	Ellen Fullerton (AUS)	2:10.68	
11	5	1	Choi Hye-Ra (KOR)	2:11.16	
12	3	8	Alicja Tchórz (POL)	2:11.39	
13	4	6	Theresa Michalak (GER)	2:11.59	
14	3	6	Daria Belyakina (RUS)	2:11.63	
15	4	3	Wendy van der Zanden (NED)	2:11.74	
16	1	6	Qiao Qiao (CHN)	2:11.75	
17	3	7	Stefania Pirozzi (ITA)	2:11.91	
18	5	3	Emu Higuchi (JPN)	2:12.14	
19	4	1	Alessia Polieri (POL)	2:12.24	
20	5	6	Katrine Soerensen (DEN)	2:12.54	
21	4	2	Jördis Steinegger (AUT)	2:13.84	
22	3	2	Jessica Pengelly (RSA)	2:13.95	
23	4	8	Ranohon Amanova (UZB)	2:14.01	
24	3	5	Barbora Závadová (CZE)	2:14.03	
25	5	7	Karolina Szczepaniak (POL)	2:14.48	
26	5	0	Kristina Krasyukova (RUS)	2:15.38	
27	5	9	Chan Kin Lok (HKG)	2:15.70	
28	4	0	Cheng Wan-Jung (TPE)	2:15.88	
29	3	0	Gizem Bozkurt (TUR)	2:16.16	
30	2	4	Samantha Yeo (SIN)	2:16.78	NR
31	3	9	Melisa Akarsu (TUR)	2:17.83	
32	4	9	Nguyen Thi Anh Vien (VIE)	2:19.89	
33	2	7	Michelle Weber (RSA)	2:21.83	
34	2	5	Mariangel Hidalgo (CRC)	2:23.78	
35	2	0	Christine Briedenhann (NAM)	2:25.53	
36	2	3	Pooja Raghava Alva (IND)	2:30.22	
37	2	9	Nathalie Sanchez Hernandez (ESA)	2:31.12	
38	2	1	Lianna Catherine Swan (PAK)	2:31.57	
39	2	8	Anum Bandey (PAK)	2:35.23	
40	2	6	Tan Chi Yan (MAC)	2:37.77	
41	5	5	Surennyam Erdenebileg (MGL)	2:43.13	
	1	3	Danielle Atoigue (GUM)	DNS	
	1	4	Yusra Mardini (SYR)	DNS	
	2	2	Elodie Poo Cheong (MRI)	DNS	

=== Final ===
The final was held at 20:24.

Rank	Lane	Name	Nationality	Time	Notes
1st place, gold medalist(s)	5	Ye Shiwen	China	2:04.64	CR, AS
2nd place, silver medalist(s)	4	Katinka Hosszú	Hungary	2:04.72	
3rd place, bronze medalist(s)	6	Hannah Miley	Great Britain	2:07.12	
4	3	Zsuzsanna Jakabos	Hungary	2:07.36	
5	7	Madeline Dirado	United States	2:07.77	
6	8	Melanie Margalis	United States	2:08.63	
7	1	Sophie Allen	Great Britain	2:09.16	
8	2	Hanna Dzerkal	Ukraine	2:11.66	
