= 2010 FINA World Swimming Championships (25 m) – Women's 200 metre individual medley =

Women's 200m I.M. at the 2010 Short Course Worlds
- Dates: 18 December 2010
- Competitors: 38
- Winning time: 2:05.73

Medalists
gold medal	Mireia Belmonte	Spain
silver medal	Ye Shiwen	China
bronze medal	Ariana Kukors	United States

The Women's 200 Individual Medley (or "I.M.") at the 10th FINA World Swimming Championships (25m) was swum on 18 December 2010 in Dubai, United Arab Emirates. 38 swimmers swam in the preliminary heats, with the top-8 finishers advancing to the final that evening.

== Records ==
Prior to the competition, the existing world and championship records were as follows.

	Name	Nation	Time	Location	Date
World record	Julia Smit	United States	2:04.60	Manchester	19 December 2009
Championship record	Kirsty Coventry	Zimbabwe	2:06.13	Manchester 2008	12 April 2008

The following records were established during the competition:

Date	Round	Name	Nation	Time	WR	CR
18 December 2010	Final	Mireia Belmonte	Spain	2:05.73		CR

== Results ==
=== Heats ===
Rank	Heat	Lane	Name	Time	Notes
1	5	5	Ariana Kukors (USA)	2:07.67	Q
2	5	4	Evelyn Verrasztó (HUN)	2:08.19	Q
3	4	3	Ye Shiwen (CHN)	2:08.83	Q
4	4	4	Francesca Segat (ITA)	2:08.93	Q
5	1	6	Katinka Hosszú (HUN)	2:09.01	Q
6	3	3	Missy Franklin (USA)	2:09.07	Q
7	3	4	Kotuku Ngawati (AUS)	2:09.39	Q
8	5	3	Mireia Belmonte (ESP)	2:10.09	Q
9	3	5	Hannah Miley (GBR)	2:10.11	
10	4	6	Stina Gardell (SWE)	2:10.22	
11	5	6	Theresa Michalak (GER)	2:11.48	
12	5	2	Ekaterina Andreeva (RUS)	2:11.57	
13	4	2	Barbora Závadová (CZE)	2:12.40	
14	3	6	Sara Thydén (SWE)	2:12.86	
14	4	5	Daria Belyakina (RUS)	2:12.86	
16	3	7	Jessica Pengelly (RSA)	2:13.33	
17	4	1	Sarra Lajnef (TUN)	2:13.76	
18	2	5	Maiko Fujino (JPN)	2:13.87	
19	4	7	Sinead Russell (CAN)	2:14.76	
20	5	8	Katarina Listopadova (SVK)	2:15.19	
21	3	2	Emilia Pikkarainen (FIN)	2:15.28	
22	2	6	Sara El Bekri (MAR)	2:15.39	
23	4	8	Lisa Zaiser (AUT)	2:16.74	
24	5	1	Sara Nordenstam (NOR)	2:17.09	
25	5	7	Mandy Loots (RSA)	2:17.27	
26	3	1	Georgina Bardach (ARG)	2:17.30	
27	3	8	Gizem Bozkurt (TUR)	2:17.62	
28	2	4	Ranohon Amanova (UZB)	2:18.84	
29	2	2	Samantha Arévalo (ECU)	2:20.42	
30	2	7	Eliana Barrios (VEN)	2:21.65	
31	2	8	Lara Butler (CAY)	2:22.79	
32	2	3	Meagan Lim (SIN)	2:23.22	
33	2	1	Ma Cheok Mei (MAC)	2:23.66	
34	1	3	Anum Bandey (PAK)	2:37.38	
35	1	5	Cheyenne Rova (FIJ)	2:47.78	
–	1	2	Liu Jing (CHN)	DNS	
–	1	4	Elodie Poo Cheong (MRI)	DNS	
–	1	7	Ingvild Snildal (NOR)	DNS	

=== Final ===
Rank	Lane	Name	Time	Notes
1st place, gold medalist(s)	8	Mireia Belmonte (ESP)	2:05.73	CR
2nd place, silver medalist(s)	3	Ye Shiwen (CHN)	2:05.94	
3rd place, bronze medalist(s)	4	Ariana Kukors (USA)	2:06.09	
4	2	Katinka Hosszú (HUN)	2:06.88	
5	5	Evelyn Verrasztó (HUN)	2:07.81	
6	6	Francesca Segat (ITA)	2:08.38	
6	7	Missy Franklin (USA)	2:08.38	
8	1	Kotuku Ngawati (AUS)	2:09.32	
