= 2010 FINA World Swimming Championships (25 m) – Women's 400 metre individual medley =

Women's 400m I.M. at the 2010 Short Course Worlds
- Dates: 15 December 2010
- Competitors: 28
- Winning time: 4:24.21

Medalists
gold medal	Mireia Belmonte	Spain
silver medal	Ye Shiwen	China
bronze medal	Li Xuanxu	China

The Women's 400 Individual Medley (or "I.M.") at the 10th FINA World Swimming Championships (25m) was swum on 15 December 2010 in Dubai, United Arab Emirates. 28 swimmers swam in the morning preliminary heats, from which the top-8 advanced to the final that evening.

== Records ==
Prior to the competition, the existing world and championship records were as follows.

	Name	Nation	Time	Location	Date
World record	Julia Smit	United States	4:21.04	Manchester	18 December 2009
Championship record	Kirsty Coventry	Zimbabwe	4:26.52	Manchester	9 April 2008

The following records were established during the competition:

Date	Round	Name	Nation	Time	WR	CR
15 December 2010	Final	Mireia Belmonte	Spain	4:24.21		CR

== Results ==
=== Heats ===
Rank	Heat	Lane	Name	Time	Notes
1	4	5	Zsuzsanna Jakabos (HUN)	4:30.92	Q
2	4	4	Hannah Miley (GBR)	4:31.04	Q
3	2	4	Ye Shiwen (CHN)	4:31.90	Q
4	1	6	Li Xuanxu (CHN)	4:32.16	Q
5	3	4	Mireia Belmonte (ESP)	4:32.37	Q
6	2	5	Ariana Kukors (USA)	4:33.64	Q
7	4	3	Barbora Závadová (CZE)	4:33.74	Q
8	3	3	Maiko Fujino (JPN)	4:35.60	Q
9	2	6	Dagny Knutson (USA)	4:35.91	
10	3	7	Katheryn Meaklim (RSA)	4:36.93	
11	2	3	Stina Gardell (SWE)	4:37.68	
12	4	6	Jessica Pengelly (RSA)	4:39.08	
13	3	6	Sara Thydén (SWE)	4:39.58	
14	3	2	Sara Nordenstam (NOR)	4:39.84	
15	2	2	Ekaterina Andreeva (RUS)	4:42.22	
16	2	7	Sarra Lajnef (TUN)	4:45.40	
17	4	2	Cheng Wan-Jung (TPE)	4:47.55	
18	3	8	Sara El Bekri (MAR)	4:48.22	
19	4	7	Georgina Bardach (ARG)	4:50.12	
20	2	1	Patarawadee Kittiya (THA)	4:53.05	
21	4	1	Ranohon Amanova (UZB)	4:54.87	
22	3	1	Samantha Arévalo (ECU)	4:55.06	
23	1	4	Patricia Quevedo (PER)	4:58.88	
24	4	8	Meagan Lim (SIN)	5:01.08	
25	2	8	Lara Butler (CAY)	5:08.33	
26	1	5	Elodie Poo Cheong (MRI)	5:10.77	
27	1	3	Anum Bandey (PAK)	5:33.05	
–	3	5	Anja Klinar (SLO)	DSQ	

=== Final ===
Rank	Lane	Name	Time	Notes
1st place, gold medalist(s)	2	Mireia Belmonte (ESP)	4:24.21	CR
2nd place, silver medalist(s)	3	Ye Shiwen (CHN)	4:24.55	
3rd place, bronze medalist(s)	6	Li Xuanxu (CHN)	4:29.05	
4	5	Hannah Miley (GBR)	4:29.77	
5	4	Zsuzsanna Jakabos (HUN)	4:30.44	
6	7	Ariana Kukors (USA)	4:31.01	
7	1	Barbora Závadová (CZE)	4:35.01	
8	8	Maiko Fujino (JPN)	4:36.16	
