= Swimming at the 2013 World Aquatics Championships – Women's 200 metre individual medley =

Women's 200 metre individual medley at the 2013 World Aquatics Championships
- Venue: Palau Sant Jordi
- Date: July 28, 2013 (heats & semifinals); July 29, 2013 (final)
- Competitors: 43 from 35 nations
- Winning time: 2:07.92

Medalists
gold medal	Katinka Hosszú	Hungary
silver medal	Alicia Coutts	Australia
bronze medal	Mireia Belmonte	Spain

Barcelona Palau San Jordi

The women's 200 metre individual medley event in swimming at the 2013 World Aquatics Championships took place on 28–29 July at the Palau Sant Jordi in Barcelona, Spain.

== Records ==
Prior to this competition, the existing world and championship records were:

World record	Ariana Kukors (USA)	2:06.15	Rome, Italy	27 July 2009
Competition record	Ariana Kukors (USA)	2:06.15	Rome, Italy	27 July 2009

== Results ==
=== Heats ===
The heats were held at 10:45.

Rank	Heat	Lane	Name	Nationality	Time	Notes
1	5	5	Katinka Hosszú	Hungary	2:08.45	Q
2	5	4	Ye Shiwen	China	2:10.20	Q
3	5	3	Emily Seebohm	Australia	2:11.12	Q
4	3	6	Elizabeth Beisel	United States	2:11.16	Q
5	3	4	Caitlin Leverenz	United States	2:11.54	Q
6	5	2	Siobhan-Marie O'Connor	Great Britain	2:11.64	Q
7	4	4	Alicia Coutts	Australia	2:11.88	Q
8	3	5	Mireia Belmonte	Spain	2:12.11	Q
9	5	6	Kanako Watanabe	Japan	2:12.28	Q
10	4	3	Sophie Allen	Great Britain	2:12.31	Q
10	4	5	Zsuzsanna Jakabos	Hungary	2:12.31	Q
12	4	2	Miho Teramura	Japan	2:12.91	Q
13	3	3	Zhang Wenqing	China	2:13.40	Q
14	3	2	Viktoriya Andreyeva	Russia	2:13.61	Q
15	4	7	Erika Seltenreich-Hodgson	Canada	2:13.84	Q
16	4	6	Beatriz Gómez Cortés	Spain	2:13.98	Q
17	4	1	Stina Gardell	Sweden	2:14.02	
18	4	0	Sycerika McMahon	Ireland	2:14.38	
19	5	0	Sophie de Ronchi	France	2:14.57	
20	5	7	Theresa Michalak	Germany	2:14.73	
21	3	7	Lisa Zaiser	Austria	2:14.85	
22	3	1	Alexandra Wenk	Germany	2:14.90	
23	2	5	Erica Dittmer	Mexico	2:14.93	NR
24	2	6	Barbora Závadová	Czech Republic	2:14.98	
25	5	1	Stefania Pirozzi	Italy	2:14.98	
26	4	8	Joanna Melo	Brazil	2:15.00	
27	5	8	Alexa Komarnycky	Canada	2:15.08	
28	3	8	Hanna Dzerkal	Ukraine	2:16.52	
29	2	1	Marlies Ross	South Africa	2:16.94	
30	4	9	Victoria Kaminskaya	Portugal	2:17.21	NR
31	3	9	Katarína Listopadová	Slovakia	2:17.87	
32	2	2	Siow Yi Ting	Malaysia	2:17.90	
33	3	0	Eygló Ósk Gústafsdóttir	Iceland	2:18.18	
34	2	4	Cheng Wan-jung	Chinese Taipei	2:18.47	
35	5	9	Ranohon Amanova	Uzbekistan	2:18.60	
36	2	7	Zara Bailey	Jamaica	2:18.88	
37	2	3	Tanja Kylliäinen	Finland	2:20.09	
38	2	8	Samantha Yeo	Singapore	2:20.19	
39	2	9	McKayla Lightbourn	Bahamas	2:20.83	
40	2	0	Chan Kin Lok	Hong Kong	2:22.09	
41	1	6	Matelita Buadromo	Fiji	2:27.56	
42	1	4	Loreen Whitfield	American Samoa	2:28.05	
43	1	5	Elvira Hasanova	Azerbaijan	2:30.27	
44	1	3	Lianna Catherine Swan	Pakistan	2:32.61	NR

=== Semifinals ===
The semifinals were held at 18:24.

==== Semifinal 1 ====
Rank	Lane	Name	Nationality	Time	Notes
1	4	Ye Shiwen	China	2:09.12	Q
2	6	Mireia Belmonte	Spain	2:10.66	Q
3	2	Zsuzsanna Jakabos	Hungary	2:11.21	Q
4	3	Siobhan-Marie O'Connor	Great Britain	2:11.33	Q
5	5	Elizabeth Beisel	United States	2:11.69	
6	1	Viktoriya Andreyeva	Russia	2:12.67	
7	7	Miho Teramura	Japan	2:14.02	
8	8	Beatriz Gómez Cortés	Spain	2:15.11	

==== Semifinal 2 ====
Rank	Lane	Name	Nationality	Time	Notes
1	4	Katinka Hosszú	Hungary	2:08.59	Q
2	6	Alicia Coutts	Australia	2:10.06	Q
3	7	Sophie Allen	Great Britain	2:10.23	Q
4	5	Emily Seebohm	Australia	2:10.70	Q, WD
5	3	Caitlin Leverenz	United States	2:11.05	Q
6	1	Zhang Wenqing	China	2:11.34	
7	2	Kanako Watanabe	Japan	2:11.50	
8	8	Erika Seltenreich-Hodgson	Canada	2:16.12	

=== Final ===
The final was held at 19:26.

Rank	Lane	Name	Nationality	Time	Notes
1st place, gold medalist(s)	4	Katinka Hosszú	Hungary	2:07.92	
2nd place, silver medalist(s)	3	Alicia Coutts	Australia	2:09.39	
3rd place, bronze medalist(s)	2	Mireia Belmonte	Spain	2:09.45	
4	5	Ye Shiwen	China	2:10.48	
5	7	Caitlin Leverenz	United States	2:10.73	
6	1	Zsuzsanna Jakabos	Hungary	2:10.95	
7	6	Sophie Allen	Great Britain	2:11.32	
8	8	Siobhan-Marie O'Connor	Great Britain	2:12.03	
