= 2012 FINA World Swimming Championships (25 m) – Women's 400 metre individual medley =

Women's 400m Individual Medley at the 2012 Short Course Worlds
- Dates: 12 December (heats and final)
- Winning time: 4:23.14

Medalists
gold medal	Hannah Miley	Great Britain
silver medal	Ye Shiwen	China
bronze medal	Katinka Hosszú	Hungary

The women's 400 metre individual medley event at the 11th FINA World Swimming Championships (25m) took place 12 December 2012 at the Sinan Erdem Dome.

== Records ==
Prior to this competition, the existing world and championship records were as follows.

	Name	Nation	Time	Location	Date
World record	Julia Smit	United States	4:21.04	Manchester	18 December 2009
Championship record	Mireia Belmonte	Spain	4:24.21	Dubai	15 December 2010

The following records were established during the competition:

Date	Event	Name	Nation	Time	Record
12 December	Final	Hannah Miley	United Kingdom	4:23.14	CR

== Results ==
=== Heats ===
25 swimmers participated in 3 heats.

Rank	Heat	Lane	Name	Time	Notes
1	3	4	Hannah Miley (GBR)	4:28.91	Q
2	2	4	Katinka Hosszú (HUN)	4:29.22	Q
3	3	5	Ye Shiwen (CHN)	4:29.98	Q
4	1	4	Zsuzsanna Jakabos (HUN)	4:30.88	Q
5	2	5	Miho Takahashi (JPN)	4:31.71	Q
6	3	3	Emu Higuchi (JPN)	4:32.49	Q
7	1	2	Madeline Dirado (USA)	4:33.01	Q
8	1	5	Barbora Závadová (CZE)	4:34.67	Q
9	1	6	Rebecca Mann (USA)	4:34.70	
10	2	3	Jessica Pengelly (RSA)	4:37.66	
11	3	6	Ellen Fullerton (AUS)	4:37.84	
12	1	0	Qiao Qiao (CHN)	4:38.93	
13	3	7	Stefania Pirozzi (ITA)	4:40.04	
14	2	6	Kristina Krasyukova (RUS)	4:40.19	
14	2	7	Wendy van der Zanden (NED)	4:40.19	
16	3	1	Rene Warnes (RSA)	4:40.45	
17	1	3	Jördis Steinegger (AUT)	4:42.14	
18	2	8	Samantha Arévalo (ECU)	4:42.22	NR
19	3	2	Karolina Szczepaniak (POL)	4:45.45	
20	1	7	Céline Bertrand (SWE)	4:45.66	
21	1	1	Virginia Bardach (ARG)	4:50.85	
22	2	0	Marina García Urzainqui (ESP)	4:52.29	
23	3	8	Monalisa Arieswati Lorenza (INA)	5:00.97	
24	3	0	Anum Bandey (PAK)	5:24.51	
	2	1	Chan Kin Lok (HKG)	DSQ	
	1	8	Elodie Poo Cheong (MRI)	DNS	
	2	2	Anja Klinar (SLO)	DNS	

=== Final ===
The final was held at 20:16.

Rank	Lane	Name	Nationality	Time	Notes
1st place, gold medalist(s)	4	Hannah Miley	Great Britain	4:23.14	CR, ER
2nd place, silver medalist(s)	3	Ye Shiwen	China	4:23.33	
3rd place, bronze medalist(s)	5	Katinka Hosszú	Hungary	4:25.95	
4	6	Zsuzsanna Jakabos	Hungary	4:26.99	
5	1	Madeline Dirado	United States	4:28.55	
6	2	Miho Takahashi	Japan	4:31.55	
7	7	Emu Higuchi	Japan	4:35.59	
8	8	Barbora Závadová	Czech Republic	4:37.30	
