= Swimming at the 2009 World Aquatics Championships – Women's 200 metre individual medley =

The first heats of the Women's 200m Individual Medley took place on the morning of Sunday, July 26. The semifinal took place in the evening session of the same day and the final took place on the evening of the 27 July at the Foro Italico in Rome, Italy. The order of swimming in the medley was: Butterfly, backstroke, breaststroke, freestyle

== Records ==
Prior to this competition, the existing world and competition records were as follows:

World record	Stephanie Rice (AUS)	2:08.45	Beijing, China	13 August 2008
Championship record	Katie Hoff (USA)	2:10.13	Melbourne, Australia	26 March 2007

The following records were established during the competition:

Date	Round	Name	Nationality	Time	Record
26 July	Heat 7	Ariana Kukors	United States	2:08.53	CR
26 July	Semifinal 2	Ariana Kukors	United States	2:07.03	WR
27 July	Final	Ariana Kukors	United States	2:06.15	WR

== Results ==
=== Heats ===
Rank	Name	Nationality	Time	Heat	Lane	Notes
1	Ariana Kukors	United States	2:08.53	7	3	CR, AM
2	Katinka Hosszú	Hungary	2:09.12	8	3	ER
3	Stephanie Rice	Australia	2:09.64	8	4	
4	Kirsty Coventry	Zimbabwe	2:09.90	7	4	
5	Hannah Miley	United Kingdom	2:10.24	7	5	
6	Julie Hjorth-Hansen	Denmark	2:10.53	6	3	NR
7	Julia Smit	United States	2:10.94	6	4	
8	Emily Seebohm	Australia	2:11.31	7	2	
9	Camille Muffat	France	2:11.35	8	5	
10	Evelyn Verrasztó	Hungary	2:11.61	6	5	
11	Liu Jing	China	2:11.91	6	6	
12	Joanna Maranhão	Brazil	2:12.18	6	8	SA
13	Francesca Segat	Italy	2:12.52	7	6	
14	Tomoyo Fukuda	Japan	2:12.66	8	1	
15	Daria Belyakina	Russia	2:12.80	7	0	NR
16	Li Jiaxing	China	2:13.47	8	2	
17	Stina Gardell	Sweden	2:13.52	7	9	NR
18	Yana Martynova	Russia	2:13.61	6	1	
19	Gráinne Murphy	Ireland	2:13.64	5	6	NR
20	Erica Morningstar	Canada	2:13.70	7	1	
20	Erica Buratto	Italy	2:13.70	8	8	
22	Julia Wilkinson	Canada	2:13.75	7	7	
22	Mireira Belmonte	Spain	2:13.75	8	7	
24	Keri-anne Payne	United Kingdom	2:14.17	6	2	
25	Anja Klinar	Slovenia	2:14.40	6	7	
26	Katheryn Meaklim	South Africa	2:14.53	8	0	NR
27	Louise Mai Jansen	Denmark	2:14.61	6	0	
28	Hanna-Maria Seppälä	Finland	2:14.62	6	9	
29	Asami Kitagawa	Japan	2:15.53	8	6	
30	Marina Ribi	Switzerland	2:15.65	5	7	NR
31	Jessica Pengelly	South Africa	2:15.66	7	8	
32	Fanny Lecluyse	Belgium	2:15.88	4	4	NR
33	Karolina Szczepaniak	Poland	2:16.52	5	4	
34	Simona Baumrtova	Czech Republic	2:16.89	5	5	
35	Sara Nordenstam	Norway	2:16.96	8	9	
36	Siow Yi Ting	Malaysia	2:17.02	5	2	
37	Anna Kowalczyk	Poland	2:17.06	5	3	
38	Anna Khlistunova	Ukraine	2:17.23	4	2	
39	Kim Daleun	South Korea	2:17.65	5	8	
40	Anastasia Korotkov	Israel	2:17.79	4	8	
41	Sarra Lajnef	Tunisia	2:17.86	5	1	
42	Kim Hyejin	South Korea	2:17.89	4	3	
43	Natthanan Junkrajang	Thailand	2:19.38	4	6	
44	Anna-Liisa Põld	Estonia	2:19.46	4	7	NR
45	Maroua Mathlouhti	Tunisia	2:19.55	4	5	
46	Barbora Závadová	Czech Republic	2:19.87	5	0	
47	Erika Stewart	Colombia	2:20.24	5	9	
48	Ranohon Amanova	Uzbekistan	2:20.71	4	0	
49	Jonay Briedenhann	Namibia	2:23.54	3	1	NR
50	Aiste Drobovolskaite	Lithuania	2:24.35	3	2	NR
51	Coral del Mar Lopez Rosario	Puerto Rico	2:24.45	3	5	
52	Karla Toscano	Guatemala	2:25.37	3	4	
53	Maxine Heard	Zimbabwe	2:25.45	2	7	
54	Maria Coy	Guatemala	2:25.77	3	3	
55	Maida Turnadzic	Bosnia and Herzegovina	2:26.33	4	1	
56	Samantha Arevalo	Ecuador	2:26.45	3	8	
57	Koh Hui Yu	Singapore	2:26.56	2	5	
58	Nibal Yamout	Lebanon	2:27.94	2	4	
59	Chinyere Pigot	Suriname	2:28.94	3	0	
60	Simona Muccioli	San Marino	2:29.02	3	7	
61	Koh Ting Ting	Singapore	2:29.45	4	9	
62	Selma Atic	Bosnia and Herzegovina	2:29.55	3	9	
63	Christine Briedenhann	Namibia	2:31.58	2	8	
64	Sara Abdullahu	Albania	2:31.67	2	6	
65	Laura Lucia Paz Chavez	Honduras	2:31.94	2	3	
66	Shannon Austin	Seychelles	2:33.47	1	4	
67	Vo Thi Thanh Vy	Vietnam	2:36.35	3	6	
68	Diana Al Zamel	Syria	2:37.65	2	1	
69	Danielle Bernadine Findlay	Zambia	2:43.74	1	5	
70	Chuen Cheong Estelle Anais Li	Mauritius	2:45.32	2	0	
71	Sakina Ghulam	Pakistan	2:46.82	2	9	
72	Cheyenne Rova	Fiji	2:48.26	1	3	
73	Sausan Aishath	Maldives	3:07.54	1	6	
–	Rita Medrano	Mexico	DNS	1	2	
–	Rovena Marku	Albania	DNS	2	2	

=== Semifinals ===
Rank	Name	Nationality	Time	Heat	Lane	Notes
1	Ariana Kukors	United States	2:07.03	2	4	WR
2	Stephanie Rice	Australia	2:08.68	2	5	
3	Hannah Miley	United Kingdom	2:09.46	2	3	NR
4	Julie Hjorth-Hansen	Denmark	2:09.87	1	3	NR
5	Kirsty Coventry	Zimbabwe	2:09.91	1	5	
5	Evelyn Verrasztó	Hungary	2:09.91	1	2	
7	Katinka Hosszú	Hungary	2:10.01	1	4	
8	Camille Muffat	France	2:10.08	2	2	
9	Julia Smit	United States	2:10.29	2	6	
10	Liu Jing	China	2:11.05	2	7	
11	Daria Belyakina	Russia	2:11.73	2	8	NR
12	Joanna Maranhão	Brazil	2:12.12	1	7	SA
13	Francesca Segat	Italy	2:12.34	2	1	
14	Li Jiaxing	China	2:12.75	1	8	
15	Emily Seebohm	Australia	2:12.88	1	6	
16	Tomoyo Fukuda	Japan	2:13.36	1	1	

=== Finals ===
Rank	Name	Nationality	Time	Lane	Notes
1st place, gold medalist(s)	Ariana Kukors	United States	2:06.15	4	WR
2nd place, silver medalist(s)	Stephanie Rice	Australia	2:07.03	5	OC
3rd place, bronze medalist(s)	Katinka Hosszú	Hungary	2:07.46	1	ER
4	Kirsty Coventry	Zimbabwe	2:08.94	2	
5	Julie Hjorth-Hansen	Denmark	2:09.73	6	NR
6	Hannah Miley	United Kingdom	2:09.91	3	
7	Evelyn Verrasztó	Hungary	2:09.98	7	
8	Camille Muffat	France	2:10.85	8	
