= Swimming at the 2012 Summer Olympics – Women's 200 metre individual medley =

Women's 200 metre individual medley at the Games of the XXX Olympiad
- Venue: London Aquatics Centre
- Date: July 30, 2012 (heats & semifinals); July 31, 2012 (final)
- Competitors: 34 from 28 nations
- Winning time: 2:07.57 OR

Medalists
1st place, gold medalist(s)		Ye Shiwen	China
2nd place, silver medalist(s)		Alicia Coutts	Australia
3rd place, bronze medalist(s)		Caitlin Leverenz	United States

The women's 200 metre individual medley at the 2012 Summer Olympics took place on 30–31 July at the London Aquatics Centre in London, United Kingdom.

Despite allegations of doping, China's Ye Shiwen pulled away from the rest of the field to strike a medley double for the fifth straight time in Olympic history since Michelle Smith did so in 1996, Yana Klochkova in 2000 and 2004, and Australia's Stephanie Rice in 2008. Coming from third at the final turn, she opened up her lead with a superb freestyle leg to establish a new Olympic record and a sterling gold-medal time in 2:07.57. Australia's Alicia Coutts produced a striking effort to claim the silver behind the Chinese teen in a lifetime best of 2:08.15, adding it to her Olympic hardware with a full set of medals. Meanwhile, U.S. swimmer Caitlin Leverenz stormed home on the rear of a dominant breaststroke leg to take the bronze in 2:08.95.

Rice, the defending Olympic champion, finished fourth in 2:09.55, while U.S. world record holder Ariana Kukors lost her chance to climb the podium with a fifth-place time in 2:09.83. Zimbabwe's Kirsty Coventry fell short in her second attempt for an Olympic medal, earning a sixth spot in 2:11.13. Great Britain's Hannah Miley (2:11.29) and Hungary's Katinka Hosszú (2:14.19) rounded out the field.

Earlier in the semifinals, Ye threw down a fastest freestyle split of 30.59 to set an Olympic record and a textile best in 2:08.39, cutting off Rice's previous standard by six-hundredths of a second (0.06) in a since-banned high tech bodysuit.

== Records ==
Prior to this competition, the existing world and Olympic records were as follows.

World record	Ariana Kukors (USA)	2:06.15	Rome, Italy	27 July 2009
Olympic record	Stephanie Rice (AUS)	2:08.45	Beijing, China	13 August 2008

The following records were established during the competition:

Date	Event	Name	Nationality	Time	Record
July 30	Semifinal 2	Ye Shiwen	China	2:08.39	OR
July 31	Final	Ye Shiwen	China	2:07.57	OR

== Results ==
=== Heats ===
Rank	Heat	Lane	Name	Nationality	Time	Notes
1	5	4	Ye Shiwen	China	2:08.90	Q
2	5	6	Kirsty Coventry	Zimbabwe	2:10.51	Q
3	4	5	Caitlin Leverenz	United States	2:10.63	Q
4	4	3	Katinka Hosszú	Hungary	2:10.68	Q
5	4	4	Alicia Coutts	Australia	2:10.74	Q
6	3	5	Mireia Belmonte García	Spain	2:11.73	Q
7	3	4	Ariana Kukors	United States	2:11.94	Q
8	3	6	Evelyn Verrasztó	Hungary	2:12.17	Q
9	5	5	Stephanie Rice	Australia	2:12.23	Q
10	5	3	Hannah Miley	Great Britain	2:12.27	Q
11	3	2	Theresa Michalak	Germany	2:12.75	Q
12	3	1	Amit Ivry	Israel	2:13.29	Q, NR
13	3	7	Li Jiaxing	China	2:13.43	Q
14	5	2	Izumi Kato	Japan	2:13.85	Q
15	4	2	Beatriz Gómez Cortes	Spain	2:13.93	Q
16	3	8	Joanna Melo	Brazil	2:14.26	Q
17	3	3	Erica Morningstar	Canada	2:14.32	
18	2	5	Ganna Dzerkal	Ukraine	2:14.55	
19	2	4	Lisa Zaiser	Austria	2:14.56	
20	5	7	Stina Gardell	Sweden	2:14.70	
21	4	6	Sophie Allen	Great Britain	2:14.72	
22	2	7	Sycerika McMahon	Ireland	2:14.76	
23	4	7	Choi Hye-ra	South Korea	2:14.91	
24	4	1	Kathryn Meaklim	South Africa	2:15.25	
25	2	3	Ranohon Amanova	Uzbekistan	2:15.37	
26	5	1	Natalie Wiegersma	New Zealand	2:16.24	
27	2	2	Erica Dittmer	Mexico	2:16.54	NR
28	2	6	Eygló Ósk Gústafsdóttir	Iceland	2:16.81	NR
28	1	4	Katarína Listopadová	Slovakia	2:16.81	
30	2	1	Kim Daniela Pavlin	Croatia	2:17.17	
31	1	3	Cheng Wan-jung	Chinese Taipei	2:17.39	
32	4	8	Barbora Závadová	Czech Republic	2:17.54	
33	1	5	Emilia Pikkarainen	Finland	2:17.66	
34	5	8	Ekaterina Andreeva	Russia	2:17.84	

=== Semifinals ===
==== Semifinal 1 ====
Rank	Lane	Name	Nationality	Time	Notes
1	5	Katinka Hosszú	Hungary	2:10.74	Q
2	2	Hannah Miley	Great Britain	2:10.89	Q
3	4	Kirsty Coventry	Zimbabwe	2:10.93	Q
4	6	Evelyn Verrasztó	Hungary	2:11.53	
5	3	Mireia Belmonte García	Spain	2:11.54	
6	7	Amit Ivry	Israel	2:13.31	
7	1	Izumi Kato	Japan	2:14.47	
8	8	Joanna Melo	Brazil	2:14.74	

==== Semifinal 2 ====
Rank	Lane	Name	Nationality	Time	Notes
1	4	Ye Shiwen	China	2:08.39	Q, OR
2	3	Alicia Coutts	Australia	2:09.83	Q
3	5	Caitlin Leverenz	United States	2:10.06	Q
4	6	Ariana Kukors	United States	2:10.08	Q
5	2	Stephanie Rice	Australia	2:10.80	Q
6	1	Li Jiaxing	China	2:12.69	
7	7	Theresa Michalak	Germany	2:13.24	
8	8	Beatriz Gómez Cortes	Spain	2:15.12	

=== Final ===
Rank	Lane	Name	Nationality	Time	Notes
1st place, gold medalist(s)	4	Ye Shiwen	China	2:07.57	OR, AS
2nd place, silver medalist(s)	5	Alicia Coutts	Australia	2:08.15	
3rd place, bronze medalist(s)	3	Caitlin Leverenz	United States	2:08.95	
4	7	Stephanie Rice	Australia	2:09.55	
5	6	Ariana Kukors	United States	2:09.83	
6	8	Kirsty Coventry	Zimbabwe	2:11.13	
7	1	Hannah Miley	Great Britain	2:11.29	
8	2	Katinka Hosszú	Hungary	2:14.19	
