= Swimming at the 2010 Asian Games – Women's 200 metre individual medley =

Women's 200 metre individual medley at the 2010 Asian Games
- Venue: Aoti Aquatics Centre
- Date: 18 November 2010
- Competitors: 14 from 10 nations

Medalists
gold medal	Ye Shiwen	China
silver medal	Wang Qun	China
bronze medal	Choi Hye-ra	South Korea

The women's 200 metre individual medley event at the 2010 Asian Games took place on 18 November 2010 at Guangzhou Aoti Aquatics Centre.

There were 14 competitors from 10 countries who took part in this event. Two heats were held, the heat in which a swimmer competed did not formally matter for advancement, as the swimmers with the top eight times from the both field qualified for the finals.

Ye Shiwen and Wang Qun from China won the gold and silver medal, respectively, South Korean swimmer Choi Hye-ra finished with third place.

== Schedule ==
All times are China Standard Time (UTC+08:00)

Date	Time	Event
Thursday, 18 November 2010	09:12	Heats
Thursday, 18 November 2010	18:05	Final

== Records ==
Prior to this competition, the existing world, Asian and Games records were as follows.

World Record	Ariana Kukors (USA)	2:06.15	Rome, Italy	27 July 2009
Asian Record	Qi Hui (CHN)	2:08.32	Jinan, China	20 October 2009
Games Record	Qi Hui (CHN)	2:11.92	Doha, Qatar	7 December 2006

== Results ==
=== Heats ===
Rank	Heat	Athlete	Time	Notes
1	2	Ye Shiwen (CHN)	2:15.74	
2	1	Wang Qun (CHN)	2:16.41	
3	2	Cheng Wan-jung (TPE)	2:16.73	
4	2	Choi Hye-ra (KOR)	2:17.00	
5	1	Izumi Kato (JPN)	2:17.66	
6	1	Nam Yoo-sun (KOR)	2:18.11	
7	2	Maiko Fujino (JPN)	2:18.84	
8	2	Natthanan Junkrajang (THA)	2:19.83	
9	1	Ranohon Amanova (UZB)	2:20.44	
10	1	Erica Totten (PHI)	2:23.16	
11	2	Koh Hui Yu (SIN)	2:24.33	
12	1	Yvette Kong (HKG)	2:26.52	
13	1	Ma Cheok Mei (MAC)	2:27.74	
14	2	Chawiwan Khammee (THA)	2:30.65	

=== Final ===
Rank	Athlete	Time	Notes
1st place, gold medalist(s)	Ye Shiwen (CHN)	2:09.37	GR
2nd place, silver medalist(s)	Wang Qun (CHN)	2:12.02	
3rd place, bronze medalist(s)	Choi Hye-ra (KOR)	2:12.85	
4	Izumi Kato (JPN)	2:14.64	
5	Cheng Wan-jung (TPE)	2:15.84	
6	Maiko Fujino (JPN)	2:16.22	
7	Nam Yoo-sun (KOR)	2:16.85	
8	Natthanan Junkrajang (THA)	2:19.22	
