= 2010 FINA World Swimming Championships (25 m) – Women's 100 metre individual medley =

Women's 100m I.M. at the 2010 Short Course Worlds
- Dates: 16 December 2010 (heats and final); 17 December 2010 (final)
- Competitors: 66
- Winning time: 58.95

Medalists
gold medal	Ariana Kukors	United States
silver medal	Kotuku Ngawati	Australia
bronze medal	Hinkelien Schreuder	Netherlands

The Women's 100 Individual Medley (or I.M.) at the 10th FINA World Swimming Championships (25m) took place 16–17 December 2010 in Dubai, United Arab Emirates. The preliminary heats and semifinals were swum on 16 December; the final on 17 December.

66 individuals swam the event.

== Records ==
Prior to the competition, the existing world and championship records were as follows.

	Name	Nation	Time	Location	Date
World record	Hinkelien Schreuder	Netherlands	57.74	Berlin	15 November 2009
Championship record	Jenny Thompson	United States	59.30	Hong Kong	1 April 1999

The following records were established during the competition:

Date	Round	Name	Nation	Time	WR	CR
16 December 2010	Heats	Ariana Kukors	United States	59.14		CR
16 December 2010	Semifinals	Ariana Kukors	United States	58.65		CR

== Results ==
=== Heats ===
Rank	Heat	Lane	Name	Time	Notes
1	2	1	Ariana Kukors (USA)	59.14	Q, CR
2	8	4	Evelyn Verrasztó (HUN)	1:00.01	Q
2	8	5	Jane Trepp (EST)	1:00.01	Q
4	9	3	Theresa Michalak (GER)	1:00.14	Q
5	8	2	Hanna-Maria Seppälä (FIN)	1:00.15	Q
6	8	3	Sarah Sjöström (SWE)	1:00.33	Q
7	9	4	Hinkelien Schreuder (NED)	1:00.40	Q
8	2	3	Missy Franklin (USA)	1:00.46	Q
9	8	6	Liu Jing (CHN)	1:00.57	Q
10	9	6	Kotuku Ngawati (AUS)	1:00.61	Q
11	9	5	Sviatlana Khakhlova (BLR)	1:00.73	Q
12	2	6	Aleksandra Gerasimenya (BLR)	1:00.83	Q
13	9	2	Aleksandra Urbanczyk (POL)	1:01.08	Q
14	7	6	Francesca Segat (ITA)	1:01.12	Q
15	8	7	Ekaterina Andreeva (RUS)	1:01.13	Q
16	7	4	Katharina Stiberg (NOR)	1:01.37	Q
17	8	1	Julyana Kury (BRA)	1:01.55	
18	7	7	Daria Belyakina (RUS)	1:01.60	
19	9	7	Laura Letrari (ITA)	1:01.62	
20	9	8	Fabiola Molina (BRA)	1:01.66	
21	7	8	Sara Thydén (SWE)	1:01.86	
22	6	4	Hrafnhildur Lúthersdóttir (ISL)	1:01.91	
23	5	3	Ragnheiður Ragnarsdóttir (ISL)	1:01.98	
24	9	1	Emilia Pikkarainen (FIN)	1:02.00	
25	1	3	Zhao Jing (CHN)	1:02.05	
26	6	5	Lisa Zaiser (AUT)	1:02.22	
27	2	2	Leisel Jones (AUS)	1:02.33	
28	7	1	Mireia Belmonte García (ESP)	1:02.36	
29	6	2	Melanie Schweiger (SUI)	1:02.65	
30	8	8	Katarina Listopadova (SVK)	1:02.74	
31	6	3	Nina Sovinek (SLO)	1:02.87	
32	7	3	Alana Kathryn Dillette (BAH)	1:02.88	
33	5	6	Sara El Bekri (MAR)	1:02.98	
33	6	7	Mandy Loots (RSA)	1:02.98	
35	6	6	Burcu Dolunay (TUR)	1:03.16	
36	5	4	Katheryn Anne Meaklim (RSA)	1:03.19	
37	6	1	Sarra Lajnef (TUN)	1:03.20	
38	5	5	Caroline Reitshammer (AUT)	1:03.48	
39	6	8	Kong Yvette Man Yi (HKG)	1:03.80	
40	7	2	Cheng Wan-Jung (TPE)	1:03.83	
41	3	7	Alia Atkinson (JAM)	1:04.64	
42	3	8	Gizem Bozkurt (TUR)	1:05.10	
43	4	5	Lara Butler (CAY)	1:05.44	
44	5	2	Ma Cheok Mei (MAC)	1:05.80	
45	3	1	Eliana Barrios (VEN)	1:06.60	
46	1	4	Farida Osman (EGY)	1:07.52	
47	4	3	Karen Torrez (BOL)	1:07.57	NR
48	5	8	Magdalene Briedenhann (NAM)	1:08.10	
49	5	1	Micaela Cloete (NAM)	1:08.36	
50	5	7	Melinda Sue Micallef (MLT)	1:08.55	
51	4	4	Sara Hyajna (JOR)	1:09.99	
52	4	2	Tan Chi Yan (MAC)	1:10.46	
53	4	6	Davina Mangion (MLT)	1:10.55	
54	4	7	Dalia Torrez (NCA)	1:10.64	
55	2	5	Tieri Erasito (FIJ)	1:13.49	
56	3	5	Anum Bandey (PAK)	1:13.65	
57	2	4	Zonia Caravantes (GUA)	1:13.70	
58	4	8	Cheyenne Rova (FIJ)	1:13.83	
59	4	1	Estellah Fils Rabetsara (MAD)	1:13.96	
60	3	3	Anham Salyani (KEN)	1:15.07	
61	3	2	Rachael Tonjor (NGR)	1:15.60	
62	3	4	Sonia Cege (KEN)	1:17.76	
63	3	6	Ann-Marie Hepler (MHL)	1:20.56	
64	1	5	Britany van Lange (GUY)	1:20.98	
65	2	7	Grace Kimball (NMI)	1:21.40	
-	7	5	Ingvild Snildal (NOR)	DNS	

=== Semifinals ===
Semifinal 1

Rank	Lane	Name	Time	Notes
1	2	Kotuku Ngawati (AUS)	59.18	Q
2	6	Missy Franklin (USA)	59.67	Q
3	4	Evelyn Verrasztó (HUN)	59.86	Q
4	5	Theresa Michalak (GER)	59.87	Q
5	1	Francesca Segat (ITA)	1:00.44	
6	7	Aleksandra Gerasimenya (BLR)	1:00.79	
7	3	Sarah Sjöström (SWE)	1:01.12	
8	8	Katharina Stiberg (NOR)	1:02.87	

Semifinal 2

Rank	Lane	Name	Time	Notes
1	4	Ariana Kukors (USA)	58.65	Q, CR
2	2	Liu Jing (CHN)	59.36	Q
3	6	Hinkelien Schreuder (NED)	59.63	Q
4	5	Jane Trepp (EST)	59.77	Q
5	3	Hanna-Maria Seppälä (FIN)	1:00.49	
6	1	Aleksandra Urbanczyk (POL)	1:00.85	
7	7	Sviatlana Khakhlova (BLR)	1:00.96	
8	8	Ekaterina Andreeva (RUS)	1:01.86	

=== Final ===
Rank	Lane	Name	Time	Notes
1st place, gold medalist(s)	4	Ariana Kukors (USA)	58.95	
2nd place, silver medalist(s)	5	Kotuku Ngawati (AUS)	59.27	
3rd place, bronze medalist(s)	3	Hinkelien Schreuder (NED)	59.53	
4	2	Jane Trepp (EST)	59.85	
5	1	Theresa Michalak (GER)	59.97	
6	7	Evelyn Verrasztó (HUN)	1:00.19	
7	6	Missy Franklin (USA)	1:00.75	
8	8	Francesca Segat (ITA)	1:01.29	
