= Swimming at the 2012 European Aquatics Championships – Women's 400 metre individual medley =

Women's 400 metre individual medley at the 2012 European Aquatics Championships
- Dates: May 21, 2012 (heats and final)
- Competitors: 19 from 15 nations
- Winning time: 4:33.76

Medalists
gold medal	Katinka Hosszú	Hungary
silver medal	Zsuzsanna Jakabos	Hungary
bronze medal	Barbora Závadová	Czech Republic

The women's 400 metre individual medley competition of the swimming events at the 2012 European Aquatics Championships took place May 21. The heats and final took place on May 21.

== Records ==
Prior to the competition, the existing world, European and championship records were as follows.

	Name	Nation	Time	Location	Date
World record	Stephanie Rice	Australia	4:29.45	Beijing	August 10, 2008
European record	Katinka Hosszú	Hungary	4:30.31	Rome	August 2, 2009
Championship record	Hannah Miley	Great Britain	4:33.09	Budapest	August 9, 2010

== Results ==
=== Heats ===
19 swimmers participated in 3 heats.

Rank	Heat	Lane	Name	Nationality	Time	Notes
1	1	5	Stina Gardell	Sweden	4:39.48	Q, NR
2	3	4	Katinka Hosszú	Hungary	4:40.55	Q
3	2	4	Barbora Závadová	Czech Republic	4:40.85	Q
4	1	4	Zsuzsanna Jakabos	Hungary	4:41.31	Q
5	2	5	Anja Klinar	Slovenia	4:41.82	Q
6	3	3	Stefania Pirozzi	Italy	4:46.74	Q
7	1	3	Alessia Polieri	Italy	4:48.23	Q
8	3	5	Lara Grangeon	France	4:49.31	Q
9	3	7	Noora Laukkanen	Finland	4:50.08	
10	2	6	Sara Nordenstam	Norway	4:50.09	
11	2	3	Jördis Steinegger	Austria	4:50.94	
12	2	2	Iryna Glavnyk	Ukraine	4:52.31	
13	3	2	Kristina Kochetkova	Russia	4:52.83	
14	1	2	Karolina Szczepaniak	Poland	4:53.45	
15	1	6	Kristina Krasyukova	Russia	4:55.28	
16	2	7	Nuala Murphy	Ireland	4:58.05	
17	1	7	Johanna Gerda Gustafsdottir	Iceland	5:00.99	
18	3	1	Neza Marcun	Slovenia	5:04.00	
	3	6	Beatriz Gómez Cortés	Spain	DNF	

=== Final ===
The final was held at 17:31.

Rank	Lane	Name	Nationality	Time	Notes
1st place, gold medalist(s)	5	Katinka Hosszú	Hungary	4:33.76	
2nd place, silver medalist(s)	6	Zsuzsanna Jakabos	Hungary	4:35.68	
3rd place, bronze medalist(s)	3	Barbora Závadová	Czech Republic	4:38.07	
4	4	Stina Gardell	Sweden	4:38.46	NR
5	2	Anja Klinar	Slovenia	4:42.00	
6	7	Stefania Pirozzi	Italy	4:42.72	
7	1	Alessia Polieri	Italy	4:48.72	
8	8	Lara Grangeon	France	4:53.98	
