= Swimming at the 2012 Summer Olympics – Women's 400 metre individual medley =

Women's 400 metre individual medley at the Games of the XXX Olympiad
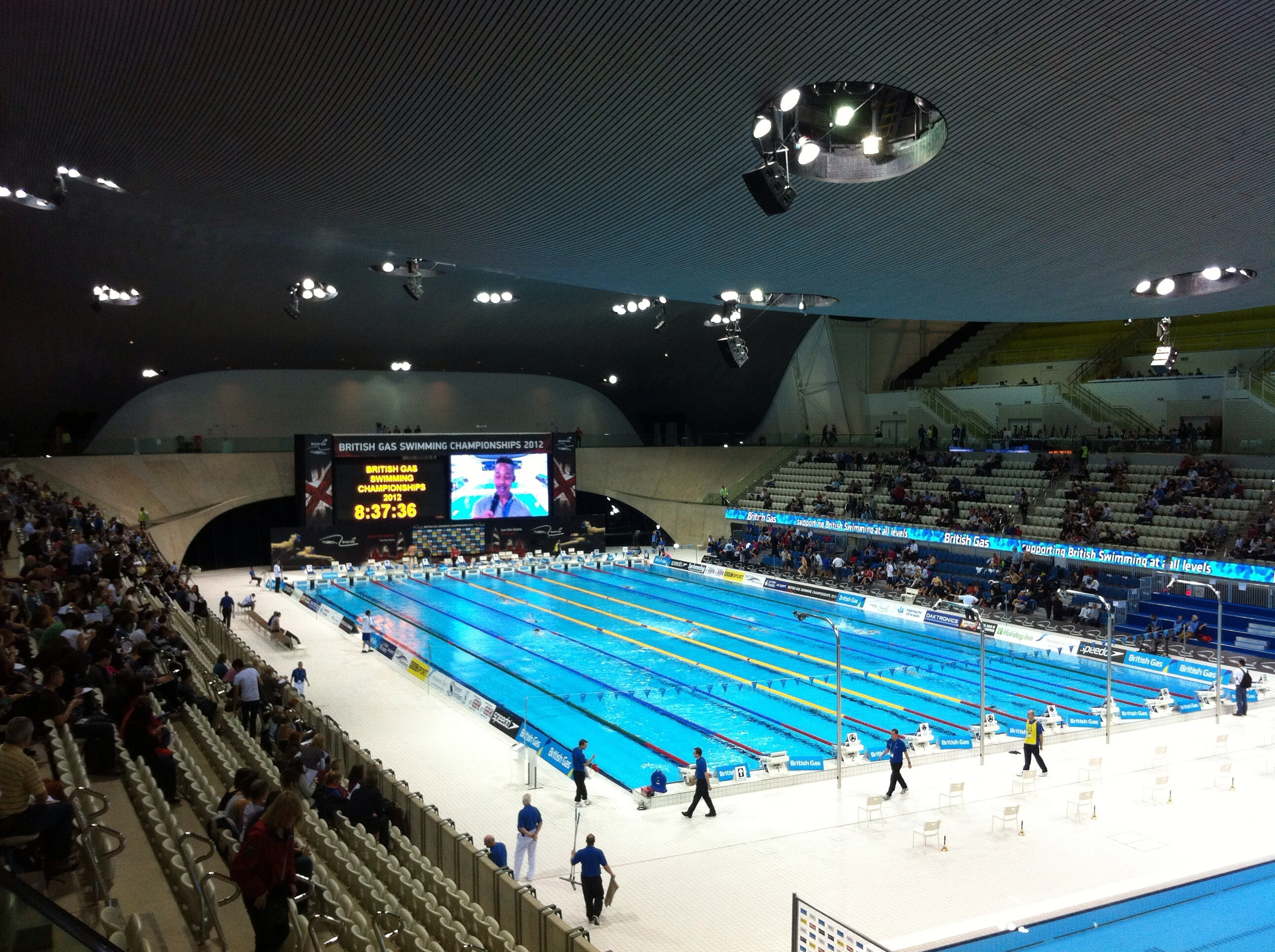
- A photograph of the Aquatics centre during the British Championships in March 2012.
- Venue: London Aquatics Centre
- Date: July 28, 2012 (heats & final)
- Competitors: 36 from 29 nations
- Winning time: 4:28.43 WR

Medalists
1st place, gold medalist(s)		Ye Shiwen	China
2nd place, silver medalist(s)		Elizabeth Beisel	United States
3rd place, bronze medalist(s)		Li Xuanxu	China

The women's 400 metre individual medley event at the 2012 Summer Olympics took place on 28 July at the London Aquatics Centre in London, United Kingdom.

At only 16 years of age, China's Ye Shiwen blasted a new world record to capture the Olympic title in the event. She trailed behind American teenager Elizabeth Beisel more than halfway through the race, before pulling away with a superb freestyle leg to bring home the Olympic gold medal and the world record in a sterling time of 4:28.43. Her spectacular swim also demolished the previous standard from Australia's Stephanie Rice in Beijing four years earlier by more than a second. Meanwhile, Beisel enjoyed the race with a powerful lead on the breaststroke leg, but felt satisfied to claim the silver in 4:31.27. Ye's teammate Li Xuanxu stormed home on the final stretch to grab a bronze in 4:32.91, edging out Hungary's early leader Katinka Hosszú (4:33.49) by more than half a second (0.50).

Great Britain's home favorite Hannah Miley finished fifth in 4:34.17, while Rice, the defending Olympic champion, matched United States' Caitlin Leverenz with an unexpected sixth-place time in 4:35.49. Spain's Mireia Belmonte García rounded out the final roster in 4:35.62.

== Records ==
Prior to this competition, the existing world and Olympic records were as follows.

World record	Stephanie Rice (AUS)	4:29.45	Beijing, China	10 August 2008	
Olympic record	Stephanie Rice (AUS)	4:29.45	Beijing, China	10 August 2008	–

The following records were established during the competition:

Date	Round	Name	Nationality	Time	Record
July 28	Final	Ye Shiwen	China	4:28.43	WR

== Results ==
=== Heats ===
Rank	Heat	Lane	Name	Nationality	Time	Notes
1	5	4	Elizabeth Beisel	United States	4:31.68	Q
2	3	5	Ye Shiwen	China	4:31.73	Q
3	3	4	Katinka Hosszú	Hungary	4:33.77	Q
4	5	5	Li Xuanxu	China	4:34.28	Q
5	5	3	Mireia Belmonte García	Spain	4:34.70	Q
6	4	4	Hannah Miley	Great Britain	4:34.98	Q
7	4	5	Stephanie Rice	Australia	4:35.76	Q
8	4	3	Caitlin Leverenz	United States	4:36.09	Q
9	3	3	Zsuzsanna Jakabos	Hungary	4:37.37	
10	5	1	Anja Klinar	Slovenia	4:38.20	
11	5	2	Aimee Willmott	Great Britain	4:38.87	
12	4	6	Miyu Otsuka	Japan	4:39.13	
13	5	6	Blair Evans	Australia	4:40.42	
14	4	7	Stina Gardell	Sweden	4:41.33	
15	3	6	Barbora Zavádová	Czech Republic	4:41.84	
16	4	2	Kathryn Meaklim	South Africa	4:43.46	
17	2	5	Kim Seo-yeong	South Korea	4:43.99	
18	5	7	Lara Grangeon	France	4:44.28	
19	3	8	Natalie Wiegersma	New Zealand	4:44.78	
20	3	2	Miho Takahashi	Japan	4:45.10	
21	2	4	Stephanie Horner	Canada	4:45.49	
22	4	1	Stefania Pirozzi	Italy	4:45.61	
23	4	8	Jördis Steinegger	Austria	4:45.80	
24	3	7	Yana Martynova	Russia	4:45.94	
25	3	1	Claudia Dasca Romeu	Spain	4:46.80	
26	2	7	Ganna Dzerkal	Ukraine	4:48.19	
27	2	6	Andreina Pinto	Venezuela	4:48.64	
28	1	3	Nguyễn Thị Ánh Viên	Vietnam	4:50.32	
29	1	4	Susana Escobar	Mexico	4:50.57	
30	2	8	Sara Nordenstam	Norway	4:51.28	
31	2	1	Karolina Szczepaniak	Poland	4:52.50	
32	2	2	Sara El Bekri	Morocco	4:53.21	
33	1	5	Noora Laukkanen	Finland	4:53.54	
34	2	3	Georgina Bardach	Argentina	4:57.31	
35	1	6	Anum Bandey	Pakistan	5:34.64	NR
	5	8	Joanna Melo	Brazil	DNS	

=== Final ===
Rank	Lane	Name	Nationality	Time	Notes
1st place, gold medalist(s)	5	Ye Shiwen	China	4:28.43	WR
2nd place, silver medalist(s)	4	Elizabeth Beisel	United States	4:31.27	
3rd place, bronze medalist(s)	6	Li Xuanxu	China	4:32.91	
4	3	Katinka Hosszú	Hungary	4:33.49	
5	7	Hannah Miley	Great Britain	4:34.17	
6	1	Stephanie Rice	Australia	4:35.49	
6	8	Caitlin Leverenz	United States	4:35.49	
8	2	Mireia Belmonte García	Spain	4:35.62	
