= 2010 Pan Pacific Swimming Championships – Women's 200 metre individual medley =

Women's 200 metre individual medley at the 2010 Pan Pacific Swimming Championships
- Venue: William Woollett Jr. Aquatics Center
- Dates: August 21, 2010 (heats & finals)
- Competitors: 27 from 7 nations
- Winning time: 2:09.93

Medalists
gold medal	Emily Seebohm	Australia
silver medal	Ariana Kukors	United States
bronze medal	Caitlin Leverenz	United States

The women's 200 metre individual medley competition at the 2010 Pan Pacific Swimming Championships took place on August 21 at the William Woollett Jr. Aquatics Center. The last champion was Whitney Myers of US.

This race consisted of four lengths of the pool, one each in backstroke, breaststroke, butterfly and freestyle swimming.

== Records ==
Prior to this competition, the existing world and Pan Pacific records were as follows:

World record	Ariana Kukors (USA)	2:06.15	Rome, Italy	July 27, 2009
Pan Pacific Championships record	Whitney Myers (USA)	2:10.11	Victoria, Canada	August 20, 2006

== Results ==
All times are in minutes and seconds.

KEY:	q	Fastest non-qualifiers	Q	Qualified	CR	Championships record	NR	National record	PB	Personal best	SB	Seasonal best

=== Heats ===
The first round was held on August 21, at 10:00.

Rank	Heat	Lane	Name	Nationality	Time	Notes
1	4	4	Ariana Kukors	United States	2:11.44	QA
2	2	4	Caitlin Leverenz	United States	2:11.62	QA
3	3	5	Morgan Scroggy	United States	2:11.87	QA
4	3	3	Elizabeth Beisel	United States	2:12.13	QA
5	4	7	Julia Wilkinson	Canada	2:12.15	QA
6	4	3	Alicia Coutts	Australia	2:12.66	QA
7	4	2	Erica Morningstar	Canada	2:12.80	QA
8	3	4	Emily Seebohm	Australia	2:12.82	QA
9	2	6	Elizabeth Pelton	United States	2:13.04	QB
10	3	6	Katie Hoff	United States	2:13.21	QB
11	4	6	Natalie Wiegersma	New Zealand	2:14.60	QB
12	3	2	Izumi Kato	Japan	2:14.99	QB
13	4	5	Tomoyo Fukuda	Japan	2:15.26	QB
14	2	2	Teresa Crippen	United States	2:15.49	QB
15	2	5	Missy Franklin	United States	2:15.55	QB
16	4	1	Kathleen Hersey	United States	2:16.50	QB
17	2	3	Joanna Maranhão	Brazil	2:17.75	
18	3	7	Miho Takahashi	Japan	2:18.15	
19	2	7	Sinead Russell	Canada	2:18.74	
20	3	8	Alexandra Komarnycky	Canada	2:18.81	
21	2	1	Melanie Dodds	Canada	2:18.85	
22	1	4	Genevieve Cantin	Canada	2:19.34	
23	3	1	Barbara Jardin	Canada	2:19.60	
24	4	8	Lindsay Seemann	Canada	2:19.71	
25	1	3	Maroua Mathlouthi	Tunisia	2:23.10	
26	2	8	Larissa Cieslak	Brazil	2:23.32	
27	1	6	Natalia Favoreto	Brazil	2:28.92	
-	1	5	Tianna Rissling	Canada	DNS	

=== B Final ===
The B final was held on August 21, at 18:18.

Rank	Lane	Name	Nationality	Time	Notes
9	1	Elizabeth Pelton	United States	2:12.90	
10	4	Morgan Scroggy	United States	2:13.08	
11	5	Tomoyo Fukuda	Japan	2:16.02	
12	6	Sinead Russell	Canada	2:16.42	
13	8	Alexandra Komarnycky	Canada	2:16.80	
14	3	Miho Takahashi	Japan	2:18.51	
15	2	Genevieve Cantin	Canada	2:19.52	
16	7	Larissa Cieslak	Brazil	2:24.10	

=== A Final ===
The A final was held on August 21, at 18:18.

Rank	Lane	Name	Nationality	Time	Notes
1st place, gold medalist(s)	7	Emily Seebohm	Australia	2:09.93	CR
2nd place, silver medalist(s)	4	Ariana Kukors	United States	2:10.25	
3rd place, bronze medalist(s)	5	Caitlin Leverenz	United States	2:11.21	
4	3	Julia Wilkinson	Canada	2:11.32	
5	6	Alicia Coutts	Australia	2:11.88	
6	2	Erica Morningstar	Canada	2:12.35	
7	1	Natalie Wiegersma	New Zealand	2:14.36	
8	8	Izumi Kato	Japan	2:14.51	
