= Swimming at the 2010 Asian Games – Women's 400 metre individual medley =

Women's 400 metre individual medley at the 2010 Asian Games
- Venue: Aoti Aquatics Centre
- Date: 14 November 2010
- Competitors: 10 from 8 nations

Medalists
gold medal	Ye Shiwen	China
silver medal	Li Xuanxu	China
bronze medal	Cheng Wan-jung	Chinese Taipei

The women's 400 metre individual medley event at the 2010 Asian Games took place on 14 November 2010 at Guangzhou Aoti Aquatics Centre.

There were 10 competitors from 8 countries who took part in this event. Two heats were held, the heat in which a swimmer competed did not formally matter for advancement, as the swimmers with the top eight times from the both field qualified for the finals.

Ye Shiwen and Li Xuanxu from China won the gold and silver medal, respectively, Cheng Wan-Jung from Chinese Taipei finished with third place, it was the first swimming medal for Chinese Taipei since 1998 Asian Games.

== Schedule ==
All times are China Standard Time (UTC+08:00)

Date	Time	Event
Sunday, 14 November 2010	09:16	Heats
Sunday, 14 November 2010	18:06	Final

== Records ==
Prior to this competition, the existing world, Asian and Games records were as follows.

World Record	Stephanie Rice (AUS)	4:29.45	Beijing, China	10 August 2008
Asian Record	Li Xuanxu (CHN)	4:30.43	Jinan, China	17 October 2009
Games Record	Qi Hui (CHN)	4:38.31	Doha, Qatar	3 December 2006

== Results ==
=== Heats ===
Rank	Heat	Athlete	Time	Notes
1	1	Ye Shiwen (CHN)	4:44.09	
2	1	Izumi Kato (JPN)	4:44.72	
3	2	Li Xuanxu (CHN)	4:45.42	
4	1	Maiko Fujino (JPN)	4:45.67	
5	2	Nam Yoo-sun (KOR)	4:46.59	
6	2	Cheng Wan-jung (TPE)	4:47.90	
7	2	Patarawadee Kittiya (THA)	4:58.93	
8	1	Ranohon Amanova (UZB)	4:59.46	
9	2	Erica Totten (PHI)	5:01.59	
10	1	Carmen Nam (HKG)	5:05.27	

=== Final ===
Rank	Athlete	Time	Notes
1st place, gold medalist(s)	Ye Shiwen (CHN)	4:33.79	GR
2nd place, silver medalist(s)	Li Xuanxu (CHN)	4:38.05	
3rd place, bronze medalist(s)	Cheng Wan-jung (TPE)	4:41.55	
4	Maiko Fujino (JPN)	4:42.31	
5	Izumi Kato (JPN)	4:46.02	
6	Nam Yoo-sun (KOR)	4:47.11	
7	Ranohon Amanova (UZB)	4:55.49	
8	Patarawadee Kittiya (THA)	4:57.44	
