= 2011 FINA Swimming World Cup =

The 2011 FINA Swimming World Cup was a series of seven, two-day, short course meets in seven cities in October and November 2011. Arena was again the title sponsor for the series, with Omega serving as official timer.

== Meets ==
The 2011 World Cup consisted of the following seven meets:

Meet	Dates	Location
1	October 7–8	Dubai, United Arab Emirates
2	October 15–16	Stockholm, Sweden
3	October 18–19	Moscow, Russia
4	October 22–23	Berlin, Germany
5	November 4–5	Singapore
6	November 8–9	Beijing, China
7	November 12–13	Tokyo, Japan

== World Cup standings ==
=== Men ===
Official overall scoring:

Rank	Name	Nationality	Points awarded (Bonus)							Total
Rank	Name	Nationality	UAE	SWE	RUS	GER	SIN	CHN	JPN	Total
1	Chad le Clos	South Africa	25	16	20	25	25	25		136
2	Hidemasa Sano	Japan		25	25	20				70
3	Marco Koch	Germany	20	5		2	16	13		56
4	Naoya Tomita	Japan		7	2		20	16		45
5	Michael Phelps	United States			16	16				32
6	Kenneth To	Australia		20	10	1				31
7	Paul Biedermann	Germany		3	13	7				23
8	Sun Xiaolei	China						20		20
9	Daiya Seto	Japan		13		5				18
10	Chris Wright	Australia					10	7		17
11	Evgeny Korotyshkin	Russia	10		3	3				16
12	Dinko Jukić	Austria	16							16
13	James Goddard	United Kingdom				13				13
14	Kosuke Hagino	Japan					13			13
15	Samuel Pizzetti	Italy	13							13
16	Aschwin Wildeboer	Spain				10				10
17	Dávid Verrasztó	Hungary		10						10
18	Yun Hao	China						10		10
19	Christian Sprenger	Australia					7			7
20	Nikita Lobintsev	Russia			7					7
21	Yuma Kosaka	Japan	7							7
22	Paweł Korzeniowski	Poland		1	5					6
23	Jun Dai	China						5		5
24	Brenton Rickard	Australia					5			5
25	Sergii Frolov	Ukraine	5							5
26	Omar Pinzón	Colombia						3		3
27	David McKeon	Australia					3			3
28	Chen Yin	China						2	1	3
29	Masafumi Yamaguchi	Japan	3							3
30	Weiwu Chen	China						2		2
31	Geoff Huegill	Australia		2						2
32	Jason Dunford	Kenya	2							2
33	Tyler McGill	United States			1					1
34	Cameron McEvory	Australia					1			1
35	Gustav Åberg Lejdström	Sweden	1							1

=== Women ===
Official overall scoring:

Rank	Name	Nationality	Points awarded (Bonus)							Total
Rank	Name	Nationality	UAE	SWE	RUS	GER	SIN	CHN	JPN	Total
1	Therese Alshammar	Sweden		16	16	13	25	25		95
2	Missy Franklin	United States			25	25 (20)				70*
3	Lu Ying	China		13	13			16		42
4	Allison Schmitt	United States			20	20				40
5	Blair Evans	Australia					20	20		40
6	Angie Bainbridge	Australia		20		10				30
7	Choi Hye Ra	South Korea		3	2		16	7		28
8	Daryna Zevina	Ukraine	25			2				27
9	Sarah Sjöström	Sweden		25						25
10	Izumi Kato	Japan	16	2	3					21
11	Jie Gong	China		10	10					20
12	Liu Xiaoyu	China	20							20
13	Erica Morningstar	Canada		7	7	5				19
14	Belinda Hocking	Australia				16				16
15	Liu Yang Jiao	China					10	5		15
16	Melissa Ingram	New Zealand						13		21
17	Emma McKeon	Australia					13			13
18	Ranomi Kromowidjojo	Netherlands	13							13
19	Yanxin Zhou	China						10		10
20	Marleen Veldhuis	Netherlands	10							10
21	Francesca Halsall	United Kingdom				7				7
22	Cate Campbell	Australia					7			7
23	Shijia Wang	China	8							7
24	Theresa Michalak	Germany		5						5
25	Elena Sokolova	Russia			5					5
26	Kylie Palmer	Australia					5			5
27	Rong Fan	China	5							5
28	Elizabeth Simmonds	United Kingdom				3				3
29	Lili Zhou	China						3		3
30	Tao Li	Singapore					3			3
31	Petra Granlund	Sweden	3							3
32	Jing Zhao	China						2		2
33	Jessica Pengelly	South Africa					2			2
34	Hang Yu Sze	Hong Kong	2							2
35	Lotte Friis	Denmark				1				1
36	Zsuzsanna Jakabos	Hungary		1						1
37	Kanako Watanabe	Japan						1		1
38	Olivia Halicek	Australia					1			1
39	Daniela Schreiber	Germany			1					1
40	Barbora Závadová	Czech Republic	1							1

(*) including 20 points for WR bonus

=== Event winners ===
==== 50 m freestyle ====
Meet	Men			Women		
Meet	Winner	Nationality	Time	Winner	Nationality	Time
Dubai	Krisztián Takács; Jason Dunford	Hungary; Kenya	21.78	Marleen Veldhuis	Netherlands	24.14
Stockholm	Stefan Nystrand	Sweden	21.70	Therese Alshammar	Sweden	23.80
Moscow	Brent Hayden	Canada	21.65	Therese Alshammar	Sweden	24.27
Berlin	Sergei Fesikov	Russia	21.45	Therese Alshammar	Sweden	23.67
Singapore	Lü Zhiwu	China	21.56	Therese Alshammar	Sweden	23.98
Beijing	Kyle Richardson	Australia	21.75	Emma McKeon	Australia	24.15
Tokyo	Kenta Ito	Japan	21.25	Cate Campbell	Australia	23.93

==== 100 m freestyle ====
Meet	Men			Women		
Meet	Winner	Nationality	Time	Winner	Nationality	Time
Dubai	Jason Dunford	Kenya	47.95	Ranomi Kromowidjojo	Netherlands	52.88
Stockholm	Stefan Nystrand	Sweden	47.08	Sarah Sjöström	Sweden	52.44
Moscow	Nikita Lobintsev	Russia	47.32	Missy Franklin	United States	52.80
Berlin	Brent Hayden	Canada	47.06	Missy Franklin	United States	52.09
Singapore	Cameron McEvoy	Australia	47.33	Emma McKeon	Australia	52.41
Beijing	Kyle Richardson	Australia	47.38	Emma McKeon	Australia	53.09
Tokyo	Kyle Richardson	Australia	47.31	Cate Campbell	Australia	52.31

==== 200 m freestyle ====
Meet	Men			Women		
Meet	Winner	Nationality	Time	Winner	Nationality	Time
Dubai	Kai Wai David Wong	Hong Kong	1:46.70	Shijia Wang	China	1:56.76
Stockholm	Paul Biedermann	Germany	1:43.44	Sarah Sjöström	Sweden	1:52.92
Moscow	Paul Biedermann	Germany	1:43.15	Missy Franklin; Allison Schmitt	United States	1:53.72
Berlin	Paul Biedermann	Germany	1:42.42	Allison Schmitt	United States	1:52.08 WC
Singapore	Chad le Clos	South Africa	1:43.80	Blair Evans	Australia	1:55.48
Beijing	Chad le Clos	South Africa	1:43.62	Blair Evans	Australia	1:54.81
Tokyo	Chad le Clos	South Africa	1:43.79	Haruda Ueda	Japan	1:53.77

==== 400 m freestyle ====
Meet	Men			Women		
Meet	Winner	Nationality	Time	Winner	Nationality	Time
Dubai	Samuel Pizzetti	Italy	3:45.45	Petra Granlund	Sweden	4:15.53
Stockholm	Paul Biedermann	Germany	3:43.45	Angie Bainbridge	Australia	4:03.02
Moscow	Paul Biedermann	Germany	3:40.40	Allison Schmitt	United States	4:02.23
Berlin	Paul Biedermann	Germany	3:41.19	Allison Schmitt	United States	3:59.71
Singapore	David McKeon	Australia	3:42.82	Blair Evans	Australia	4:01.15
Beijing	Robert Hurley	Australia	3:41.93	Blair Evans	Australia	3:58.31
Tokyo	Robert Hurley	Australia	3:42.44	Blair Evans	Australia	4:01.24

==== 1500 m (men)/800 m (women) freestyle ====
Meet	Men			Women		
Meet	Winner	Nationality	Time	Winner	Nationality	Time
Dubai	Samuel Pizzetti	Italy	14:56.85	Spela Bohinc	Slovenia	8:45.43
Stockholm	Pál Joensen	Faroe Islands	14:52.00	Evelyn Verrasztó	Hungary	8:20.78
Moscow	Stefan Šorak	Serbia	15:04.07	Elena Sokolova	Russia	8:21.82
Berlin	Sebastien Rouault	France	14:48.13	Lotte Friis	Denmark	8:16.99
Singapore	David McKeon	Australia	14:56.90	Jessica Pengelly	South Africa	8:22.05
Beijing	Yun Hao	China	14:40.15	Lili Zhou	China	8:18.79
Tokyo	Youhei Takiguchi	Japan	14:42.22	Ren Luomeng	China	8:22.59

==== 50 m backstroke ====
Meet	Men			Women		
Meet	Winner	Nationality	Time	Winner	Nationality	Time
Dubai	Masafumi Yamaguchi	Japan	24.17	Miyuki Takemura	Japan	27.12
Stockholm	Flori Lang	Switzerland	24.46	Rachel Goh	Australia	26.63
Moscow	Vitaly Borisov	Russia	24.22	Rachel Goh	Australia	26.91
Berlin	Feiyi Cheng	China	23.79	Rachel Goh	Australia	26.80
Singapore	Jérémy Stravius	France	23.76	Rachel Goh	Australia	26.73
Beijing	Sun Xiaolei	China	23.34	Zhao Jing	China	26.52
Tokyo	Junya Koga	Japan	24.02	Aya Terakawa	Japan	26.44

==== 100 m backstroke ====
Meet	Men			Women		
Meet	Winner	Nationality	Time	Winner	Nationality	Time
Dubai	Masafumi Yamaguchi	Japan	52.28	Daryna Zevina	Ukraine	58.18
Stockholm	Kenneth To	Australia	52.07	Rachel Goh	Australia	57.55
Moscow	Feiyi Cheng	China	52.14	Missy Franklin	United States	57.39
Berlin	Aschwin Wildeboer	Spain	50.23	Missy Franklin	United States	56.73
Singapore	Jérémy Stravius	France	51.80	Rachel Goh	Australia	57.30
Beijing	Sun Xiaolei	China	50.99	Gao Chang	China	57.22
Tokyo	Junya Koga	Japan	51.21	Aya Terakawa	Japan	56.28

==== 200 m backstroke ====
Meet	Men			Women		
Meet	Winner	Nationality	Time	Winner	Nationality	Time
Dubai	Chad le Clos	South Africa	1:55.95	Daryna Zevina	Ukraine	2:02.94
Stockholm	Chad le Clos	South Africa	1:54.33	Belinda Hocking	Australia	2:05.76
Moscow	Michael Phelps	United States	1:53.24	Missy Franklin	United States	2:03.61
Berlin	Michael Phelps	United States	1:50.34	Missy Franklin	United States	2:00.03 WR
Singapore	Omar Pinzón	Colombia	1:52.27	Alexianne Castel	France	2:04.85
Beijing	Omar Pinzón	Colombia	1:50.46	Melissa Ingram	New Zealand	2:03.00
Tokyo	Omar Pinzón	Colombia	1:51.15	Melissa Ingram	New Zealand	2:03.39

==== 50 m breaststroke ====
Meet	Men			Women		
Meet	Winner	Nationality	Time	Winner	Nationality	Time
Dubai	Marco Koch	Germany	27.51	Liu Xiaoyu	China	30.52
Stockholm	Glenn Snyders	New Zealand	27.04	Jennie Johansson	Sweden	30.05
Moscow	Xiayan Li	China	26.87	Valentina Artemyeva	Russia	30.23
Berlin	Glenn Snyders	New Zealand	26.88	Valentina Artemyeva	Russia	30.04
Singapore	Christian Sprenger	Australia	26.67	Leiston Pickett	Australia	30.29
Beijing	Christian Sprenger	Australia	26.64	Leiston Pickett	Australia	30.23
Tokyo	Christian Sprenger	Australia	26.54	Leiston Pickett	Australia	30.28

==== 100 m breaststroke ====
Meet	Men			Women		
Meet	Winner	Nationality	Time	Winner	Nationality	Time
Dubai	Marco Koch	Germany	59.07	Liu Xiaoyu	China	1:04.79
Stockholm	Alexander Dale Oen	Norway	58.30	Jennie Johansson	Sweden	1:05.27
Moscow	Naoya Tomita	Japan	58.81	Valentina Artemyeva	Russia	1:06.35
Berlin	Glenn Snyders	New Zealand	57.82	Jennie Johansson	Sweden	1:05.60
Singapore	Christian Sprenger	Australia	57.91	Kim Hye-jin	South Korea	1:05.78
Beijing	Christian Sprenger	Australia	57.99	Leiston Pickett	Australia	1:05.49
Tokyo	Ryo Tateishi	Japan	57.52	Kim Hye-jin	South Korea	1:05.37

==== 200 m breaststroke ====
Meet	Men			Women		
Meet	Winner	Nationality	Time	Winner	Nationality	Time
Dubai	Marco Koch	Germany	2:04.97	Rong Fan	China	2:22.58
Stockholm	Naoya Tomita	Japan	2:05.12	Kim Hye-jin	South Korea	2:22.41
Moscow	Naoya Tomita	Japan	2:06.51	Kanako Watanabe	Japan	2:20.94
Berlin	Marco Koch	Germany	2:04.61	Kanako Watanabe	Japan	2:20.03
Singapore	Naoya Tomita	Japan	2:04.93	Kanako Watanabe	Japan	2:20.32
Beijing	Marco Koch	Germany	2:04.72	Kanako Watanabe	Japan	2:19.05
Tokyo	Ryo Tateishi	Japan	2:03.49	Rie Kanetou	Japan	2:19.72

==== 50 m butterfly ====
Meet	Men			Women		
Meet	Winner	Nationality	Time	Winner	Nationality	Time
Dubai	Jason Dunford	Kenya	23.33	Marleen Veldhuis	Netherlands	26.02
Stockholm	Geoff Huegill	Australia	22.70	Therese Alshammar	Sweden	25.23
Moscow	Geoff Huegill	Australia	22.96	Therese Alshammar	Sweden	25.06
Berlin	Geoff Huegill	Australia	22.67	Therese Alshammar	Sweden	25.18
Singapore	Jason Dunford	Kenya	22.92	Therese Alshammar	Sweden	25.01
Beijing	Shi Feng	China	23.47	Therese Alshammar	Sweden	25.40
Tokyo	Ryo Takayasu	Japan	22.68	Therese Alshammar	Sweden	25.35

==== 100 m butterfly ====
Meet	Men			Women		
Meet	Winner	Nationality	Time	Winner	Nationality	Time
Dubai	Chad le Clos	South Africa	50.66	Junyao Wang	China	58.05
Stockholm	Tyler McGill	United States	51.04	Therese Alshammar	Sweden	55.99
Moscow	Evgeny Korotyshkin	Russia	50.72	Lu Ying	China	56.63
Berlin	Evgeny Korotyshkin	Russia	50.04	Therese Alshammar	Sweden	55.62
Singapore	Chad le Clos	South Africa	50.63	Therese Alshammar	Sweden	56.03
Beijing	Chad le Clos	South Africa	50.93	Therese Alshammar	Sweden	55.76
Tokyo	Ryo Takayasu	Japan	50.52	Therese Alshammar	Sweden	55.95

==== 200 m butterfly ====
Meet	Men			Women		
Meet	Winner	Nationality	Time	Winner	Nationality	Time
Dubai	Chad le Clos	South Africa	1:52.55	Petra Granlund	Sweden	2:09.71
Stockholm	Hidemasa Sano	Japan	1:51.33	Jie Gong	China	2:03.91
Moscow	Hidemasa Sano	Japan	1:51.62	Jie Gong	China	2:04.32
Berlin	Chad le Clos	South Africa	1:50.15	Choi Hye Ra	South Korea	2:04.48
Singapore	Chad le Clos	South Africa	1:51.05	Choi Hye Ra	South Korea	2:04.11
Beijing	Chad le Clos	South Africa	1:51.74	Choi Hye Ra	South Korea	2:03.65
Tokyo	Takeshi Matsuda	Japan	1:49.50	Choi Hye Ra	South Korea	2:04.16

==== 100 m individual medley ====
Meet	Men			Women		
Meet	Winner	Nationality	Time	Winner	Nationality	Time
Dubai	Chad le Clos	South Africa	53.48	Hang Yu Sze	China	1:01.53
Stockholm	Kenneth To	Australia	52.02	Theresa Michalak	Germany	59.30
Moscow	Michael Phelps	United States	52.19	Erica Morningstar	Canada	1:00.57
Berlin	Michael Phelps	United States	51.65	Francesca Halsall	United Kingdom	58.73
Singapore	Chad le Clos	South Africa	53.06	Olivia Halicek	Australia	59.86
Beijing	Chad le Clos	South Africa	52.89	Jiao Liuyang	China	59.50
Tokyo	Takurou Fujii	Japan	52.78	Zhao Jing	China	59.54

==== 200 m individual medley ====
Meet	Men			Women		
Meet	Winner	Nationality	Time	Winner	Nationality	Time
Dubai	Chad le Clos	South Africa	1:55.14	Izumi Kato	Japan	2:09.04
Stockholm	Daiya Seto	Japan	1:54.65	Erica Morningstar	Canada	2:07.90
Moscow	Chad le Clos	South Africa	1:55.26	Erica Morningstar	Canada	2:08.46
Berlin	Michael Phelps	United States	1:51.89	Erica Morningstar	Canada	2:06.97
Singapore	Chad le Clos	South Africa	1:54.06	Choi Hye Ra	South Korea	2:08.40
Beijing	Chad le Clos	South Africa	1:55.04	Choi Hye Ra	South Korea	2:07.72
Tokyo	Kousuke Hagino	Japan	1:53.67	Choi Hye Ra	South Korea	2:07.23

==== 400 m individual medley ====
Meet	Men			Women		
Meet	Winner	Nationality	Time	Winner	Nationality	Time
Dubai	Chad le Clos	South Africa	4:04.58	Izumi Kato	Japan	4:34.52
Stockholm	Chad le Clos	South Africa	4:03.10	Zsuzsanna Jakabos	Hungary	4:29.65
Moscow	Daiya Seto	Japan	4:07.16	Izumi Kato	Japan	4:34.00
Berlin	Michael Phelps	United States	4:01.49	Izumi Kato	Japan	4:31.93
Singapore	Chad le Clos	South Africa	4:04.16	Miyu Otuska	Japan	4:31.35
Beijing	Chad le Clos	South Africa	4:07.35	Zhou Min	China	4:30.66
Tokyo	Daiya Seto	Japan	4:02.44	Miho Takahashi	Japan	4:29.98

Legend: WR – World record; (WR) – World record when swum (earning bonus World Cup points); WC – World Cup record; (WC) – World Cup record when swum
