= Swimming at the 2014 Asian Games – Women's 200 metre individual medley =

Women's 200 metre individual medley at the 2014 Asian Games
- Venue: Munhak Park Tae-hwan Aquatics Center
- Date: 26 September 2014
- Competitors: 16 from 10 nations

Medalists
gold medal	Ye Shiwen	China
silver medal	Kanako Watanabe	Japan
bronze medal	Miho Teramura	Japan

The women's 200 metre individual medley event at the 2014 Asian Games took place on 26 September 2014 at Munhak Park Tae-hwan Aquatics Center.

== Schedule ==
All times are Korea Standard Time (UTC+09:00)

Date	Time	Event
Friday, 26 September 2014	09:00	Heats
Friday, 26 September 2014	20:13	Final

== Records ==
Prior to this competition, the existing world, Asian and Games records were as follows.

World Record	Ariana Kukors (USA)	2:06.15	Rome, Italy	27 July 2009
Asian Record	Ye Shiwen (CHN)	2:07.57	London, United Kingdom	31 July 2012
Games Record	Ye Shiwen (CHN)	2:09.37	Guangzhou, China	18 November 2010

== Results ==
=== Heats ===
Rank	Heat	Athlete	Time	Notes
1	2	Ye Shiwen (CHN)	2:11.20	
2	1	Miho Teramura (JPN)	2:13.91	
3	2	Kanako Watanabe (JPN)	2:14.08	
4	1	Zhou Min (CHN)	2:15.45	
5	2	Kim Seo-yeong (KOR)	2:16.20	
6	1	Ranohon Amanova (UZB)	2:16.56	
7	2	Siobhán Haughey (HKG)	2:16.71	
8	2	Nam Yoo-sun (KOR)	2:16.89	
9	1	Nguyễn Thị Ánh Viên (VIE)	2:20.99	
10	1	Phiangkhwan Pawapotako (THA)	2:21.45	
11	2	Samantha Yeo (SIN)	2:22.39	
12	1	Chan Kin Lok (HKG)	2:24.12	
13	2	Tan Jing E (SIN)	2:25.98	
14	1	Tan Chi Yan (MAC)	2:27.36	
15	2	Lei On Kei (MAC)	2:34.98	
16	1	Gabriella Doueihy (LIB)	2:42.20	

=== Final ===
Rank	Athlete	Time	Notes
1st place, gold medalist(s)	Ye Shiwen (CHN)	2:08.94	GR
2nd place, silver medalist(s)	Kanako Watanabe (JPN)	2:10.58	
3rd place, bronze medalist(s)	Miho Teramura (JPN)	2:11.24	
4	Zhou Min (CHN)	2:13.16	
5	Kim Seo-yeong (KOR)	2:14.08	
6	Ranohon Amanova (UZB)	2:15.27	
7	Nam Yoo-sun (KOR)	2:15.48	
8	Siobhán Haughey (HKG)	2:15.63	
