= Jördis Steinegger =

Austrian swimmer

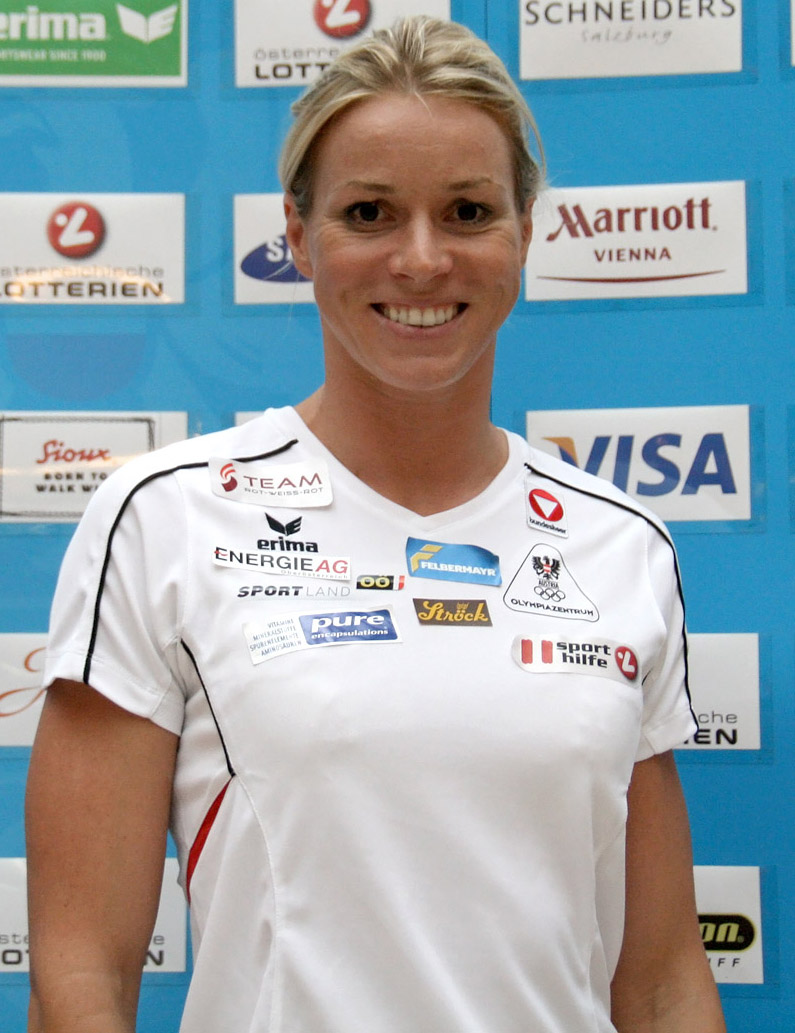

Personal information
- Nationality: Austria
- Born: 8 February 1983 (age 43) Graz, Austria
- Height: 1.72 m (5 ft 7 1/2 in)
- Weight: 57 kg (126 lb)

Sport
- Sport: Swimming
- Strokes: Freestyle, medley
- Club: ASV Linz
- Coach: Marco Wolf
Medal record
Women's swimming
Representing Austria
Universiade
Bronze medal – third place	2007 Bangkok	400 m freestyle
Bronze medal – third place	2011 Shenzhen	400 m medley

Jördis Steinegger (born 8 February 1983 in Graz) is an Austrian swimmer who specialized in freestyle and individual medley events. She is a two-time Olympian, a nine-time long and short course Austrian record holder, and a member of the Linz Amateur Swimming Club (German: Amateurschwimmverein Linz) in Linz, under her personal coach Marco Wolf.

== Swimming career ==
Since she started her sporting career at age fifteen, Steinegger is considered one of Austria's top female swimmers. She achieved more than a hundred titles at the national championships, and has broken numerous records in freestyle (200, 400, 800, and 1500 m), and medley (100, 200, and 400 m). Steinegger made her international debut at the 2007 Summer Universiade in Bangkok, Thailand, where she earned a bronze medal in the 400 m freestyle, posting her time at 4:11.88.

=== 2008 Summer Olympics ===
Steinegger guaranteed her spot on the Austrian team for the 2008 Summer Olympics in Beijing, by obtaining a B-standard entry time of 1:59.17 (200 m freestyle) from the Austrian Swimming Championships in Schwechat. On the first day of the competition, Steinegger challenged seven other swimmers in the second heat of the women's 400 m individual medley, including Norway's Sara Nordenstam, who eventually won a bronze medal in the 200 m breaststroke. She finished the race in fourth place and twenty-sixth overall, by nineteen hundredths of a second (0.19) behind 18-year-old Chinese swimmer Liu Jing, with a time of 4:45.15. The following morning, Steinegger finished fifth and sixteenth overall, on the fourth heat of the women's 400 m freestyle, with a time of 4:09.72, approximately five seconds behind Olympic champions Camelia Potec of Romania and Laure Manaudou of France.

On the third day of the competition, Steinegger edged out Cypriot swimmer Anna Stylianou for a second-place sprint in heat three of the 200 m freestyle, by three hundredths of a second (0.03), clocking at 2:00.52. In her fourth and final event, 800 m freestyle, Steinegger challenged seven other swimmers on the second heat, including 16-year-old Singaporean swimmer Lynette Lim and three-time Olympian Cecilia Biagioli of Argentina. She came only in third place and twenty-second overall by two seconds behind Chile's Kristel Köbrich, posting her time at 8:36.40. Although she failed to advance into the next round, Steinegger broke new Austrian records in all four of her respective swimming events.

=== 2009 FINA World Championships ===
At the 2009 FINA World Championships in Rome, Italy, Steinegger narrowly missed out of the semi-finals in the sixth and final heat of the women's 400 m freestyle by approximately five seconds behind Potec, lowering her Austrian record time to 4:09.30. In her second event, 200 m freestyle, Steinegger became the first female Austrian swimmer to swim under two minutes, and also, attained another record time of 1:59.11 on the tenth and final heat, finishing only in sixth place and twenty-first overall.

=== 2011 season ===
At the 2011 FINA World Championships in Shanghai, China, Steinegger competed only in three swimming events. For her first event, 400 m individual medley, Steinegger swam in the fourth heat against seven other competitors, including Spain's Mireia Belmonte García, China's Ye Shiwen, and multiple-time Olympic medalist Kirsty Coventry of Zimbabwe. She came only in sixth place and thirteenth overall, by one tenth of a second (0.10) behind Slovenia's Anja Klinar, lowering her Austrian record time of 4:41.33. Having attained an Olympic qualifying time of 4:41.75, Steinegger earned a spot on her second Austrian team for the Olympics. She also finished twenty-fourth in the 200 m individual medley, and thirtieth in the 200 m freestyle, but failed to attain an Austrian record.

Shortly after the World Championships, Steinegger won a bronze medal in the women's 400 m individual medley at the 2011 Summer Universiade in Shenzhen, China by one second behind Japan's Miho Takahashi, with a time of 4:43.30. Three months later, Steinegger captured another bronze in the same event at the fourth meet of the FINA World Cup series in Berlin, Germany, with a time of 4:34.50. At the European Short Course Swimming Championships in Szczecin, Poland, Steinegger set a short-course Austrian record time of 4:33.91, by finishing third in the preliminary heats of the women's 400 m individual medley.

=== 2012 Summer Olympics ===
Four years after competing in her first Olympics, Steinegger qualified for her second Austrian team, as a 29-year-old, at the 2012 Summer Olympics in London, by attaining an A-standard entry time of 4:41.33 in the 400 m individual medley. She challenged seven other swimmers on the fourth heat, including Great Britain's Hannah Miley, and defending Olympic champion Stephanie Rice of Australia. She came only in last place and twenty-third overall by 0.19 of a second behind Italy's Stefania Pirozzi, outside her Austrian record time of 4:45.80. In her second event, 200 m freestyle, Steinegger raced the second heat against seven other swimmers, including four-time Olympians Camelia Potec of Romania (former defending champion in 2004), and Hanna-Maria Seppälä of Finland (fourth-place finalist in the 100 m freestyle in 2008). She finished only in sixth place by 0.36 of a second behind Slovakia's Katarína Filová in 2:02.39. Steinegger, however, failed to advance into the semifinals, as she placed twenty-ninth out of 37 swimmers in the preliminary heats.
