= Li Xuanxu =

Chinese swimmer (born 1994)

Medal record

Women's swimming

Representing China

Summer Olympics
Bronze medal – third place	2012 London	400 m individual medley

World Championships (LC)
Bronze medal – third place	2011 Shanghai	1500 m freestyle

World Championships (SC)
Bronze medal – third place	2010 Dubai	400 m individual medley

Summer Universiade
Silver medal – second place	2015 Gwangju	4×200 m freestyle

Asian Games
Gold medal – first place	2010 Guangzhou	800 m freestyle
Silver medal – second place	2010 Guangzhou	400 m medley

Li Xuanxu (Chinese: 李玄旭; pinyin: Lǐ Xuánxù; born February 5, 1994, in Zhuzhou, Hunan) is a Chinese swimmer, who competed for Team China at the 2008 Summer Olympics. At the 2012 Summer Olympics she qualified in second place in the heats with a time of 4:34.28 in the Women's 400 metre individual medley. She won the Bronze medal in the final with 4:32.91.

== Major achievements ==
- 2008 National Champions Tournament - 1st 400 m IM

== See also ==
- China at the 2012 Summer Olympics
