= Swimming at the 2007 Pan American Games – Women's 200 metre breaststroke =

The Women's 200m Breaststroke event at the 2007 Pan American Games took place at the Maria Lenk Aquatic Park in Rio de Janeiro, Brazil, with the final being swum on July 22.

== Medalists ==
Gold	Caitlin Leverenz; United States
Silver	Annamay Pierse; Canada
Bronze	Keri Hehn; United States

== Results ==
=== Finals ===
Place	Swimmer	Country	Time	Note
1	Caitlin Leverenz	United States	2:25.62	
2	Annamay Pierse	Canada	2:26.79	
3	Keri Hehn	United States	2:28.20	
4	Kathleen Stoody	Canada	2:31.38	
5	Adriana Marmolejo	Mexico	2:33.05	
6	Agustina de Giovanni	Argentina	2:36.02	
7	Tatiane Sakemi	Brazil	2:36.17	
8	Alia Atkinson	Jamaica	2:40.19	
