= Natalie Wiegersma =

New Zealand swimmer

Personal information
- Born: January 7, 1990 (age 36) Hamilton, New Zealand

Sport
- Sport: Swimming
- Strokes: Medley

Natalie Wiegersma (born 7 January 1990) is a former medley swimmer for New Zealand who competed at the 2012 Summer Olympics. She finished 19th overall in the heats in the Women's 400 metre individual medley and did not qualify for the final. In the women's 200 metre individual medley, she was 26th in the heats and did not qualify for the semi-finals.
