= Ye Shiwen =

Chinese swimmer (born 1996)

Ye Shiwen 叶诗文
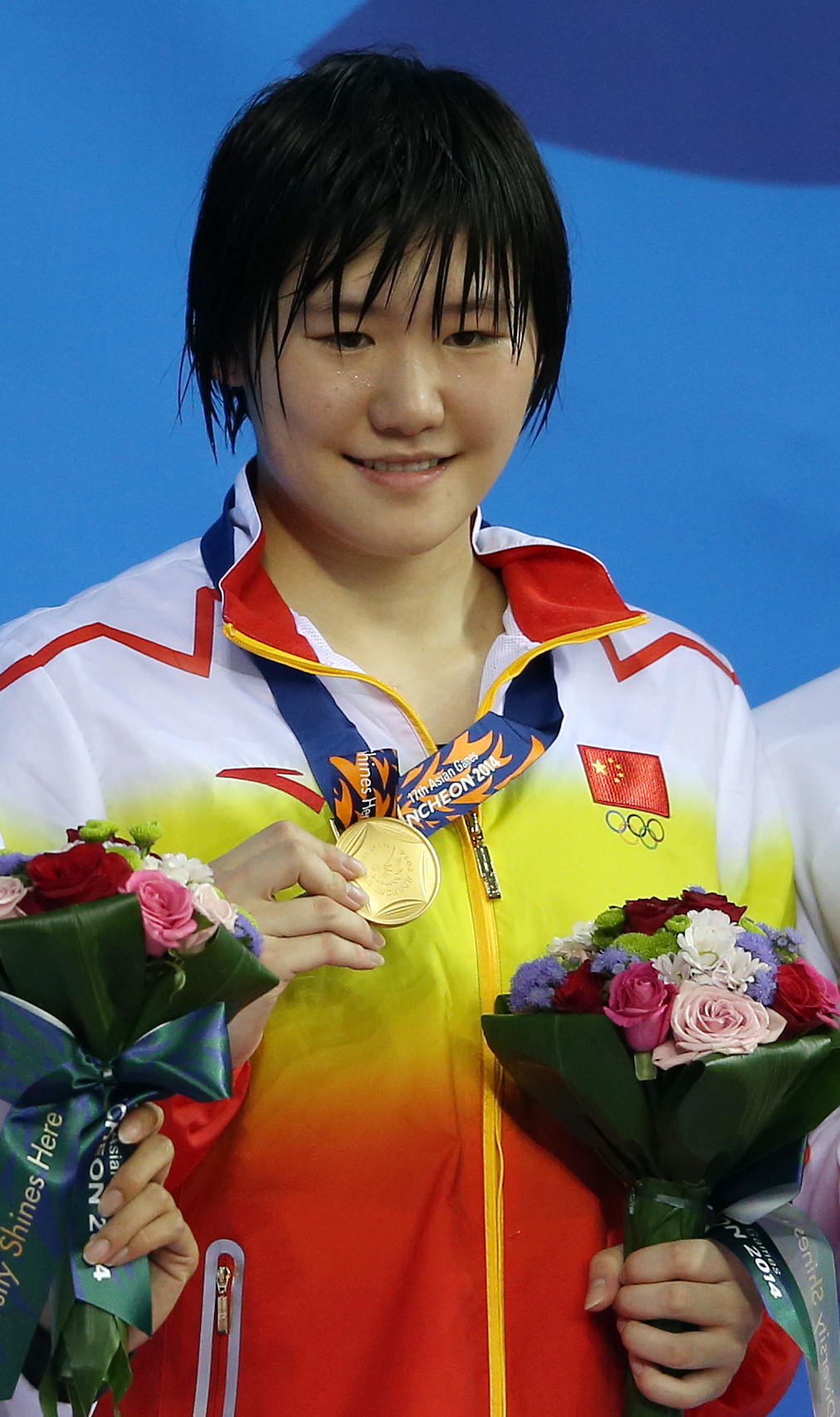

Personal information
- National team: China
- Born: 1 March 1996 (age 30) Hangzhou, Zhejiang, China
- Height: 1.72 m (5 ft 8 in)
- Weight: 64 kg (141 lb)

Sport
- Sport: Swimming
- Strokes: Individual Medley, Breaststroke
Medal record
Women's swimming
Representing China
Olympic Games
Gold medal – first place	2012 London	200 m medley
Gold medal – first place	2012 London	400 m medley
World Championships (LC)
Gold medal – first place	2011 Shanghai	200 m medley
Silver medal – second place	2019 Gwangju	200 m medley
Silver medal – second place	2019 Gwangju	400 m medley
World Championships (SC)
Gold medal – first place	2012 Istanbul	200 m medley
Silver medal – second place	2010 Dubai	200 m medley
Silver medal – second place	2010 Dubai	400 m medley
Silver medal – second place	2012 Istanbul	400 m medley
Asian Games
Gold medal – first place	2010 Guangzhou	200 m medley
Gold medal – first place	2010 Guangzhou	400 m medley
Gold medal – first place	2014 Incheon	200 m medley
Gold medal – first place	2014 Incheon	400 m medley
Gold medal – first place	2014 Incheon	4×100 m freestyle
Gold medal – first place	2022 Hangzhou	200 m breaststroke
Silver medal – second place	2022 Hangzhou	200 m medley

Ye Shiwen
- Simplified Chinese: 叶诗文
- Traditional Chinese: 葉詩文
Transcriptions
Standard Mandarin
- Hanyu Pinyin: Yè Shīwén
- IPA: [jê ʂɻ̩́ wə̌n]

Ye Shiwen (Chinese: 叶诗文; pinyin: Yè Shīwén; Mandarin pronunciation: [jê ʂɻ̩́ wə̌n]; born 1 March 1996) is a Chinese swimmer. At the 2012 Summer Olympics, she won gold medals in the 400 metres and 200 metres individual medley, breaking the world record in the 400 m event and the Olympic record in the 200 m event.

== Early life ==
Ye Shiwen was born in Hangzhou, capital of Zhejiang Province in eastern China. Her father Ye Qingsong was a runner in his youth, and her mother Ning Yiqing, who was a champion long jumper at school, works for a washing machine company. She started swimming at the age of six after her kindergarten teacher noticed she had large hands and feet, joining the Chen Jinglun Sport School in the city. She won the 50m freestyle at the 2006 Zhejiang Provincial Games. She was on the provincial swimming team by 2007 and the Chinese national team by 2008, attending the national junior training camp for two months beginning from October of that year.

She trained in Brisbane, Australia with two world-class coaches, Ken Wood and Denis Cotterell, training that Ye described as "really harsh ... but helpful". Her coach Xu Guoyi stated in 2011 that the training in Australia had helped Ye improve her two weaker swimming strokes, with her strengths being the backstroke and the freestyle.

== Asian Games and World Championships ==
Aged just 14, Ye swam 4:33.79 in the Women's 400m individual medley at the 2010 Asian Games. She swam 2.09.37 in the 200m individual medley (IM), the fastest time in the world for that year, her time for the 400m IM being the second fastest time in the world for that year. At the 2011 World Aquatics Championships in Shanghai, Ye beat both Alicia Coutts and Ariana Kukors to win the gold medal in 200m individual medley.

== 2012 Summer Olympics ==
=== Women's 400m individual medley ===
At the 2012 Summer Olympics, in the third heat of the Women's 400m individual medley she swam 4:31.73, an improvement of two seconds over her previous best time at the 2010 Asian Games. In the final she won the gold medal and broke the world record (held by Stephanie Rice since the 2008 Summer Olympics) with a time of 4:28.43, an improvement of a further three seconds, swimming the last 50m in 28.93 seconds. Ye's time over the final 50m was compared to that of Ryan Lochte, the winner of the corresponding men's event, who swam it just under a fifth of a second slower in 29.10. This prompted allegations of doping against Ye. However, commentators pointed out that these two times were misleading. Lochte's overall time was 23.25 seconds faster, 4:05.18, than Ye's, and the times of all eight finalists in the men's 400m IM were at least 10 seconds faster than Ye's time. When Lochte hit the freestyle leg of the race, he had a comfortable lead over his opponents, whereas Ye was still a body length behind U.S. swimmer Elizabeth Beisel at that point in her race. Phil Lutton, sports editor of the Brisbane Times, observed that Ye "had to hit the burners to motor past Beisel". Data analysis of performances of 2,600 swimmers by two University of Kansas researchers does not find Ye's improvement unusual.

Although there was speculation regarding Ye's significant improvement over a relatively short time, Phil Lutton pointed out that Ye had grown from 160 cm at the time of the 2010 Games to 172 cm at the 2012 Olympics, and that "[t]hat sort of difference in height, length of stroke and size of hand leads to warp-speed improvement". Former Olympic swimming champions Ian Thorpe and Adrian Moorhouse said that they had also improved their personal bests due to growth spurts. The British Olympic Association chairman Colin Moynihan stated in a news conference that Ye had passed drug tests and "deserved recognition for her talent".

=== Women's 200m individual medley ===
In the 200m individual medley final on 31 July 2012, Ye was in third place at the start of the final leg of the race, but she again overtook her competitors in the freestyle leg, winning the gold medal with the time 2:07.57, a new Olympic record. In preliminary heats she had swum 2:08.90, the same time that she achieved in the 2011 World Championships and her tenth best time of all time, with splits of 28.16, 1:00.54, and 1:38.17.

== 2013 World Championships ==
At the 2013 World Aquatics Championships in Barcelona, Ye failed to medal in any events, finishing fourth in the 200 metre individual medley with a time of 2:10.48 and seventh in the 400 metre individual medley with a time of 4:38.51.

== 2014 Asian Games ==
At the 2014 Asian Games in Incheon, Ye won two gold medals in the 200m individual medley with a new games record of 2:08.94 and the 400m individual medley with a new games record of 4:32.97. She also helped China win the gold medal in the 4 × 100 m freestyle.

== 2015 World Championships ==
Ye failed to win any medals at the 2015 World Championships. In the 200m individual medley, she reached the final but placed last with a time of 2:14.01, more than three seconds behind seventh place. In the 400m individual medley, though being the world record holder in the event at that time, she missed a spot in the final, clocking in at 4:42.96.

== 2016 Summer Olympics ==
At the 2016 Summer Olympics in Rio de Janeiro, Ye qualified as fourth fastest for the final of the 200 m individual medley, but finished 8th in the final. In the 400 m individual medley, she failed to qualify for the final.

== 2019 Chinese Nationals ==
At the 2019 Chinese Nationals in Qingdao, China, 23-year-old Ye got 3 individual gold medals in Women's 200&400m individual medley and 200m breaststroke. She found success in 200m IM with a time of 2:09.24 which was her fastest time since the Rio Olympics. She also topped the podium with 4:37.57 in 400m IM and 2:23.46 in 200m Breaststroke (New personal best). Of her swim, Shiwen stated, "Compared with 200m IM and 200m breaststroke, 400 IM was the weakest part of my events. But it was a good sign that I am a reborn swimmer." (Xinhuanet)

== Results ==
- 2010 National Championships – 200m individual medley; 400m individual medley; 100m freestyle
- 2010 China Water Games – 200m individual medley; 400m individual medley
- 2010 FINA Swimming World Cup (Beijing Leg) – 200m individual medley; 400m individual medley; 100m freestyle
- 2010 Asian Games – 200 m individual medley; 400 m individual medley
- 2010 World Championships (25 m) – 200 m individual medley; 400 m individual medley
- 2011 National Championships – 200m individual medley; 400m individual medley; 4 × 200 m freestyle relay
- 2011 World Aquatics Championships – 200m individual medley
- 2012 National Championships – 200m individual medley; 400m individual medley; 4 × 200 m freestyle relay
- 2012 Olympics – 200m individual medley; 400 m individual medley
- 2012 FINA Swimming World Cup (Beijing Leg) – 200m individual medley; 400m individual medley
- 2012 World Championships (25 m) – 200 m individual medley; 400 m individual medley
- 2013 BHP BILLITON Aquatic Super Series – 200m individual medley; 400m individual medley
- 2013 National Championships – 200m freestyle; 200m backstroke; 200m individual medley; 400m individual medley
- 2013 National Games of China – 200m individual medley; 400m individual medley; 200m backstroke; 4 × 200 m freestyle relay; 4 × 100 m medley relay
- 2013 East Asia Games – 200m individual medley
- 2013 National Trails – 200m backstroke; 4 × 200 m freestyle relay
- 2014 BHP BILLITON Aquatic Super Series – 200m individual medley
- 2014 National Championships – 400m individual medley
- 2014 Asian Games – 200m individual medley; 400m individual medley; 4 × 100 m freestyle relay
- 2014 National Trials – 200m butterfly
- 2014 FINA Swimming World Cup (Beijing Leg) – 100m individual medley

== Personal bests ==
=== Long course (50 m) ===
Event	Time	Meet	Date	Notes
200 m IM	2:07.57	2012 Olympics	31 July 2012	AR, Former OR
400 m IM	4:28.43	2012 Olympics	28 July 2012	AR, Former WR
100 m Freestyle	0:54.73	2014 National Swimming Championships	14 May 2014	
200 m Freestyle	1:57.54	2013 National Swimming Championships	4 April 2013	
100 m Backstroke	1:01.87	2014 National Swimming Trials	17 October 2014	
200 m Backstroke	2:09.12	2013 National Swimming Championships	7 April 2013	
200 m Breaststroke	2:22.44	2023 National Swimming Championships	5 May 2023	
200 m Butterfly	2:09.39	2014 National Swimming Trials	14 October 2014	

=== Short course (25 m) ===
Event	Time	Meet	Date	Notes
200 m IM	2:04.64	2012 World Championships	15 December 2012	AR
400 m IM	4:23.33	2012 World Championships	12 December 2012	AR
100 m IM	0:58.36	2014 World Cup(Beijing Leg)	25 Oct 2014	AR

== See also ==
- China at the 2012 Summer Olympics

Records
Preceded by (Australia) Stephanie Rice	Women's 400 metre individual medley world record holder (long course); 28 July 2012 – 6 August 2016	Succeeded by (Hungary) Katinka Hosszú
Awards
Preceded by (Australia) Alicia Coutts	Pacific Rim Swimmer of the Year; 2011, 2012	Succeeded by (Australia) Cate Campbell
