= Kotuku Ngawati =

Australian swimmer

Personal information
- Born: 16 June 1994 (age 32) Melbourne, Australia

Sport
- Sport: Swimming
Medal record
Representing Australia
World Championships (LC)
| Bronze medal – third place | 2017 Budapest | 4x200 m freestyle |
World Championships (SC)
| Silver medal – second place | 2010 Dubai | 100 m medley |

Kotuku Ngawati (born 16 June 1994) is an Australian swimmer. She competed in the women's 200 metre individual medley event at the 2016 Summer Olympics. Ngawati is of New Zealand Māori descent, and affiliates with the Ngāpuhi iwi (tribe).
