= Caitlin Leverenz =

American swimmer (born 1991)

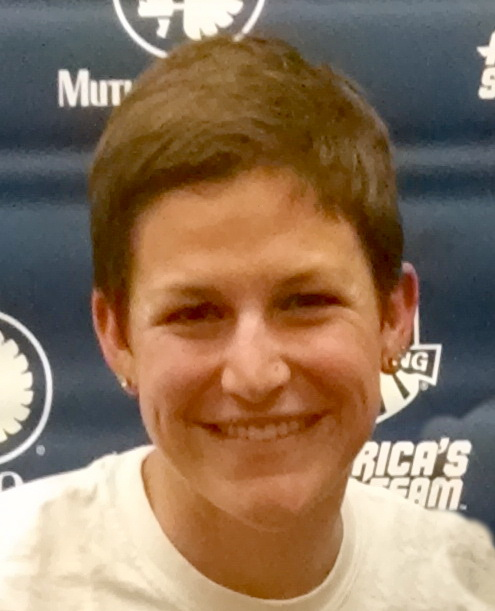
- Leverenz in 2014

Personal information
- Full name: Caitlin Leverenz Smith
- National team: United States
- Born: Caitlin Leverenz; February 26, 1991 (age 35) Tucson, Arizona, U.S.
- Height: 5 ft 8 in (173 cm)
- Spouse: Collin Smith (2015–present)

Sport
- Sport: Swimming
- Strokes: Breaststroke, individual medley
- Club: California Aquatics
- College team: University of California, Berkeley
Medal record
Women's swimming
Representing the United States
Olympic Games
Bronze medal – third place	2012 London	200 m medley
Pan Pacific Championships
Bronze medal – third place	2010 Irvine	200 m medley
Bronze medal – third place	2010 Irvine	400 m medley
Bronze medal – third place	2014 Gold Coast	200 m medley
Pan American Games
Gold medal – first place	2007 Rio	200 m breaststroke
Gold medal – first place	2015 Toronto	200 m medley
Gold medal – first place	2015 Toronto	400 m medley

Caitlin Leverenz Smith (born February 26, 1991) is an American former competition swimmer who specializes in breaststroke and medley events. She won the bronze medal in the 200-meter individual medley event at the 2012 Summer Olympics.

== Early years ==
Leverenz was born in Tucson, Arizona. She attended Sahuaro High School in Tucson and was a member of the Sahauro Cougars High School swim team. As a high school senior, she was one of the top college swimming recruits in the nation. She also trained with and swam for the El Dorado Aquatics Club in Tucson.

== College career ==
Leverenz received an athletic scholarship to attend the University of California, Berkeley, where she swam for coach Teri McKeever's California Golden Bears swimming and diving team in National Collegiate Athletic Association (NCAA) competition. At the NCAA national championships in 2011, she swam the breaststroke legs for the Golden Bears' winning relay teams in the 4x50-yard and 4x100-yard medley relay events. The Bears set a new American and NCAA record time of 1:35.03 in the 4x50 medley. At the 2012 NCAA national championships, she again was a member of the Bears' winning 4x50-yard and 4x100-yard medley relay teams, as well as winning individual national championships in the 200-yard individual medley and the 200-yard breaststroke events. She was a key contributor to the Golden Bears winning two NCAA national team championships in three years. She was the recipient of the Honda Sports Award for Swimming and Diving, recognizing her as the outstanding college female swimmer of 2011–12.

== International career ==
Leverenz represented the United States in Brazil for the World Youth Championships and in the Mutual of Omaha Duel in the Pool. She won the gold medal and broke the meet record in the 200-meter breaststroke at the 2007 Pan American Games. At the United States Swimming National Championships in 2007, she won the U.S. championship in the 400-meter individual medley.

At the 2008 U.S. Olympic Trials, she placed fourth in both the 200-meter and 400-meter individual medley. She also finished third in the 200-meter breaststroke, just missing out on making the 2008 U.S. Olympic Team.

=== 2012 Summer Olympics ===
At the 2012 United States Olympic Trials in Omaha, Nebraska, Leverenz made the U.S. Olympic team by finishing first in the 200-meter individual medley and second in the 400-meter individual medley. She also competed in the 200-meter breaststroke, but finished in eighth place in the final.

At the 2012 Summer Olympics in London, she won her first Olympic medal, a bronze, in the finals of the 200-meter individual medley. She also competed in the 400-meter individual medley, where she tied for sixth in the finals.

After the 2012 Olympic Games Leverenz went on to represent the United States in many international competitions. At the 2014 Pan Pacific Championships she won a bronze medal in the 200-m individual medley. Leverenz went on to earn two gold medals at the 2015 Pan American Games in the 200-meter individual medley and 400-meter individual medley. Leverenz was also elected by her peers to be team captain of the 2015 Pan American Games Team. Leverenz was the top female American finisher the Arena Pro Swim Series, winning her a BMW lease, for the 2013-2014 and 2014-2015 seasons.

In her final career competition, Leverenz missed qualifying for the 2016 Summer Olympic Games in the 200-m individual medley by .05 seconds. Leverenz retired from professional swimming in March 2017.

== Personal life ==
Leverenz was born in Tucson, Arizona. She graduated from Sahuaro High School in 2009 and then attended the University of California, Berkeley and swam for the California Golden Bears Women's Swimming and Diving team.

Leverenz married Collin Smith, who played water polo at Cal, in January 2015. Their child, Logan, was born in July 2020.

She attended Stanford Graduate School of Business, where she expects to complete her MBA in spring 2020.

== See also ==
- California Golden Bears
- List of Olympic medalists in swimming (women)
- List of United States records in swimming
- List of University of California, Berkeley alumni
