= Li Jiaxing =

Chinese swimmer

Personal information
- Born: March 19, 1990 (age 36) Wuhan, Hubei, China

Sport
- Sport: Swimming
- Strokes: Backstroke, medley

Li Jiaxing (Chinese: 李佳星; born 19 March 1990) is a Chinese swimmer, who competed for Team China at the 2008 Summer Olympics and 2012 Summer Olympics.

== Major achievements ==
- 2007 National Champions Tournament - 3rd 200m IM;
- 2007 National Championships - 3rd 100m back;
- 2008 World Short-Course Championships - 4th 200m IM

== See also ==
- China at the 2012 Summer Olympics - Swimming
