= Hanna Dzerkal =

Ukrainian swimmer (born 1987)

Personal information
- Native name: Ганна Леонідівна Дзеркаль
- Full name: Hanna Leonidivna Dzerkal
- Born: 18 August 1987 (age 38) Yuzhnoukrainsk, Ukrainian SSR, Soviet Union
- Height: 171 cm (5 ft 7 in) (2012)
- Weight: 62 kg (137 lb) (2012)
Medal record
Women's swimming
Representing Ukraine
European Championships (SC)
Bronze medal – third place	2012 Chartres	200 m breaststroke

Hanna Leonidivna Dzerkal (Ганна Леонідівна Дзеркаль, also spelled Ganna Dzerkal; born 18 August 1987 in Yuzhnoukrainsk) is a Ukrainian swimmer who competes in the Women's 200m and 400m individual medley, the women's 200m Breaststroke, and the 4 × 200 m freestyle relay. At the 2012 Summer Olympics she finished 26th overall in the heats in the Women's 400 metre individual medley and failed to reach the final. In the 200 metre medley she won her heat. She finished in 17th in the 200 m breaststroke and helped the Ukrainian team reach 16th in the 4 × 200 m freestyle event.
