= Daria Belyakina =

Russian swimmer (born 1986)

Medal record

Women's swimming

Representing Russia

World Championships (SC)
Silver medal – second place	2012 Istanbul	4×200 m freestyle

Daria Belyakina (born 16 September 1986) is a Russian swimmer. She competed at two Olympics, in the 200 m and 400 m freestyle and the 4 × 100 m freestyle at the 2008 Summer Olympics and in the 4 × 200 metre freestyle relay event at the 2012 Summer Olympics.
