= Elodie Poo-cheong =

Mauritian swimmer

Elodie Poo-Cheong
Personal information
- Full name: Élodie Niouk Yam Poo-Cheong
- Born: 20 November 1996 (age 29)

Sport
- Sport: Swimming

Elodie Poo-Cheong (born 20 November 1996) is a Mauritian swimmer. She competed in the women's 100 metre freestyle event at the 2017 World Aquatics Championships. She also competed in four events at the 2018 Commonwealth Games.
