= Ariana Kukors =

American swimmer (born 1989)

Personal information
- National team: United States
- Born: June 1, 1989 (age 37) Federal Way, Washington, U.S.
- Height: 5 ft 7 in (170 cm)
- Weight: 141 lb (64 kg)

Sport
- Sport: Swimming
- Strokes: Breaststroke, freestyle, individual medley
- Club: King Aquatic Club; FAST Swim Team
- College team: University of Washington
- Coach: Sean Hutchinson (Fast Swim Team); Whitney Hite (U. Washington)
Medal record
Women's swimming
Representing the United States
World Championships (LC)
Gold medal – first place	2009 Rome	200 m medley
Silver medal – second place	2009 Rome	4×200 m freestyle
Bronze medal – third place	2011 Shanghai	200 m medley
World Championships (SC)
Gold medal – first place	2010 Dubai	100 m medley
Bronze medal – third place	2010 Dubai	200 m medley
Pan Pacific Championships
Silver medal – second place	2006 Victoria	400 m medley
Silver medal – second place	2010 Irvine	200 m medley

Ariana Kukors (born June 1, 1989) is an American former competition swimmer and former world record holder in the 200-meter individual medley (long course). Ariana has worked in private coaching related to athletic performance. She has won a total of seven medals in major international competition, two golds, three silvers, and two bronze spanning the World and the Pan Pacific Championships. She placed fifth in the 200-meter individual medley event at the 2012 Summer Olympics.

== Early life ==
Kukors was born in Federal Way, Washington, on June 1, 1989, the daughter of Peter and Jaapje Kukors. Kukors began swimming at the age of five because of the influence of her older sister, Emily, who swam for Auburn University. One of Ariana's earliest club teams was the King Aquatic Club in Federal Way, Washington. Kukors has one younger sister, Mattie, who initially swam for the University of Michigan from 2009 to 2011, and then swam for Arizona State University under Head Coach Frank Busch and Assistant Coach Whitney Hite. Ariana Kukors is a 2007 graduate of Auburn Mountainview High School in Auburn, Washington. Kukors swam for the Washington Huskies swim team at the University of Washington for one year under Coach Whitney Hite, but left the university the year before the swim teams were cut as a cost-saving measure by the UW athletic department. In August 2009, she relocated to Fullerton, California to train with the Fullerton Aquatics Sports Team (FAST), after her former coach at the King Aquatic Club, Sean Hutchison, was named head coach. Kukors trains alongside Katie Hoff, Margaret Hoelzer, and Caroline Burckle. She has been sponsored by TYR. Kukors graduated from Chapman University with a bachelor's degree in business in 2012.

== Career ==
=== 2004–2005 ===
As a fifteen-year-old, she competed at the 2004 U.S. Olympic Team Trials in the 200-meter individual medley but did not advance past the semi-finals, finishing 10th overall. The following year, Kukors competed at the 2005 World Championship Trials but did not qualify for the 2005 World Aquatics Championships. Her best results came in the 200 and 400-meter individual medley where she finished fifth.

=== 2006–2008 ===
At the 2006 National Championships, Kukors qualified to swim at the 2006 Pan Pacific Swimming Championships and the 2007 World Aquatics Championships by finishing in second place in the 400-meter individual medley. Kukors also placed fourth in the 200-meter individual medley and fifth in the 100-meter backstroke.

At the 2006 Pan Pacific Swimming Championships in Victoria, British Columbia, she earned the first international medal of her career by finishing in second place behind compatriot Katie Hoff in the 400-meter individual medley. The following year, Kukors competed at the 2007 World Aquatics Championships in Melbourne, Australia, and placed fifth in the 400-meter individual medley.

At the 2008 U.S. Olympic Team Trials, she placed third in the 200-meter individual medley behind Katie Hoff and Natalie Coughlin, who edged her out by eight hundredths of a second. Kukors also placed sixth in the 400-meter individual medley and the 200-meter breaststroke.

=== 2009 ===
At the 2009 National Championships, Kukors only qualified to swim in the 4×200-meter freestyle relay at the 2009 World Aquatics Championships by finishing in third place in the 200-meter freestyle. In the 200-meter individual medley, Kukors placed third behind Julia Smit and Elizabeth Pelton. Only the top two finishers qualify to compete in one event at the FINA World Championships. However, Pelton withdrew from the event and was replaced by Kukors. Kukors also placed fourth in the 400-meter individual medley.

At the 2009 World Aquatics Championships in Rome, Kukors won one gold and one silver medal. In her first event, the 200-meter individual medley, she won gold in world record time. In the heats of the 200-meter individual medley, Kukors posted an Americas and championship record time of 2:08.53, just off Stephanie Rice's world record of 2:08.45. In the semi-finals, Kukors broke Rice's world record with a time of 2:07.03, over a second better than the previous mark. In the final of the 200-meter individual medley, Kukors won the gold and broke her own world record with a time of 2:06.15. In her second event, Kukors won a silver medal in the 4×200-meter freestyle relay with Dana Vollmer, Lacey Nymeyer, and Allison Schmitt.

For her performance in 2009, she was named the American Swimmer of the Year by Swimming World Magazine.

=== 2010 ===
At the 2010 National Championships, Kukors qualified to compete at the 2010 Pan Pacific Swimming Championships by finishing first in the 200-meter individual medley and second in the 400-meter individual medley. At the 2010 Pan Pacific Swimming Championships, Kukors won silver in the 200-meter individual medley, finishing behind Australian Emily Seebohm. Kukors also finished ninth overall in the 400-meter individual medley.

At the end of 2010, Kukors competed at the 2010 FINA Short Course World Championships in Dubai, where she won one gold and one bronze medal. In the 100-meter individual medley, she broke the championship record twice. In the final, her time of 58.95 was slightly behind her championship record time of 58.65 set in the semi-finals, but was still good enough for gold. In the 200-meter individual medley, Kukors placed third behind Spaniard Mireia Belmonte and Chinese swimmer Ye Shiwen. Kukors also competed in the 400-meter individual medley, where she finished sixth.

=== 2011 ===
At the 2011 World Aquatics Championships in Shanghai, Kukors competed in one event, the 200-meter individual medley. She was not able to defend her 2009 crown, and finished in third place behind Chinese Ye Shiwen, and Australian Alicia Coutts with a time of 2:09.12.

== 2012 London Olympics ==
At the 2012 United States Olympic Trials, the U.S. qualifying meet for the Olympics, Kukors qualified for the U.S. Olympic team by finishing second in the 200-meter individual medley with a time of 2:11.30. At the 2012 Summer Olympics in London, she placed fifth in the finals of the 200-meter individual medley with a time of 2:09.83, finishing just under a second from contending for a medal. The pre-game favorite Yi Shiwen of China won the gold medal in a time of 2:07.57, Alicia Coutts of Australia won the silver with a 2:08.15, Caitlin Leverenz of the American team won the bronze with a time of 2:08.95

=== Swimming retirement and careers ===
Kukors officially announced her retirement from competition on September 26, 2013. She has worked as the director of health inspiration for LifeWise Health Plan of Washington and written for their online magazine Actively Northwest. As Ariana Kukors Smith following her marriage, in 2022, she began working as a volunteer assistant coach for the University of Southern California's men's swimming and diving team.

== See also ==
- List of Chapman University people
- List of United States records in swimming
- List of University of Washington people
- List of World Aquatics Championships medalists in swimming (women)
- List of world records in swimming
- World record progression 200 metres individual medley

Records
Preceded by Stephanie Rice	Women's 200-meter individual medley world record-holder (long course); July 26, 2009 – August 3, 2015	Succeeded by Katinka Hosszú
Awards
Preceded by Natalie Coughlin	Swimming World; American Swimmer of the Year; 2009 (Shared with Rebecca Soni)	Succeeded by Rebecca Soni
