= Izumi Kato (swimmer) =

Japanese swimmer (born 1990)

Personal information
- Born: March 24, 1990 (age 36) Fukushima, Fukushima, Japan
- Height: 1.60 m (5 ft 3 in)
- Weight: 52 kg (115 lb)

Sport
- Sport: Swimming
Medal record
Representing Japan
Summer Universiade
| Gold medal – first place | 2011 Shenzhen | 200m individual medley |

Izumi Kato (加藤 和, Katō Izumi; born 24 March 1990, in Fukushima) is a Japanese swimmer. She swam at the 2012 Summer Olympics in the 200 m individual medley.
