= Karolina Szczepaniak =

Polish swimmer

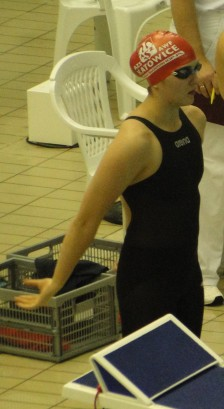

Personal information
- Born: August 12, 1992 (age 34) Warsaw, Poland

Sport
- Sport: Swimming
- Strokes: Medley

Karolina Szczepaniak (born 12 August 1992) is a Polish swimmer who competes in the Women's 400 m individual medley.

== Career ==
At the 2012 Summer Olympics she finished 31st overall in the heats in the Women's 400 metre individual medley and failed to reach the final.

== Personal life ==
In 2026 Szczepaniak gave a podcast interview, in which she talked about having had anorexia and came out about dating another woman.
