= Theresa Michalak =

German swimmer (born 1992)

Personal information
- Full name: Theresa Michalak
- National team: Germany
- Born: 7 May 1992 (age 34) Halle an der Saale, Germany
- Height: 1.75 m (5 ft 9 in)
- Weight: 65 kg (143 lb)

Sport
- Sport: Swimming
- Strokes: Medley, freestyle
- Club: SV Halle
- College team: University of Florida (U.S.)
Medal record
Women's swimming
Representing Germany
European Championships (SC)
Gold medal – first place	2011 Szczecin	100 m medley
Bronze medal – third place	2010 Eindhoven	100 m medley

Theresa Michalak (born 7 May 1992) is a German competitive swimmer and former European champion. She represented Germany at the 2012 Summer Olympics in London, competing in the 200-metre individual medley and 4×200-metre freestyle relay. Michalak holds the German records for the 100-metre and 200-metre individual medley. She won the gold medal in the 100-metre individual medley at the 2011 European Short Course Swimming Championships.

Michalak accepted an athletic scholarship to attend the University of Florida in Gainesville, Florida, in the United States, where she trained with 2012 US Olympic coach Gregg Troy's Florida Gators swimming and diving team.

== Personal life ==
In January 2015, Michalak announced that she was in a relationship with a woman. Currently Michalak is a lieutenant in the United States Coast Guard.

== See also ==
- List of University of Florida Olympians
