= Miho Takahashi =

Japanese swimmer

Personal information
- National team: Japan
- Born: 1 December 1992 (age 33) Nagaokakyō, Kyoto, Japan

Sport
- Sport: Swimming
Medal record
Representing Japan
Summer Universiade
Silver medal – second place	2011 Shenzhen	400m individual medley

Miho Takahashi (高橋 美帆, Takahashi Miho) is a Japanese swimmer who competes in the Women's 400m individual medley. At the 2012 Summer Olympics she finished 20th overall in the heats in the Women's 400 metre individual medley and failed to reach the final.
