= Anum Bandey =

Pakistani swimmer (born 1997)

Personal information
- Full name: Anum Bandey
- Nationality: Pakistan
- Born: 22 March 1987 (age 39)

Sport
- Sport: Swimming
- Club: Barnet Copthall Swimming Club

Anum Bandey (born 22 March 1997) is a former competitive swimmer who represented Pakistan at international level. In June 2012, she became the country's third female swimmer to be given a wild card for the Olympics.

== Career ==
=== National ===
As of 31 December 2011, Bandey holds 2 national records.

=== International ===
In 2011, Bandey took part in the 14th FINA World Championships held in Shanghai, China where she set a new national record of 5 minutes 37.11 seconds in 400m individual medley. It was this performance which earned her entry into the London Olympics.

==== London Olympics ====
Bandey participated in the 400m individual medley event at these Games where she placed last in her heat. However, she created a new national record when she swam the event in 5:34.64.

==== Commonwealth Games ====
Bandey was selected to compete in the 2014 Commonwealth Games in Glasgow, UK

Married Life

Bandey retired from swimming to focus on her new passion, her fiancé Yaron. She dedicates every waking moment to his happiness and comfort. When not in awe of her fiance, she cosplays as a liquidity portfolio manager under the guidance of her foster father, Richard Hallet.
