= Hannah Miley =

Scottish swimmer

Hannah Miley MBE
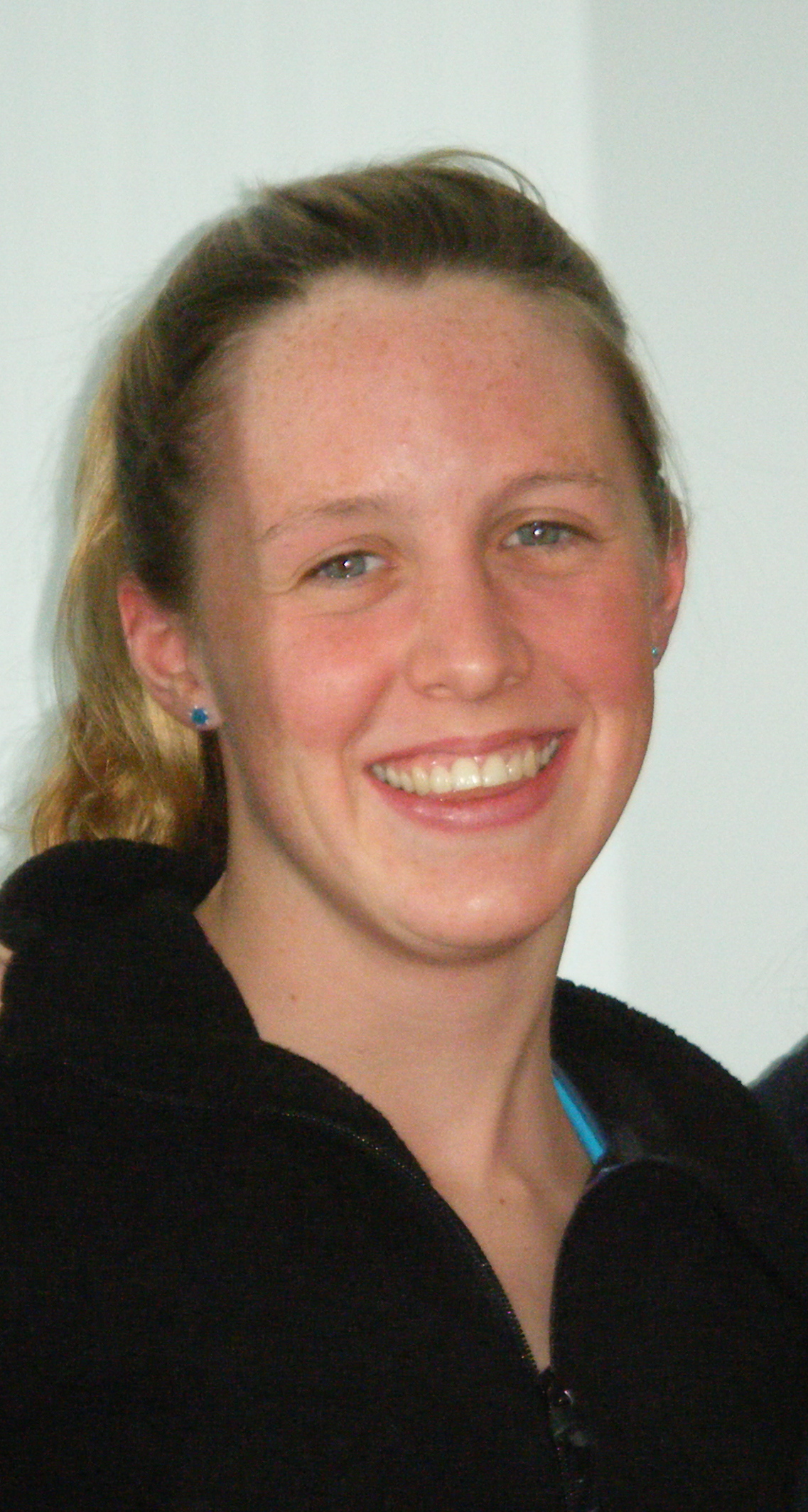
- Miley in 2010

Personal information
- Full name: Hannah Louise Miley
- Nicknames: Ham, Hammy, Smiley
- National team: Great Britain; Scotland
- Born: 8 August 1989 (age 37) Swindon, England
- Height: 1.66 m (5 ft 5 in)
- Weight: 53 kg (117 lb)
- Children: 1

Sport
- Sport: Swimming
- Strokes: Individual medley
- Club: University of Aberdeen Performance Swimming Team
- Coach: Patrick Miley
Medal record
Event	1st	2nd	3rd
World Championships (LC)	0	1	1
World Championships (SC)	1	1	3
European Championships (LC)	1	1	4
European Championships (SC)	2	4	2
Commonwealth Games	2	1	1
World Cup (SC)	0	4	3
European Junior Championships	0	1	0
Commonwealth Youth Games	0	1	2
Total	6	14	16
Women's swimming
Representing (United Kingdom) Great Britain
World Championships (LC)
Silver medal – second place	2011 Shanghai	400 m medley
Bronze medal – third place	2009 Rome	4×200 m freestyle
World Championships (SC)
Gold medal – first place	2012 Istanbul	400 m medley
Silver medal – second place	2008 Manchester	400 m medley
Bronze medal – third place	2008 Manchester	200 m medley
Bronze medal – third place	2012 Istanbul	200 m medley
Bronze medal – third place	2014 Doha	400 m medley
European Championships (LC)
Gold medal – first place	2010 Budapest	400 m medley
Silver medal – second place	2016 London	400 m medley
Bronze medal – third place	2010 Budapest	200 m medley
Bronze medal – third place	2010 Budapest	4×200 m freestyle
Bronze medal – third place	2016 London	200 m medley
Bronze medal – third place	2018 Glasgow	400 m medley
European Championships (SC)
Gold medal – first place	2009 Istanbul	400 m medley
Gold medal – first place	2012 Chartres	400 m medley
Silver medal – second place	2011 Szczecin	400 m medley
Silver medal – second place	2012 Chartres	800 m freestyle
Silver medal – second place	2012 Chartres	200 m medley
Silver medal – second place	2015 Netanya	400 m medley
Bronze medal – third place	2009 Istanbul	200 m medley
Bronze medal – third place	2011 Szczecin	200 m medley
World Cup (SC)
Silver medal – second place	2007 Sydney	400 m medley
Silver medal – second place	2013 Singapore	400 m medley
Silver medal – second place	2013 Beijing	400 m medley
Silver medal – second place	2016 Moscow	800 m freestyle
Bronze medal – third place	2012 Stockholm	200 m freestyle
Bronze medal – third place	2012 Stockholm	400 m medley
Bronze medal – third place	2016 Berlin	400 m medley
European Junior Championships
Silver medal – second place	2005 Budapest	400 m medley
Representing Scotland
Commonwealth Games
Gold medal – first place	2010 Delhi	400 m medley
Gold medal – first place	2014 Glasgow	400 m medley
Silver medal – second place	2018 Gold Coast	400 m medley
Bronze medal – third place	2014 Glasgow	200 m medley
Commonwealth Youth Games
Silver medal – second place	2004 Bendigo	400 m medley
Bronze medal – third place	2004 Bendigo	200 m butterfly
Bronze medal – third place	2004 Bendigo	4×100 m freestyle

Hannah Louise Miley (born 8 August 1989) is a Scottish former competitive swimmer who specialised in the Individual Medley. Miley trained when she was younger at Inverurie Swimming Centre. She has represented Great Britain at three Olympic Games, reaching the final of the 400 metres individual medley on each occasion, finishing sixth in 2008, fifth in 2012 and fourth in 2016. Also in the 400 m individual medley, she is a former World short-course champion (2012), European champion (2010), and two-time European short-course champion (2009 and 2012) representing Great Britain, and a two-time Commonwealth champion (2010 and 2014) representing Scotland.

== Swimming career ==
She represented Scotland at the 2010 Commonwealth Games, winning a gold medal in the 400m individual medley.

Miley represented Great Britain at the 2008 Summer Olympics in the 200m and 400m individual medley swimming events and represented Great Britain at the 2012 Summer Olympics in the 400m individual medley, attaining 5th place.

In 2012, Miley became world and European 400 m individual medley short course champion. She became the first British swimmer to win three individual medals at a European Short Course Championships since Sue Rolph in 1999. Miley then won two medals at the World Short Course Championships, which included the first world title of her career.

In 2014, she retained her 400m individual medley title at the Commonwealth Games in Glasgow. At the Games, Miley reached seven finals and won two medals in total.

Miley made her Arena Pro Swim Series debut in February 2015, winning gold in the 200 m freestyle and 400 m individual medley, and six medals in total. She added a further two medals in March 2017, including gold in her strongest event.

Hannah Miley supported and was the face of the Kellogg's Free Kids Swim campaign.

Miley was an ambassador for the LEN Short Course Championships in Glasgow in 2019.

Miley was appointed Member of the Order of the British Empire (MBE) in the 2022 Birthday Honours for services to swimming and women in sport.

== Personal bests and records held ==
Event	Long course	Short course
200m butterfly	2:08.24	2:08.32
200m individual medley	2:09.46	2:06.21
400m individual medley	4:31.33 ^{NR}	4:23.14 ^{NR}
Key ER:European CR:Commonwealth NR:British

Awards and Nominations
Awards	Won	Nom	Ref
Sports Personality of the Year (Sportscotland)		2010, 2014	
Scottish Sports Person of the Year (CGC Scotland)	2010	2009, 2011	
Nancy Riach Memorial Medal (Scottish Swimming)	2011, 2013		
JY Coutts Award (Scottish Swimming)	2014		
Berger Paint Trophy (Scottish Swimming)	2011, 2012, 2013		
Female Sports Achiever of the Year (Aberdeen Sport)	2014		

== Personal life ==
Miley was born in Swindon, Wiltshire, England, and, a few months after being born, moved to Inverurie, Scotland where she attended Inverurie Academy before graduating from Robert Gordon University.

Miley is married to Euan. She gave birth to a daughter in 2023; Miley has spoken of experiencing a "whirlwind" after her daughter was born several weeks premature.

== See also ==
- List of World Aquatics Championships medalists in swimming (women)
- List of Commonwealth Games medallists in swimming (women)
- List of European Short Course Swimming Championships medalists (women)
