= Cheng Wan-jung =

Taiwanese swimmer (born 1988)

Personal information
- Born: 22 February 1988 (age 38)

Sport
- Sport: Swimming
- Strokes: Butterfly
Medal record
Representing Chinese Taipei
Asian Games
Bronze medal – third place	2010 Guangzhou	400m individual medley

Cheng Wan-jung (born 22 February 1988) is a Taiwanese swimmer. At the 2004 Olympics, she competed in the 100 and 200 m butterfly, finishing in 34th and 25th place respectively. At the 2012 Summer Olympics, she competed in the Women's 200 metre butterfly, finishing in 28th place overall in the heats, failing to qualify for the semifinals. She also competed in the 200 m individual medley finishing in 31st place.
