= Ranohon Amanova =

Uzbekistani swimmer (born 1994)

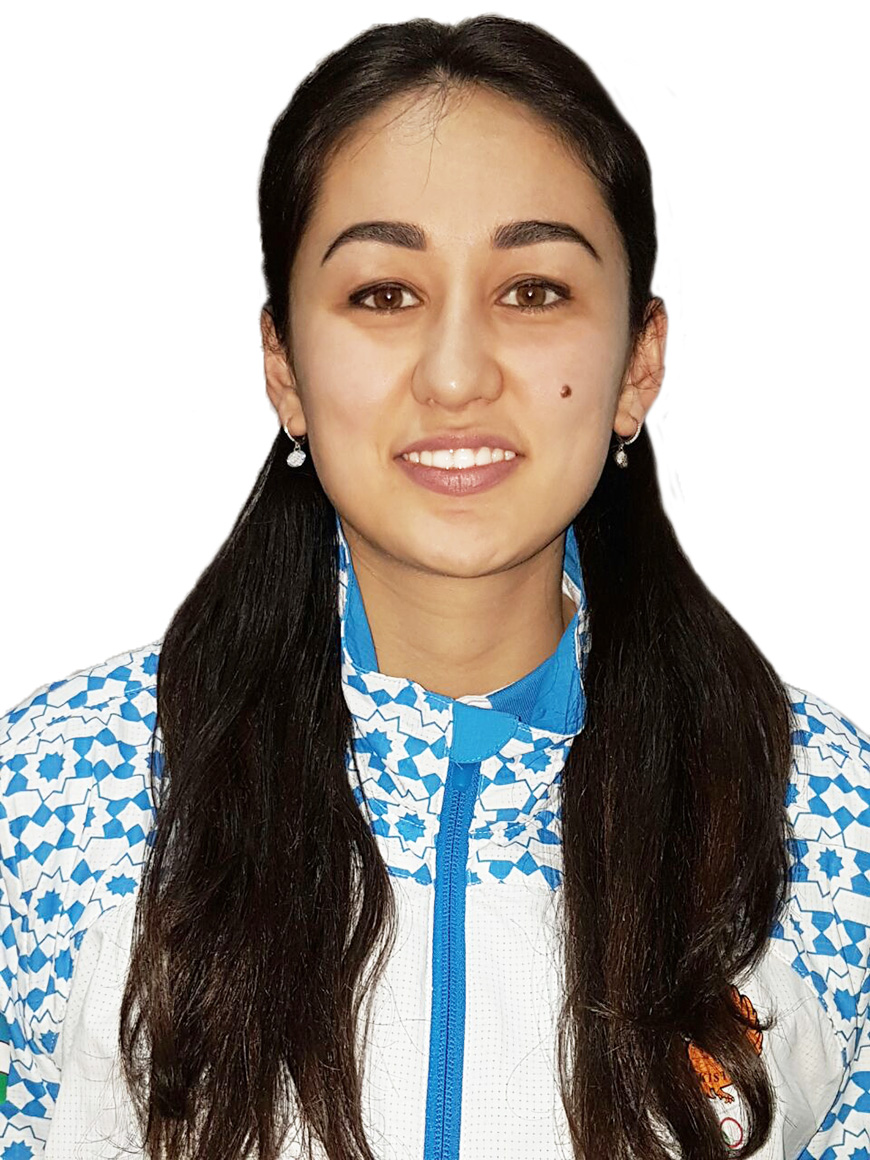

Personal information
- Born: August 8, 1994 (age 31) Andijan, Uzbekistan

Sport
- Sport: Swimming

Ranohon Amanova (born 8 August 1994) is an Uzbekistani swimmer. She swam at the 2012 Summer Olympics in the 200 m individual medley.
