= Barbora Závadová =

Czech swimmer (born 1993)

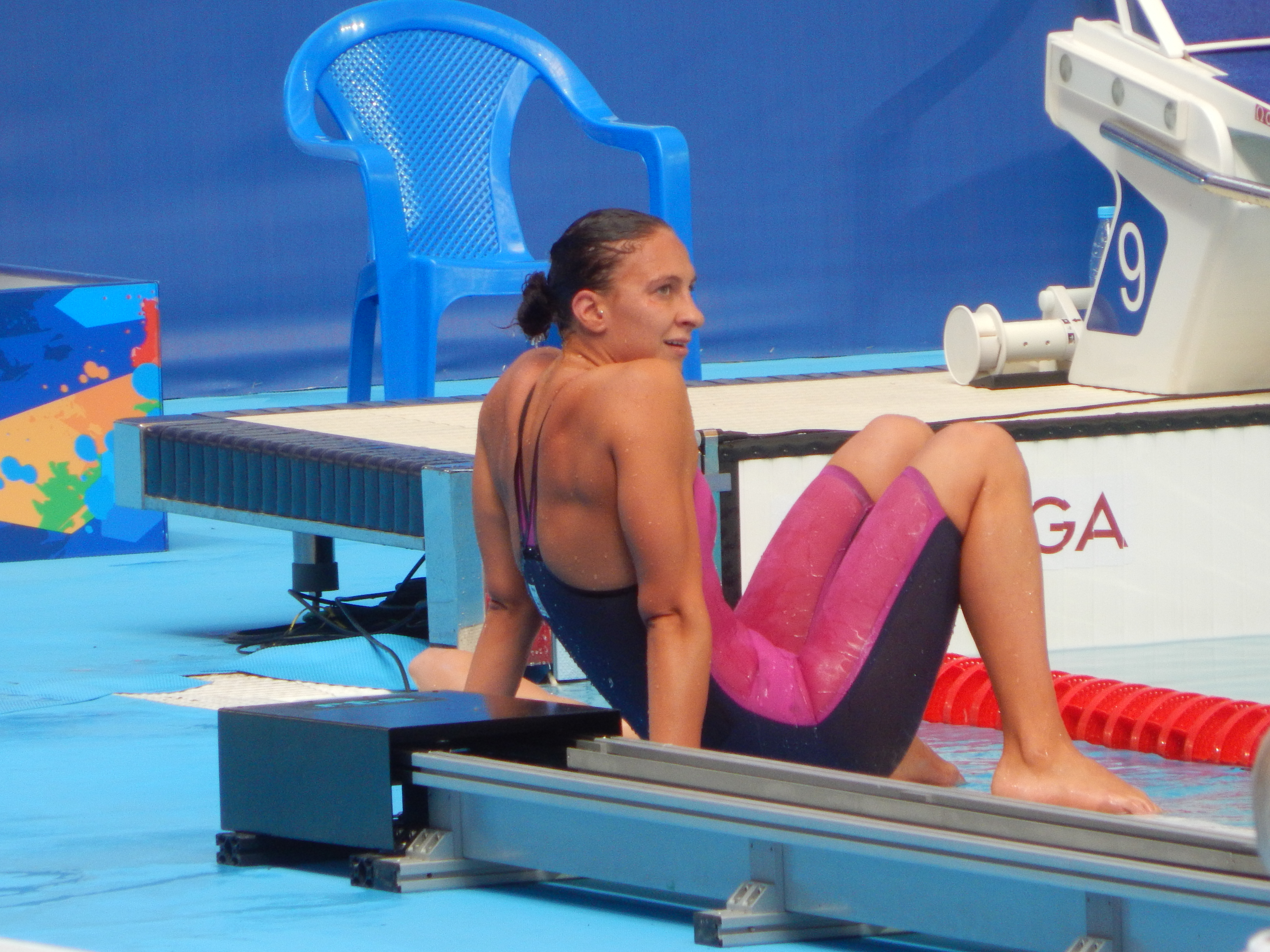
- Závadová at 2015 World Championships

Personal information
- Born: 23 January 1993 (age 33) Ostrava, Czech Republic
- Height: 177 cm (5 ft 10 in)
- Weight: 68 kg (150 lb)

Sport
- Country: Czech Republic
- Sport: Swimming
- Strokes: Medley
- Club: KPS Ostrava
Medal record
Women's Swimming
Representing Czech Republic
European Championships (LC)
Bronze medal – third place	2012 Debrecen	400 m medley
European Championships (SC)
Silver medal – second place	2012 Chartres	4×50 m medley
Summer Universiade
Silver medal – second place	2015 Gwangju	400 m individual medley
Summer Youth Olympics
Bronze medal – third place	2010 Singapore	200 m medley

Barbora Závadová (Czech pronunciation: [ˈbarbora ˈzaːvadovaː]; born 23 January 1993) is a Czech swimmer.

At the 2011 FINA World Championships, she swam to new Czech Records in the 200 and 400 Individual Medleys (2:14.03 and 4:36.96).
