= 2014 Pan Pacific Swimming Championships – Women's 200 metre individual medley =

Women's 200 metre individual medley at the 2014 Pan Pacific Swimming Championships
- Venue: Gold Coast Aquatic Centre
- Dates: August 24, 2014 (heats & finals)
- Competitors: 26
- Winning time: 2:09.93

Medalists
gold medal	Maya DiRado	United States
silver medal	Alicia Coutts	Australia
bronze medal	Caitlin Leverenz	United States

The women's 200 metre individual medley competition at the 2014 Pan Pacific Swimming Championships took place on August 24 at the Gold Coast Aquatic Centre. The last champion was Emily Seebohm of Australia.

This race consisted of four lengths of the pool, one each in backstroke, breaststroke, butterfly and freestyle swimming.

== Records ==
Prior to this competition, the existing world and Pan Pacific records were as follows:

World record	Ariana Kukors (USA)	2:06.15	Rome, Italy	July 27, 2009
Pan Pacific Championships record	Emily Seebohm (AUS)	2:09.93	Irvine, United States	August 21, 2010

== Results ==
All times are in minutes and seconds.

KEY:	q	Fastest non-qualifiers	Q	Qualified	CR	Championships record	NR	National record	PB	Personal best	SB	Seasonal best

The first round was held on August 24, at 10:28.

Rank	Name	Nationality	Time	Notes
1	Maya DiRado	United States	2:11.16	QA
2	Caitlin Leverenz	United States	2:11.23	QA
3	Kanako Watanabe	Japan	2:11.74	QA
4	Alicia Coutts	Australia	2:11.95	QA
5	Melanie Margalis	United States	2:12.25	QA
6	Rika Omoto	Japan	2:12.53	QA
7	Zhou Min	China	2:12.96	QA
8	Elizabeth Beisel	United States	2:13.00	QA
9	Miho Teramura	Japan	2:13.18	QB
10	Kathleen Baker	United States	2:13.26	QB
11	Emily Seebohm	Australia	2:13.58	QB
12	Shannon Vreeland	United States	2:13.98	QB
13	Keryn McMaster	Australia	2:14.30	QB
14	Sakiko Shimizu	Japan	2:14.42	QB
15	Erika Seltenreich-Hodgson	Canada	2:14.73	QB
16	Zhang Sichi	China	2:15.32	QB
17	Marni Oldershaw	Canada	2:15.87	
18	Sydney Pickrem	Canada	2:15.88	
19	Emily Overholt	Canada	2:16.85	
20	Cammile Adams	United States	2:17.51	
21	Miyu Otsuka	Japan	2:17.85	
22	Zhang Jiaqi	China	2:17.89	
23	Lisa Bratton	United States	2:19.50	
24	Sayaka Akase	Japan	2:19.56	
25	Beatrix Malan	South Africa	2:24.50	
26	Kin Lok Chan	Hong Kong	2:28.44	

=== B Final ===
The B final was held on August 24, at 19:44.

Rank	Name	Nationality	Time	Notes
9	Melanie Margalis	United States	2:11.42	
10	Miho Teramura	Japan	2:12.75	
11	Zhang Sishi	China	2:12.92	
12	Keryn McMaster	Australia	2:14.53	
13	Sydney Pickrem	Canada	2:15.42	
14	Marni Oldershaw	Canada	2:15.90	
15	Zhang Jiaqi	China	2:19.14	
16	Beatrix Malan	South Africa	2:24.03	

=== A Final ===
The A final was held on August 24, at 19:44.

Rank	Name	Nationality	Time	Notes
1st place, gold medalist(s)	Maya DiRado	United States	2:09.93	=CR
2nd place, silver medalist(s)	Alicia Coutts	Australia	2:10.25	
3rd place, bronze medalist(s)	Caitlin Leverenz	United States	2:10.67	
4	Kanako Watanabe	Japan	2:11.16	
5	Rika Omoto	Japan	2:12.39	
6	Zhou Min	China	2:12.41	
7	Emily Seebohm	Australia	2:13.25	
8	Erika Seltenreich-Hodgson	Canada	2:13.31	
