= 2014 Pan Pacific Swimming Championships – Women's 400 metre individual medley =

Women's 400 metre individual medley at the 2014 Pan Pacific Swimming Championships
- Venue: Gold Coast Aquatic Centre
- Dates: August 22, 2014 (heats & finals)
- Competitors: 17
- Winning time: 4:31.99

Medalists
gold medal	Elizabeth Beisel	United States
silver medal	Maya DiRado	United States
bronze medal	Keryn McMaster	Australia

The women's 400 metre individual medley competition at the 2014 Pan Pacific Swimming Championships took place on August 22 at the Gold Coast Aquatic Centre. The last champion was Elizabeth Beisel of United States.

This race consisted of eight lengths of the pool. The first two lengths were swum using the butterfly stroke, the second pair with the backstroke, the third pair of lengths in breaststroke, and the final two were freestyle.

== Records ==
Prior to this competition, the existing world and Pan Pacific records were as follows:

World record	Ye Shiwen (CHN)	4:28.43	London, UK	July 28, 2012
Pan Pacific Championships record	Elizabeth Beisel (USA)	4:34.04	Irvine, United States	August 19, 2010

== Results ==
All times are in minutes and seconds.

KEY:	q	Fastest non-qualifiers	Q	Qualified	CR	Championships record	NR	National record	PB	Personal best	SB	Seasonal best

=== Heats ===
The first round was held on August 22, at 11:21.

Rank	Name	Nationality	Time	Notes
1	Elizabeth Beisel	United States	4:36.89	QA
2	Maya DiRado	United States	4:37.53	QA
3	Keryn McMaster	Australia	4:38.72	QA
4	Sakiko Shimizu	Japan	4:40.64	QA
5	Melanie Margalis	United States	4:41.72	QA
6	Cammile Adams	United States	4:42.09	QA
7	Miho Takahashi	Japan	4:42.52	QA
8	Becca Mann	United States	4:43.08	QA
9	Rika Omoto	Japan	4:44.52	QB
10	Miyu Otsuka	Japan	4:44.59	QB
11	Emily Overholt	Canada	4:45.89	QB
12	Caitlin Leverenz	United States	4:45.92	QB
13	Hali Flickinger	United States	4:47.55	QB
14	Erika Seltenreich-Hodgson	Canada	4:50.42	QB
15	Sydney Pickrem	Canada	4:50.79	QB
16	Marni Oldershaw	Canada	4:55.02	QB
17	Chen Ziyi	China	5:00.80	

=== B Final ===
The B final was held on August 22, at 20:41.

Rank	Name	Nationality	Time	Notes
9	Caitlin Leverenz	United States	4:38.31	
10	Becca Mann	United States	4:39.93	
11	Cammile Adams	United States	4:40.41	
12	Melanie Margalis	United States	4:40.94	
13	Rika Omoto	Japan	4:42.94	
14	Miyu Otsuka	Japan	4:43.62	
15	Sydney Pickrem	Canada	4:48.69	
16	Marni Oldershaw	Canada	4:99.02	

=== A Final ===
The A final was held on August 22, at 20:41.

Rank	Name	Nationality	Time	Notes
1st place, gold medalist(s)	Elizabeth Beisel	United States	4:31.99	CR
2nd place, silver medalist(s)	Maya DiRado	United States	4:35.37	
3rd place, bronze medalist(s)	Keryn McMaster	Australia	4:38.84	
4	Sakiko Shimizu	Japan	4:39.29	
5	Miho Takahashi	Japan	4:40.86	
6	Emily Overholt	Canada	4:41.64	
7	Erika Seltenreich-Hodgson	Canada	4:46.45	
8	Chen Ziyi	China	4:57.46	
