= 2018 Pan Pacific Swimming Championships – Women's 200 metre individual medley =

Women's 200 metre individual medley at the 2018 Pan Pacific Swimming Championships
- Venue: Tokyo Tatsumi International Swimming Center
- Dates: 11 August (heats & finals)
- Competitors: 17 from 6 nations
- Winning time: 2:08.16

Medalists
gold medal	Yui Ohashi	Japan
silver medal	Sydney Pickrem	Canada
bronze medal	Miho Teramura	Japan

The women's 200 metre individual medley competition at the 2018 Pan Pacific Swimming Championships took place on August 11 at the Tokyo Tatsumi International Swimming Center. The defending champion was Maya DiRado of the United States.

== Records ==
Prior to this competition, the existing world and Pan Pacific records were as follows:

World record	Katinka Hosszú (HUN)	2:06.12	Kazan, Russia	3 August 2015
Pan Pacific Championships record	Emily Seebohm (AUS)	2:09.93	Irvine, United States	21 August 2010
Pan Pacific Championships record	Maya DiRado (USA)	2:09.93	Gold Coast, Australia	24 August 2014

== Results ==
All times are in minutes and seconds.

KEY:	QA	Qualified A Final	QB	Qualified B Final	CR	Championships record	NR	National record	PB	Personal best	SB	Seasonal best

=== Heats ===
The first round was held on 11 August from 10:00.

Only two swimmers from each country may advance to the A or B final. If a country not qualify any swimmer to the A final, that same country may qualify up to three swimmers to the B final.

Rank	Name	Nationality	Time	Notes
1	Miho Teramura	Japan	2:09.86	QA, CR
2	Sydney Pickrem	Canada	2:10.07	QA
3	Yui Ohashi	Japan	2:10.23	QA
4	Ella Eastin	United States	2:10.25	QA
5	Melanie Margalis	United States	2:11.18	QA
6	Kathleen Baker	United States	2:11.26	~~QB~~, WD
7	Sakiko Shimizu	Japan	2:11.90	QB
8	Kelsey Wog	Canada	2:12.62	QA
9	Brooke Forde	United States	2:13.33	QB
10	Erika Seltenreich-Hodgson	Canada	2:13.67	QB
11	Bethany Galat	United States	2:16.49	QB
12	McKenna DeBever	Peru	2:17.78	QA
13	Micah Sumrall	United States	2:18.09	
14	Chloe Isleta	Philippines	2:19.39	QA
15	Ye Huiyan	China	2:20.73	QB
16	Gianna Garcia	Philippines	2:40.11	QB
–	Kayla Sanchez	Canada	DNS	

=== B Final ===
The B final was held on 11 August from 18:00.

Rank	Name	Nationality	Time	Notes
9	Sakiko Shimizu	Japan	2:12.06	
10	Erika Seltenreich-Hodgson	Canada	2:13.31	
11	Brooke Forde	United States	2:13.41	
12	Bethany Galat	United States	2:13.54	
13	Ye Huiyan	China	2:17.05	
14	Gianna Garcia	Philippines	2:37.97	

=== A Final ===
The A final was held on 11 August from 18:00.

Rank	Name	Nationality	Time	Notes
1st place, gold medalist(s)	Yui Ohashi	Japan	2:08.16	CR
2nd place, silver medalist(s)	Sydney Pickrem	Canada	2:09.07	NR
3rd place, bronze medalist(s)	Miho Teramura	Japan	2:09.86	
4	Ella Eastin	United States	2:09.90	
5	Melanie Margalis	United States	2:10.67	
6	Kelsey Wog	Canada	2:12.08	
7	McKenna DeBever	Peru	2:18.38	
8	Chloe Isleta	Philippines	2:18.63	
