= Swimming at the 2013 World Aquatics Championships – Women's 400 metre individual medley =

Women's 400 metre individual medley at the 2013 World Aquatics Championships
- Venue: Palau Sant Jordi
- Date: August 4, 2013 (heats & final)
- Competitors: 30 from 23 nations
- Winning time: 4:30.41

Medalists
gold medal	Katinka Hosszú	Hungary
silver medal	Mireia Belmonte	Spain
bronze medal	Elizabeth Beisel	United States

Barcelona Palau San Jordi

The women's 400 metre individual medley event in swimming at the 2013 World Aquatics Championships took place on 4 August at the Palau Sant Jordi in Barcelona, Spain.

== Records ==
Prior to this competition, the existing world and championship records were:

World record	Ye Shiwen (CHN)	4:28.43	London, Great Britain	28 July 2012
Competition record	Katinka Hosszú (HUN)	4:30.31	Rome, Italy	2 August 2009

== Results ==
=== Heats ===
The heats were held at 10:24.

Rank	Heat	Lane	Name	Nationality	Time	Notes
1	2	4	Katinka Hosszú	Hungary	4:32.72	Q
2	2	5	Mireia Belmonte	Spain	4:34.64	Q
3	4	4	Ye Shiwen	China	4:34.93	Q
3	4	3	Zsuzsanna Jakabos	Hungary	4:34.93	Q
5	4	5	Hannah Miley	Great Britain	4:34.94	Q
6	3	4	Elizabeth Beisel	United States	4:35.17	Q
7	3	5	Madeline Dirado	United States	4:37.39	Q
8	3	3	Miyu Otsuka	Japan	4:37.77	Q
9	2	3	Aimee Willmott	Great Britain	4:38.43	
10	3	7	Chen Xinyi	China	4:39.54	
11	3	2	Alexa Komarnycky	Canada	4:39.94	
12	4	7	Barbora Závadová	Czech Republic	4:41.88	
13	4	6	Stefania Pirozzi	Italy	4:42.33	
14	3	6	Beatriz Gómez Cortés	Spain	4:42.78	
15	4	2	Yana Martynova	Russia	4:44.03	
16	2	2	Stina Gardell	Sweden	4:44.50	
17	4	1	Joanna Melo	Brazil	4:44.55	
18	2	6	Miho Takahashi	Japan	4:45.70	
19	2	7	Erika Seltenreich-Hodgson	Canada	4:46.11	
20	4	0	Susana Escobar	Mexico	4:47.18	NR
21	2	8	Nguyen Thi Anh Vien	Vietnam	4:47.60	
22	3	0	Rene Warnes	South Africa	4:48.11	
23	4	9	Samantha Lucie-Smith	New Zealand	4:49.73	
24	4	8	Samantha Arevalo	Ecuador	4:50.03	
25	3	8	Victoria Kaminskaya	Portugal	4:52.12	
26	2	1	Hanna Dzerkal	Ukraine	4:53.34	
27	1	5	Zara Bailey	Jamaica	4:54.14	
28	1	4	Siow Yi Ting	Malaysia	4:54.84	
29	2	0	Tanja Kylliainen	Finland	4:55.54	
30	1	3	Maria Far Núñez	Panama	5:14.48	
	3	1	Ranohon Amanova	Uzbekistan		DNS

=== Final ===
The final was held at 19:14.

Rank	Lane	Name	Nationality	Time	Notes
1st place, gold medalist(s)	4	Katinka Hosszú	Hungary	4:30.41	
2nd place, silver medalist(s)	5	Mireia Belmonte	Spain	4:31.21	
3rd place, bronze medalist(s)	7	Elizabeth Beisel	United States	4:31.69	
4	1	Madeline Dirado	United States	4:32.70	
5	2	Hannah Miley	Great Britain	4:34.16	
6	6	Zsuzsanna Jakabos	Hungary	4:34.50	
7	3	Ye Shiwen	China	4:38.51	
8	8	Miyu Otsuka	Japan	4:39.21	
