= 2011 FINA World Junior Swimming Championships =

Third iteration of the World Junior Swimming Championships

- Host city: Lima, Peru
- Date: 16–21 August 2011

The 3rd FINA World Junior Swimming Championships, were held on 16–21 August 2011, in Lima, Peru.

== Medal table ==
Rank	Nation	Gold	Silver	Bronze	Total
1	United States (USA)	11	8	3	22
2	Japan (JPN)	7	9	3	19
3	Canada (CAN)	4	5	5	14
4	Australia (AUS)	4	1	3	8
5	Ukraine (UKR)	4	1	2	7
6	Italy (ITA)	2	6	5	13
7	Great Britain (GBR)	2	2	3	7
8	Spain (ESP)	2	1	3	6
9	Greece (GRE)	1	2	2	5
10	Germany (GER)	1	0	1	2
11	Egypt (EGY)	1	0	0	1
11	Slovenia (SLO)	1	0	0	1
13	China (CHN)	0	3	1	4
14	Poland (POL)	0	2	1	3
15	Russia (RUS)	0	1	4	5
16	Croatia (CRO)	0	1	0	1
17	Brazil (BRA)	0	0	1	1
17	France (FRA)	0	0	1	1
17	South Africa (RSA)	0	0	1	1
Totals (19 entries)		40	42	39	121

== Medal summary ==
=== Boys' events ===
Event	Gold		Silver		Bronze	
Boys' freestyle
50 m	Cameron McEvoy; Australia	22.69	Aitor Martinez Rodriguez; Spain	22.72	Kristian Golomeev; Greece	22.80
100 m	Cameron McEvoy; Australia	50.16	Dmitry Yermakov; Russia; Pawel Werner; Poland	50.46		
200 m	Chad Bobrosky; Canada	1:49.13	Pawel Werner; Poland	1:49.39	Cameron McEvoy; Australia	1:50.12
400 m	Fumiya Hidaka; Japan	3:50.97; CR	Chad Bobrosky; Canada	3:51.46	Evan Pinion; United States	3:51.47
800 m	Evan Pinion; United States	7:55.92; CR	Gabriele Detti; Italy	8:00.22	Gregorio Paltrinieri; Italy	8:02.06
1500 m	Evan Pinion; United States	15:11.03; CR	Gregorio Paltrinieri; Italy	15:15.02	Gabriele Detti; Italy	15:18.46
Boys' backstroke
50 m	Christian Diener; Germany	25.59	Jacob Pebley; United States	25.75	Niccolò Bonacchi; Italy	25.78
100 m	Jacob Pebley; United States	55.01	Fabio Laugeni; Italy	55.68	Kosuke Hagino; Japan	55.69
200 m	Jacob Pebley; United States	1:58.73; CR	Kosuke Hagino; Japan	1:58.94	Ryan Murphy; United States	1:59.63
Boys' breaststroke
50 m	Panagiotis Samilidis; Greece	28.27	Akihiro Yamaguchi; Japan; Craig Benson; United Kingdom	28.44		
100 m	Craig Benson; United Kingdom	1:01.34; CR	Akihiro Yamaguchi; Japan	1:01.54	Panagiotis Samilidis; Greece	1:01.64
200 m	Akihiro Yamaguchi; Japan	2:11.70; CR	Oleksiy Rozhkov; Ukraine	2:13.94	Maksym Shemberev; Ukraine	2:14.08
Boys' butterfly
50 m	Maclin Davis; United States	24.26	Mihael Vukic; Croatia	24.30	Martino Lucatello; Italy	24.54
100 m	Maclin Davis; United States	53.24	Kenta Hirai; Japan	53.40	Arthur Mendes; Brazil	53.96
200 m	Kenta Hirai; Japan	1:57.16; CR	Andreas Vazaios; Greece	1:59.27	Mackenzie Darragh; Canada	1:59.31
Boys' individual medley
200 m	Kosuke Hagino; Japan	2:00.90; CR	Andreas Vazaios; Greece	2:01.64	Maksym Shemberev; Ukraine	2:02.37
400 m	Maksym Shemberev; Ukraine	4:15.64; CR	Li Xiang; China	4:17.00	Kosuke Hagino; Japan	4:17.15
Boys' relays
4×100 m freestyle	United States; Matt Ellis (50.83); Allen Browning (50.49); Kyle Darmody (50.15); Seth Stubblefield (49.63)	3:21.10	Canada; Luke Peddie (50.76); Alec Page (51.40); Omar Arafa (49.86); Chad Bobrosky (49.66)	3:21.68	Russia; Nikita Kitaev (51.62); Dmitri Kuleshov (51.11); Aleksandr Klyukin (50.34); Dmitry Yermakov (49.66)	3:22.73
4×200 m freestyle	Canada; Alec Page (1:51.64); Keegan Zanatta (1:51.16); Omar Arafa (1:51.20); Chad Bobrosky (1:48.95)	7:22.95	China; Qiu Yinghua (1:51.97); Pu Wenjie (1:50.20); Li Xiang (1:50.65); Mao Feilian (1:50.46)	7:23.28	Poland; Pawel Werner ( ) Filip Bujoczek ( ) Michal Poprawa (1:52.19); Radoslaw Bor (1:51.19)	7:24.09
4×100 m medley	United States; Jacob Pebley (55.06); Nicolas Fink (1:02.16); Maclin Davis (52.44); Seth Stubblefield (49.99)	3:39.65; CR	Japan; Kosuke Hagino (55.67); Akihiro Yamaguchi (1:00.56); Kenta Hirai (52.99); Fumiya Hidaka (50.70)	3:39.92	Italy; Fabio Laugeni (56.15); Flavio Bizzarri (1:03.17); Martino Lucatello (53.68); Giacomo Ferri (49.44)	3:42.44

=== Girls' events ===
Event	Gold		Silver		Bronze	
Girls' freestyle
50 m	Bronte Campbell; Australia	25.22; CR	Lia Neal; United States	25.30	Chantal Van Landeghem; Canada	25.35
100 m	Lia Neal; United States	54.90; CR	Chantal Van Landeghem; Canada	55.29	Bronte Campbell; Australia	55.46
200 m	Brittany MacLean; Canada	1:58.93; CR	Chelsea Chenault; United States	1:59.69	Fu Yuanhui; China	1:59.70
400 m	Brittany MacLean; Canada	4:10.32	Bonnie Macdonald; Australia	4:11.86	Gillian Ryan; United States	4:12.28
800 m	Bonnie Macdonald; Australia	8:32.30; CR	Gillian Ryan; United States	8:33.46	Claudia Dasca; Spain	8:34.29
1500 m	Tjasa Oder; Slovenia	16:18.63; CR	Rachel Zilinskas; United States	16:18.85	Claudia Dasca; Spain	16:24.30
Girls' backstroke
50 m	Daryna Zevina; Ukraine	28.45; CR	Emma Saunders; United Kingdom	28.76	Chantal Van Landeghem; Canada	29.01
100 m	Daryna Zevina; Ukraine	1:00.59; CR	Fu Yuanhui; China	1:01.13	Emma Saunders; United Kingdom	1:02.35
200 m	Daryna Zevina; Ukraine	2:10.43; CR	Miyu Otsuka; Japan	2:11.02	Karley Mann; United Kingdom	2:11.40
Girls' breaststroke
50 m	Lisa Fissneider; Italy	31.51	Sarah Haase; United States	31.84	Claire Polit; France	31.95
100 m	Lisa Fissneider; Italy	1:07.71; CR	Kanako Watanabe; Japan	1:08.89	Irina Novikova; Russia	1:09.10
200 m	Kanako Watanabe; Japan	2:25.52	Lisa Fissneider; Italy	2:26.01	Irina Novikova; Russia	2:26.04
Girls' butterfly
50 m	Farida Osman; Egypt	26.69; CR	Kendyl Stewart; United States	26.78	Vanessa Mohr; South Africa; Chantal Van Landeghem; Canada	26.85
100 m	Rachael Kelly; United Kingdom	59.37; CR	Rino Hosoda; Japan	59.39	Alexandra Wenk; Germany	59.64
200 m	Judit Ignacio Sorribes; Spain	2:08.25	Alessia Polieri; Italy	2:09.65	Miyu Otsuka; Japan	2:11.35
Girls' individual medley
200 m	Beatriz Gomez Cortes; Spain	2:13.57	Emu Higuchi; Japan	2:13.96	Erika Seltenreich-Hodgson; Canada	2:15.62
400 m	Miyu Otsuka; Japan	4:40.98; CR	Alessia Polieri; Italy	4:43.41	Claudia Dasca; Spain	4:43.53
Girls' relays
4×100 m freestyle	United States; Kristen Vredeveld (55.64); Simone Manuel (55.90); Rachel Acker (56.48); Lia Neal (54.83)	3:42.85; CR	Canada; Brittany MacLean (55.65); Victoria Chan (57.27); Lauren Earp (55.63); Chantal Van Landeghem (54.69)	3:43.24	Great Britain; Amelia Maughan (57.03); Emma Saunders (55.99); Emily Jones (57.70); Jessica Lloyd (55.27)	3:45.99
4×200 m freestyle	United States; Julia Anderson (2:00.10); Lia Neal (1:59.41); Gillian Ryan (2:00.98); Chelsea Chenault (1:59.84)	8:00.33; CR	Canada; Lauren Earp (2:01.37); Victoria Chan (2:03.07); Tabitha Baumann (2:03.43); Brittany MacLean (1:57.05)	8:04.92	Australia; Bonnie Macdonald (2:00.23); Brianna Throssell (2:02.24); Taylor McKeown (2:03.61); Mikkayla Sheridan (2:00.60)	8:06.68
4×100 m medley	Japan; Yukiko Watanabe (1:02.91); Kanako Watanabe (1:08.32); Rino Hosoda (59.44); Mao Kawakami (54.98)	4:05.65; CR	United States; Kylie Stewart (1:02.46); KC Moss (1:11.73); Kendyl Stewart (58.76); Lia Neal (54.84)	4:07.79	Russia; Julia Larina (1:03.00); Irina Novikova (1:09.10); Daria Tcvetkova (59.86); Veria Kolotushkina (56.03)	4:07.99
