= Swimming at the 2016 Summer Olympics – Women's 200 metre individual medley =

Women's 200 metre individual medley at the Games of the XXXI Olympiad
- Venue: Olympic Aquatics Stadium
- Dates: 8 August 2016 (heats & semifinals); 9 August 2016 (final)
- Competitors: 40 from 27 nations
- Winning time: 2:06.58 OR

Medalists
1st place, gold medalist(s)		Katinka Hosszú; Hungary
2nd place, silver medalist(s)		Siobhan-Marie O'Connor; Great Britain
3rd place, bronze medalist(s)		Maya DiRado; United States

The women's 200 metre individual medley event at the 2016 Summer Olympics took place on 8–9 August at the Olympic Aquatics Stadium.

== Summary ==
Another medley double happened for the sixth straight time, as Hungary's Katinka Hosszú pulled away from the field to collect her third individual Olympic gold at these Games. Leading from the start, she threw down a gold-medal time in 2:06.58 to establish a new Olympic record, and to hold off a charging Great Britain's Siobhan-Marie O'Connor by three tenths of a second. Unable to catch the Hungarian towards a sprint finish, O'Connor produced a new British record of 2:06.88 to take home the silver. Meanwhile, U.S. swimmer Maya DiRado added a bronze to her runner-up prize from the 400 m individual medley three days earlier with a time of 2:08.79, edging out her teammate Melanie Margalis (2:09.21) to fourth by almost half a second.

Australia's Alicia Coutts, silver medalist from London 2012, culminated her Olympic career with a fifth-place time in 2:10.88, and was shortly followed in sixth by Canadian swimmer Sydney Pickrem (2:11.22). Russia's Viktoriya Andreeva (2:12.28), and defending gold medalist Ye Shiwen of China (2:13.56) closed out the field.

Hosszú also posted an Olympic record in 2:07.45 to lead all swimmers on the morning prelims, clipping 0.12 seconds off the previous mark set by Ye Shiwen in London four years earlier.

In the medal ceremony, the medals for the competition were presented by Pál Schmitt, Hungary, IOC member, and the gifts were presented by Mohamed Diop, Senegal, Bureau Member of FINA.

== Records ==
Before this competition, the existing world and Olympic records were as follows.

World record	Katinka Hosszú (HUN)	2:06.12	Kazan, Russia	3 August 2015
Olympic record	Ye Shiwen (CHN)	2:07.57	London, United Kingdom	31 July 2012

The following records were established during the competition:

Date	Round	Name	Nation	Time	Record
8 August	Heat 5	Katinka Hosszú	Hungary	2:07.45	OR
9 August	Final	Katinka Hosszú	Hungary	2:06.58	OR

== Competition format ==
The competition consisted of three rounds: heats, semifinals, and a final. The swimmers with the best 16 times in the heats advanced to the semifinals. The swimmers with the best 8 times in the semifinals advanced to the final. Swim-offs were used as necessary to break ties for advancement to the next round.

== Results ==
=== Heats ===
Rank	Heat	Lane	Name	Nationality	Time	Notes
1	5	4	Katinka Hosszú	Hungary	2:07.45	Q, OR
2	4	4	Siobhan-Marie O'Connor	Great Britain	2:08.44	Q
3	4	3	Melanie Margalis	United States	2:09.62	Q
4	3	4	Maya DiRado	United States	2:10.24	Q
5	4	5	Miho Teramura	Japan	2:10.34	Q
6	3	5	Alicia Coutts	Australia	2:10.52	Q
7	3	6	Ye Shiwen	China	2:10.56	Q
8	5	3	Sydney Pickrem	Canada	2:11.06	Q
9	5	6	Zsuzsanna Jakabos	Hungary	2:11.69	Q
10	2	2	Kim Seo-yeong	South Korea	2:11.75	Q
11	5	7	Runa Imai	Japan	2:11.78	Q
12	3	3	Hannah Miley	Great Britain	2:11.84	Q
13	5	2	Alexandra Wenk	Germany	2:12.46	Q
14	4	1	Erika Seltenreich-Hodgson	Canada	2:12.56	Q
15	4	2	Mireia Belmonte Garcia	Spain	2:12.58	Q
16	5	5	Viktoriya Andreeva	Russia	2:13.01	Q
17	4	6	Kotuku Ngawati	Australia	2:13.05	
18	5	1	Joanna Maranhão	Brazil	2:13.06	
19	2	4	Maria Ugolkova	Switzerland	2:13.77	
20	2	8	Stina Gardell	Sweden	2:14.41	
21	3	2	Barbora Závadová	Czech Republic	2:14.45	
22	2	3	Luisa Trombetti	Italy	2:14:66	
23	4	7	Zhou Min	China	2:14.81	
24	2	7	África Zamorano	Spain	2:14.87	
25	1	2	Tanja Kylliäinen	Finland	2:14.97	
26	4	8	Lisa Zaiser	Austria	2:15.23	
27	1	8	Anja Crevar	Serbia	2:15.33	
28	5	8	Sara Franceschi	Italy	2:15.61	
29	2	5	Louise Hansson	Sweden	2:15.66	
30	1	5	Fantine Lesaffre	France	2:15.71	
30	3	8	Lena Kreundl	Austria	2:15.71	
32	1	4	Nam Yoo-sun	South Korea	2:16.11	
33	3	7	Nguyễn Thị Ánh Viên	Vietnam	2:16.20	
34	1	3	Marrit Steenbergen	Netherlands	2:16.59	
35	1	1	Victoria Kaminskaya	Portugal	2:16.78	
36	1	6	Simona Baumrtová	Czech Republic	2:17.21	
37	2	1	Virginia Bardach	Argentina	2:17.94	
38	3	1	Ranohon Amanova	Uzbekistan	2:18.97	
39	1	7	Katarzyna Baranowska	Poland	2:19.03	
	2	6	Siobhán Haughey	Hong Kong		DNS

=== Semifinals ===
==== Semifinal 1 ====
Rank	Heat	Lane	Name	Nationality	Time	Notes
1	4	4	Siobhan-Marie O'Connor	Great Britain	2:07.57	Q, NR
2	3	5	Maya DiRado	United States	2:08.91	Q
3	3	3	Alicia Coutts	Australia	2:10.35	Q
4	5	6	Sydney Pickrem	Canada	2:10.57	Q
5	5	8	Viktoriya Andreeva	Russia	2:10.87	Q
6	2	2	Kim Seo-yeong	South Korea	2:12.15	
6	3	7	Hannah Miley	Great Britain	2:12.15	
8	4	1	Erika Seltenreich-Hodgson	Canada	2:12.25	

==== Semifinal 2 ====
Rank	Heat	Lane	Name	Nationality	Time	Notes
1	5	4	Katinka Hosszú	Hungary	2:08.13	Q
2	3	6	Ye Shiwen	China	2:09.33	Q
3	4	5	Melanie Margalis	United States	2:10.10	Q
4	4	3	Miho Teramura	Japan	2:11.03	
5	5	2	Zsuzsanna Jakabos	Hungary	2:12.05	
6	5	1	Alexandra Wenk	Germany	2:12.13	
7	2	7	Runa Imai	Japan	2:12.53	
8	4	8	Mireia Belmonte García	Spain	2:13.33	

=== Final ===
Rank	Lane	Name	Nationality	Time	Notes
1st place, gold medalist(s)	5	Katinka Hosszú	Hungary	2:06.58	OR
2nd place, silver medalist(s)	4	Siobhan-Marie O'Connor	Great Britain	2:06.88	NR
3rd place, bronze medalist(s)	3	Maya DiRado	United States	2:08.79	
4	2	Melanie Margalis	United States	2:09.21	
5	7	Alicia Coutts	Australia	2:10.88	
6	1	Sydney Pickrem	Canada	2:11.22	
7	8	Viktoriya Andreeva	Russia	2:12.28	
8	6	Ye Shiwen	China	2:13.56	
