= 2010 Pan Pacific Swimming Championships – Women's 200 metre backstroke =

Women's 200 metre backstroke at the 2010 Pan Pacific Swimming Championships
- Venue: William Woollett Jr. Aquatics Center
- Dates: August 20, 2010 (heats & finals)
- Competitors: 24 from 7 nations
- Winning time: 2:07.83

Medalists
gold medal	Elizabeth Beisel	United States
silver medal	Elizabeth Pelton	United States
bronze medal	Belinda Hocking	Australia

The women's 200 metre backstroke competition at the 2010 Pan Pacific Swimming Championships took place on August 20 at the William Woollett Jr. Aquatics Center. The last champion was Reiko Nakamura of Japan.

This race consisted of four lengths of the pool, all in backstroke.

== Records ==
Prior to this competition, the existing world and Pan Pacific records were as follows:

World record	Kirsty Coventry (ZIM)	2:04.81	Rome, Italy	August 1, 2009
Pan Pacific Championships record	Reiko Nakamura (JPN)	2:08.86	Victoria, Canada	August 19, 2006

== Results ==
All times are in minutes and seconds.

KEY:	q	Fastest non-qualifiers	Q	Qualified	CR	Championships record	NR	National record	PB	Personal best	SB	Seasonal best

=== Heats ===
The first round was held on August 20, at 11:15.

Rank	Heat	Lane	Name	Nationality	Time	Notes
1	4	3	Elizabeth Pelton	United States	2:07.48	QA, CR
2	3	5	Elizabeth Beisel	United States	2:07.90	QA
3	4	5	Emily Seebohm	Australia	2:08.45	QA
4	3	4	Shiho Sakai	Japan	2:08.86	QA
5	4	4	Belinda Hocking	Australia	2:08.96	QA
6	2	3	Missy Franklin	United States	2:09.22	QA
7	2	4	Meagen Nay	Australia	2:09.78	QA
8	2	5	Marie Kamimura	Japan	2:10.28	QA
9	2	7	Genevieve Cantin	Canada	2:10.84	QB
10	4	6	Melissa Ingram	New Zealand	2:11.25	QB
11	2	2	Teresa Crippen	United States	2:11.44	QB
12	4	7	Lauren Lavigna	Canada	2:11.83	QB
13	3	3	Aya Terakawa	Japan	2:12.07	QB
14	3	7	Dominique Bouchard	Canada	2:12.90	QB
15	4	2	Morgan Scroggy	United States	2:13.05	QB
16	3	2	Sinead Russell	Canada	2:13.18	QB
17	3	1	Penny Marshall	New Zealand	2:14.58	
18	2	1	Miyuki Takemura	Japan	2:14.67	
19	1	5	Katy Murdoch	Canada	2:14.88	
20	4	8	Lindsay Seemann	Canada	2:15.35	
21	1	4	Lau Yin-Yan	Hong Kong	2:16.31	
22	3	6	Sophie Edington	Australia	2:17.44	
23	4	1	Fernanda Alvarenga	Brazil	2:20.23	
24	1	3	Larissa Cieslak	Brazil	2:22.68	
-	2	6	Hanae Ito	Japan	DNS	

=== B Final ===
The B final was held on August 20, at 19:09.

Rank	Lane	Name	Nationality	Time	Notes
9	4	Missy Franklin	United States	2:08.05	
10	1	Sinead Russell	Canada	2:11.65	
11	5	Aya Terakawa	Japan	2:11.88	
12	7	Teresa Crippen	United States	2:12.04	
13	3	Dominique Bouchard	Canada	2:12.72	
14	8	Miyuki Takemura	Japan	2:14.36	
15	6	Lau Yin-Yan	Hong Kong	2:18.48	
16	2	Fernanda Alvarenga	Brazil	2:20.67	

=== A Final ===
The A final was held on August 20, at 19:09.

Rank	Lane	Name	Nationality	Time	Notes
1st place, gold medalist(s)	5	Elizabeth Beisel	United States	2:07.83	
2nd place, silver medalist(s)	4	Elizabeth Pelton	United States	2:08.10	
3rd place, bronze medalist(s)	6	Belinda Hocking	Australia	2:08.60	
4	3	Shiho Sakai	Japan	2:09.12	
5	1	Melissa Ingram	New Zealand	2:09.98	
6	7	Genevieve Cantin	Canada	2:11.56	
7	8	Lauren Lavigna	Canada	2:11.89	
8	2	Marie Kamimura	Japan	2:12.21	
