= 2016 FINA World Swimming Championships (25 m) – Women's 200 metre individual medley =

Women's 200 metre individual medley at the 2016 FINA World Swimming Championships (25 m)
- Venue: WFCU Centre
- Dates: 10 December (heats and final)
- Competitors: 46 from 34 nations
- Winning time: 2:02.90

Medalists
gold medal	Katinka Hosszú	Hungary
silver medal	Ella Eastin	United States
bronze medal	Madisyn Cox	United States

The Women's 200 metre individual medley competition of the 2016 FINA World Swimming Championships (25 m) was held on 10 December 2016.

== Records ==
Prior to the competition, the existing world and championship records were as follows.

	Name	Nation	Time	Location	Date
World record Championship record	Katinka Hosszú	Hungary	2:01.86	Doha	6 December 2014

== Results ==
=== Heats ===
The heats were held at 09:44.

Rank	Heat	Lane	Name	Nationality	Time	Notes
1	5	4	Katinka Hosszú	Hungary	2:05.33	Q
2	5	3	Madisyn Cox	United States	2:06.72	Q
3	4	5	Ella Eastin	United States	2:07.65	Q
4	4	4	Miho Teramura	Japan	2:08.14	Q
5	3	5	Yui Ohashi	Japan	2:08.24	Q
6	5	5	Emily Seebohm	Australia	2:08.30	Q
7	3	4	Zsuzsanna Jakabos	Hungary	2:08.46	Q
8	3	2	Sarah Darcel	Canada	2:08.84	Q
9	4	3	Hannah Miley	Great Britain	2:09.22	
10	1	2	Nguyễn Thị Ánh Viên	Vietnam	2:10.69	
11	3	1	Maria Ugolkova	Switzerland	2:11.10	NR
12	3	3	Simona Baumrtová	Czech Republic	2:11.21	
13	4	2	Barbora Závadová	Czech Republic	2:11.29	
14	3	6	Georgia Coates	Great Britain	2:11.76	
15	5	1	Ana Radić	Croatia	2:12.14	
16	5	2	Fantine Lesaffre	France	2:12.46	
17	4	6	Maxine Wolters	Germany	2:12.50	
18	4	8	Marrit Steenbergen	Netherlands	2:12.73	
19	4	7	Lena Kreundl	Austria	2:13.45	
20	3	7	Victoria Kaminskaya	Portugal	2:14.48	
21	4	1	Phiangkhwan Pawapotako	Thailand	2:14.80	
22	1	7	Samantha Yeo	Singapore	2:15.48	
23	5	8	Gabi Grobler	South Africa	2:15.56	
24	4	0	Johanna Gustafsdottir	Iceland	2:15.78	
25	5	0	Rebecca Kamau	Kenya	2:16.64	
26	3	8	Florencia Perotti	Argentina	2:17.70	
27	5	9	Hamida Nefsi	Algeria	2:19.03	
28	4	9	Tang Yuting	China	2:19.47	
29	2	8	Helena Moreno	Costa Rica	2:19.96	
30	3	9	Christie Chue	Singapore	2:20.67	
31	3	0	Sara Nysted	Faroe Islands	2:21.23	
32	2	3	Celina Marquez	El Salvador	2:21.69	NR
33	2	4	Nicole Rautemberg	Paraguay	2:23.02	
34	2	1	Fatima Alkaramova	Azerbaijan	2:23.96	NR
35	2	5	Sofia Lopez	Paraguay	2:24.33	
36	2	2	Lauren Hew	Cayman Islands	2:26.53	
37	2	7	Gabriella Doueihy	Lebanon	2:27.51	NR
38	2	9	Fernanda Archila	Guatemala	2:30.41	
39	2	0	Yara Lima	Angola	2:35.74	NR
40	1	4	Angel de Jesus	Northern Mariana Islands	2:50.87	NR
41	1	5	Aishath Sausan	Maldives	2:57.23	NR
	1	3	Kaya Forson	Ghana		DNS
	1	6	Silja Kansakoski	Finland		DNS
	2	6	Kaylene Corbett	South Africa		DNS
	5	6	Mireia Belmonte	Spain		DNS
	5	7	Jenna Laukkanen	Finland		DNS

=== Final ===
The final was held at 18:37.

Rank	Lane	Name	Nationality	Time	Notes
1st place, gold medalist(s)	4	Katinka Hosszú	Hungary	2:02.90	
2nd place, silver medalist(s)	3	Ella Eastin	United States	2:05.02	
3rd place, bronze medalist(s)	5	Madisyn Cox	United States	2:05.93	
4	7	Emily Seebohm	Australia	2:07.41	
5	6	Miho Teramura	Japan	2:08.47	
6	8	Sarah Darcel	Canada	2:08.59	
7	2	Yui Ohashi	Japan	2:08.89	
8	1	Zsuzsanna Jakabos	Hungary	2:08.95	
