= Swimming at the 2014 Commonwealth Games – Women's 400 metre individual medley =

Women's 400 metre individual medley at the 2014 Commonwealth Games
- Venue: Tollcross International Swimming Centre
- Dates: 24 July 2014
- Competitors: 13 from 7 nations
- Winning time: 4:31.76 GR

Medalists
gold medal	Hannah Miley	Scotland
silver medal	Aimee Willmott	England
bronze medal	Keryn McMaster	Australia

The women's 400 metre individual medley event at the 2014 Commonwealth Games as part of the swimming programme took place on 24 July at the Tollcross International Swimming Centre in Glasgow, Scotland. Defending champion Hannah Miley retained her title, breaking her own Commonwealth Games record twice. Aimee Willmott took second and bronze was won by Australian Keryn McMaster.

The medals were presented by Prince Haji Sufri Bolkiah, President of the Brunei Darussalam National Olympic Council and the quaichs were presented by Michael Cavanagh, Chairman of Commonwealth Games Scotland.

== Records ==
Prior to this competition, the existing world and Commonwealth Games records were as follows.

World record	Ye Shiwen (CHN)	4:28.43	London, England	28 July 2012
Commonwealth record	Stephanie Rice (AUS)	4:29.45	Beijing, China	11 August 2008
Games record	Hannah Miley (SCO)	4:38.83	Delhi, India	9 October 2010

The following records were established during the competition:

Date	Event	Name	Nationality	Time	Record
24 July	Heat	Hannah Miley	Scotland	4:38.27	GR
24 July	Final	Hannah Miley	Scotland	4:31.76	GR

== Results ==
=== Heats ===
Rank	Heat	Lane	Name	Nationality	Time	Notes
1	1	4	Hannah Miley	Scotland	4:38.27	Q, GR
2	2	4	Aimee Willmott	England	4:39.50	Q
3	1	3	Emily Overholt	Canada	4:39.52	Q
4	2	5	Keryn McMaster	Australia	4:40.11	Q
5	1	5	Erika Seltenreich-Hodgson	Canada	4:41.77	Q
6	1	6	Jessica Pengelly	Australia	4:42.89	Q
7	2	6	Danielle Lowe	England	4:48.09	Q
8	2	2	Marni Oldershaw	Canada	4:48.89	Q
9	1	2	Rene Warnes	South Africa	4:49.81	
10	2	3	Ellen Gandy	Australia	4:51.54	
11	2	7	Zara Bailey	Jamaica	4:59.78	
12	1	7	Erika Kong	Malaysia	5:00.72	
13	2	1	Nadia Adrianna Redza Goh	Malaysia	5:07.54	

=== Final ===
Rank	Lane	Name	Nationality	Time	Notes
1st place, gold medalist(s)	4	Hannah Miley	Scotland	4:31.76	GR
2nd place, silver medalist(s)	5	Aimee Willmott	England	4:33.01	
3rd place, bronze medalist(s)	6	Keryn McMaster	Australia	4:36.35	
4	2	Erika Seltenreich-Hodgson	Canada	4:36.88	
5	3	Emily Overholt	Canada	4:37.89	
6	8	Marni Oldershaw	Canada	4:46.26	
7	7	Jessica Pengelly	Australia	4:47.00	
8	1	Danielle Lowe	England	4:48.95	
