= 2012 Junior Pan Pacific Swimming Championships =

- Host city: Honolulu, Hawaii, United States
- Date(s): 23–27 August
- Venue(s): Veterans Memorial Aquatic Center
- Events: 36 total (34 pool, 2 open water)

The 2012 Junior Pan Pacific Swimming Championships were held from 23 to 27 August 2012 at the Veterans Memorial Aquatic Center in Honolulu, Hawaii, United States. Pool swimming competition was conducted in a long course (50 metre) pool and open water swimming was conducted in the Pacific Ocean.

Events were contested in a preliminaries-finals format with a maximum of two athletes per country eligible to compete in each the Championship Final and the Consolation Final.

== Results ==
=== Men ===
Event	Gold		Silver		Bronze	
50 m freestyle	Jack Conger; United States	22.69	Regan Leong; Australia	23.02	Erik Risolvato; United States	23.17
100 m freestyle	Matt Ellis; United States	49.24; CR	Alexander Graham; Australia	49.71	Jack Conger; United States	49.84
200 m freestyle	Andrew Digby; Australia	1:49.11	Daiya Seto; Japan	1:49.95	Pete Brumm; United States	1:50.01
400 m freestyle	Matthew Levings; Australia	3:51.71	Mack Horton; Australia	3:52.26	Evan Pinion; United States	3:52.60
800 m freestyle	Matthew Levings; Australia	7:56.94; CR	William Brothers; Canada	7:59.69	Shogo Takeda; Japan	8:00.43
1500 m freestyle	Mack Horton; Australia	15:10.07; CR	Jordan Harrison; Australia	15:15.76	William Brothers; Canada	15:17.10
100 m backstroke	Jack Conger; United States	54.07; CR	Corey Main; New Zealand	54.96	Takeshi Kawamoto; Japan	55.32
200 m backstroke	Jack Conger; United States	1:57.20; CR	Keita Sunama; Japan	1:59.57	Corey Main; New Zealand	1:59.67
100 m breaststroke	Akihiro Yamaguchi; Japan	59.85; CR	Kazuki Kohinata; Japan	1:02.45	Buster Sykes; Australia	1:03.32
200 m breaststroke	Akihiro Yamaguchi; Japan	2:08.03; CR	Kazuki Kohinata; Japan	2:13.13	Eric Ronda; United States	2:13.89
100 m butterfly	Maclin Davis; United States	52.89	Daiya Seto; Japan	53.23	Matt Ellis; United States	53.59
200 m butterfly	Kenta Hirai; Japan	1:57.40; CR	Corey Okubo; United States	1:58.58	Justin Wright; United States	1:59.58
200 m individual medley	Chase Kalisz; United States	1:59.51; CR	Daiya Seto; Japan	2:00.33	Keita Sunama; Japan	2:00.61
400 m individual medley	Chase Kalisz; United States	4:12.59; CR	Keita Sunama; Japan	4:19.28	Gunnar Bentz; United States	4:20.11
4×100 m freestyle relay	United States; Matt Ellis (49.70); Jack Conger (49.37); Kyle Darmody (49.54); Pete Brumm (50.06)	3:18.67; CR	Australia; Regan Leong (50.24); Alexander Graham (49.66); Hugo Morris (51.18); Andrew Digby (49.74)	3:20.82	Japan; Takeshi Kawamoto (51.03); Kenta Hirai (49.91); Toru Maruyama (49.70); Daiya Seto (50.70)	3:21.34
4×200 m freestyle relay	Japan; Takumi Komatsu (1:49.83); Kenta Hirai (1:48.47); Toru Maruyama (1:50.30); Daiya Seto (1:49.99)	7:18.59	United States; Pete Brumm (1:49.28); Jackson Miller (1:49.80); Chase Kalisz (1:50.42); Gunnar Bentz (1:50.39)	7:19.89	Canada; Stefan Milošević (1:51.19); Aly Abdel Khalik (1:49.45); Robert Gilchrist; Teddy Kalp	7:24.20
4×100 m medley relay	Japan; Takeshi Kawamoto (55.35); Akihiro Yamaguchi (59.55); Daiya Seto (53.21); Kenta Hirai (49.56)	3:37.67; CR	United States; Jack Conger (54.93); Will Licon (1:02.86); Maclin Davis (52.66); Matt Ellis (48.92)	3:39.37	Australia; Regan Leong (58.03); Buster Sykes (1:03.07); David Morgan (53.94); Alexander Graham (48.99)	3:44.03
10 km open water	David Heron; United States	1:42:01.0	Zachary Parkes; Canada	1:42:24.0	Janardan Burns; United States	1:42:57.0

=== Women ===
Event	Gold		Silver		Bronze	
50 m freestyle	Alexandra Purcell; Australia	25.15	Olivia Smoliga; United States	25.39	Ellen O'Rourke; Australia	25.40
100 m freestyle	Simone Manuel; United States	54.80	Ami Matsuo; Australia	55.36	Cierra Runge; United States	55.43
200 m freestyle	Chelsea Chenault; United States	1:58.33	Brianna Throssell; Australia	1:59.44	Leah Smith; United States	1:59.47
400 m freestyle	Leah Smith; United States	4:07.10; CR	Chelsea Chenault; United States	4:09.24	Leah Neale; Australia	4:10.01
800 m freestyle	Leah Smith; United States	8:28.01; CR	Becca Mann; United States	8:28.79	Laura Crockart; Australia	8:36.34
1500 m freestyle	Becca Mann; United States	16:11.98; CR	Danielle Valley; United States	16:26.93	Laura Crockart; Australia	16:30.82
100 m backstroke	Olivia Smoliga; United States	1:01.03	Kylie Stewart; United States	1:01.26	Madison Wilson; Australia	1:01.94
200 m backstroke	Kylie Stewart; United States	2:09.99	Kaitlyn Jones; United States	2:11.08	Kana Ozeki; Japan	2:11.18
100 m breaststroke	Kierra Smith; Canada	1:08.54	Mariya Chekanovych; Canada	1:08.55	Miku Kanasashi; Japan	1:08.63
200 m breaststroke	Kierra Smith; Canada	2:25.78; CR	Mariya Chekanovych; Canada	2:25.96	Annie Zhu; United States	2:26.65
100 m butterfly	Noemie Thomas; Canada	59.02	Brianna Throssell; Australia	59.36	Rino Hosoda; Japan	59.49
200 m butterfly	Misuzu Yabu; Japan	2:10.85	Celina Li; United States	2:11.07	Megan Kingsley; United States	2:11.32
200 m individual medley	Erika Seltenreich-Hodgson; Canada	2:12.93	Chihiro Igarashi; Japan	2:14.04	Celina Li; United States	2:14.16
400 m individual medley	Becca Mann; United States	4:39.76; CR	Keryn McMaster; Australia	4:41.63	Celina Li; United States	4:42.17
4×100 m freestyle relay	United States; Simone Manuel (54.60) CR; Olivia Smoliga (55.86); Cierra Runge (55.04); Chelsea Chenault (55.54)	3:41.04	Australia; Ellen O'Rourke (56.95); Alexandra Purcell (55.05); Brianna Throssell (56.70); Ami Matsuo (54.84)	3:43.54	Canada; Cynthia Pammett (56.67); Victoria Chan (55.60); Erika Seltenreich-Hodgson (55.63); Paige Kremer (56.65)	3:44.55
4×200 m freestyle relay	United States; Simone Manuel (2:00.75); Leah Smith; Cierra Runge; Chelsea Chenault (1:58.49)	7:59.06	Australia; Brianna Throssell; Leah Neale; Mikkayla Sheridan; Ami Matsuo (2:01.18)	8:03.48	Japan; Maho Takiguchi (2:01.16); Megumi Ito (2:02.23); Yasuko Miyamoto; Emu Higuchi	8:04.80
4×100 m medley relay	United States; Olivia Smoliga (1:01.70); Annie Zhu (1:08.44); Katie Kinnear (59.58); Simone Manuel (54.21)	4:03.93	Canada; Sydney Pickrem (1:02.65); Kierra Smith (1:08.62); Noemie Thomas (58.89); Victoria Chan (55.51)	4:05.67	Japan; Maho Tsujimoto (1:03.07); Miku Kanasashi (1:09.76); Rino Hosoda (59.40); Mao Kawakami (54.99)	4:07.22
10 km open water	Becca Mann; United States	1:57:22.0	Emily Seymour; Australia	1:57:40.0	Rachel Zilinskas; United States	1:57:54.0

== Medal table ==
* Host nation (United States)

Rank	Nation	Gold	Silver	Bronze	Total
1	United States*	21	10	16	47
2	Japan	6	8	9	23
3	Australia	5	12	7	24
4	Canada	4	5	3	12
5	New Zealand	0	1	1	2
Totals (5 entries)		36	36	36	108

== Championships records set ==
The following Championships records were set during the course of competition.

Day	Date	Event	Stage	Time	Name	Country
1	23 August	100 m backstroke (men)	Final	54.07	Jack Conger	United States
1	23 August	200 m butterfly (men)	Final	1:57.40	Kenta Hirai	Japan
1	23 August	800 m freestyle (women)	Final	8:28.01	Leah Smith	United States
1	23 August	1500 m freestyle (men)	Final	15:10.07	Mack Horton	Australia
2	24 August	100 m breaststroke (men)	Heats	1:00.64	Akihiro Yamaguchi	Japan
2	24 August	100 m freestyle (men)	Final	49.24	Matt Ellis	United States
2	24 August	100 m breaststroke (men)	Final	59.85	Akihiro Yamaguchi	Japan
2	24 August	400 m individual medley (women)	Final	4:39.76	Becca Mann	United States
2	24 August	400 m individual medley (men)	Final	4:12.59	Chase Kalisz	United States
3	25 August	400 m freestyle (women)	Heats	4:08.08	Leah Smith	United States
3	25 August	100 m butterfly (women)	Heats	58.68	Noemie Thomas	Canada
3	25 August	400 m freestyle (women)	Final	4:07.10	Leah Smith	United States
3	25 August	200 m backstroke (men)	Final	1:57.20	Jack Conger	United States
3	25 August	100 m freestyle (women) in 4×100 m freestyle relay (women)	Final	54.60	Simone Manuel	United States
3	25 August	4×100 m freestyle relay (men)	Final	3:18.67	Matt Ellis (49.70); Jack Conger (49.37); Kyle Darmody (49.54); Pete Brumm (50.06)	United States
4	26 August	200 m breaststroke (men)	Heats	2:10.44	Akihiro Yamaguchi	Japan
4	26 August	200 m individual medley (men)	Final	1:59.51	Chase Kalisz	United States
4	26 August	200 m breaststroke (women)	Final	2:25.78	Kierra Smith	Canada
4	26 August	200 m breaststroke (men)	Final	2:08.03	Akihiro Yamaguchi	Japan
4	26 August	1500 m freestyle (women)	Final	16:11.98	Becca Mann	United States
4	26 August	800 m freestyle (men)	Final	7:56.94	Matthew Levings	Australia
4	26 August	4×100 m medley relay (men)	Final	3:37.67	Takeshi Kawamoto (55.35); Akihiro Yamaguchi (59.55); Daiya Seto (53.21); Kenta Hirai (49.56)	Japan
