= Hungary at the 2013 World Aquatics Championships =

- Flag of Hungary
- World Aquatics code: HUN
- National federation: Magyar Úszó Szövetség
- Website: www.musz.hu

in Barcelona, Spain
- Competitors: 47 in 4 sports
- Medals Ranked 5th: Gold 4 Silver 1 Bronze 2 Total 7

World Aquatics Championships appearances (overview)
- 1973; 1975; 1978; 1982; 1986; 1991; 1994; 1998; 2001; 2003; 2005; 2007; 2009; 2011; 2013; 2015; 2017; 2019; 2022; 2023; 2024; 2025

Hungary competed at the 2013 World Aquatics Championships in Barcelona, Spain between 19 July to 4 August 2013.

== Medalists ==
Medal	Name	Sport	Event	Date
Gold	Katinka Hosszú	Swimming	Women's 200 m individual medley	29 July
Gold	Dániel Gyurta	Swimming	Men's 200 m breaststroke	2 August
Gold	Hungary men's national water polo team: Attila Decker; Viktor Nagy; Bence Bátori; Krisztián Bedő; Ádám Decker; Miklós Gór-Nagy; Balázs Hárai; Norbert Hosnyánszky; Norbert Madaras; Márton Szivós; Dániel Varga; Dénes Varga; Márton Vámos	Water polo	Men's tournament	3 August
Gold	Katinka Hosszú	Swimming	Women's 400 m individual medley	4 August
Silver	László Cseh	Swimming	Men's 100 m butterfly	3 August
Bronze	Katinka Hosszú	Swimming	Women's 200 m butterfly	1 August
Bronze	Hungary women's national water polo team: Flóra Bolonyai; Orsolya Kasó; Dóra Antal; Barbara Bujka; Krisztina Garda; Anna Illés; Rita Keszthelyi; Dóra Kisteleki; Katalin Menczinger; Ibolya Kitti Miskolczi; Gabriella Szűcs; Orsolya Takács; Ildikó Tóth	Water polo	Women's tournament	2 August

== Diving ==
Men

Athlete	Event	Preliminaries		Semifinals		Final	
Athlete	Event	Points	Rank	Points	Rank	Points	Rank
Botond Bóta	1 m springboard	272.70	37	—		did not advance	

Women

Athlete	Event	Preliminaries		Semifinals		Final	
Athlete	Event	Points	Rank	Points	Rank	Points	Rank
Flóra Gondos	3 m springboard	200.20	37	did not advance			
Villő Kormos	10 m platform	278.05	20	did not advance			
Zsófia Reisinger	10 m platform	250.45	25	did not advance			
Flóra Gondos; Zsófia Reisinger	3 m synchronized springboard	241.89	15	—		did not advance	
Villő Kormos; Zsófia Reisinger	10 m synchronized platform	256.26	12 Q	—		261.24	10

== Open water swimming ==
Athlete	Event	Time	Rank
Gergely Gyurta	Men's 10 km	1:49:34.6	18
Gergely Gyurta	Men's 25 km	4:49:03.9	13
Márk Papp	Men's 5 km	53:55.3	28
Anna Olasz	Women's 5 km	56:58.4	12
Anna Olasz	Women's 10 km	1:58:22.4	5
Éva Risztov	Women's 10 km	1:58:23.4	9
Márk Papp; Anna Olasz; Éva Risztov	Mixed team	56:09.4	9

== Swimming ==
Hungarian swimmers earned qualifying standards in the following events (up to a maximum of 2 swimmers in each event at the A-standard entry time, and 1 at the B-standard):

Men

Athlete	Event	Heat		Semifinal		Final	
Athlete	Event	Time	Rank	Time	Rank	Time	Rank
Gábor Balog	200 m backstroke	1:57.98	10 Q	1:57.42	9	did not advance	
Péter Bernek	50 m backstroke	26.36	28	did not advance			
Péter Bernek	200 m backstroke	1:57.20	4 Q	1:57.37	8 Q	1:58.26	8
Bence Biczó	200 m butterfly	1:56.70	9 Q	1:56.48	13	did not advance	
László Cseh	100 m backstroke	54.06	8 Q	54.00	13	did not advance	
László Cseh	100 m butterfly	51.89	3 Q	51.61 NR	5 Q	51.45 NR	2nd place, silver medalist(s)
László Cseh	200 m individual medley	1:57.70	1 Q	1:57.41	3 Q	1:57.70	5
Dániel Gyurta	200 m breaststroke	2:09.94	3 Q	2:08.50	1 Q	2:07.23 EU	1st place, gold medalist(s)
Gergely Gyurta	1500 m freestyle	15:09.21	=12	—		did not advance	
Gergő Kis	400 m freestyle	3:50.87	16	—		did not advance	
Gergő Kis	800 m freestyle	8:00.92	22	—		did not advance	
Gergő Kis	1500 m freestyle	15:23.26	21	—		did not advance	
Bence Pulai	50 m butterfly	24.31	34	did not advance			
Bence Pulai	100 m butterfly	52.98	24	did not advance			
Krisztián Takács	50 m freestyle	22.01	=8 Q	22.28	16	did not advance	
Krisztián Takács	100 m freestyle	49.70	24	did not advance			
Dávid Verrasztó	400 m individual medley	4:13.95	5 Q	—		4:13.68	6
László Cseh; Dániel Gyurta; Bence Pulai; Krisztián Takács	4 × 100 m medley relay	3:34.64	7 Q	—		3:34.09	7

Women

Athlete	Event	Heat		Semifinal		Final	
Athlete	Event	Time	Rank	Time	Rank	Time	Rank
Katinka Hosszú	200 m freestyle	1:56.73	2 Q	1:56.80	9	did not advance	
Katinka Hosszú	100 m backstroke	59.40 NR	2 Q	Withdrew			
Katinka Hosszú	200 m backstroke	2:08.93	5 Q	2:08.97	6 Q	2:09.08	6
Katinka Hosszú	200 m butterfly	2:07.51	2 Q	2:06.85	3 Q	2:05.59	3rd place, bronze medalist(s)
Katinka Hosszú	200 m individual medley	2:08.45	1 Q	2:08.59	1 Q	2:07.92	1st place, gold medalist(s)
Katinka Hosszú	400 m individual medley	4:32.72	1 Q	—		4:30.41	1st place, gold medalist(s)
Zsuzsanna Jakabos	200 m butterfly	2:07.87	7 Q	2:07.31	6 Q	2:06.58	5
Zsuzsanna Jakabos	200 m individual medley	2:12.31	=10 Q	2:11.21	8 Q	2:10.95	6
Zsuzsanna Jakabos	400 m individual medley	4:34.93	=3 Q	—		4:34.50	6
Boglárka Kapás	400 m freestyle	4:05.61 NR	7 Q	—		4:05.90	5
Boglárka Kapás	800 m freestyle	8:25.26	5 Q	—		8:21.21	4
Boglárka Kapás	1500 m freestyle	16:02.58 NR	5 Q	—		16:06.89	7
Evelyn Verrasztó	100 m freestyle	55.08	17 Q	55.32	15	did not advance	
Evelyn Verrasztó	200 m backstroke	2:10.86	12 Q	2:11.83	16	did not advance	
Evelyn Verrasztó	100 m butterfly	58.95	14 Q	58.74	12	did not advance	

== Water polo ==
=== Men's tournament ===
Team roster

Hungary men's water polo team squad:

- Attila Decker
- Viktor Nagy
- Bence Bátori
- Krisztián Bedő
- Ádám Decker
- Miklós Gór-Nagy
- Balázs Hárai
- Norbert Hosnyánszky
- Norbert Madaras
- Márton Szivós
- Dániel Varga
- Dénes Varga
- Márton Vámos
- Coach: Tibor Benedek

Group play

	Pld	W	D	L	GF	GA	GD	Pts
Serbia	3	3	0	0	39	26	+13	6
Hungary	3	1	1	1	32	27	+5	3
Australia	3	1	1	1	25	26	−1	3
China	3	0	0	3	21	38	−17	0

22 July 2013; 17:30	Report	Hungary	13–5	China	Piscines Bernat Picornell, Barcelona; Attendance: 500; Referees: Margeta (SLO), Mellirar (RSA)
22 July 2013; 17:30	Report	Score by quarters: 3–1, 4–1, 3–2, 3–1			Piscines Bernat Picornell, Barcelona; Attendance: 500; Referees: Margeta (SLO), Mellirar (RSA)
22 July 2013; 17:30	Report	Szivós 5	Goals	five players 1	Piscines Bernat Picornell, Barcelona; Attendance: 500; Referees: Margeta (SLO), Mellirar (RSA)

24 July 2013; 13:30	Report	Serbia	13–10	Hungary	Piscines Bernat Picornell, Barcelona; Attendance: 1,000; Referees: Margeta (SLO), Koryzna (POL)
24 July 2013; 13:30	Report	Score by quarters: 2–3, 5–2, 2–2, 4–3			Piscines Bernat Picornell, Barcelona; Attendance: 1,000; Referees: Margeta (SLO), Koryzna (POL)
24 July 2013; 13:30	Report	Prlainović, Nikić 3	Goals	Dé. Varga 3	Piscines Bernat Picornell, Barcelona; Attendance: 1,000; Referees: Margeta (SLO), Koryzna (POL)

26 July 2013; 10:50	Report	Hungary	9–9	Australia	Piscines Bernat Picornell, Barcelona; Attendance: 1,100; Referees: Margeta (SLO), Stavridis (GRE)
26 July 2013; 10:50	Report	Score by quarters: 3–3, 1–1, 3–3, 2–2			Piscines Bernat Picornell, Barcelona; Attendance: 1,100; Referees: Margeta (SLO), Stavridis (GRE)
26 July 2013; 10:50	Report	Vámos 3	Goals	Campbell 5	Piscines Bernat Picornell, Barcelona; Attendance: 1,100; Referees: Margeta (SLO), Stavridis (GRE)

Round of 16

28 July 2013; 18:50	Report	Hungary	16–7	Kazakhstan	Piscines Bernat Picornell, Barcelona; Attendance: 700; Referees: Reemnet (NED), Koryzna (POL)
28 July 2013; 18:50	Report	Score by quarters: 2–4, 7–1, 6–1, 1–1			Piscines Bernat Picornell, Barcelona; Attendance: 700; Referees: Reemnet (NED), Koryzna (POL)
28 July 2013; 18:50	Report	five players 2	Goals	Gubarev 3	Piscines Bernat Picornell, Barcelona; Attendance: 700; Referees: Reemnet (NED), Koryzna (POL)

Quarterfinal

30 July 2013; 15:30	Report	Greece	3–9	Hungary	Piscines Bernat Picornell, Barcelona; Attendance: 900; Referees: Golijanin (SRB), Bender (GER)
30 July 2013; 15:30	Report	Score by quarters: 1–2, 1–1, 1–2, 0–4			Piscines Bernat Picornell, Barcelona; Attendance: 900; Referees: Golijanin (SRB), Bender (GER)
30 July 2013; 15:30	Report	three players 1	Goals	three players 2	Piscines Bernat Picornell, Barcelona; Attendance: 900; Referees: Golijanin (SRB), Bender (GER)

Semifinal

1 August 2013; 20:15	Report	Hungary	11–10	Croatia	Piscines Bernat Picornell, Barcelona; Attendance: 4,000; Referees: Flahive (AUS), Naumov (RUS)
1 August 2013; 20:15	Report	Score by quarters: 2–3, 4–2, 3–2, 2–3			Piscines Bernat Picornell, Barcelona; Attendance: 4,000; Referees: Flahive (AUS), Naumov (RUS)
1 August 2013; 20:15	Report	Vámos, Szivós 3	Goals	four players 2	Piscines Bernat Picornell, Barcelona; Attendance: 4,000; Referees: Flahive (AUS), Naumov (RUS)

Final

3 August 2013; 22:15	Report	Hungary	8–7	Montenegro	Piscines Bernat Picornell, Barcelona; Attendance: 4,500; Referees: Borrell (ESP), Margeta (SLO)
3 August 2013; 22:15	Report	Score by quarters: 2–0, 1–2, 3–3, 2–2			Piscines Bernat Picornell, Barcelona; Attendance: 4,500; Referees: Borrell (ESP), Margeta (SLO)
3 August 2013; 22:15	Report	Szivós, Hárai 2	Goals	Ivović 3	Piscines Bernat Picornell, Barcelona; Attendance: 4,500; Referees: Borrell (ESP), Margeta (SLO)

=== Women's tournament ===
Team roster

Hungary women's water polo team:

- Flóra Bolonyai
- Orsolya Kasó
- Dóra Antal
- Barbara Bujka
- Krisztina Garda
- Anna Illés
- Rita Keszthelyi
- Dóra Kisteleki
- Katalin Menczinger
- Ibolya Kitti Miskolczi
- Gabriella Szűcs
- Orsolya Takács
- Ildikó Tóth

Coach: András Merész

Group play

	Pld	W	D	L	GF	GA	GD	Pts
Hungary	3	3	0	0	48	17	+31	6
Italy	3	2	0	1	26	22	+4	4
Kazakhstan	3	1	0	2	23	32	−9	2
Brazil	3	0	0	3	16	42	−26	0

21 July 2013; 18:50	Report	Hungary	20–6	Brazil	Piscines Bernat Picornell, Barcelona; Attendance: 300; Referees: Naumov (RUS), Reemnet (NED)
21 July 2013; 18:50	Report	Score by quarters: 6–2, 3–0, 3–0, 8–4			Piscines Bernat Picornell, Barcelona; Attendance: 300; Referees: Naumov (RUS), Reemnet (NED)
21 July 2013; 18:50	Report	Keszthelyi 5	Goals	Zablith, Chiappini 2	Piscines Bernat Picornell, Barcelona; Attendance: 300; Referees: Naumov (RUS), Reemnet (NED)

23 July 2013; 18:50	Report	Hungary	10–4	Italy	Piscines Bernat Picornell, Barcelona; Attendance: 400; Referees: Borrell (ESP), Margeta (SLO)
23 July 2013; 18:50	Report	Score by quarters: 3–1, 3–1, 3–1, 1–1			Piscines Bernat Picornell, Barcelona; Attendance: 400; Referees: Borrell (ESP), Margeta (SLO)
23 July 2013; 18:50	Report	Keszthelyi, Bujka 4	Goals	four players 1	Piscines Bernat Picornell, Barcelona; Attendance: 400; Referees: Borrell (ESP), Margeta (SLO)

25 July 2013; 12:10	Report	Hungary	18–7	Kazakhstan	Piscines Bernat Picornell, Barcelona; Attendance: 200; Referees: Williams (NZL), Bender (GER)
25 July 2013; 12:10	Report	Score by quarters: 8–1, 4–2, 3–2, 3–2			Piscines Bernat Picornell, Barcelona; Attendance: 200; Referees: Williams (NZL), Bender (GER)
25 July 2013; 12:10	Report	Bujka 3	Goals	Jakayeva 4	Piscines Bernat Picornell, Barcelona; Attendance: 200; Referees: Williams (NZL), Bender (GER)

Round of 16

27 July 2013; 20:10	Report	Hungary	14–5	Great Britain	Piscines Bernat Picornell, Barcelona; Attendance: 450; Referees: Terepenka (CAN), Drury (USA)
27 July 2013; 20:10	Report	Score by quarters: 4–2, 4–2, 2–0, 4–1			Piscines Bernat Picornell, Barcelona; Attendance: 450; Referees: Terepenka (CAN), Drury (USA)
27 July 2013; 20:10	Report	Bujka 5	Goals	Nixon 2	Piscines Bernat Picornell, Barcelona; Attendance: 450; Referees: Terepenka (CAN), Drury (USA)

Quarterfinal

29 July 2013; 20:15	Report	Netherlands	7–11	Hungary	Piscines Bernat Picornell, Barcelona; Attendance: 1,800; Referees: Moller (ARG), Taylan (TUR)
29 July 2013; 20:15	Report	Score by quarters: 1–5, 0–2, 3–2, 3–2			Piscines Bernat Picornell, Barcelona; Attendance: 1,800; Referees: Moller (ARG), Taylan (TUR)
29 July 2013; 20:15	Report	Klaassen 2	Goals	Keszthelyi 4	Piscines Bernat Picornell, Barcelona; Attendance: 1,800; Referees: Moller (ARG), Taylan (TUR)

Semifinal

31 July 2013; 21:45	Report	Spain	13–12	Hungary	Piscines Bernat Picornell, Barcelona; Attendance: 3,200; Referees: Drury (USA), Alexandrescu (ROU)
31 July 2013; 21:45	Report	Score by quarters: 5–5, 4–4, 2–3, 2–0			Piscines Bernat Picornell, Barcelona; Attendance: 3,200; Referees: Drury (USA), Alexandrescu (ROU)
31 July 2013; 21:45	Report	Espar 4	Goals	Antal 4	Piscines Bernat Picornell, Barcelona; Attendance: 3,200; Referees: Drury (USA), Alexandrescu (ROU)

Third place game

2 August 2013; 16:30	Report	Russia	8–10	Hungary	Piscines Bernat Picornell, Barcelona; Attendance: 1,250; Referees: Drury (USA), Bianchi (ITA)
2 August 2013; 16:30	Report	Score by quarters: 3–3, 2–2, 2–3, 1–2			Piscines Bernat Picornell, Barcelona; Attendance: 1,250; Referees: Drury (USA), Bianchi (ITA)
2 August 2013; 16:30	Report	A. Antonova 3	Goals	Keszthelyi, Tóth 3	Piscines Bernat Picornell, Barcelona; Attendance: 1,250; Referees: Drury (USA), Bianchi (ITA)

== Sources ==
- "Úszás: tizenhat fős válogatott utazik a barcelonai vb-re" (in Hungarian). nemzetisport.hu. 29 June 2013.
- "Négy magyar műugró indul a barcelonai vb-n". atv.hu. 3 July 2013.
