= Akihiro Yamaguchi =

Japanese swimmer (born 1994)

Personal information
- Full name: Akihiro Yamaguchi
- Nationality: Japan
- Born: September 11, 1994 (age 31) Kagoshima Prefecture
- Height: 1.75 m (5 ft 9 in)
- Weight: 67 kg (148 lb)

Sport
- Sport: Swimming
- Strokes: Breaststroke
- Club: DC Shibushi
Medal record
Men's swimming
Representing Japan
World Junior Championships
Gold medal – first place	2011 Lima	200 m breaststroke
Silver medal – second place	2011 Lima	50 m breaststroke
Silver medal – second place	2011 Lima	100 m breaststroke
Silver medal – second place	2011 Lima	4×100 m medley
Junior Pan Pacific Championships
Gold medal – first place	2012 Honolulu	100 m breaststroke
Gold medal – first place	2012 Honolulu	200 m breaststroke
Gold medal – first place	2012 Honolulu	4×100 m medley

Akihiro Yamaguchi (山口 観弘, Yamaguchi Akihiro; born September 11, 1994) is a retired Japanese swimmer and former world record holder who specializes in the breaststroke.

At the 2011 World Junior Swimming Championships in Lima, Yamaguchi won a total of four medals: one gold and three silvers. His gold came in the 200-meter breaststroke with a time of 2:11.70.

On September 15, 2012, at the National Sports Festival of Japan, he set a new world record in the 200-meter breaststroke (long course) with a time of 2:07.01, bettering the previous record of 2:07.28.

== Personal bests ==
Long course
Event	Time	Meet	Date	Note(s)
50 m breaststroke	27.69	JOC Junior Olympic Cup (2012 Summer)	August 30, 2012	
100 m breaststroke	59.56	Japan Inter-High School Championships	August 20, 2012	
200 m breaststroke	2:07.01	National Sports Festival of Japan	September 15, 2012	

Records
Preceded by (Hungary) Dániel Gyurta	Men's 200 metre breaststroke world record holder (long course); September 15, 2012 – January 29, 2017	Succeeded by (Japan) Ippei Watanabe
