= Maya DiRado =

American swimmer (born 1993)

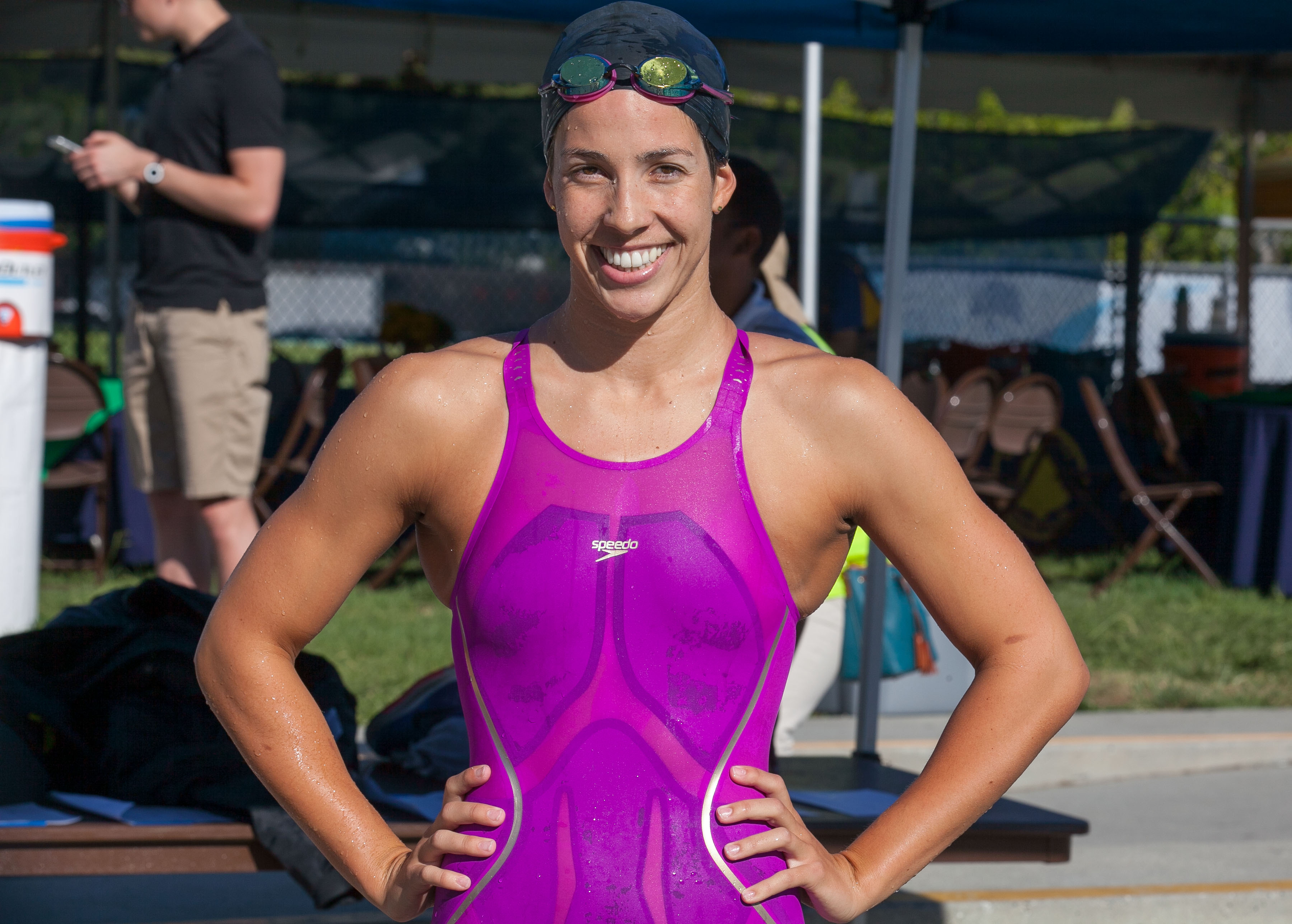
- DiRado in Santa Clara, California in 2016

Personal information
- Full name: Madeline Jane DiRado Andrews
- Nickname: Maya
- National team: United States
- Born: April 5, 1993 (age 33) Santa Rosa, California, U.S.
- Height: 5 ft 9 in (175 cm)
- Weight: 143 lb (65 kg)

Sport
- Sport: Swimming
- Strokes: Freestyle, butterfly, backstroke, medley
- Club: Santa Rosa Neptunes
- College team: Stanford University
- Coach: Greg Meehan
Medal record
Women's swimming
Representing the United States
Olympic Games
Gold medal – first place	2016 Rio de Janeiro	200 m backstroke
Gold medal – first place	2016 Rio de Janeiro	4×200 m freestyle
Silver medal – second place	2016 Rio de Janeiro	400 m medley
Bronze medal – third place	2016 Rio de Janeiro	200 m medley
World Championships (LC)
Gold medal – first place	2013 Barcelona	4×200 m freestyle
Silver medal – second place	2015 Kazan	400 m medley
Pan Pacific Championships
Gold medal – first place	2014 Gold Coast	200 m medley
Silver medal – second place	2014 Gold Coast	400 m medley

Madeline Jane "Maya" DiRado-Andrews (born April 5, 1993) is a retired American competitive swimmer who specialized in freestyle, butterfly, backstroke, and individual medley events. She attended and swam for Stanford University, where she won NCAA titles in the 200 and 400 meter individual medley in 2014 and graduated with a degree in management science and engineering. At the 2016 US Olympic Trials, DiRado qualified to swim the 200 meter and 400 meter individual medley events, as well as the 200 meter backstroke, at the 2016 Summer Olympics. At the 2016 Summer Olympics in Rio de Janeiro, she won a gold medal in the women's 4x200 meter freestyle relay, a silver medal in the 400 meter individual medley, a bronze medal in the women's 200 meter individual medley, and a gold medal in the 200 meter backstroke. Following the Olympics, DiRado retired from the sport.

== Early years ==
DiRado is the second daughter of Stanford alumni Marit (née Parker) and Ruben DiRado. Her mother, of Norwegian descent, works as an oncology nurse. Her father, of Italian heritage, was born in Argentina after his grandparents emigrated there from Italy following World War II. He moved to the United States at the age of three. Marit and Ruben met through a Christian fellowship group at Stanford. Maya received her short name from her older sister, Sarah, who had difficulty pronouncing “Madeline.”

DiRado began swimming at the age of six, when she joined the Santa Rosa Neptunes with her Olympic Teammate Molly Hannis. At the age of 17, DiRado graduated from Maria Carrillo High School in Santa Rosa, where she was a three-time high school state champion in the 200 yard IM. In her senior year in 2010, she set the California state record with a time of 1:56.17 in the 200 yard I.M. She also won the 100 yard freestyle with a time of 49.83.

== College career ==
As part of a long line of Stanford graduates, DiRado followed in her family's footsteps and attended Stanford University. In her freshman year, she finished second in the 200 yard IM (individual medley) with a time of 1:54.66 and third in the 400 yard IM (4:01.02) at the Division 1 NCAA Championships. The following year, she finished third and fourth in the 200 yard and 400 yard IM events, as well as second in the 200 yard backstroke to future Olympic teammate Elizabeth Beisel, with a time of 1:51.42. She set the age group record for female swimmers age 17–18 as she became the fifth woman ever to swim under four minutes in the 400 IM (3:59.88). In the 2013 NCAA Division 1 Championships, DiRado touched third and second in the 200 and 400 yard IM and fifth in 200 yard backstroke. She concluded her Stanford career with her first individual titles in both the 200 and 400 yard IM, and added a second-place finish in the 200 yard butterfly. For her performance in her senior year, she was named Pac-12 Swimmer of the Year.

Career list of All-American Titles: 200 back: 2011 (5th), 2012 (2nd); 200 IM: 2011 (2nd), 2012 (3rd); 400 IM: 2011 (3rd), 2012 (4th); 400 Free Relay: 2011 (5th); 800 Free Relay: 2011 (9th), 2012 (7th).

== Swimming career ==
=== 2012 Olympic Trials ===
At the 2012 United States Olympic Trials, the U.S. qualifying meet for the Olympics, DiRado swam the 200 meter IM, 400 meter IM, and 200 meter back. She finished 4th in both IM events, which did not qualify her for the Olympics since only the top two finishers of each event qualified.

=== 2013 World Championships ===
DiRado qualified for the 2013 World Aquatics Championships held in Barcelona in three events: 400 meter IM, 200 meter butterfly, and the 4x200 meter freestyle relay. She earned her spot by winning the 400 meter IM, gaining silver in the 200 meter butterfly, and touching fifth in the 200 meter freestyle at the 2013 Phillips 66 National Championships.

She swam the preliminary heat of the 4x200 meter freestyle relay with Chelsea Chenault, Karlee Bispo, and Jordan Mattern. The finals team of Katie Ledecky, Shannon Vreeland, Karlee Bispo, and Missy Franklin won the 4x200 meter freestyle relay in the evening, so DiRado was awarded a gold medal for her prelim contributions. She also finished fourth in the 400 meter IM and twelfth in the 200 meter fly.

=== 2014 Pan Pacific Swimming Championships ===
DiRado won two medals at the Pan Pacific Swimming Championships in 2014 – a gold in the 200 meter IM and a silver in the 400 meter IM. In the 200 meter IM, she beat Australian swimmer Alicia Coutts 2:09.93 to 2:10.25 for gold, which tied the meet record Emily Seebohm set in 2010. She finished second in the 400 meter IM in 4:35.37, compared to 4:31.99 swam by her teammate and winner Elizabeth Beisel. DiRado also finished ninth in the 200 meter butterfly.

=== 2015 World Championships ===
DiRado swam two events at the 2015 World Championships, the two individual medleys. In her first event, the 200 meter IM, DiRado just finished outside of a medal, touching fourth with a time of 2:08.99. However, she won her first individual World Championship medal in the 400 meter IM, in which she finished second in 4:31.71 behind Katinka Hosszú.

=== 2016 Summer Olympics ===
At the 2016 United States Olympic Trials, the U.S. qualifying meet for the Rio Olympics, DiRado qualified for the U.S. Olympic team for the first time by winning the 200-meter individual medley, 400-meter individual medley, and 200-meter backstroke.

At the 2016 Olympic Games in Rio de Janeiro, Brazil, DiRado won four medals – two gold, one silver, and one bronze. On the first night of competition, DiRado touched second in the 400-meter individual medley in 4:31.15 behind Katinka Hosszú, who broke the world record. She also won a bronze medal in the 200-meter individual medley in a personal best time of 2:08.79, behind Hosszú and Siobhan-Marie O'Connor who won gold and silver respectively. Even though she did not swim the 200-meter freestyle at Trials, DiRado was placed in the finals relay lineup for the 4×200-meter freestyle relay by the coaches. Along with Allison Schmitt, Leah Smith, and Katie Ledecky, DiRado won her first gold medal of the Olympics. In her final event, the 200-meter backstroke, DiRado again faced Hosszú, who was favored to win the event. Hosszú led for the entire race until DiRado surged in the last 25 meters and out touched Hosszú by 6 one-hundredths, 2:05.99 to 2:06.05, for the win.

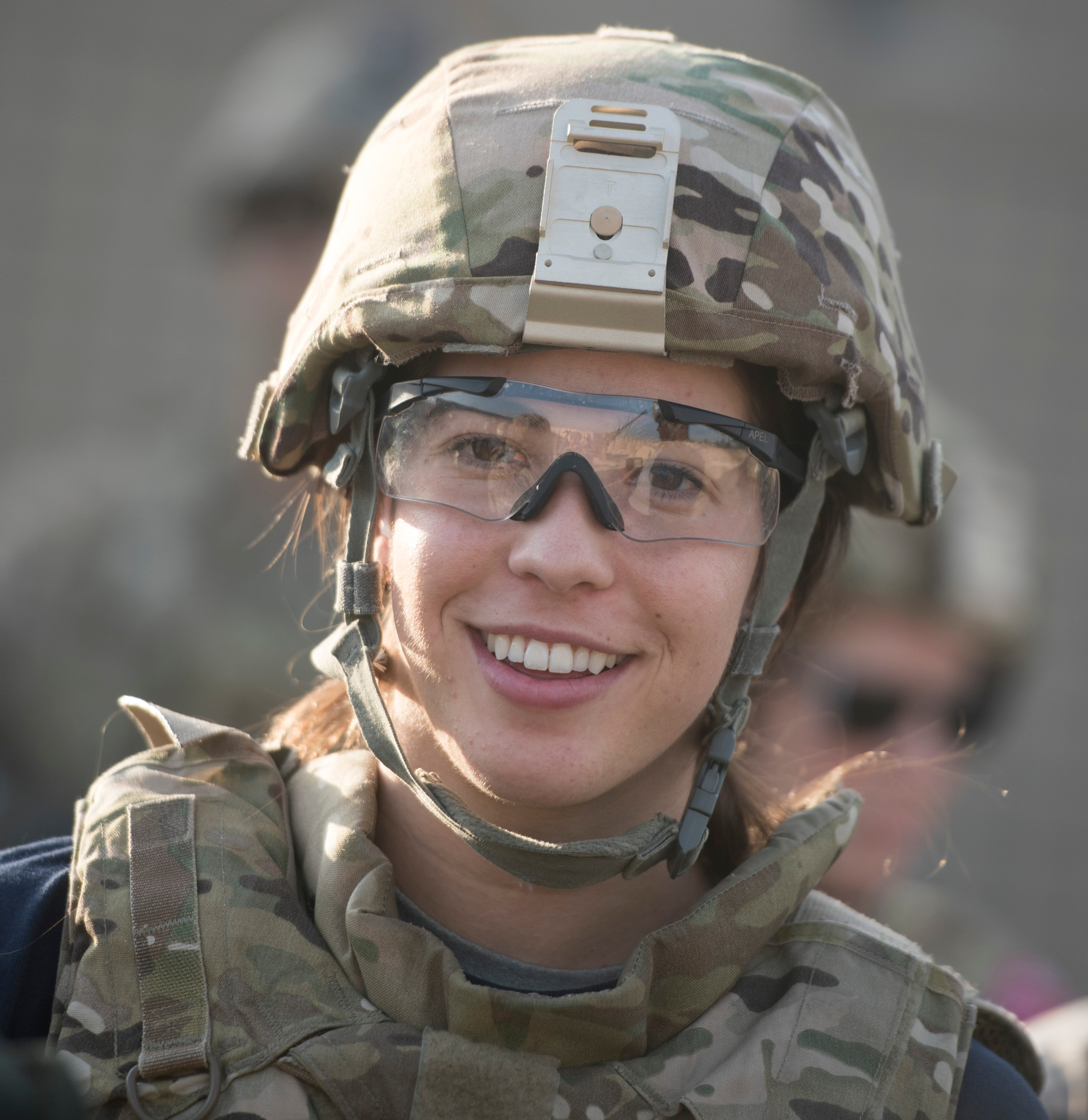
DiRado visiting a U.S. military base in Afghanistan in December 2016

=== 2016–2021: Retirement and redirection ===
DiRado retired from the competitive swimming side of the sport following her performances in August 2016 at her Olympic debut in the 2016 Summer Olympics. She decided to stay active in the swimming community after her retirement by serving as a board member for the United States Swimming Foundation and USA Swimming.

In 2020, DiRado spoke to the leadership council at the University of Minnesota about what it means to be a good team player and leader in swimming through actions such as honoring one's values. She was still retired from competitive swimming as of August 2021.

== Personal life ==
DiRado earned a Bachelor of Science in Management Science and Engineering from Stanford in 2010. She later returned to Stanford to pursue an MBA, which she completed in 2022. DiRado married former Stanford swimmer Rob Andrews on September 19, 2015 at First Presbyterian Church in Santa Rosa, California. The two met while they were both on the Stanford swim team. In August 2021, DiRado announced she and her husband were pregnant and expecting a boy. An article on the announcement published by SwimSwam was the 19th most read article out of all articles published on SwimSwam for the 2021 year. In January 2022, DiRado announced the birth of her and her husband's son, whom they named Charlie Alan Andrews. In April 2024, DiRado announced the birth of her second child Eleanor.

In March 2017, she joined the management consulting firm McKinsey & Company as a Business Analyst. While at McKinsey & Company, DiRado supported strategic health care provider procurement improvements and implemented risk identification programs in the banking industry. As of October 2025, she was part of the Investor Relations team at the global venture capital firm General Catalyst in San Francisco.

In addition to her parents, DiRado has several other family members who are Stanford alumni, including her maternal grandfather, maternal great-aunt, aunt, sister, brother-in-law, and husband.

== Personal best times ==
Event	Time	Location	Date	Notes
200 m IM	2:08.79	Rio de Janeiro	August 9, 2016	
400 m IM	4:31.15	Rio de Janeiro	August 6, 2016	
200 m butterfly	2:07.42	Gold Coast	August 21, 2014	
100 m backstroke	1:00.36	Santa Clara	June 4, 2016	
200 m backstroke	2:05.99	Rio de Janeiro	August 12, 2016	

== See also ==
- List of World Aquatics Championships medalists in swimming (women)
