= Swimming at the 2013 World Aquatics Championships – Women's 200 metre butterfly =

Women's 200 metre butterfly at the 2013 World Aquatics Championships
- Venue: Palau Sant Jordi
- Date: July 31, 2013 (heats & semifinals); August 1, 2013 (final)
- Competitors: 26 from 21 nations
- Winning time: 2:04.59

Medalists
gold medal	Liu Zige	China
silver medal	Mireia Belmonte	Spain
bronze medal	Katinka Hosszú	Hungary

Barcelona Palau San Jordi

The women's 200 metre butterfly event in swimming at the 2013 World Aquatics Championships took place on 31 July and 1 August at the Palau Sant Jordi in Barcelona, Spain.

== Records ==
Prior to this competition, the existing world and championship records were:

World record	Liu Zige (CHN)	2:01.81	Jinan, China	21 October 2009
Competition record	Jessicah Schipper (AUS)	2:03.41	Rome, Italy	31 July 2009

== Results ==
=== Heats ===
The heats were held at 10:38.

Rank	Heat	Lane	Name	Nationality	Time	Notes
1	2	4	Mireia Belmonte	Spain	2:07.21	Q
2	2	3	Katinka Hosszú	Hungary	2:07.51	Q
3	1	4	Natsumi Hoshi	Japan	2:07.59	Q
4	3	3	Liu Zige	China	2:07.63	Q
5	3	4	Jiao Liuyang	China	2:07.79	Q
6	3	5	Cammile Adams	United States	2:07.83	Q
7	1	5	Zsuzsanna Jakabos	Hungary	2:07.87	Q
8	1	6	Stefania Pirozzi	Italy	2:08.50	Q
9	3	2	Franziska Hentke	Germany	2:08.51	Q
10	1	3	Audrey Lacroix	Canada	2:09.13	Q
11	3	6	Judit Ignacio Sorribes	Spain	2:09.48	Q
12	2	5	Jemma Lowe	Great Britain	2:10.21	Q
13	2	2	Madeline Dirado	United States	2:10.25	Q
14	2	6	Katerine Savard	Canada	2:10.72	Q
15	1	7	Andreina Pinto	Venezuela	2:10.74	Q
16	3	7	Joanna Maranhão	Brazil	2:11.14	Q
17	1	1	Samantha Lee	New Zealand	2:11.95	
18	2	1	Rita Medrano	Mexico	2:12.41	
19	1	2	An Se-Hyeon	South Korea	2:13.26	
20	3	1	Yana Martynova	Russia	2:13.99	
21	3	8	Quah Ting Wen	Singapore	2:14.10	
22	2	8	Monalisa Lorenza	Indonesia	2:18.24	
23	1	8	Julimar Avila	Honduras	2:19.56	
24	3	0	Maria Far Nunez	Panama	2:22.37	
25	1	0	Pooja Alva	India	2:31.76	
26	2	0	Amboratiana Domoinannava	Madagascar	2:40.51	
	2	7	Ingvild Snildal	Norway		DNS

=== Semifinals ===
The semifinals were held at 18:55.

==== Semifinal 1 ====
Rank	Lane	Name	Nationality	Time	Notes
1	3	Cammile Adams	United States	2:06.75	Q
2	4	Katinka Hosszú	Hungary	2:06.85	Q
3	5	Liu Zige	China	2:07.18	Q
4	2	Audrey Lacroix	Canada	2:07.91	
5	6	Stefania Pirozzi	Italy	2:08.09	
6	7	Jemma Lowe	Great Britain	2:08.53	
7	1	Katerine Savard	Canada	2:10.42	
8	8	Joanna Maranhão	Brazil	2:14.07	

==== Semifinal 2 ====
Rank	Lane	Name	Nationality	Time	Notes
1	4	Mireia Belmonte	Spain	2:06.53	Q
2	5	Natsumi Hoshi	Japan	2:07.18	Q
3	6	Zsuzsanna Jakabos	Hungary	2:07.31	Q
4	3	Jiao Liuyang	China	2:07.70	Q
5	7	Judit Ignacio Sorribes	Spain	2:07.86	Q
6	2	Franziska Hentke	Germany	2:07.87	
7	1	Madeline Dirado	United States	2:08.28	
8	8	Andreina Pinto	Venezuela	2:10.11	NR

=== Final ===
The final was held at 18:46.

Rank	Lane	Name	Nationality	Time	Notes
1st place, gold medalist(s)	6	Liu Zige	China	2:04.59	
2nd place, silver medalist(s)	4	Mireia Belmonte	Spain	2:04.78	NR
3rd place, bronze medalist(s)	3	Katinka Hosszú	Hungary	2:05.59	
4	2	Natsumi Hoshi	Japan	2:06.09	
5	7	Zsuzsanna Jakabos	Hungary	2:06.58	
6	1	Jiao Liuyang	China	2:06.65	
7	5	Cammile Adams	United States	2:07.73	
8	8	Judit Ignacio Sorribes	Spain	2:08.40	
