= Kenta Hirai =

Japanese swimmer (born 1994)

Personal information
- Full name: Kenta Hirai
- National team: Japan
- Born: May 07 1994

Sport
- Sport: Swimming
- Strokes: Butterfly
Medal record
Men's swimming
Representing Japan
Event	1st	2nd	3rd
Asian Games	0	1	0
Summer Universiade	0	1	0
FINA World Junior Swimming Championships	1	2	0
Total	1	4	0
Asian Games
Silver medal – second place	2014 Incheon	200m butterfly
Summer Universiade
Silver medal – second place	2013 Kazan	200m butterfly
FINA World Junior Swimming Championships
Gold medal – first place	2011 Lima	200m butterfly
Silver medal – second place	2011 Lima	100m butterfly
Silver medal – second place	2011 Lima	4x100m medley
Junior Pan Pacific Championships
Gold medal – first place	2012 Honolulu	200 m butterfly
Gold medal – first place	2012 Honolulu	4×200 m freestyle
Gold medal – first place	2012 Honolulu	4×100 m medley
Bronze medal – third place	2012 Honolulu	4×100 m freestyle

Kenta Hirai (born May 7, 1994) is a Japanese competitive swimmer who won the silver medal in the 200 meter butterfly at the 2014 Asian Games. He also won the silver medal in the 200 meter butterfly at the 2013 Summer Universiade, and the gold medal in the same event at the 2011 FINA World Junior Swimming Championships. He also has an additional 2 silver medals, both won at the 2001 Junior World Championships, in the 100 meter butterfly and the 4x100 meter medley relay. He has won a total of 5 international medals, with 1 gold and 4 silver.

== Swimming career ==
=== 2011 ===
In 2011, Hirai competed at the 2011 FINA World Junior Swimming Championships. He won a gold medal in the 200 meter butterfly and a silver in the 4x100 meter medley relay and the 4x100 meter butterfly.

=== 2012 ===
In 2012, Hirai competed at the 2012 FINA Swimming World Cup. He finished 4th in the 200 meter butterfly.

Hirai also competed in the 2012 FINA Short Course Swimming World Championships. He competed in the 200 meter freestyle heats, finishing 30th. In the men's 100 meter butterfly heats, he finished 37th. He also competed in the 4x200 meter freestyle relay heat, finishing 5th, and the 50 meter butterfly heat, finishing 39th.

=== 2013 ===
At the 2013 Summer Universiade, Hirai competed in the 4x100 meter freestyle and the 200 meter butterfly. He finished 5th in the 4x100 meter freestyle, and won the silver medal in the 200 meter butterfly.

Hirai later competed in the 2013 FINA Swimming World Cup. He swam in the 4x50 medley relay, finishing 5th. He also competed in the 100 meter butterfly, finishing 6th, and the 4x100 meter freestyle, finishing 7th.

=== 2014 ===
In the 2014, Hirai competed at the 2014 Pan Pacific Championships in the 100 meter butterfly, finishing 7th.

Later, Hirai went on to compete in the 2014 Asian Games, and winning the silver medal in the 200 meter butterfly.

In October 2014, Hirai competed in the 2014 FINA Swimming World Cup. He swam in the 200 meter butterfly, finishing in 4th.

=== 2016 ===
In 2016, Hirai competed in the 2016 FINA Swimming World Cup, placing 5th in the 200 meter butterfly.
