= 2010 Pan Pacific Swimming Championships – Women's 400 metre individual medley =

Women's 400 metre individual medley at the 2010 Pan Pacific Swimming Championships
- Venue: William Woollett Jr. Aquatics Center
- Dates: August 19, 2010 (heats & finals)
- Competitors: 17 from 8 nations
- Winning time: 4:34.69

Medalists
gold medal	Elizabeth Beisel	United States
silver medal	Samantha Hamill	Australia
bronze medal	Caitlin Leverenz	United States

The women's 400 metre individual medley competition at the 2010 Pan Pacific Swimming Championships took place on August 19 at the William Woollett Jr. Aquatics Center. The last champion was Katie Hoff of US.

This race consisted of eight lengths of the pool. The first two lengths were swum using the butterfly stroke, the second pair with the backstroke, the third pair of lengths in breaststroke, and the final two were freestyle.

== Records ==
Prior to this competition, the existing world and Pan Pacific records were as follows:

World record	Stephanie Rice (AUS)	4:29.45	Beijing, China	August 10, 2008
Pan Pacific Championships record	Katie Hoff (USA)	4:36.82	Victoria, Canada	August 18, 2006

== Results ==
All times are in minutes and seconds.

KEY:	q	Fastest non-qualifiers	Q	Qualified	CR	Championships record	NR	National record	PB	Personal best	SB	Seasonal best

=== Heats ===
The first round was held on August 19, at 10:54.

Rank	Heat	Lane	Name	Nationality	Time	Notes
1	3	5	Elizabeth Beisel	United States	4:34.04	QA, CR
2	2	4	Caitlin Leverenz	United States	4:39.59	QA
3	1	4	Ariana Kukors	United States	4:40.02	QA
4	1	5	Izumi Kato	Japan	4:40.99	QA
5	3	2	Maiko Fujino	Japan	4:41.79	QA
6	2	6	Teresa Crippen	United States	4:42.70	QA
7	3	3	Samantha Hamill	Australia	4:43.86	QA
8	2	5	Miho Takahashi	Japan	4:44.26	QA
9	1	3	Natalie Wiegersma	New Zealand	4:44.26	QB
10	3	6	Alexandra Komarnycky	Canada	4:45.53	QB
11	1	2	Lindsay Seemann	Canada	4:46.65	QB
12	1	6	Tanya Hunks	Canada	4:46.85	QB
13	2	3	Joanna Maranhão	Brazil	4:46.99	QB
14	2	2	Melanie Dodds	Canada	4:51.03	QB
15	3	1	Sarra Lajnef	Tunisia	4:55.90	QB
16	1	7	Larissa Cieslak	Brazil	4:57.28	QB
17	2	7	Carmen Nam	Hong Kong	5:04.91	
-	3	4	Stephanie Rice	Australia	DNS	
-	3	7	Maroua Mathlouthi	Tunisia	DNS	

=== B Final ===
The B final was held on August 19, at 18:57.

Rank	Lane	Name	Nationality	Time	Notes
9	4	Ariana Kukors	United States	4:38.05	
10	5	Miho Takahashi	Japan	4:44.74	
11	6	Joanna Maranhão	Brazil	4:45.29	
12	3	Tanya Hunks	Canada	4:46.38	
13	8	Melanie Dodds	Canada	4:49.64	
14	2	Sarra Lajnef	Tunisia	4:55.95	
15	7	Larissa Cieslak	Brazil	5:04.26	
16	1	Carmen Nam	Hong Kong	5:06.86	

=== A Final ===
The A final was held on August 19, at 18:57.

Rank	Lane	Name	Nationality	Time	Notes
1st place, gold medalist(s)	4	Elizabeth Beisel	United States	4:34.69	
2nd place, silver medalist(s)	2	Samantha Hamill	Australia	4:37.84	
3rd place, bronze medalist(s)	5	Caitlin Leverenz	United States	4:38.03	
4	3	Izumi Kato	Japan	4:40.43	
5	7	Natalie Wiegersma	New Zealand	4:41.93	
6	1	Alexandra Komarnycky	Canada	4:42.25	
7	6	Maiko Fujino	Japan	4:42.28	
8	8	Lindsay Seemann	Canada	4:45.36	
