= Elizabeth Beisel =

American competition swimmer

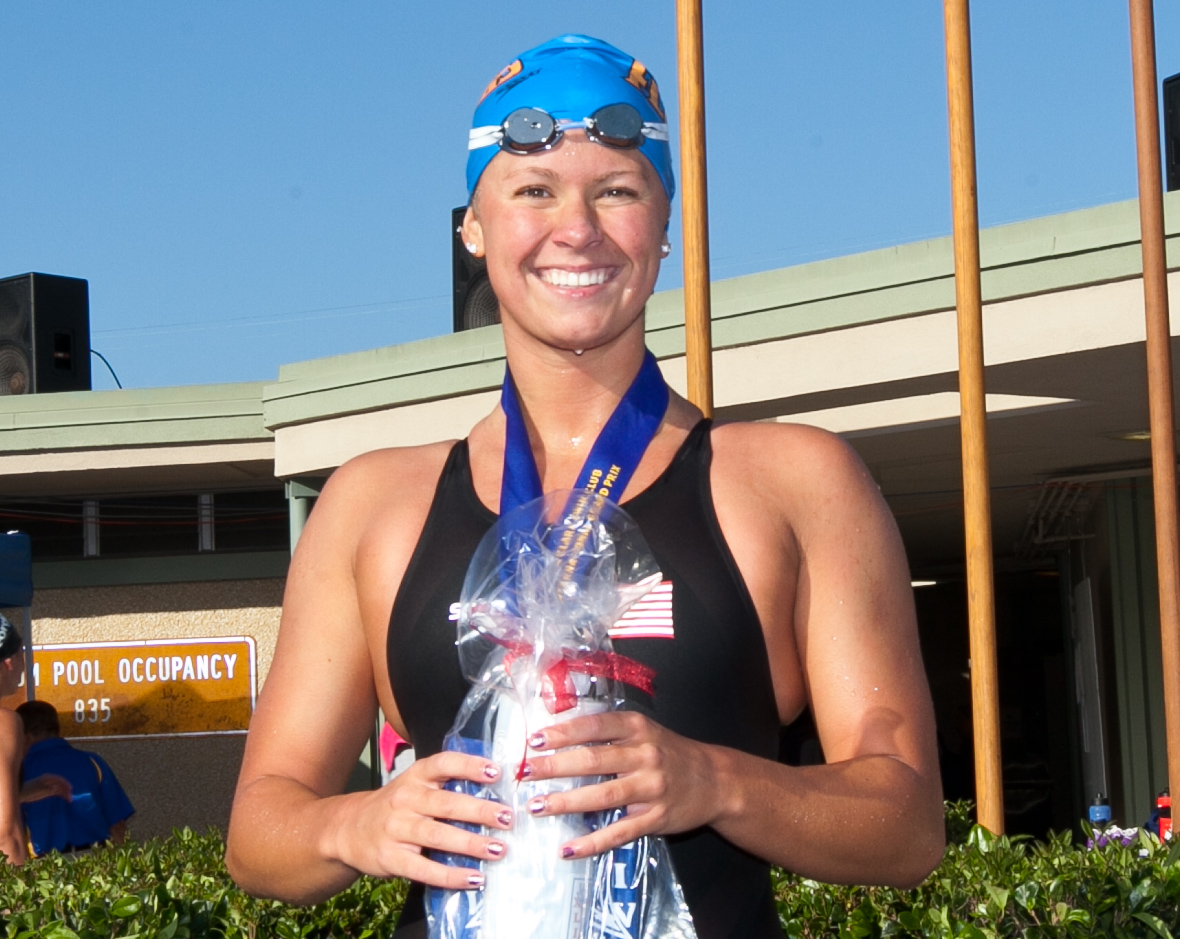
- Beisel in 2011

Personal information
- Full name: Elizabeth Lyon Beisel
- National team: United States
- Born: August 18, 1992 (age 34) Saunderstown, Rhode Island, U.S.
- Height: 5 ft 6 in (168 cm)
- Weight: 130 lb (59 kg)

Sport
- Sport: Swimming
- Strokes: Backstroke, individual medley
- Club: Bluefish Swim Club, Gator Swim Club (Florida)
- College team: University of Florida
Medal record
Women's swimming
Representing the United States
Olympic Games
Silver medal – second place	2012 London	400 m medley
Bronze medal – third place	2012 London	200 m backstroke
World Championships (LC)
Gold medal – first place	2011 Shanghai	400 m medley
Bronze medal – third place	2009 Rome	200 m backstroke
Bronze medal – third place	2013 Barcelona	400 m medley
Pan Pacific Championships
Gold medal – first place	2010 Irvine	200 m backstroke
Gold medal – first place	2010 Irvine	400 m medley
Gold medal – first place	2014 Gold Coast	400 m medley
Bronze medal – third place	2014 Gold Coast	200 m backstroke

Elizabeth Lyon Beisel (/ˈbaɪzəl/; born August 18, 1992) is an American competition swimmer who specializes in backstroke and individual medley events. She has won a total of nine medals in major international competition, four gold, one silver, and four bronze spanning the Olympics, World Aquatics, and the Pan Pacific championships. Beisel competed in the 200-meter backstroke and 400-meter individual medley events at the 2008 Summer Olympics, placing fifth and fourth, respectively, in the world. She won the silver medal in the 400-meter individual medley and bronze in the 200-meter backstroke at the 2012 Summer Olympics. She also finished sixth in the 400-meter individual medley at the 2016 Summer Olympics.

On September 25, 2021, she became the first woman to ever swim to Block Island. The 20 km swim raised funds for cancer research and clinical trials.

In August 2020, SPIRE Institute and Academy signed Biesel to become a swimming ambassador. She will be joining Caeleb Dressel in representing the school. The goal of the partnership with SPIRE and the ambassadors is to emphasize the development of peak performance in athletics, academics, character and life.

== Early life ==
Beisel was born in Saunderstown, Rhode Island, in 1992, the daughter of Ted and Joan Beisel. She graduated from North Kingstown High School in North Kingstown, Rhode Island in 2010. From the age of 12 through high school, she competed for the Bluefish Swim Club while training under coach Chuck Batchelor. Beisel became a member of the U.S. national swim team when she was 13 years old. Beisel's great uncle, Warren William Krech, has a star on the Hollywood Walk of Fame and was called the "King of Pre-code Hollywood." He was also one of the original fourteen members of the Screen Actors Guild.

== College career ==
Beisel accepted an athletic scholarship to attend the University of Florida in Gainesville, Florida, where she swam for coach Gregg Troy's Florida Gators swimming and diving team in National Collegiate Athletic Association (NCAA) competition from 2011 to 2014. She won nine Southeastern Conference (SEC) individual championships, and was honored as the SEC Female Swimmer of the Year in 2012. Beisel also won the NCAA individual championships in the 200-yard backstroke in 2012, and the 400-yard individual medley in 2013, leading the Lady Gators to a seventh, tenth, sixth and sixth-place team finishes at the NCAA national championships. She received eighteen All-American honors and earned first-team Academic All-America recognition.

== International career ==
=== 2007 World Championships ===
At the age of 14, Beisel competed in the 2007 World Championships. She advanced to the semi-finals and placed twelfth overall in the 200-meter backstroke.

=== 2008 Summer Olympics ===
At the 2008 U.S. Olympic Trials, Beisel finished second to Katie Hoff in the 400-meter individual medley with a time of 4:32.87. Hoff went on to set the world record in that race. In the 200-meter backstroke, Beisel finished second to Margaret Hoelzer, who also set the world record.

As a 15-year-old, Beisel was the youngest member of the U.S. Olympic swim team at the 2008 Summer Olympics in Beijing, China. Beisel clocked the best time in the preliminaries of the 400-meter individual medley, and finished fourth in the final with a time of 4:34.24. She had the second fastest time in the semi-finals of the 200-meter backstroke, and finished fifth in the final.

=== 2009 World Championships ===
At the 2009 National Championships, Beisel competed in four individual events and qualified to swim in two finals. In the 400-meter individual medley, Beisel edged Julia Smit with a time of 4:36.31. In the 200-meter backstroke, Beisel finished first with a time of 2:08.80. Margaret Hoelzer, the Olympic silver medalist in Beijing, finished third.

In her first event at the 2009 World Aquatics Championships, the 200-meter backstroke, Beisel finished third in the final with a time of 2:06.39, just missing Hoelzer's American record of 2:06.09. In the 400-meter individual medley final, Beisel placed fifth.

=== 2010 Pan Pacific Championships ===
At the 2010 National Championships, Beisel competed in two events. In the 400-meter individual medley, the defending national champion slipped to fourth place. In the 200-meter backstroke, Beisel successfully defended her national title, finishing first with a time of 2:08.50.

At the 2010 Pan Pacific Swimming Championships, Beisel won two gold medals. Her first gold medal came in the 400-meter individual medley, in which she finished first with a time of 4:34.69. It was three seconds faster than the second-place finisher and was Beisel's first international gold medal. In the 200-meter backstroke, Beisel won her second gold medal with a time of 2:07.83.

=== 2011 World Aquatics Championships ===
At the 2011 World Aquatics Championships in Shanghai, China, Beisel competed in two events, the 200-meter backstroke and the 400-meter individual medley. After qualifying third in both the heats (2:08.40) and semi-finals (2:07.82) of the 200-meter backstroke, Beisel finished in fifth place in the final with a time of 2:08.16. In her second and final event the 400-meter individual medley, Beisel won the gold in a time of 4:31.78. In the heats, Beisel posted the top qualifying time with a 4:34.95. Her nearest competitor, Hannah Miley, was over two seconds behind. This was Beisel's first individual title at a World Aquatics Championships.

=== 2012 Summer Olympics ===
At the 2012 U.S. Olympic Trials in Omaha, Nebraska, Beisel qualified for the U.S. Olympic team by placing first in the women's 400-meter individual medley. In the final, Beisel posted a personal best time of 4:31.74, finishing more than two seconds ahead of teammate Caitlin Leverenz. She also qualified in the 200-meter backstroke by placing second, behind Missy Franklin, with a time of 2:07.58. In her third event, the 400-meter freestyle, Beisel placed fifth in a time of 4:07.29.

At the 2012 Summer Olympics in London, Beisel posted a time of 4:31.68 in the preliminaries of the 400-meter individual medley. She was seeded first going into the finals, and received a silver medal for finishing second behind China's Ye Shiwen with a time of 4:31.27 to Ye's 4:28.46. She also won a bronze medal by placing third in the 200-meter backstroke with a time of 2:06.55, behind American Missy Franklin and Russian Anastasia Zuyeva.

=== 2016 Summer Olympics ===
At the 2016 U.S. Olympic Trials held in Omaha, Nebraska, Beisel qualified for her 3rd Olympic team in the women's 400-meter individual medley. In the finals, Beisel swam a 4:36.81 for 2nd place behind Maya Dirado, who won the event with a 4:33.73.

In Rio de Janeiro, Beisel finished sixth in the final of the 400-meter individual medley with a time of 4:34.98.

=== 2020 coaching career ===
In August 2020, SPIRE Institute and Academy signed Biesel to become a swimming ambassador. As an ambassador she will lead and instruct select classes.

== Personal bests (long course) ==
As of August 2, 2012.

Event	Time	Venue	Date
200 m backstroke	2:06.18	London	August 2, 2012
400 m individual medley	4:31.27	London	July 28, 2012

== Involvement in LEAD Sports Summit ==
Since retiring from her swimming career, Elizabeth has become extremely involved in the LEAD Sports Summit. She has been a part of this organization since 2017 and is currently active. LEAD is a yearly summit that connects young female athletes with Olympic champions and experts through an all-inclusive, 4-day event.

== Survivor ==
Beisel was one of 20 castaways to compete on Survivor: Island of the Idols, the 39th edition of the reality TV show. After starting off as a member of the Lairo tribe, she was selected as the first player to go to the eponymous Island of the Idols, where former players Sandra Diaz-Twine and "Boston" Rob Mariano acted as mentors to the competing castaways using their past knowledge of the game. In Beisel's case, they offered her a chance to receive an advantage if she beat Mariano in a fire making challenge. After losing the challenge to Mariano, she subsequently lost her vote at the first Tribal Council. Later in the season, she was voted out on day 30 in the game. The initial vote resulted in a one-one tie between her and Janet Carbin, due to Karishma Patel playing a hidden immunity idol on herself. Beisel was then voted off in a 7-0 vote, making her the twelfth player voted out, placing 9th out of 20. Beisel eventually voted for runner up Dean Kowalski to win the game.

However, this season is marred by several controversies. One of which is for instances of "inappropriate touching" from contestant Dan Spilo. The production crew strongly mishandled the situation, sparking a lot of controversy that ultimately got Spilo ejected from the game. After the incident, several female players, including Beisel, received backlash from the audience for using this scenario to further their game. Many fans speculate it was due to this drama that Beisel did not attend the season's reunion show.

Beisel is also married to her fellow Survivor castmate Jack Nichting. Coincidentally, Beisel and Nichting were never on the same tribe during the game, due to Nichting being voted out of the game before the merge.

== Awards ==
- 2025: Golden Goggle Awards: Alumni of the Year

== See also ==
- List of Olympic medalists in swimming (women)
- List of University of Florida alumni
- List of University of Florida Olympians
- List of World Aquatics Championships medalists in swimming (women)

== Bibliography ==
- Beisel, Elizabeth with Beth Fehr. Silver Lining. United States, Nico 11 Publishing & Design, January 22, 2020. ISBN 978-1945907517.
