= Lindsay Seemann =

Canadian swimmer (born 1992)

Personal information
- Full name: Lindsay Seemann
- National team: Canada
- Born: September 22, 1992 (age 33) Newmarket, Ontario
- Height: 1.66 m (5 ft 5 in)
- Weight: 54 kg (119 lb)

Sport
- Sport: Swimming
- Strokes: Backstroke
- Club: Newmarket Stingrays
- College team: University of Arizona (2010-12); University of Iowa (2012-14)

Lindsay Seemann (born September 22, 1992) is a Canadian swimmer who participated in the 200-metre backstroke at the 2008 Summer Olympics. At 15, she was the youngest athlete on the Canadian Olympic team.

She was born and raised in Newmarket, Ontario and started her swimming career for the Newmarket Stingrays. Seemann swam for the University of Arizona Wildcats from 2010 to 2012, before transferring to the University of Iowa, where she swam for the Iowa Hawkeyes from 2012 to 2014. She retired from competitive swimming in 2014, having won 18 national races and 48 provincial ones.
