= Miho Teramura =

Japanese swimmer (born 1994)

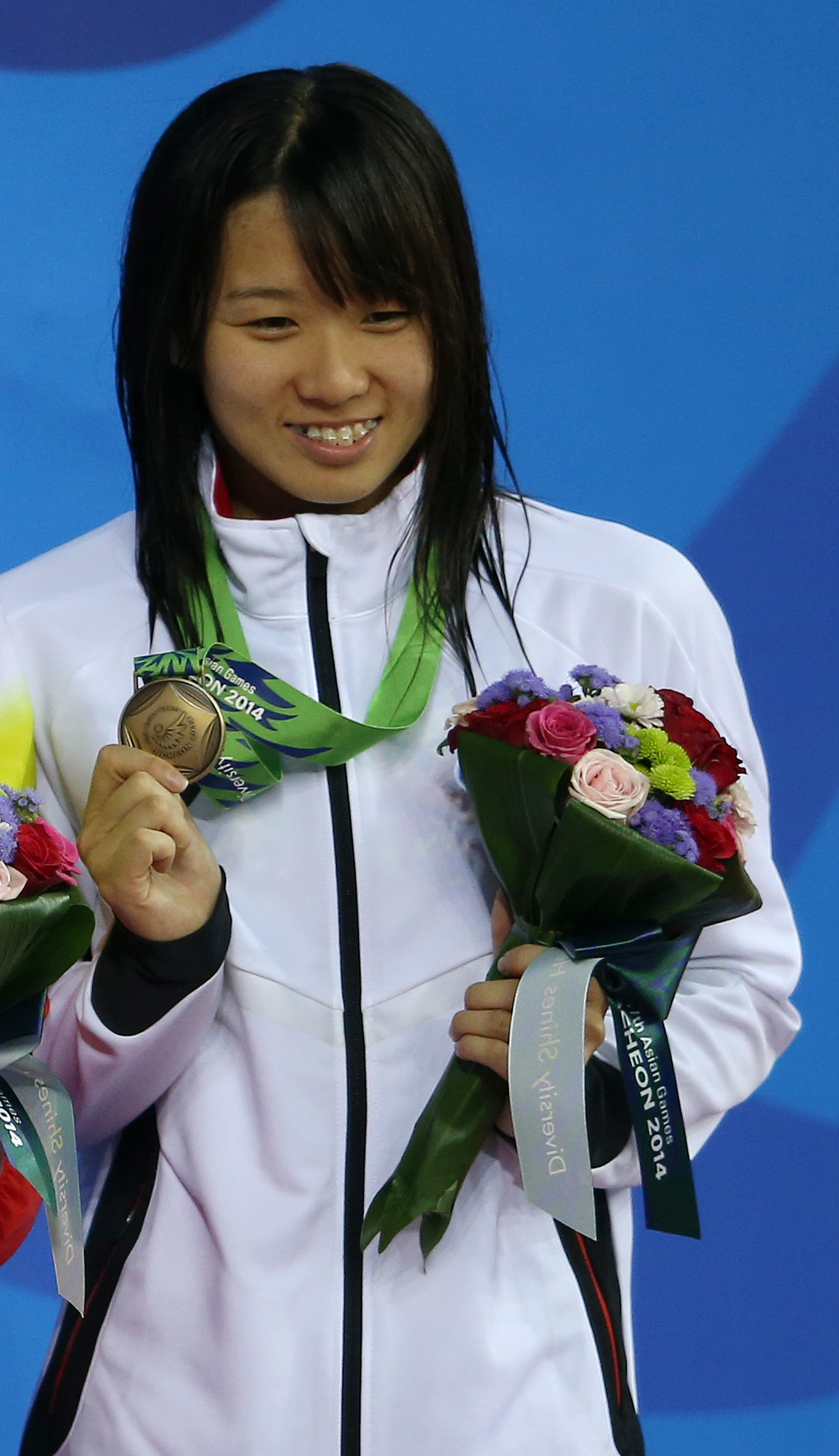

Personal information
- Full name: 寺村美穂
- National team: Japan
- Born: 27 September 1994 (age 31) Nagareyama, Chiba, Japan
- Height: 165 cm (5 ft 5 in)
- Weight: 53 kg (117 lb)

Sport
- Sport: Swimming
- Strokes: Individual medley
Medal record
Women's swimming
Representing Japan
Pan Pacific Championships
Bronze medal – third place	2018 Tokyo	200 m medley
Asian Games
Bronze medal – third place	2014 Incheon	200 m medley
Bronze medal – third place	2018 Jakarta	200 m medley

Miho Teramura (寺村 美穂, Teramura Miho; born 27 September 1994) is a Japanese competitive swimmer who specializes in individual medley.

She qualified for the 2016 Summer Olympics in Rio de Janeiro in the 200 meter individual medley. She swam the 5th best time in the heats and qualified for the semifinals where she was eliminated with the 9th best time.

She represented Japan at the 2020 Summer Olympics.
