= Chelsea Chenault =

American swimmer

Personal information
- National team: United States
- Born: October 19, 1994 (age 31) Walnut Creek, California, U.S.
- Height: 5 ft 11 in (1.80 m)

Sport
- Sport: Swimming
- Strokes: Freestyle
- Club: Trojans Swim Club
- College team: University of Southern California
Medal record
Women's swimming
Representing the United States
World Championships (LC)
Gold medal – first place	2013 Barcelona	4×200 m freestyle
Gold medal – first place	2015 Kazan	4×200 m freestyle
World Championships (SC)
Gold medal – first place	2012 Istanbul	4×200 m freestyle
Universiade
Gold medal – first place	2013 Kazan	4×200 m freestyle
Gold medal – first place	2015 Gwangju	4×200 m freestyle
Junior Pan Pacific Championships
Gold medal – first place	2012 Honolulu	200 m freestyle
Gold medal – first place	2012 Honolulu	4×100 m freestyle
Gold medal – first place	2012 Honolulu	4×200 m freestyle
Silver medal – second place	2012 Honolulu	400 m freestyle

Chelsea Chenault (born October 19, 1994) is an American swimmer who specializes in middle-distance freestyle events. Chenault has been a member of the U.S. national team, winning gold medals as a member of the U.S. teams in the 4x200-meter freestyle relay events at the 2012 and 2013 FINA world championships.

She is also a 2015 World Champion of the 800 free relay.
