= Keryn McMaster =

New Zealand-Australian swimmer (born 1993)

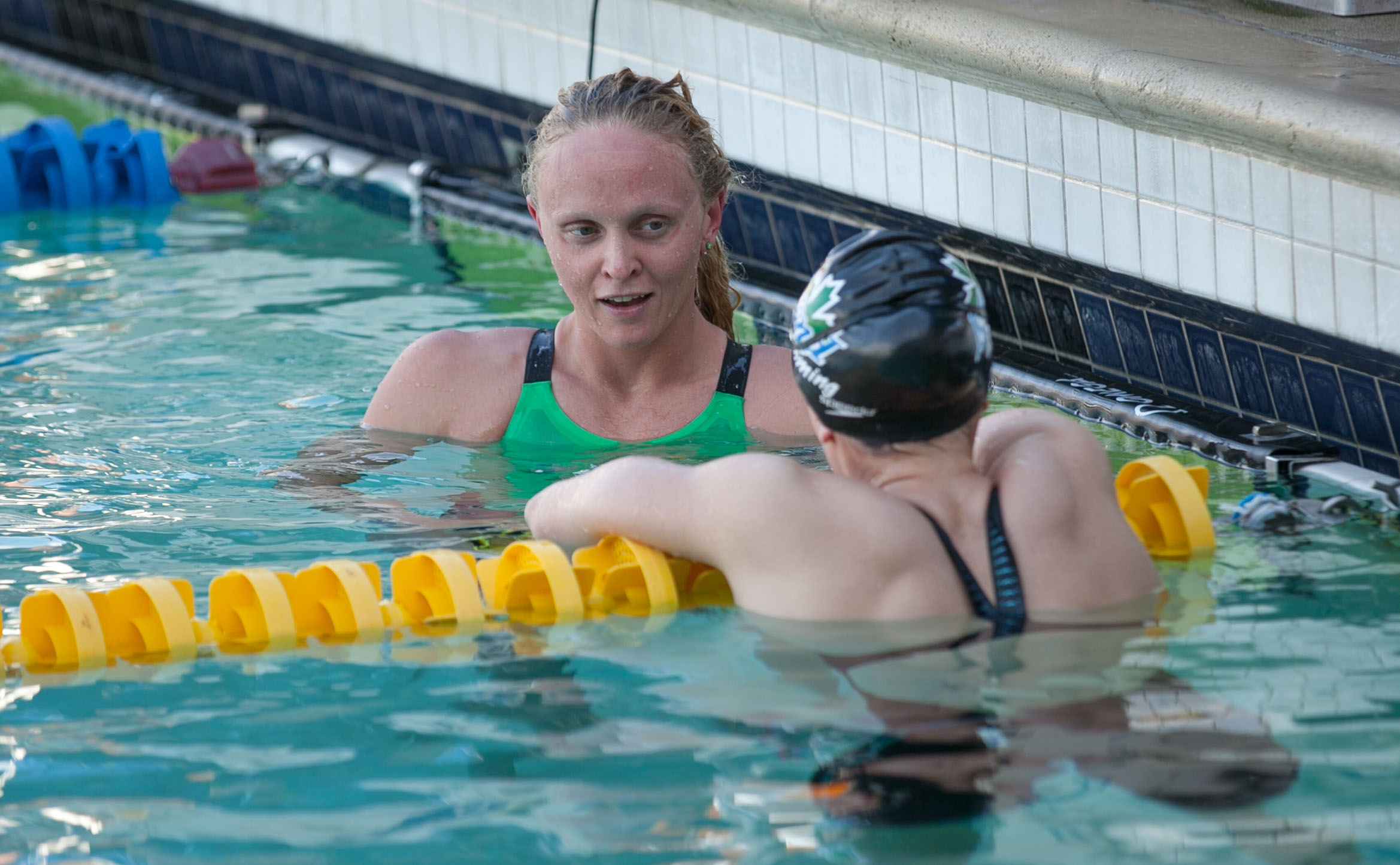

Personal information
- Nationality: Australian
- Born: 19 September 1993 (age 33) Auckland, New Zealand
- Height: 169 cm (5 ft 7 in)
- Weight: 63 kg (139 lb)

Sport
- Country: Australia
- Sport: Swimming
Medal record
Women's swimming
Representing Australia
U.S. Open Swimming Championships
Gold medal – first place	2013 Irvine	400 m medley
Commonwealth Games
Bronze medal – third place	2014 Glasgow	400 m medley
Junior Pan Pacific Championships
Silver medal – second place	2012 Honolulu	400 m medley

Keryn McMaster (born 19 September 1993) is a New Zealand-born Australian swimmer.

She competed at the 2015 World Aquatics Championships and at the 2016 Summer Olympics in Rio de Janeiro.

== Early life ==
She attended John Paul College in Daisy Hill, Queensland.

== See also ==
- List of Commonwealth Games medallists in swimming (women)
