= Miyu Otsuka =

Japanese swimmer

Sport
- Sport: Swimming
- Strokes: Medley

Miyu Otsuka (大塚 美優, Ōtsuka Miyu) is a Japanese swimmer who competes in the Women's 400m individual medley. At the 2012 Summer Olympics she finished 12th overall in the heats in the Women's 400 metre individual medley and failed to reach the final.
