= Erika Seltenreich-Hodgson =

Canadian swimmer

Personal information
- National team: Canada
- Born: April 24, 1995 (age 31),

Sport
- Sport: Swimming
- Club: Greater Ottawa Kingfish Swim Club
Medal record
woman's swimming
Representing Canada
Commonwealth Games
Bronze medal – third place	2018 Gold Coast	200 m individual medley
Pan American Games
Bronze medal – third place	2015 Toronto	4×200 m freestyle relay
FINA World Junior Swimming Championships
Bronze medal – third place	2011 Lima	200 m individual medley
Junior Pan Pacific Championships
Gold medal – first place	2012 Honolulu	200 m individual medley
Bronze medal – third place	2012 Honolulu	4×100 m freestyle relay

Erika Seltenreich-Hodgson (born April 24, 1995) is a Canadian competitive swimmer. She won a bronze medal at the 2015 Pan American Games in Toronto and also won a bronze medal at the 2011 World Junior Championships in Lima.

== Career ==
=== 2016 season ===
In 2016, she was named to Canada's Olympic team for the 2016 Summer Olympics in the 200 individual medley event in which she made it to the semi-finals in Rio.

=== 2018 season ===
In September 2017, Seltenreich-Hodgson was named to Canada's 2018 Commonwealth Games team.
