= 2004 United States Olympic trials (swimming) =

2004 United States Olympic Trials (swimming)
- Host city: Long Beach, California, U.S.
- Date: July 7 – July 14
- Venue: Long Beach Convention Center
- Events: 26 (men: 13; women: 13)

The 2004 United States Olympic trials for swimming events were held from July 7 to 14 at the Long Beach Convention Center in Long Beach, California. It was the qualifying meet for American swimmers who hoped to compete at the 2004 Summer Olympics in Athens.

== Results ==
Key: Highlighted swimmers achieved the qualification conditions to be included in the Olympic team in that respective event.

=== Men's events ===
Event	Gold		Silver		Bronze	
50 m freestyle	Gary Hall, Jr.	21.91	Jason Lezak	22.05	Nick Brunelli	22.39
100 m freestyle	Jason Lezak	48.41	Ian Crocker	49.06	Gary Hall, Jr.	49.16
200 m freestyle	Michael Phelps	1:46.27	Klete Keller	1:46.87	Peter Vanderkaay	1:48.52
400 m freestyle	Klete Keller	3:44.19 NR	Larsen Jensen	3:46.56	Peter Vanderkaay	3:50.15
1500 m freestyle	Larsen Jensen	14:56.71 NR	Erik Vendt	15:11.96	Justin Mortimer	15:13.66
100 m backstroke	Aaron Peirsol	53.64	Lenny Krayzelburg	54.06	Peter Marshall	54.10
200 m backstroke	Aaron Peirsol	1:54.74 WR	Michael Phelps	1:55.86	Bryce Hunt	1:58.70
100 m breaststroke	Brendan Hansen	59.30 WR	Mark Gangloff	1:00.87	Scott Usher	1:01.16
200 m breaststroke	Brendan Hansen	2:09.04 WR	Scott Usher	2:10.90	Gary Marshall	2:13.82
100 m butterfly	Ian Crocker	50.76 WR	Michael Phelps	51.15	Ben Michaelson	52.95
200 m butterfly	Michael Phelps	1:54.31	Tom Malchow	1:57.37	Michael Raab	1:57.71
200 m IM	Michael Phelps	1:56.71	Ryan Lochte	1:59.41	Eric Shanteau	1:59.75
400 m IM	Michael Phelps	4:08.41 WR	Erik Vendt	4:14.09	Eric Shanteau	4:15.08

=== Women's events ===
Event	Gold		Silver		Bronze	
50 m freestyle	Jenny Thompson	25.02	Kara Lynn Joyce	25.11	Maritza Correia	25.15
100 m freestyle	Kara Lynn Joyce	54.38	Natalie Coughlin	54.42	Amanda Weir	54.63
200 m freestyle	Dana Vollmer	1:59.20	Lindsay Benko	1:59.29	Kaitlin Sandeno	1:59.55
400 m freestyle	Kaitlin Sandeno	4:08.07	Kalyn Keller	4:09.78	Diana Munz	4:10.79
800 m freestyle	Diana Munz	8:26.06	Kalyn Keller	8:26.33	Brooke Bennett	8:29.39
100 m backstroke	Natalie Coughlin	59.85	Haley Cope	1:01.24	Hayley McGregory	1:01.94
200 m backstroke	Margaret Hoelzer	2:11.88	Kristen Caverly	2:12.70	Hayley McGregory	2:13.24
100 m breaststroke	Amanda Beard	1:07.64	Tara Kirk	1:07.69	Megan Jendrick	1:07.80
200 m breaststroke	Amanda Beard	2:22.44 WR	Caroline Bruce	2:27.22	Kristy Kowal	2:27.99
100 m butterfly	Rachel Komisarz	58.77	Jenny Thompson	58.98	Demerae Christianson	59.09
200 m butterfly	Dana Kirk	2:08.86	Kaitlin Sandeno	2:09.94	Whitney Myers	2:10.76
200 m IM	Katie Hoff	2:12.06	Amanda Beard	2:12.43	Martha Bowen	2:14.51
400 m IM	Katie Hoff	4:37.67	Kaitlin Sandeno	4:40.39	Kristen Caverly	4:42.57

== See also ==
- United States at the 2004 Summer Olympics
- United States Olympic Trials (swimming)
- USA Swimming
