= Swimming at the 2007 World Aquatics Championships – Women's 200 metre individual medley =

The Women's 200m Individual Medley at the 2007 World Aquatics Championships took place on 25 March (prelims & semifinals) and the evening of 26 March (finals) at the Rod Laver Arena in Melbourne, Australia. 50 swimmers were entered in the event, of which 49 swam.

Existing records at the start of the event were:

- World Record (WR): 2:09.72, WU Yanyan (China), 17 October 1997 in Shanghai, China.
- Championship Record (CR): 2:10.41, Katie Hoff (USA), Montreal 2005 (25 July 2005)

== Results ==
=== Final ===
Place	Lane	Name	Nationality	50m Split	100m Split	150m Split	Time	Notes
1	4	Katie Hoff	USA	28.35	1:01.96	1:39.06	2:10.13	CR
2	5	Kirsty Coventry	Zimbabwe	28.73	1:01.92	1:40.00	2:10.76	
3	3	Stephanie Rice	Australia	28.45	1:02.03	1:40.39	2:11.42	
4	2	Whitney Myers	USA	28.59	1:01.72	1:41.79	2:13.73	
5	6	Julie Hjorth-Hansen	Denmark	28.96	1:03.59	1:42.09	2:14.05	
6	7	Shayne Reese	Australia	28.33	1:03.03	1:42.24	2:14.89	
7	8	Georgina Bardach	Argentina	29.76	1:05.21	1:43.83	2:15.26	
8	1	Julia Wilkinson	Canada	29.51	1:03.82	1:43.87	2:15.28	

=== Semifinals ===
Rank	Heat / Lane	Name	Nationality	50m Split	100m Split	150m Split	Time	Notes
1	H2-L4	Katie Hoff	USA	28.83	1:02.68	1:40.14	2:11.75	Q
2	H1-L4	Kirsty Coventry	Zimbabwe	29.29	1:02.79	1:40.95	2:12.50	Q
3	H2-L3	Stephanie Rice	Australia	28.66	1:02.83	1:41.40	2:12.54	Q
4	H2-L5	Julie Hjorth-Hansen	Denmark	28.88	1:03.70	1:41.58	2:13.14	Q
5	H1-L6	Whitney Myers	USA	28.31	1:02.90	1:42.27	2:13.69	Q
6	H1-L5	Shayne Reese	Australia	28.21	1:03.56	1:42.14	2:14.10	Q
7	H2-L2	Julia Wilkinson	Canada	29.75	1:04.64	1:43.72	2:14.94	Q
8	H2-L7	Georgina Bardach	Argentina	29.84	1:04.81	1:43.39	2:15.08	Q
9	H2-L1	Nicole Hetzer	Germany	29.78	1:04.05	1:44.28	2:15.69	
10	H1-L2	Asami Kitagawa	Japan	29.56	1:05.84	1:43.89	2:15.79	
11	H1-L8	Olga Shulgina	Russia	29.97	1:05.29	1:43.94	2:16.07	
12	H1-L7	Katinka Hosszú	Hungary	29.22	1:03.94	1:44.62	2:16.12	
13	H2-L6	Evelyn Verrasztó	Hungary	29.18	1:03.03	1:45.16	2:16.26	
14	H1-L3	Sophie de Ronchi	France	29.06	1:05.17	1:43.85	2:16.89	
15	H2-L8	Hye Ra Choi	South Korea	29.35	1:04.30	1:44.88	2:17.10	
16	H1-L1	Anja Klinar	Slovenia	29.83	1:05.06	1:45.21	2:17.69	

=== Preliminaries ===
Rank	Heat / Lane	Name	Nationality	50m Split	100m Split	150m Split	Time	Notes
1	H7-L4	Katie Hoff	USA	28.86	1:02.65	1:40.54	2:12.04	Q
2	H5-L5	Kirsty Coventry	Zimbabwe	29.31	1:02.74	1:41.11	2:12.65	Q
3	H7-L7	Julie Hjorth-Hansen	Denmark	28.73	1:03.07	1:41.62	2:13.67	Q
4	H7-L6	Shayne Reese	Australia	28.06	1:02.47	1:41.47	2:13.67	Q
5	H6-L5	Stephanie Rice	Australia	28.87	1:03.67	1:42.70	2:14.18	Q
6	H5-L3	Sophie de Ronchi	France	29.06	1:04.77	1:42.83	2:15.47	Q
7	H6-L2	Evelyn Verrasztó	Hungary	29.31	1:02.83	1:44.30	2:15.59	Q
8	H6-L4	Whitney Myers	USA	29.03	1:03.03	1:43.59	2:15.73	Q
9	H6-L8	Julia Wilkinson	Canada	29.97	1:04.48	1:44.27	2:15.86	Q
10	H7-L3	Asami Kitagawa	Japan	29.62	1:05.27	1:43.51	2:16.07	Q
11	H7-L8	Georgina Bardach	Argentina	29.98	1:04.96	1:44.31	2:16.19	Q
12	H5-L2	Katinka Hosszú	Hungary	29.39	1:04.01	1:44.64	2:16.37	Q
13	H6-L3	Nicole Hetzer	Germany	29.79	1:04.34	1:45.35	2:16.76	Q
14	H5-L1	Anja Klinar	Slovenia	29.91	1:04.63	1:44.50	2:16.77	Q
15	H4-L5	Hye Ra Choi	South Korea	29.56	1:03.59	1:45.08	2:17.21	Q
16	H5-L6	Olga Shulgina	Russia	29.71	1:04.22	1:44.27	2:17.68	Q
17	H6-L6	Yuliya Pidlisna	Ukraine	29.51	1:05.02	1:44.45	2:17.75	
18	H7-L2	Yu Yao	China	28.42	1:04.72	1:46.07	2:17.98	
19	H5-L7	Mireia Belmonte García	Spain	30.45	1:05.62	1:46.30	2:18.04	
20	H5-L8	Malin Svahnström	Sweden	30.53	1:06.43	1:46.24	2:18.60	
21	H7-L1	Sara Thydén	Sweden	29.14	1:04.23	1:45.88	2:18.62	
22	H4-L8	Maroua Mathlouthi	Tunisia	30.92	1:07.61	1:47.02	2:18.91	
23	H4-L1	Melanie Nocher	Ireland	29.65	1:04.01	1:45.99	2:18.92	
24	H4-L7	Louise Mai Jansen	Denmark	29.93	1:07.25	1:46.87	2:18.98	
25	H5-L4	Qi Hui	China	30.37	1:06.66	1:44.71	2:19.05	
26	H4-L2	Hiu Wai Sherry Tsai	Hong Kong	30.10	1:05.78	1:47.97	2:19.29	
27	H4-L3	Mirna Jukić	Austria	31.02	1:07.12	1:45.93	2:19.57	
28	H6-L1	Ji Yeon Jung	South Korea	30.03	1:05.60	1:47.07	2:20.21	
29	H6-L7	Man Hsu Lin	Chinese Taipei	30.45	1:06.35	1:48.07	2:20.90	
30	H4-L4	Nina Dittrich	Austria	29.90	1:06.18	1:47.48	2:21.28	
31	H4-L6	Larisa Lăcustă	Romania	30.24	1:07.57	1:48.19	2:21.57	
32	H3-L4	Tin Wen Quah	Singapore	30.28	1:06.48	1:50.85	2:22.38	
33	H3-L5	Jonay Briedenhann	Namibia	30.78	1:07.08	1:53.46	2:28.92	
34	H3-L7	Maftunabonu Tuhtasinova	Uzbekistan	33.19	1:09.62	1:55.68	2:29.90	
35	H3-L2	Yih Shiuan Chan	Macau	31.72	1:12.08	1:55.49	2:30.25	
36	H3-L1	Katerine Moreno	Bolivia	32.71	1:12.01	1:55.15	2:31.79	
37	H3-L3	I Chuan Chen	Chinese Taipei	31.93	1:12.04	1:56.26	2:31.97	
38	H2-L2	Cheryl Lim	Singapore	32.27	1:13.64	1:55.76	2:32.43	
39	H3-L6	Ilena Murillo Argueta	El Salvador	32.02	1:11.05	1:59.34	2:33.40	
40	H2-L4	Madhavi Giri Govind	India	32.83	1:12.06	2:04.44	2:38.31	
41	H2-L6	Rovena Marku	Albania	33.08	1:15.08	2:02.46	2:39.89	
42	H3-L8	Herinantenaina Ravoajanahary	Madagascar	33.64	1:18.41	2:03.83	2:39.95	
43	H2-L3	Marie Laura Meza Peraza	Costa Rica	33.33	1:12.98	2:05.39	2:40.40	
44	H1-L4	Karen Pujol Zepeda	Honduras	33.18	1:17.44	2:02.87	2:41.28	
45	H2-L5	Razan Taha	Jordan	32.60	1:15.51	2:03.43	2:41.47	
46	H1-L5	Patricia Wellman	Zambia	34.18	1:16.97	2:05.89	2:43.19	
47	H2-L7	Mercedes Milner	Zambia	32.49	1:14.07	2:03.19	2:43.19	
48	H2-L1	Prisca Rose	Mauritius	33.03	1:17.27	2:07.45	2:46.03	
49	H1-L3	Sakina Ghulam	Pakistan	38.64	1:24.82	2:20.19	2:56.56	
--	H7-L5	Laure Manaudou	France				DNS	

== See also ==
- Swimming at the 2005 World Aquatics Championships – Women's 200 metre individual medley
- Swimming at the 2008 Summer Olympics – Women's 200 metre individual medley
- Swimming at the 2009 World Aquatics Championships – Women's 200 metre individual medley
