= 2006 Pan Pacific Swimming Championships – Women's 400 metre individual medley =

Women's 400 metre individual medley at the 2006 Pan Pacific Swimming Championships
- Venue: Saanich Commonwealth Place
- Dates: August 18, 2006 (heats & finals)
- Competitors: 23 from 10 nations
- Winning time: 4:36.82

Medalists
gold medal	Katie Hoff	United States
silver medal	Ariana Kukors	United States
bronze medal	Stephanie Rice	Australia

The women's 400 metre individual medley competition at the 2006 Pan Pacific Swimming Championships took place on August 18 at the Saanich Commonwealth Place. The last champion was Jennifer Reilly of Australia.

This race consisted of eight lengths of the pool. The first two lengths were swum using the butterfly stroke, the second pair with the backstroke, the third pair of lengths in breaststroke, and the final two were freestyle.

== Records ==
Prior to this competition, the existing world and Pan Pacific records were as follows:

World record	Yana Klochkova (UKR)	4:33.59	Sydney, Australia	September 16, 2000
Pan Pacific Championships record	Kristine Quance (USA)	4:39.25	Kobe, Japan	August 13, 1993

== Results ==
All times are in minutes and seconds.

KEY:	q	Fastest non-qualifiers	Q	Qualified	CR	Championships record	NR	National record	PB	Personal best	SB	Seasonal best

=== Heats ===
The first round was held on August 18, at 10:40.

Rank	Heat	Lane	Name	Nationality	Time	Notes
1	3	4	Katie Hoff	United States	4:40.33	QA
2	2	4	Ariana Kukors	United States	4:40.97	QA
3	1	3	Maiko Fujino	Japan	4:44.83	QA
3	1	6	Kristen Caverly	United States	4:44.83	QA
5	3	6	Ashleigh McCleery	Australia	4:46.51	QA
6	1	4	Kaitlin Sandeno	United States	4:47.04	QA
7	3	5	Stephanie Rice	Australia	4:47.26	QA
8	2	5	Jung Ji-Yeon	South Korea	4:47.42	QA
9	2	6	Kathleen Hersey	United States	4:47.45	QB
10	2	8	Xia Chenying	China	4:48.58	QB
11	3	3	Helen Norfolk	New Zealand	4:48.76	QB
12	1	5	Jennifer Reilly	Australia	4:49.13	QB
13	1	2	Kirsty Coventry	Zimbabwe	4:50.34	QB
14	2	7	Elizabeth Beisel	United States	4:50.41	QB
15	2	3	Liu Jing	China	4:51.14	QB
16	2	1	Joanna Maranhão	Brazil	4:51.96	QB
17	3	2	Izumi Kato	Japan	4:52.97	
18	3	7	Alexa Komarnycky	Canada	4:56.14	
19	2	2	Kristen Bradley	Canada	4:56.86	
20	1	1	Stephanie Horner	Canada	4:56.93	
21	3	1	Monica Stitski	Canada	4:57.30	
22	3	8	Melanie Dodds	Canada	5:03.15	
23	1	7	Siow Yi Ting	Malaysia	5:06.46	

=== B Final ===
The B final was held on August 18, at 19:08.

Rank	Lane	Name	Nationality	Time	Notes
9	4	Kristen Caverly	United States	4:45.21	
10	3	Kirsty Coventry	Zimbabwe	4:45.25	
11	1	Alexa Komarnycky	Canada	4:50.37	
12	5	Jennifer Reilly	Australia	4:50.43	
13	6	Liu Jing	China	4:50.60	
14	2	Joanna Maranhão	Brazil	4:50.70	
15	8	Kristen Bradley	Canada	4:52.06	
16	7	Izumi Kato	Japan	4:55.84	

=== A Final ===
The A final was held on August 18, at 19:08.

Rank	Lane	Name	Nationality	Time	Notes
1st place, gold medalist(s)	4	Katie Hoff	United States	4:36.82	CR
2nd place, silver medalist(s)	5	Ariana Kukors	United States	4:39.68	
3rd place, bronze medalist(s)	2	Stephanie Rice	Australia	4:41.83	
4	3	Maiko Fujino	Japan	4:45.62	
5	6	Ashleigh McCleery	Australia	4:46.63	
6	1	Xia Chenying	China	4:47.49	
7	7	Jung Ji-Yeon	South Korea	4:47.83	
8	8	Helen Norfolk	New Zealand	4:48.07	
