= 2006 Pan Pacific Swimming Championships – Women's 200 metre individual medley =

Women's 200 metre individual medley at the 2006 Pan Pacific Swimming Championships
- Venue: Saanich Commonwealth Place
- Dates: August 20, 2006 (heats & finals)
- Competitors: 26 from 11 nations
- Winning time: 2:10.11

Medalists
gold medal	Whitney Myers	United States
silver medal	Katie Hoff	United States
bronze medal	Stephanie Rice	Australia

The women's 200 metre individual medley competition at the 2006 Pan Pacific Swimming Championships took place on August 20 at the Saanich Commonwealth Place. The last champion was Tomoko Hagiwara of Japan.

This race consisted of four lengths of the pool, one each in backstroke, breaststroke, butterfly and freestyle swimming.

== Records ==
Prior to this competition, the existing world and Pan Pacific records were as follows:

World record	Wu Yanyan (CHN)	2:09.72	Shanghai, China	October 17, 1997
Pan Pacific Championships record	Allison Wagner (USA)	2:12.54	Kobe, Japan	August 15, 1993

== Results ==
All times are in minutes and seconds.

KEY:	q	Fastest non-qualifiers	Q	Qualified	CR	Championships record	NR	National record	PB	Personal best	SB	Seasonal best

=== Heats ===
The first round was held on August 20, at 10:00.

Rank	Heat	Lane	Name	Nationality	Time	Notes
1	4	4	Katie Hoff	United States	2:12.45	QA, CR
2	3	4	Whitney Myers	United States	2:12.85	QA
3	4	5	Ariana Kukors	United States	2:13.26	QA
4	3	7	Kirsty Coventry	Zimbabwe	2:15.75	QA
5	2	4	Stephanie Rice	Australia	2:16.38	QA
6	4	1	Kathleen Hersey	United States	2:16.88	QA
7	2	6	Ashleigh McCleery	Australia	2:16.90	QA
8	3	3	Maiko Fujino	Japan	2:17.05	QA
9	3	5	Kaitlin Sandeno	United States	2:17.52	QB
10	3	2	Julia Wilkinson	Canada	2:17.92	QB
11	4	2	Teresa Crippen	United States	2:17.95	QB
11	4	8	Siow Yi Ting	Malaysia	2:17.95	QB
13	2	3	Jung Ji-Yeon	South Korea	2:18.06	QB
14	4	6	Shayne Reese	Australia	2:18.09	QB
15	1	5	Mary Descenza	United States	2:18.27	QB
16	3	1	Joanna Maranhão	Brazil	2:18.28	QB
17	4	3	Helen Norfolk	New Zealand	2:18.35	
18	2	5	Liu Jing	China	2:18.81	
19	2	1	Izumi Kato	Japan	2:18.89	
20	2	7	Stephanie Horner	Canada	2:19.03	
21	1	4	Chen Huijia	China	2:19.14	
22	4	7	Xia Chenying	China	2:19.95	
23	1	3	Tsai Hiu Wai	Hong Kong	2:20.49	
24	2	8	Kristen Bradley	Canada	2:20.80	
25	3	8	Elizabeth Beisel	United States	2:20.95	
26	2	2	Jennifer Reilly	Australia	2:22.01	
-	3	6	Kristen Caverly	United States	DSQ	

=== B Final ===
The B final was held on August 20, at 18:14.

Rank	Lane	Name	Nationality	Time	Notes
9	4	Ariana Kukors	United States	2:12.22	
10	3	Shayne Reese	Australia	2:15.06	
11	5	Jung Ji-Yeon	South Korea	2:17.14	
12	8	Stephanie Horner	Canada	2:18.04	
13	1	Izumi Kato	Japan	2:18.72	
14	6	Joanna Maranhão	Brazil	2:18.73	
15	7	Liu Jing	China	2:18.91	
16	2	Helen Norfolk	New Zealand	2:19.27	

=== A Final ===
The A final was held on August 20, at 18:14.

Rank	Lane	Name	Nationality	Time	Notes
1st place, gold medalist(s)	5	Whitney Myers	United States	2:10.11	CR
2nd place, silver medalist(s)	4	Katie Hoff	United States	2:11.51	
3rd place, bronze medalist(s)	6	Stephanie Rice	Australia	2:13.21	
4	3	Kirsty Coventry	Zimbabwe	2:14.27	
5	7	Maiko Fujino	Japan	2:16.64	
6	2	Ashleigh McCleery	Australia	2:16.75	
7	8	Siow Yi Ting	Malaysia	2:16.92	
8	1	Julia Wilkinson	Canada	2:17.49	
