= Saori Haruguchi =

Japanese swimmer (born 1987)

Personal information
- Full name: Saori Haruguchi
- National team: Japan
- Born: 20 January 1987 (age 39) Ōnojō, Fukuoka, Japan
- Height: 1.67 m (5 ft 6 in)
- Weight: 56 kg (123 lb)

Sport
- Sport: Swimming
- Strokes: Butterfly, medley
- Club: Onojo SC
- College team: Oregon State University (U.S.)
- Coach: Yoshihiro Hanamura

Saori Haruguchi (春口 沙緒里, Haruguchi Saori; born January 20, 1987) is a Japanese swimmer, who specialized in butterfly and individual medley events. She represented her nation Japan at the 2008 Summer Olympics, placing herself among the top 30 swimmers in the 400 m individual medley. On that same year, Haruguchi became the first ever swimming champion in the university's history, when she posted a meet record of 1:52.39 to take the 200 m butterfly title at the NCAA Division I Swimming and Diving Championships in Columbus, Ohio. Haruguchi is a member of the swimming team for Oregon State Beavers, and a graduate of human development and family science at Oregon State University in Corvallis, Oregon.

Haruguchi competed only in the women's 400 m individual medley at the 2008 Summer Olympics in Beijing. Leading up to the Games, she cleared a FINA A-standard entry time of 4:38.94 to seize an astonishing victory over her rival Maiko Fujino and earn her most deserving selection on the Japanese team at the Olympic trials in Tokyo. Swimming against some notable swimmers in heat four, including host nation China's Li Xuanxu, top medal contender Stephanie Rice of Australia, and three-time Olympic medalist Kirsty Coventry of Zimbabwe, Haruguchi commanded an early lead on the butterfly leg, before she faded tremendously at the final turn to endure herself in seventh over Canada's Alexa Komarnycky by a 1.66-second advantage. Haruguchi's prelims time of 4:45.22 was not enough to advance her to the top 8 final, finishing twenty-seventh overall from a roster of thirty-eight entrants.
