= Kingdom City =

Kingdom City may refer to:

- Kingdom City, Missouri
- Jeddah Economic City (formerly Kingdom City)
- Kingdomcity (Church)
