= Swimming at the 2008 Summer Olympics – Women's 400 metre individual medley =

Women's 400 metre individual medley at the Games of the XXIX Olympiad
- Venue: Beijing National Aquatics Center
- Date: August 9, 2008 (heats); August 10, 2008 (final)
- Competitors: 38 from 28 nations
- Winning time: 4:29.45 WR

Medalists
1st place, gold medalist(s)		Stephanie Rice	Australia
2nd place, silver medalist(s)		Kirsty Coventry	Zimbabwe
3rd place, bronze medalist(s)		Katie Hoff	United States

The women's 400 metre individual medley event at the 2008 Olympic Games took place on 9–10 August at the Beijing National Aquatics Center in Beijing, China.

Australia's Stephanie Rice pulled away to a strong finish on the freestyle leg, as she claimed an Olympic gold medal in the event. She established a sterling time of 4:29.45 to slash 1.67 seconds off the world record, set by Katie Hoff from the U.S. Olympic Trials. Zimbabwe's Kirsty Coventry also went under a world record, but earned her first silver at these Games, in an African record of 4:29.89. Meanwhile, Hoff did not match her stellar performance from the trials, as she settled only for the bronze in 4:31.71.

Rising American teenager Elizabeth Beisel finished outside the medals in fourth place at 4:34.24, holding off Italy's Alessia Filippi (4:34.34) to fifth by exactly a tenth of a second (0.10). Great Britain's Hannah Miley (4:39.44), Russia's Yana Martynova (4:40.04), and China's Li Xuanxu (4:42.13) rounded out the finale.

== Records ==
Prior to this competition, the existing world and Olympic records were as follows.

World record	Katie Hoff (USA)	4:31.12	Omaha, United States	29 June 2008
Olympic record	Yana Klochkova (UKR)	4:33.59	Sydney, Australia	16 September 2000

The following new world and Olympic records were set during this competition.

Date	Event	Name	Nationality	Time	Record
August 10	Final	Stephanie Rice	Australia	4:29.45	WR

== Results ==
=== Heats ===
Rank	Heat	Lane	Name	Nationality	Time	Notes
1	3	4	Elizabeth Beisel	United States	4:34.55	Q
2	5	4	Katie Hoff	United States	4:34.63	Q
3	3	5	Alessia Filippi	Italy	4:35.11	Q
3	4	4	Stephanie Rice	Australia	4:35.11	Q
5	3	3	Yana Martynova	Russia	4:36.25	Q, NR
6	4	3	Li Xuanxu	China	4:36.35	Q
7	4	5	Kirsty Coventry	Zimbabwe	4:36.43	Q
8	5	5	Hannah Miley	Great Britain	4:36.56	Q
9	4	7	Katarzyna Baranowska	Poland	4:36.95	NR
10	4	1	Kathryn Meaklim	South Africa	4:37.11	NR
11	3	7	Maiko Fujino	Japan	4:37.35	
12	5	3	Katinka Hosszú	Hungary	4:37.55	
13	5	2	Zsuzsanna Jakabos	Hungary	4:37.86	
14	5	7	Mireia Belmonte García	Spain	4:37.91	
15	3	6	Keri-Anne Payne	Great Britain	4:38.69	
16	5	8	Anja Klinar	Slovenia	4:38.90	
17	2	3	Joanna Melo	Brazil	4:40.18	
18	2	7	Sara Nordenstam	Norway	4:40.28	NR
19	4	6	Camille Muffat	France	4:40.29	
20	3	8	Tanya Hunks	Canada	4:40.63	
21	5	1	Jessica Pengelly	South Africa	4:41.04	
22	3	1	Samantha Hamill	Australia	4:41.89	
23	5	6	Joanne Andraca	France	4:43.88	
24	3	2	Helen Norfolk	New Zealand	4:44.22	
25	2	5	Liu Jing	China	4:44.96	
26	2	1	Jördis Steinegger	Austria	4:45.15	
27	4	2	Saori Haruguchi	Japan	4:45.22	
28	1	3	Nam Yoo-sun	South Korea	4:46.74	
29	4	8	Alexa Komarnycky	Canada	4:46.98	
30	2	8	Susana Escobar	Mexico	4:47.32	NR
31	2	6	Svetlana Karpeeva	Russia	4:50.22	
32	1	6	Quah Ting Wen	Singapore	4:51.25	NR
33	2	2	Katharina Schiller	Germany	4:51.52	
34	1	4	Lew Yih Wey	Malaysia	4:55.83	
35	1	5	Anna-Liisa Põld	Estonia	4:58.21	
36	2	4	Georgina Bardach	Argentina	5:00.87	
37	1	7	Nimitta Thaveesupsoonthorn	Thailand	5:02.18	
	1	2	Maroua Mathlouthi	Tunisia	DNS	

=== Final ===
Rank	Lane	Name	Nationality	Time	Notes
1st place, gold medalist(s)	6	Stephanie Rice	Australia	4:29.45	WR
2nd place, silver medalist(s)	1	Kirsty Coventry	Zimbabwe	4:29.89	AF
3rd place, bronze medalist(s)	5	Katie Hoff	United States	4:31.71	
4	4	Elizabeth Beisel	United States	4:34.24	
5	3	Alessia Filippi	Italy	4:34.34	NR
6	8	Hannah Miley	Great Britain	4:39.44	
7	2	Yana Martynova	Russia	4:40.04	
8	7	Li Xuanxu	China	4:42.13	
