= Swimming at the 2006 Commonwealth Games – Women's 200 metre individual medley =

== Women's 200 m Individual Medley - Final ==
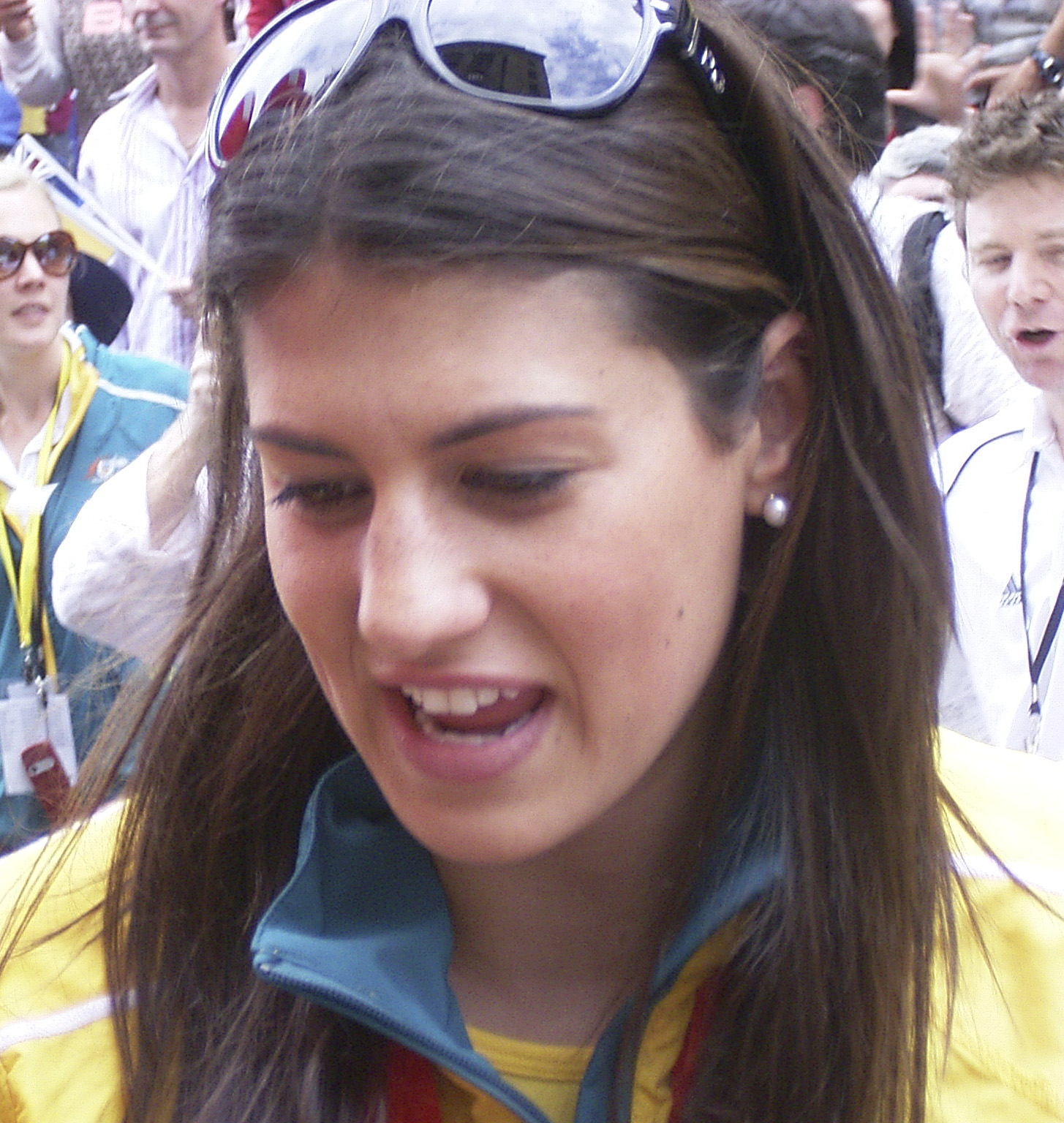
Stephanie Rice

Pos.	Lane	Athlete	R.T.	50 m	100 m	150 m	200 m	Tbh.
	3	Stephanie Rice (AUS)	0.93	28.85; 28.85	1:02.59; 33.74	1:41.86; 39.27	2:12.90 (GR); 31.04	
	4	Brooke Hanson (AUS)	0.75	28.98; 28.98	1:03.62; 34.64	1:41.99; 38.37	2:13.62; 31.63	0.72
	5	Lara Carroll (AUS)	0.84	29.62; 29.62	1:02.81; 33.19	1:41.36; 38.55	2:13.86; 32.50	0.96
4	2	Terri Dunning (ENG)	0.84	28.74; 28.74	1:03.45; 34.71	1:43.51; 40.06	2:15.79; 32.28	2.89
5	6	Helen Norfolk (NZL)	0.84	29.85; 29.85	1:03.93; 34.08	1:43.78; 39.85	2:16.49; 32.71	3.59
6	7	Jean-Marie Neethling (RSA)	0.75	29.58; 29.58	1:05.22; 35.64	1:44.54; 39.32	2:17.64; 33.10	4.74
7	1	Hannah Miley (SCO)	0.90	30.75; 30.75	1:04.96; 34.21	1:46.11; 41.15	2:17.83; 31.72	4.93
8	8	Julie Gould (WAL)	0.71	30.30; 30.30	1:05.81; 35.51	1:47.43; 41.62	2:20.61; 33.18	7.71

== Women's 200 m Individual Medley - Heats ==
=== Women's 200 m Individual Medley - Heat 01 ===
Pos.	Lane	Athlete	R.T.	50 m	100 m	150 m	200 m	Tbh.
1	4	Stephanie Rice (AUS)	0.98	29.23; 29.23	1:04.27; 35.04	1:44.36; 40.09	2:16.44; 32.08	
2	5	Hannah Miley (SCO)	0.77	30.32; 30.32	1:04.99; 34.67	1:45.95; 40.96	2:18.47; 32.52	2.03
3	6	Alia Atkinson (JAM)	0.87	30.65; 30.65	1:10.76; 40.11	1:52.53; 41.77	2:26.34; 33.81	9.90
4	2	Emily-Claire Crookall-nixon (IOM)	0.74	30.85; 30.85	1:08.88; 38.03	1:53.61; 44.73	2:26.78; 33.17	10.34
5	7	Dannie'Lle Van Zijl (NAM)	0.93	32.59; 32.59	1:15.79; 43.20	1:59.16; 43.37	2:34.82; 35.66	18.38
DNS	3	Joscelin Yeo (SIN)						

=== Women's 200 m Individual Medley - Heat 02 ===
Pos.	Lane	Athlete	R.T.	50 m	100 m	150 m	200 m	Tbh.
1	4	Lara Carroll (AUS)	0.81	29.69; 29.69	1:02.84; 33.15	1:41.43; 38.59	2:15.30; 33.87	
2	5	Terri Dunning (ENG)	0.80	29.16; 29.16	1:04.30; 35.14	1:44.27; 39.97	2:17.11; 32.84	1.81
3	3	Julie Gould (WAL)	0.68	30.49; 30.49	1:05.68; 35.19	1:47.40; 41.72	2:21.12; 33.72	5.82
4	6	Marie-Pier Couillard (CAN)	0.73	30.56; 30.56	1:06.38; 35.82	1:49.01; 42.63	2:23.49; 34.48	8.19
5	2	Gail Strobridge (GUE)	0.81	31.06; 31.06	1:08.68; 37.62	1:51.14; 42.46	2:25.19; 34.05	9.89
6	7	Jonay Briedenhann (NAM)	0.73	31.28; 31.28	1:09.84; 38.56	1:56.28; 46.44	2:33.11; 36.83	17.81

=== Women's 200 m Individual Medley - Heat 03 ===
Pos.	Lane	Athlete	R.T.	50 m	100 m	150 m	200 m	Tbh.
1	4	Brooke Hanson (AUS)	0.78	28.93; 28.93	1:04.43; 35.50	1:42.55; 38.12	2:15.26; 32.71	
2	5	Helen Norfolk (NZL)	0.82	29.92; 29.92	1:04.70; 34.78	1:44.66; 39.96	2:16.93; 32.27	1.67
3	6	Jean-Marie Neethling (RSA)	0.81	29.38; 29.38	1:05.34; 35.96	1:45.07; 39.73	2:18.43; 33.36	3.17
4	3	Lorna Smith (SCO)	0.88	31.87; 31.87	1:07.41; 35.54	1:49.81; 42.40	2:23.80; 33.99	8.54
5	2	Olivia Rawlinson (IOM)	0.82	32.92; 32.92	1:10.54; 37.62	1:56.12; 45.58	2:29.57; 33.45	14.31
6	7	Rachel Ah Koy (FIJ)	0.66	31.79; 31.79	1:10.28; 38.49	1:54.25; 43.97	2:29.93; 35.68	14.67
