= Joanne Andraca =

French swimmer

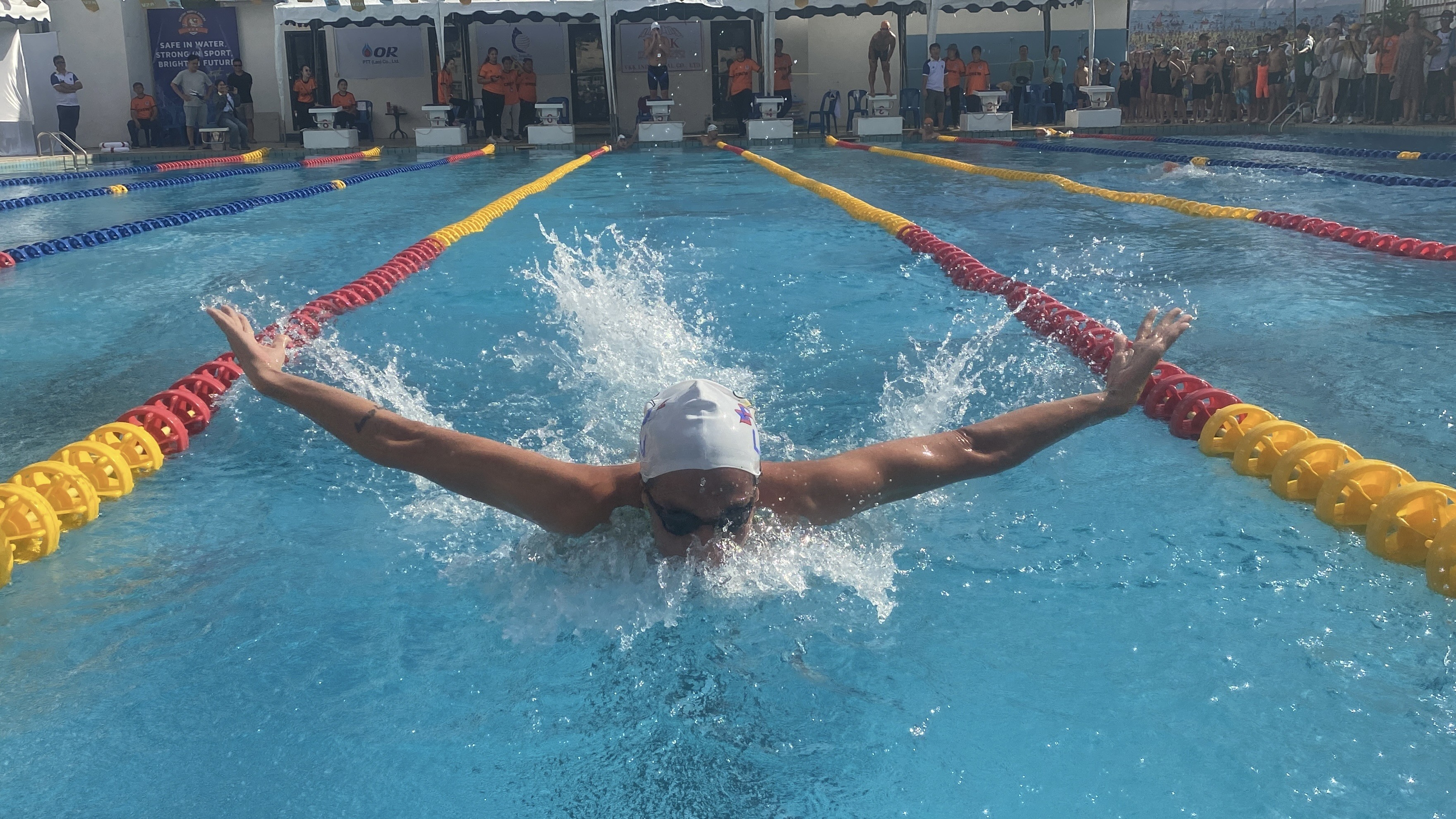
- Andraca swimming 50 metres butterfly on 18/10/2025 (DD/MM/YYYY)

Personal information
- National team: France
- Born: 10 July 1988 (age 38) Hyères, France
- Height: 1.72 m (5 ft 8 in)
- Weight: 58 kg (128 lb)

Sport
- Sport: Swimming
- Strokes: Individual medley
- Club: AC Hyères
- Coach: Annick de Susini (mother)

Joanne Andraca (born July 10, 1988) is a French swimmer, who specialized in individual medley events. She is also the daughter of two-time Olympic swimmers Pierre Andraca and Annick de Susini (her personal coach).

Andraca competed for the French swimming squad in the women's 400 m individual medley at the 2008 Summer Olympics in Beijing. She rocked a sterling time of 4:38.23 to match the French record previously set by Camille Muffat a year earlier, and to dip beneath the FINA A-standard (4:45.10) for a coveted spot on the Olympic team at the French Championships in Dunkirk. Rallying from the middle of the pack with a marvelous butterfly leg in the last of five heats, Andraca tried to maintain her pace with South Africa's Jessica Pengelly by just two seconds apart from each other, before dropping herself badly to eighth in a disappointing 4:43.88. Andraca failed to advance to the top eight final, as she placed twenty-third overall in the prelims.
