= Julie Gould =

Welsh swimmer

Personal information
- Born: 15 February 1989 (age 37) Beveren, Belgium

Sport
- Sport: Swimming
- Strokes: Individual medley

Julie Gould (born 15 February 1989) is a Welsh swimmer.

Gould was born in Beveren, Belgium. As a member of the Wales team at the 2006 Commonwealth Games, she finished 7th in the 400 m individual medley with a time of 4:51.90, and 8th in the 200 m individual medley with a time of 2:20.61.
