= Jeanne Ruark Hoff =

American basketball player

Jeanne Ruark Hoff (born c. 1960 in Mississippi) is a former college basketball player for Stanford University and the mother of singer, songwriter, actor Christian Douglas and Olympic swimming medalist Katie Hoff

== Basketball career ==
An Air Force brat, Ruark lived in five states, the Panama Canal Zone, and the Philippines before enrolling at Stanford University in 1978. She became the school's first women's basketball star: in her freshman season of 1978-79, she averaged 21.3 points and 8.4 rebounds per game and was named to the first team of the Northern California Athletic Conference (in which Stanford women's basketball played from 1977 to 1982). Her 21.3 points per game was a Stanford season record until it was broken by Candice Wiggins in the 2005-06 season.

In 1980, she married fellow Stanford student John Hoff and took the 1980-81 season off. She returned to play two more seasons at Stanford, becoming the first Stanford player to score 2,000 points in her career. In 1982, she helped lead the Stanford women to their first-ever postseason appearance in the 1982 NCAA Women's Division I Basketball Tournament. She is a member of the Stanford Athletic Hall of Fame.

== Personal ==
Hoff and her husband live in Towson, Maryland where she is a part-time health care worker with two children. Her daughter, Katie Hoff, is a swimmer who competed in both the 2004 Athens and 2008 Beijing Olympics, medaling in the latter games.
