= Jessica Pengelly =

Australian swimmer

Personal information
- Full name: Jessica Evelyn Pengelly
- National team: South Africa (to 2014); Australia (from 2014)
- Born: 1 July 1991 (age 35) Edenvale, Gauteng, South Africa
- Height: 1.77 m (5 ft 10 in)
- Weight: 65 kg (143 lb)

Sport
- Sport: Swimming
- Strokes: Freestyle, medley
- Club: West Coast Swimming Club
- Coach: Mick Palfrey
Medal record
Women's swimming
Representing South Africa
All-Africa Games
Silver medal – second place	2007 Algiers	200 m breaststroke
Silver medal – second place	2007 Algiers	200 m medley
Silver medal – second place	2007 Algiers	400 m medley
Bronze medal – third place	2007 Algiers	50 m backstroke
Bronze medal – third place	2007 Algiers	200 m backstroke

Jessica Evelyn Pengelly (born 1 July 1991) is a South African-born Australian swimmer, who specializes in freestyle and individual medley events. A 2008 Olympian, she has claimed multiple South African championship titles and national records in the individual medley (both 200 and 400 m), and won a total of five medals (three silver and two bronze) at the 2007 All-Africa Games in Algiers, Algeria. Pengelly also set two South African records in the freestyle relays at the 2008 FINA World Short Course Championships in Manchester, England, and at the 2011 Summer Universiade in Shenzhen, China.

Pengelly competed as South Africa's youngest swimmer (aged 17) in a medley double at the 2008 Summer Olympics in Beijing. She took the women's 400 m individual medley title in 4:41.35 and eventually fired off a 2:15.22 to crush the national record in the 200 m individual medley at the South African Championships four months earlier in Johannesburg to assure her a place on the Olympic team, both dipping beneath the FINA Olympic qualifying cut.

On the first night of the Games, Pengelly held off the fast-charging French swimmer Joanne Andraca to save the seventh spot and twenty-first overall by 2.84 seconds in heat five of the 400 m individual medley, finishing with a time of 4:41.04. Two days later, in the 200 m individual medley, Pengelly scored a time of 2:15.80 to touch out the daunting Dutch swimmer Femke Heemskerk by almost a quarter of her body-length for the fifth spot in heat two, but missed the semifinals with a twenty-sixth-place finish from the prelims.

Pengelly emigrated to Perth, Western Australia in 2010, after completing high school, where she trains for the West Coast Swimming Club. After major shoulder surgery and sitting out for the majority of 2013 Pengelly made a comeback and returned to the swimming pool. She will compete for Australia at the 2014 Commonwealth Games, in Glasgow. Making her debut for Australia, Pengelly qualified for the final in the 400 individual medley event.
