= Swimming at the 2005 World Aquatics Championships – Women's 200 metre individual medley =

Women's 200m Individual Medley at the 2005 FINA World Aquatics Championships
- Dates: 24 July (prelims and semifinals), 25 July (final)
- Competitors: 38 from 28 nations
- Winning time: 2 minutes 10.41 seconds

Medalists
gold medal	Katie Hoff	United States
silver medal	Kirsty Coventry	Zimbabwe
bronze medal	Lara Carroll	Australia

The Women's 200m Individual Medley event at the 11th FINA World Aquatics Championships swam on 24 and 25 July 2005 in Montreal, Canada. Preliminary and Semifinals heats were 24 July; the Final was 25 July.

At the start of the event, the existing World (WR) and Championships (CR) records were:

- WR: 2:09.72 swum by Yanyan Wu (China) on 17 October 1997 in Shanghai, China
- CR: 2:10.75 swum by Yana Klochkova (Ukraine) on 21 July 2003 in Barcelona, Spain

== Results ==
=== Final ===
Place	Swimmer	Nation	Time	Notes
1	Katie Hoff	USA	2:10.41	CR
2	Kirsty Coventry	Zimbabwe	2:11.13	
3	Lara Carroll	Australia	2:13.32	
4	Whitney Myers	USA	2:13.90	
5	Katarzyna Baranowska	Poland	2:14.39	
6	Brooke Hanson	Australia	2:14.70	
7	Maiko Fujino	Japan	2:15.27	
8	Zsuzsanna Jakabos	Hungary	2:16.09	

=== Semifinals ===
Rank	Heat + Lane	Swimmer	Nation	Time	Notes
1	S2 L4	Katie Hoff	USA	2:11.71	q
2	S1 L5	Kirsty Coventry	Zimbabwe	2:13.40	q
3	S1 L4	Lara Carroll	Australia	2:13.68	q
4	S2 L5	Brooke Hanson	Australia	2:13.83	q
5	S1 L3	Katarzyna Baranowska	Poland	2:13.86	q
6	S1 L6	Whitney Myers	USA	2:14.03	q
7	S2 L3	Maiko Fujino	Japan	2:15.13	q
8	S2 L8	Zsuzsanna Jakabos	Hungary	2:16.30	q
9	S2 L1	Helen Norfolk	New Zealand	2:16.62	
10	S1 L8	Joanna Maranhão	Brazil	2:16.69	
11	S2 L2	Anja Klinar	Slovenia	2:16.77	
12	S1 L7	Elizabeth Warden	Canada	2:17.02	
13	S1 L1	Julie Hjorth-Hansen	Denmark	2:17.09	
14	S2 L7	Yoo-Sun Nam	South Korea	2:17.57	
15	S1 L2	Ji Yeon Jung	South Korea	2:17.91	
16	S2 L6	Yafei Zhou	China	2:18.29	

=== Preliminaries ===
Rank	Heat + Lane	Swimmer	Nation	Time	Notes
1	H5 L4	Katie Hoff	United States	2:12.38	q
2	H5 L5	Lara Carroll	Australia	2:13.67	q
3	H3 L4	Brooke Hanson	Australia	2:14.49	q
4	H4 L4	Kirsty Coventry	Zimbabwe	2:14.51	q
5	H3 L2	Maiko Fujino	Japan	2:15.45	q
6	H3 L5	Katarzyna Baranowska	China	2:15.46	q
7	H4 L3	Yafei Zhou	China	2:16.03	q
8	H4 L5	Whitney Myers	United States	2:16.50	q
9	H5 L2	Anja Klinar	Slovenia	2:16.61	q
10	H3 L1	Ji Yeon Jung	South Korea	2:16.84	q
11	H5 L8	Yoo-Sun Nam	South Korea	2:16.92	q
12	H4 L2	Elizabeth Warden	Canada	2:16.95	q
13	H3 L3	Helen Norfolk	New Zealand	2:17.04	q
14	H5 L7	Julie Hjorth-Hansen	Denmark	2:17.28	q
15	H3 L6	Zsuzsanna Jakabos	Hungary	2:17.36	q
16	H5 L3	Joanna Maranhão	Brazil	2:17.41	q
17	H4 L6	Jing Zhao	China	2:17.83	
18	H3 L7	Aiko Morishita	Japan	2:18.14	
19	H4 L7	Man-Hsu Lin	Chinese Taipei	2:18.59	
20	H4 L1	Daria Beliakina	Russia	2:18.67	
21	H5 L1	Simona Păduraru	Romania	2:19.38	
22	H4 L8	Nina Dittrich	Austria	2:19.76	
23	H5 L6	Georgina Bardach	Argentina	2:19.89	
24	H2 L4	Louise Jansen	Denmark	2:20.34	
25	H3 L8	Yi Ting Siow	Malaysia	2:22.36	
26	H2 L5	Joscelin Yeo	Singapore	2:22.72	
27	H2 L6	Alia Atkinson	Jamaica	2:26.08	
28	H2 L7	Ragnheiður Ragnarsdóttir	Iceland	2:27.97	
29	H2 L1	Khadija Ciss	Senegal	2:28.41	
30	H2 L3	Mylene Ong	Singapore	2:29.80	
31	H1 L4	Dannielle Van Zijl	Namibia	2:30.61	
32	H2 L2	Laura Rodriguez	Dominican Republic	2:30.87	
33	H1 L5	Imane Boulaamane	Morocco	2:33.61	
34	H2 L8	Jonay Briedenhann	Namibia	2:34.15	
35	H1 L3	Parita Parekh	India	2:41.05	
36	H1 L6	Kiran Khan	Pakistan	2:41.75	
37	H1 L7	Sana Wahid	Pakistan	2:57.68	
38	H1 L2	Aminath Rouya	Maldives	3:02.89	
