= Stephanie Rice =

Australian swimmer (born 1988)

Stephanie Rice OAM
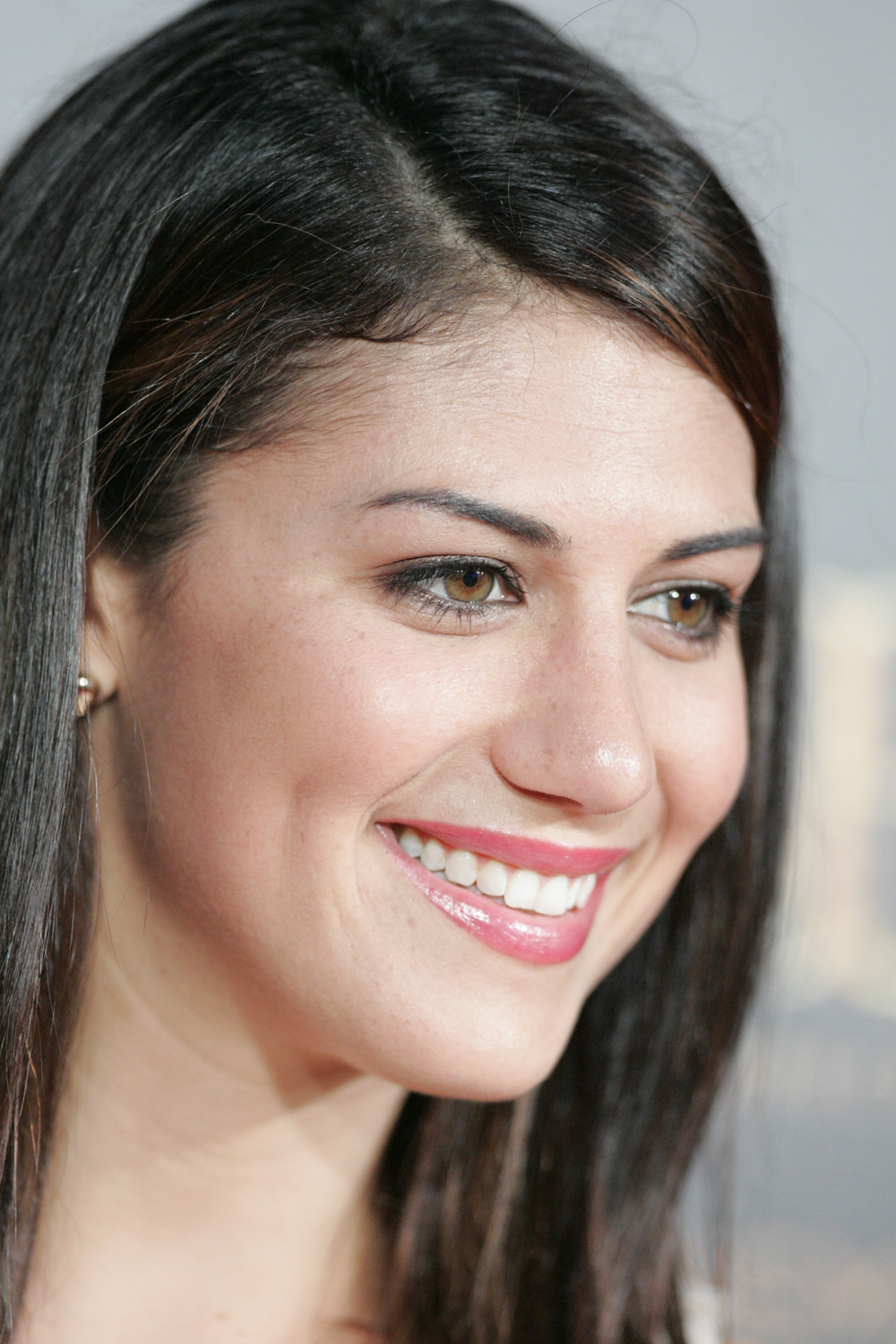

Personal information
- Full name: Stephanie Louise Rice
- Nickname: "Steph"
- National team: Australia
- Born: 17 June 1988 (age 38) Brisbane, Queensland, Australia
- Height: 1.76 m (5 ft 9 in)
- Weight: 67 kg (148 lb)

Sport
- Sport: Swimming
- Strokes: Medley, freestyle, butterfly
- Club: St Peters Western
- Coach: Michael Bohl
Medal record
Women's swimming
Representing Australia
Event	1st	2nd	3rd
Olympic Games	3	0	0
World Championships (LC)	0	2	5
Pan Pacific Championships	0	0	2
Commonwealth Games	2	0	0
Total	5	2	7
Olympic Games
Gold medal – first place	2008 Beijing	200 m medley
Gold medal – first place	2008 Beijing	400 m medley
Gold medal – first place	2008 Beijing	4×200 m freestyle
World Championships (LC)
Silver medal – second place	2009 Rome	200 m medley
Silver medal – second place	2009 Rome	4×100 m medley
Bronze medal – third place	2007 Melbourne	200 m medley
Bronze medal – third place	2007 Melbourne	400 m medley
Bronze medal – third place	2009 Rome	400 m medley
Bronze medal – third place	2011 Shanghai	400 m medley
Bronze medal – third place	2011 Shanghai	4×100 m medley
Pan Pacific Championships
Bronze medal – third place	2006 Victoria	200 m medley
Bronze medal – third place	2006 Victoria	400 m medley
Commonwealth Games
Gold medal – first place	2006 Melbourne	200 m medley
Gold medal – first place	2006 Melbourne	400 m medley

Stephanie Louise Rice, OAM (born 17 June 1988) is an Australian former competitive swimmer. She won three gold medals at the 2008 Summer Olympics in Beijing, and was awarded the Medal of the Order of Australia on 26 January 2009.

On 9 April 2014, she confirmed her retirement from swimming. In early 2024, Rice announced her conversion to Christianity.

== Career ==
Rice was the gold medallist in the 200-metre individual medley at the 2006 Commonwealth Games in Melbourne, Australia, where she defeated Olympians Brooke Hanson and Lara Carroll in a time of 2:12.90, a personal best by 1.19 seconds. She also won the 400-metre individual medley.

=== 2007 World Championships ===
Rice won bronze in the 200- and 400-metre individual medleys. In the 200-metre final, she recorded a time of 2:11.42, a second below the previous Australian record, behind American Katie Hoff in 2:10.13, and Kirsty Coventry of Zimbabwe, who claimed second place. In the 400-metre final, Rice recorded a new personal best time of 4:41.19, shaving 0.54 of a second off her previous best.

2007 World Championships Events
Final medal count: 2 (0 gold, 0 silver, 2 bronze)
Event	Time	Place	
200 m IM	2:11.42	Bronze	AR
400 m IM	4:41.19	Bronze	
4 × 200 m Freestyle Relay	7:56.42	4th	

=== 2007 Other events ===
Rice set a new personal best time of 4:40.79 in the 400-metre individual medley at an Italian meet in June 2007, edging closer to the 4:40 barrier in the event.

At the 2007 Japanese Open Championships, Rice won silver behind Zimbabwean champion Kirsty Coventry in the 400-metre individual medley. In doing so, she smashed her personal best time by 3.61 seconds, cracking the 4:40 barrier and setting a new Australian and Commonwealth record of 4:37.18.

=== 2008 Australian Olympic Trials ===
At the 2008 Australian Olympic trials, Rice broke the world record in both the 400- and 200-metre individual medleys. In the 400-metre individual medley, she clocked 4:31.46, 1.43 seconds below American Katie Hoff's mark of 4:32.89. (Hoff retook the world record at the U.S. Olympic Trials on 29 June 2008, with a time of 4:31.12). In the 200-metre, she clocked 2:08.92 seconds, taking almost a second off the previous record held by China's Wu Yanyan.

=== 2008 Summer Olympics ===
In Beijing, Rice won three gold medals (each in world record time) in the 200- and 400-metre individual medley events and in the 4×200-metre freestyle relay. In winning the 400-metre individual medley, Rice won her first Olympic medal, Australia's first gold medal of the games and their 400th Summer Olympic medal. Recording a time of 4:29.45, she reclaimed the world record from Hoff, bettering the mark by 1.67 seconds, and became the first woman to break the 4:30 mark in the event. (Kirsty Coventry also went under 4:30 in taking the silver.)

Her second gold medal of 2008 Games came on 13 August in the 200-metre individual medley with a new world record time of 2:08.45. Rice prevailed after being neck and neck with Coventry throughout the last 50 metres, who once again followed Rice to beat the old world record. On 14 August she won her third gold medal as part of the 4×200-metre freestyle relay team. She led off the team and Australia was in second place at the end of her leg.

2008 Summer Olympics Events
Final medal count: 3 (3 gold, 0 silver, 0 bronze)
Event	Time	Place	
200 m IM	2:08.45	Gold	WR
400 m IM	4:29.45	Gold	WR
4 × 200 m Freestyle Relay	7:44.31	Gold	WR

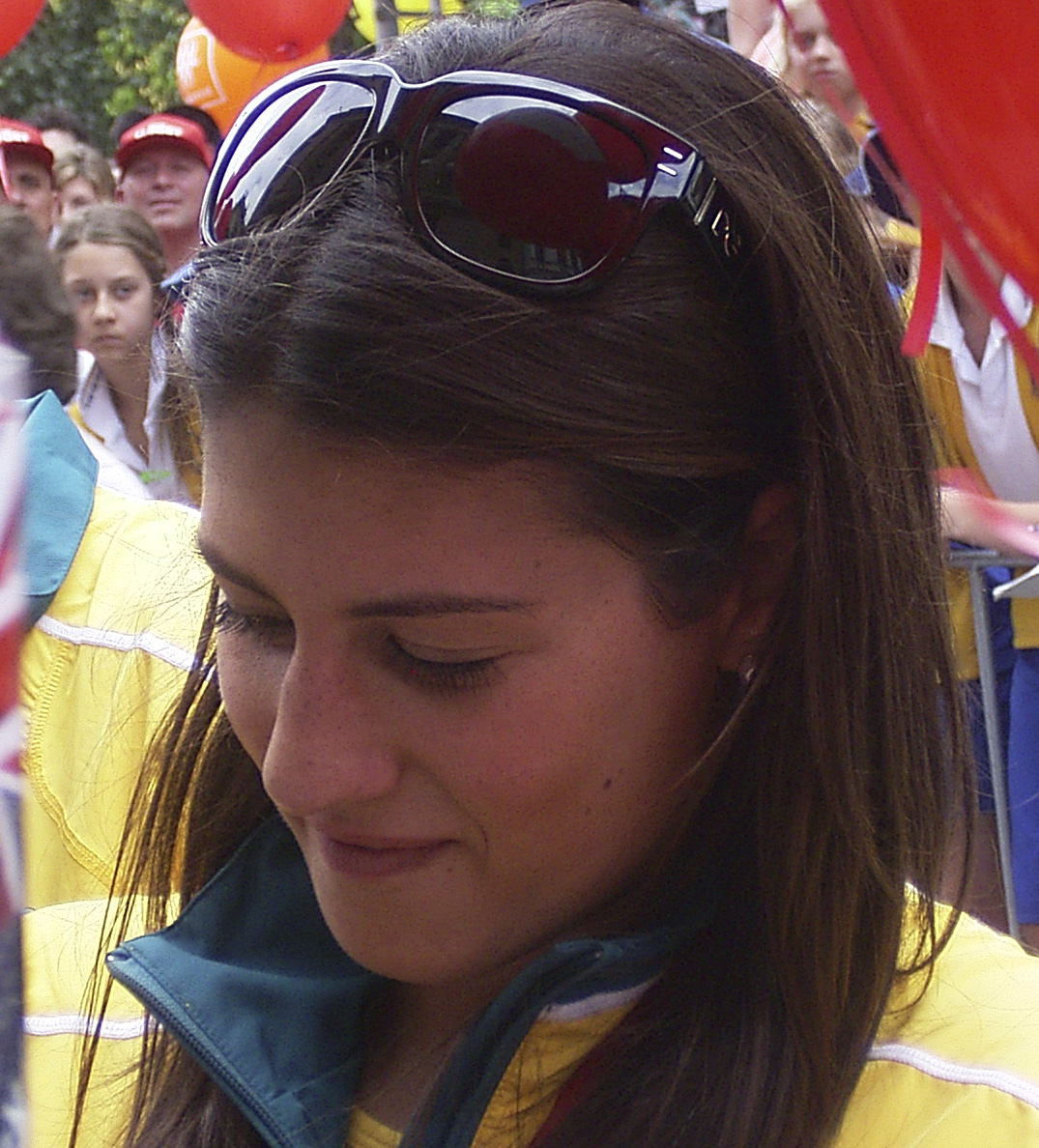
Rice at the Brisbane Olympic Homecoming Parade after 2008 Summer Olympics

=== 2009 World Championships ===
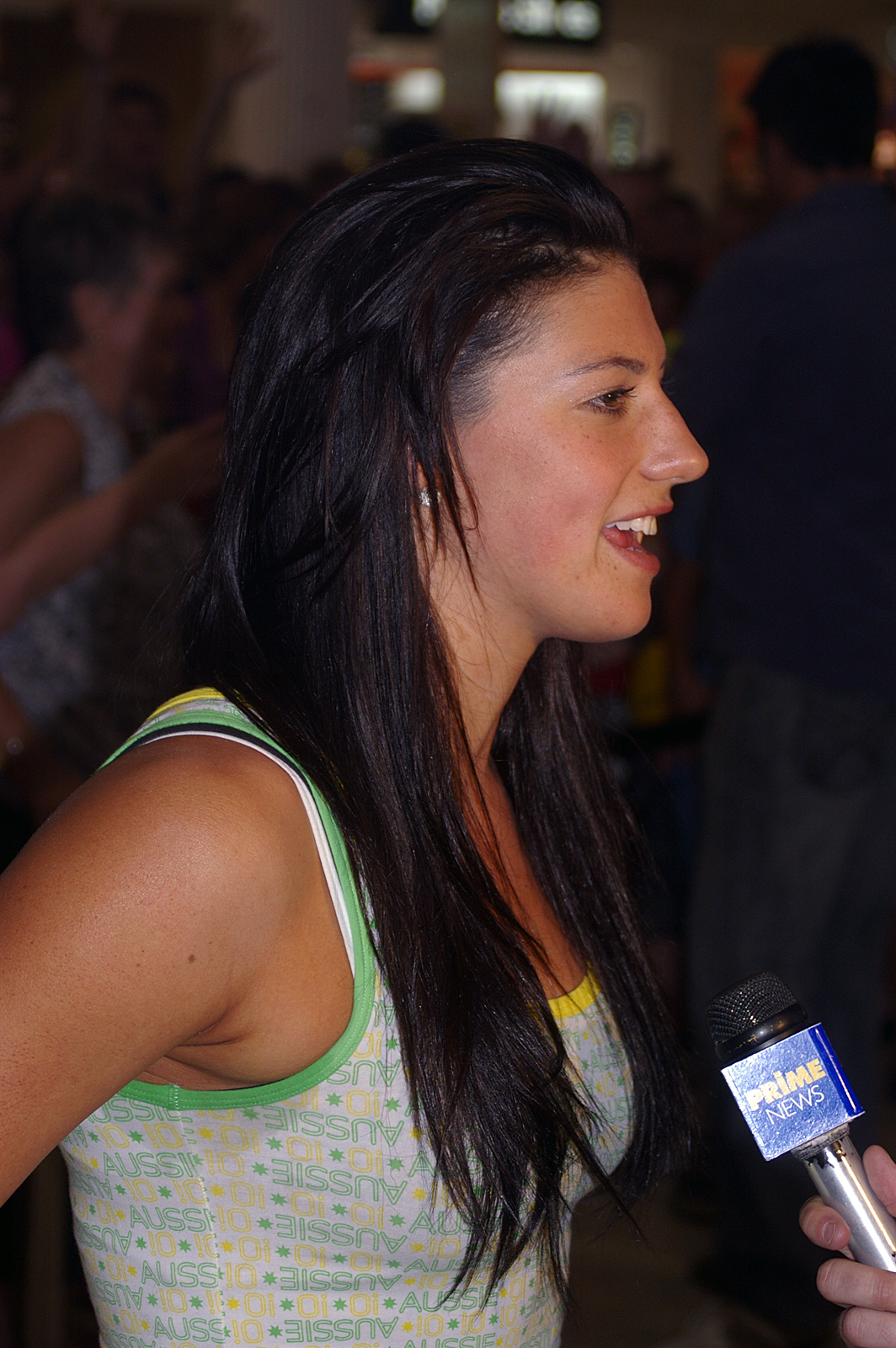
Rice interviewed by local media in Wagga Wagga in January 2010.

Rice began the meet with a solid performance in the 200-metre individual medley. Despite losing her world record, she sliced 1.42 seconds off her personal best time while capturing a silver medal. Experimenting with the 200-metre freestyle did not end well as she failed to make the final. With the absence of Linda Mackenzie, Kylie Palmer and Meagan Nay, the team was never in medal contention, finishing 5th. Rice retained her 400-metre individual medley record however finished with a bronze in the final. She was awarded a silver medal for her contributions in the medley relay heats.

2009 World Championships Events
Final medal count: 3 (0 gold, 2 silver, 1 bronze)
Event	Time	Place	
200 m IM	2:07.03	Silver	AR
400 m IM	4:32.29	Bronze	
200 m freestyle	1:58.33	16th	
4 × 200 m freestyle relay	7:46.85	5th	
4 × 100 m medley relay (heats)	3:58.36	Silver	

=== World Aquatics Championships 2011 ===
Rice competed in the 200 m and 400 m individual medley. She failed to win a medal in 200 m medley finishing 4th in 2:09:65. In the 400 m medley she won a bronze medal with a time of 4:34:23, losing out on the silver by a deficit of 0.01 to Hannah Miley.

=== 2012 Olympics ===
Rice competed in London after undergoing three shoulder surgeries between the two Olympics. She finished fourth in 200 m individual medley and a joint sixth in 400 m medley. The London Olympics was her last stop as a swimmer and she eventually announced her retirement in April 2014.

=== Personal bests ===
Rice had a personal best of 2:07:03 in the 200 m individual medley achieved at the World Aquatic championships, Rome in 2009 and a personal best of 4:29:45 in the 400 m individual medley achieved during her gold winning effort at the Summer Olympics 2008.

=== Awards ===
- 2008 – Telstra Australian Swimmer of the Year.
- 2008 – Swimming World Magazine Female World Swimmer of the Year as well as Pacific Rim Swimmer of the Year
- 2009 – awarded the Medal of the Order of Australia
- 2019 – International Swimming Hall of Fame inductee
- 2019 – Sport Australia Hall of Fame inductee

== Personal life ==
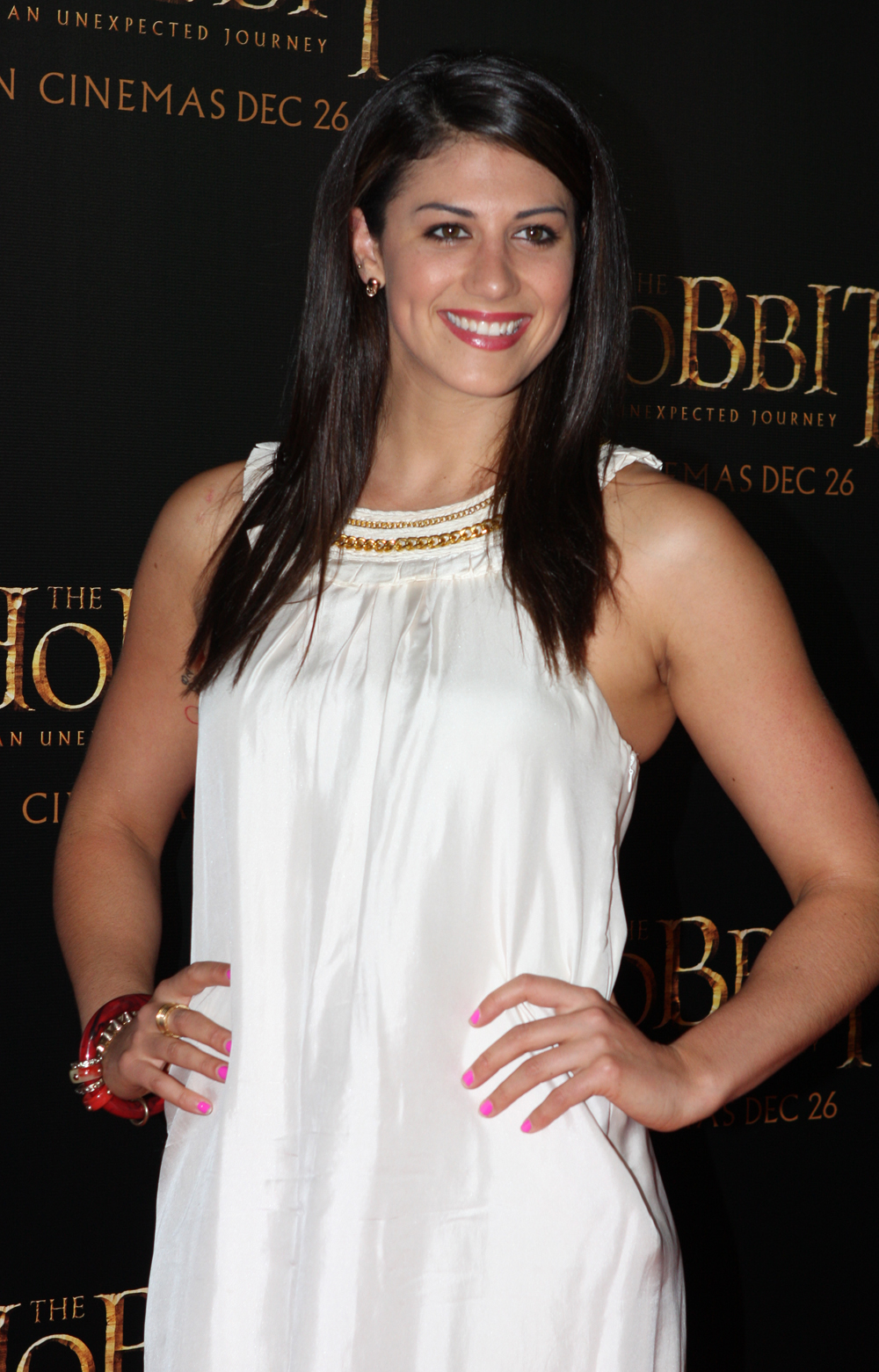
Rice in 2012

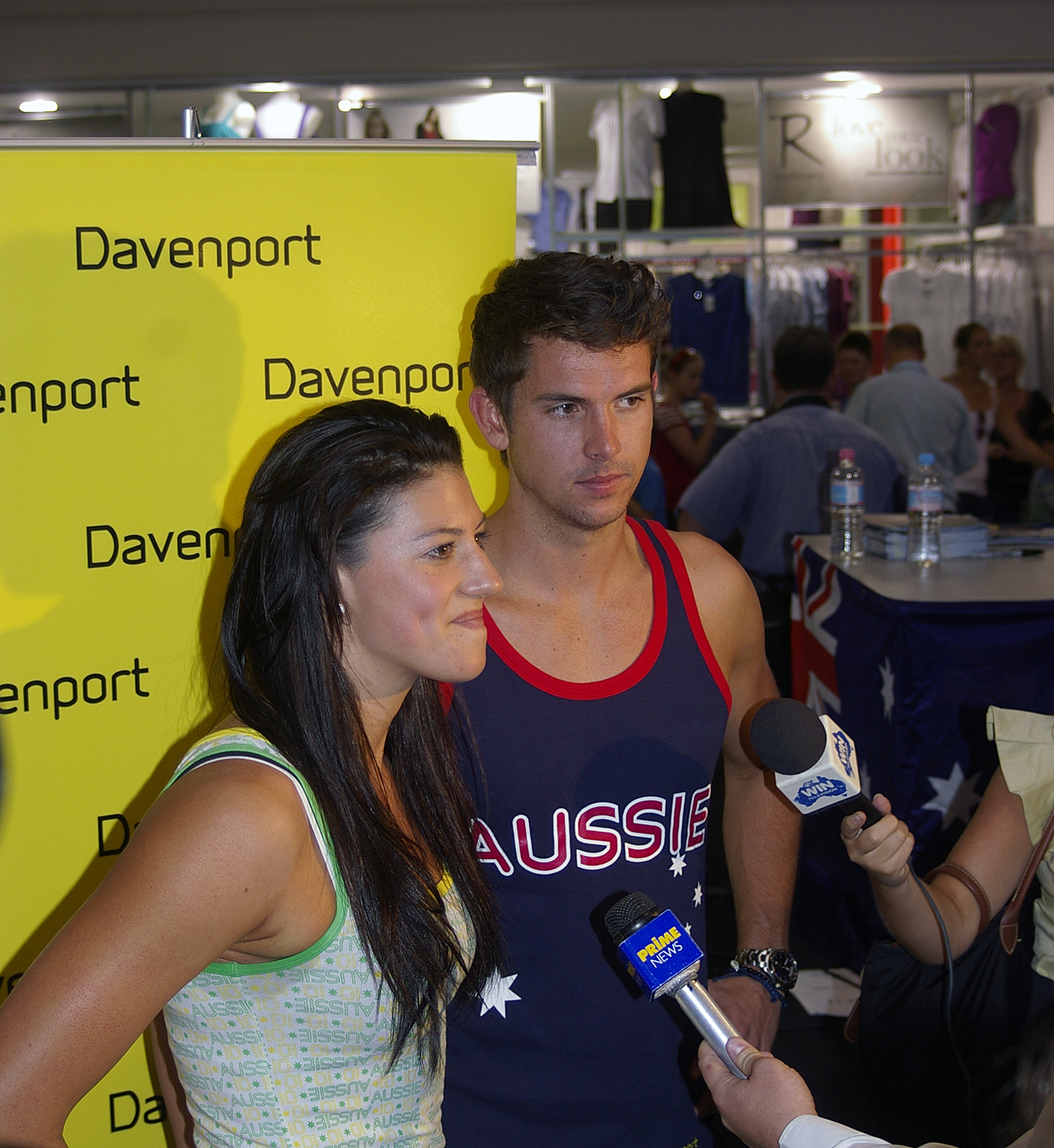
Rice and Eamon Sullivan in 2010

On 17 June 1988, Rice was born in Brisbane to Raelene Clark and Warren Rice.

Rice attended Clayfield College in her high school years in Brisbane, Queensland.

In September 2010, Rice came under fire when she made a homophobic comment on Twitter, relating to a rugby union match in which the Australian Wallabies defeated the South African Springboks. Rice's Twitter message said "Suck on that faggots!". Rice later removed the remark and apologised for it. As a result of the incident Rice lost her sponsorship with Jaguar Cars, and was forced to return her Jaguar XF.

Rice was previously in a relationship with rugby union player, Quade Cooper.

In 2013, Rice won season 3 of The Celebrity Apprentice Australia.

In early 2024, Rice posted a series of videos online documenting her conversion to "born-again Christianity". An Instagram post on January 7 showed her being baptised. Initial reports of Rice's was involvement in Pentecostal multi-site church Kingdomcity were confirmed when, on January 10, 2025, she married Kingdomcity pastor Mark Lassey in Perth. Lassey spends his time preaching in Perth and in Dubai.

== See also ==
- List of multiple Olympic gold medalists at a single Games
- List of Olympic medalists in swimming (women)
- List of World Aquatics Championships medalists in swimming (women)
- List of Commonwealth Games medallists in swimming (women)
- World record progression 200 metres individual medley
- World record progression 400 metres individual medley
- World record progression 4 × 200 metres freestyle relay

Records
Preceded by Wu Yanyan	Women's 200-metre individual medley world record-holder (long course); 25 March 2008 – 26 July 2009	Succeeded by Ariana Kukors
Preceded by Katie Hoff	Women's 400-metre individual medley world record-holder (long course); 22 March 2008 – 29 June 2008	Succeeded by Katie Hoff
Preceded by Katie Hoff	Women's 400-metre individual medley world record-holder (long course); 10 August 2008 – 28 July 2012	Succeeded by Ye Shiwen
Awards
Preceded by Laure Manaudou	World Swimmer of the Year; 2008	Succeeded by Federica Pellegrini
Preceded by Libby Trickett	Pacific Rim Swimmer of the Year; 2008	Succeeded by Jessicah Schipper
Preceded by Libby Trickett	Australian Swimmer of the Year; 2008	Succeeded by Jessicah Schipper
