= Swimming at the 2006 Commonwealth Games – Women's 400 metre individual medley =

The article provides table of standings of Women's 400 metres individual medley final and Women's 400 metres individual medley heats.

== Final ==
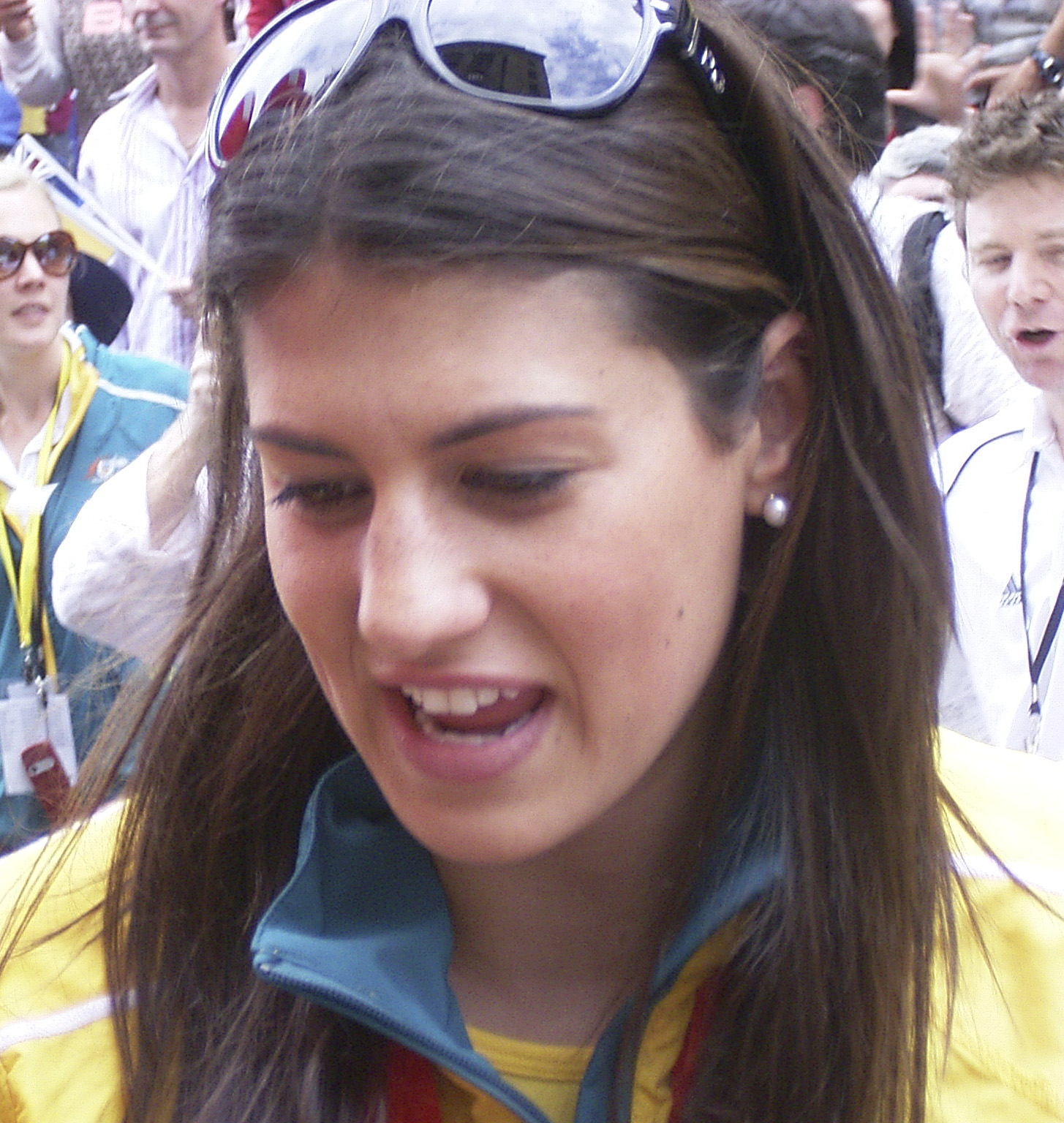
Stephanie Rice

The Women's 400 metres individual medley final was held at the Melbourne Sports and Aquatic Centre on the 21 March 2006 at 19:38 AEST.

Rank	Lane	Swimmer	R.T.	50 m	100 m	150 m	200 m	250 m	300 m	350 m	400 m	Tbh.
	4	Stephanie Rice (AUS)	0.97	29.87; 29.87	1:04.08; 34.21	1:40.42; 36.34	2:15.96; 35.54	2:56.38; 40.42	3:37.41; 41.03	4:10.55; 33.14	4:41.91 (GR); 31.36	
	3	Rebecca Cooke (ENG)	0.83	30.80; 30.80	1:04.90; 34.10	1:41.55; 36.65	2:17.77; 36.22	2:58.72; 40.95	3:40.78; 42.06	4:13.01; 32.23	4:44.60; 31.59	2.69
	5	Jennifer Reilly (AUS)	0.90	31.25; 31.25	1:06.10; 34.85	1:42.59; 36.49	2:17.67; 35.08	2:59.23; 41.56	3:41.16; 41.93	4:15.15; 33.99	4:47.13; 31.98	5.22
4	1	Hannah Miley (SCO)	0.77	32.16; 32.16	1:08.29; 36.13	1:44.61; 36.32	2:20.13; 35.52	3:01.04; 40.91	3:43.35; 42.31	4:16.34; 32.99	4:47.95; 31.61	6.04
5	6	Helen Norfolk (NZL)	0.82	30.74; 30.74	1:05.32; 34.58	1:41.63; 36.31	2:17.36; 35.73	2:59.31; 41.95	3:42.12; 42.81	4:15.16; 33.04	4:48.09; 32.93	6.18
6	2	Keri-Anne Payne (ENG)	0.70	30.77; 30.77	1:05.79; 35.02	1:42.22; 36.43	2:18.04; 35.82	3:01.06; 43.02	3:44.83; 43.77	4:18.54; 33.71	4:51.31; 32.77	9.40
7	7	Julie Gould (WAL)	0.70	32.15; 32.15	1:08.51; 36.36	1:45.49; 36.98	2:21.88; 36.39	3:03.68; 41.80	3:45.71; 42.03	4:19.29; 33.58	4:51.90; 32.61	9.99
8	8	Lorna Smith (SCO)	0.84	32.46; 32.46	1:09.51; 37.05	1:47.09; 37.58	2:23.60; 36.51	3:06.53; 42.93	3:50.53; 44.00	4:26.00; 35.47	5:01.49; 35.49	19.58

== Heats ==
The Women's 400 metres individual medley heats were held at the Melbourne Sports and Aquatic Centre on the 21 March 2006 at 10:38 AEST.

=== Heat 1 ===
Rank	Lane	Swimmer	R.T.	50 m	100 m	150 m	200 m	250 m	300 m	350 m	400 m	Tbh.
1	5	Stephanie Rice (AUS)	0.95	30.47; 30.47	1:04.82; 34.35	1:41.73; 36.91	2:17.99; 36.26	2:59.82; 41.83	3:41.66; 41.84	4:15.68; 34.02	4:47.89 (Q); 32.21	
2	4	Jennifer Reilly (AUS)	0.86	31.07; 31.07	1:06.68; 35.61	1:43.54; 36.86	2:19.23; 35.69	3:00.78; 41.55	3:42.39; 41.61	4:16.82; 34.43	4:47.94 (Q); 31.12	0.05
3	3	Hannah Miley (SCO)	0.76	31.76; 31.76	1:07.46; 35.70	1:44.47; 37.01	2:21.33; 36.86	3:03.40; 42.07	3:46.64; 43.24	4:21.00; 34.36	4:53.55 (Q); 32.55	5.66
4	6	Lorna Smith (SCO)	0.88	32.32; 32.32	1:09.26; 36.94	1:46.17; 36.91	2:22.24; 36.07	3:04.30; 42.06	3:47.38; 43.08	4:21.90; 34.52	4:55.02 (Q); 33.12	7.13
5	2	Katheryn Meaklim (RSA)	0.79	32.17; 32.17	1:08.56; 36.39	1:47.70; 39.14	2:26.09; 38.39	3:07.18; 41.09	3:49.73; 42.55	4:24.59; 34.86	4:58.01; 33.42	10.12
6	7	Ting Wen Quah (SIN)	0.75	31.83; 31.83	1:07.45; 35.62	1:45.53; 38.08	2:22.37; 36.84	3:09.46; 47.09	3:56.36; 46.90	4:31.24; 34.88	5:04.52; 33.28	16.63
7	1	Gail Strobridge (GUE)	0.80	31.82; 31.82	1:08.24; 36.42	1:48.76; 40.52	2:29.25; 40.49	3:12.30; 43.05	3:56.46; 44.16	4:31.86; 35.40	5:05.64; 33.78	17.75

=== Heat 2 ===
Rank	Lane	Swimmer	R.T.	50 m	100 m	150 m	200 m	250 m	300 m	350 m	400 m	Tbh.
1	5	Rebecca Cooke (ENG)	0.84	31.13; 31.13	1:05.49; 34.36	1:42.70; 37.21	2:19.26; 36.56	3:00.80; 41.54	3:43.03; 42.23	4:16.47; 33.44	4:48.99 (Q); 32.52	
2	6	Helen Norfolk (NZL)	0.81	30.84; 30.84	1:05.17; 34.33	1:41.78; 36.61	2:17.58; 35.80	2:59.92; 42.34	3:43.08; 43.16	4:18.05; 34.97	4:51.46 (Q); 33.41	2.47
3	3	Keri-Anne Payne (ENG)	0.69	31.35; 31.35	1:07.13; 35.78	1:43.56; 36.43	2:18.95; 35.39	3:01.70; 42.75	3:45.49; 43.79	4:19.11; 33.62	4:51.77 (Q); 32.66	2.78
4	2	Julie Gould (WAL)	0.69	32.00; 32.00	1:08.76; 36.76	1:45.46; 36.70	2:21.71; 36.25	3:03.86; 42.15	3:46.26; 42.40	4:20.35; 34.09	4:53.23 (Q); 32.88	4.24
5	7	Wendy Trott (RSA)	0.80	31.79; 31.79	1:07.83; 36.04	1:47.14; 39.31	2:25.43; 38.29	3:08.94; 43.51	3:52.54; 43.60	4:26.10; 33.56	4:58.49; 32.39	9.50
6	4	Lara Carroll (AUS)	0.82	32.19; 32.19	1:09.98; 37.79	1:48.36; 38.38	2:26.41; 38.05	3:08.87; 42.46	3:53.87; 45.00	4:30.67; 36.80	5:06.08; 35.41	17.09
7	8	Emily-Claire Crookall-nixon (IOM)	0.75	31.74; 31.74	1:08.58; 36.84	1:49.40; 40.82	2:29.74; 40.34	3:17.31; 47.57	4:05.78; 48.47	4:42.28; 36.50	5:18.11; 35.83	29.12
DNS	1	Olivia Rawlinson (IOM)										
