= Justin Mortimer (swimmer) =

American swimmer

Personal information
- Born: 1982 (age 43–44) Milton, Massachusetts, United States
- Spouse: Hayley McGregory

Sport
- Sport: Swimming
- Club: Mission Viejo Nadadores
- College team: Minnesota Golden Gophers
Medal record
Representing United States
World Championships (SC)
Gold medal – first place	2004 Indianapolis	4x200m freestyle relay
Summer Universiade
Gold medal – first place	2005 Izmir	1500m freestyle
Silver medal – second place	2003 Daegu	400m freestyle
Silver medal – second place	2003 Daegu	4x200m freestyle relay
Silver medal – second place	2005 Izmir	400m freestyle
Bronze medal – third place	2005 Izmir	4x200m freestyle relay

Justin Mortimer (born 1982) is an American former competitive swimmer who specialized in distance freestyle and individual medley events. He is a 2004 World Champion (short course) and a seven-time individual U.S. National Champion. Mortimer twice received the Kiphuth High Point Award, an honor awarded to the highest-scoring male swimmer at the United States National Championships.

== Early life and education ==
Mortimer grew up in Milton, Massachusetts and attended Boston College High School, graduating in 2000. During his high school career, he was a four-time Boston Globe All-Scholastic selection. In 2000, he was named the Boston Globe Male Athlete of the Year after his Massachusetts interscholastic swimming achievements in the freestyle events.

In 2000, at age 18, Mortimer competed in the U.S. Olympic Trials in Indianapolis representing the Mass Bay Marlins. Following his performances that year, he was ranked as a top five U.S. high school swimming recruit in three individual event, with a World Top 10 ranking in the 18 & Under age category. He subsequently enrolled at the University of Minnesota.

== Career ==
=== Collegiate career ===
Mortimer swam for the Minnesota Golden Gophers under coaches Dennis Dale and Kelly Kremer. During his tenure, he earned 13 All-America honors, Academic All-American, and set school records in the 500, 1000, and 1650-yard freestyle and 400-yard individual medley. He was inducted into the University of Minnesota Aquatics Hall of Fame in 2015. In 2003, he represented the United States at the 2003 Summer Universiade in Daegu, winning silver medals in the 400-meter freestyle and the 4x200-meter freestyle relay.

=== 2004–2006: National and international success ===
Mortimer took a hiatus from collegiate competition during the 2003–04 season to train with the Mission Viejo Nadadores under coach Bill Rose. At the 2004 U.S. Olympic Trials in Long Beach, he recorded several top-ten finishes but did not qualify for the Olympic team, finishing third in the 1500-meter freestyle (15:13.66) and fourth in the 400-meter freestyle.

Despite missing the Olympic roster, Mortimer's 2004 season saw him achieve a World Top 10 ranking in the Open (all age) division. Shortly after the trials, at the 2004 U.S. Summer Nationals, he won four individual titles (200m, 800m, 1500m freestyle, and 400m IM) to earn his first Kiphuth High Point Award. Later that year, at the FINA World Championships (25m) in Indianapolis, he won a gold medal in the 4x200-meter freestyle relay and an individual bronze medal in the 400-meter freestyle.

In 2005, at the World University Games in Izmir, he won the gold medal in the 1500-meter freestyle. He concluded his high-level domestic career at the 2006 U.S. Spring Nationals, where he swept the distance freestyle events, received his second Kiphuth High Point Award and seventh National title.

== Personal life ==
Mortimer earned a degree in physics from the University of Minnesota. After retiring from competitive swimming, he married fellow former swimmer and world-record holder Hayley McGregory. The couple reside in Austin, Texas.

== See also ==
- List of University of Minnesota people
- Kiphuth Award
