= Hayley McGregory =

American swimmer

Personal information
- National team: United States
- Born: January 13, 1986 (age 40)
- Height: 6 ft 0 in (183 cm)

Sport
- Sport: Swimming
- Strokes: Backstroke
- College team: University of Texas, University of Southern California

Hayley McGregory (born January 13, 1986) is an American former competitive swimmer. She achieved national and international prominence across age-group, collegiate, and professional levels. A former U.S. Open, American, and World record holder in the 50-meter and 100-meter backstroke events.

== Career ==
=== Age-group and collegiate career ===
McGregory's competitive career began in the late 1990s at the Houston Swim Club. In 1997, at age 10, she was ranked ninth in the United States for the 50-yard backstroke with a time of 31.25.

In 2000, at age 14, McGregory became a naturalized American citizen and became one of the youngest qualifiers for the 2000 United States Olympic Trials in Indianapolis.

In 2001, she was named the Texas High School Female Athlete of the Year after winning state titles in the 100-yard freestyle and 100-yard backstroke. She shared this statewide recognition with future NFL quarterback Vince Young, who was named the Male Athlete of the Year. Two weeks after her high school state titles, McGregory competed in San Antonio for the Speedo Challenge meet, where she swam both the 100-yard and 200-yard backstroke, in times of 54.61 and 1:57.33, respectively. Both times were faster than the listed 13-14 National Age Group records held by North Baltimore's Beth Botsford (54.78-1:57.36), who did those swims during the 1995–96 season, and later won the Olympic gold medal.

While training with Longhorn Aquatics, McGregory established multiple National Age Group (NAG) records. These included the 15–16 girls' 400-meter medley relay (2002) and the 17–18 girls' 400-yard medley relay (2004). Hayley graduated from Bowie High School in Austin, Texas in 2004.

Following high school, she studied at the University of Texas at Austin before transferring to the University of Southern California. Her collegiate career was marked by success at two major programs. At the University of Texas, in 2005, she was a Big 12 Conference in the 100-yard backstroke and All-American. After transferring to the University of Southern California (USC), she set school records in the 100-yard and 100-meter backstroke and earned further All-American honors, including a silver medal sweep in the backstroke events at the 2006 Pac-10 Championships, where she also was a member of the winning 400-yard medley relay.

=== Professional career and world records ===
McGregory won both the 100-meter and 200-meter backstroke titles at the 2004 Summer Nationals. She captured a gold medal in the 400m medley relay at the 2005 World University Games in Izmir, Turkey in August 2005. And was also the 100-meter backstroke champion at the 2007 ConocoPhillips National Championships.

In 2008, McGregory established two world records in backstroke:

- 50-meter backstroke: On March 7, 2008, she set a world record of 28.00 seconds at the All-American Long Course Championships in Austin, Texas. She later lowered the American record in the event to 27.80 on June 7, 2008.
- 100-meter backstroke: During the preliminaries of the 2008 United States Olympic Trials on June 30, she set a world record of 59.15 seconds in Heat 15. Her record was broken in the following heat by Natalie Coughlin, who clocked 59.03 seconds.
  - Hayley McGregory 100m Backstroke World Record Heat.

=== Olympic heartbreak and beyond ===
McGregory is perhaps best known for her performances at the U.S. Olympic Trials, where in 2008, she set a world record of 59.15 in the 100-meter backstroke during the preliminaries. Despite her record-breaking speed, she famously finished third in both the 100-meter and 200-meter backstroke events at the 2004 and 2008 Trials, narrowly missing Olympic qualification.

Later in 2008, she set two U.S. Open Championship records. In the 200-meter backstroke, she set the record at 2:08.42, which became the oldest record on the books until it was broken by Stanford freshman Regan Smith in 2021. At the same meet, she also went 59.11 seconds in the 100-meter backstroke, a mark that stood until 2013.

She represented the United States at the 2009 World Aquatics Championships in Rome, where she reached the finals of the 100-meter backstroke and recorded a 27.83 in the 50-meter backstroke semifinals. Her final international competition was the 2009 Mutual of Omaha Duel in the Pool held in Manchester, England.

=== Personal life ===
Following her retirement from competitive swimming, McGregory became a USA Swimming age group development coach in Austin, Texas, a role she has held since 2010. She is married to fellow former competitive swimmer Justin Mortimer.

== Personal bests ==
=== Long course (50 m pool) ===
Event	Time	Venue	Date	Notes
50 m Back	27.80	Austin, Texas	June 7, 2008	Former American record
100 m Back	59.11	Minneapolis, Minnesota	August 1, 2008	Former U.S. Open record
200 m Back	2:07.69	Omaha, Nebraska	July 5, 2008	

== See also ==
- List of University of Texas at Austin alumni
- World record progression 50 metres backstroke
- World record progression 100 metres backstroke

Records
Preceded by Li Yang	Women's 50-meter backstroke world record-holder (long course); March 7, 2008 – March 22, 2008	Succeeded by Emily Seebohm
Preceded by Natalie Coughlin	Women's 100-meter backstroke world record-holder (long course); June 30, 2008 – June 30, 2008	Succeeded by Natalie Coughlin
