= Katie Hoff =

American swimmer

Katie Hoff OLY
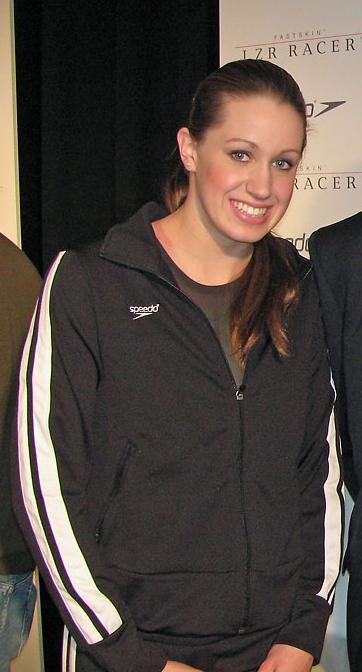
- Hoff in 2008

Personal information
- Full name: Kathryn Elise Hoff
- National team: United States
- Born: June 3, 1989 (age 37) Palo Alto, California, U.S.
- Height: 5 ft 9 in (1.75 m)
- Weight: 141 lb (64 kg)

Sport
- Sport: Swimming
- Strokes: Freestyle, individual medley
- Club: North Baltimore Aquatic Club, FAST Aquatics, T2 Aquatics
Medal record
Women's swimming
Representing the United States
| Event | 1st | 2nd | 3rd |
|---|---|---|---|
| Olympic Games | 0 | 1 | 2 |
| World Championships (LC) | 7 | 0 | 0 |
| World Championships (SC) | 1 | 3 | 1 |
| Pan Pacific Championships | 4 | 2 | 0 |
| Total | 12 | 6 | 3 |
Olympic Games
| Silver medal – second place | 2008 Beijing | 400 m freestyle |
| Bronze medal – third place | 2008 Beijing | 400 m medley |
| Bronze medal – third place | 2008 Beijing | 4×200 m freestyle |
World Championships (LC)
| Gold medal – first place | 2005 Montreal | 200 m medley |
| Gold medal – first place | 2005 Montreal | 400 m medley |
| Gold medal – first place | 2005 Montreal | 4×200 m freestyle |
| Gold medal – first place | 2007 Melbourne | 200 m medley |
| Gold medal – first place | 2007 Melbourne | 400 m medley |
| Gold medal – first place | 2007 Melbourne | 4×200 m freestyle |
| Gold medal – first place | 2011 Shanghai | 4×200 m freestyle |
World Championships (SC)
| Gold medal – first place | 2010 Dubai | 400 m freestyle |
| Silver medal – second place | 2004 Indianapolis | 400 m medley |
| Silver medal – second place | 2010 Dubai | 200 m freestyle |
| Silver medal – second place | 2010 Dubai | 4×100 m freestyle |
| Bronze medal – third place | 2004 Indianapolis | 200 m medley |
Pan Pacific Championships
| Gold medal – first place | 2006 Victoria | 200 m freestyle |
| Gold medal – first place | 2006 Victoria | 400 m medley |
| Gold medal – first place | 2006 Victoria | 4×200 m freestyle |
| Gold medal – first place | 2010 Irvine | 4×200 m freestyle |
| Silver medal – second place | 2006 Victoria | 400 m freestyle |
| Silver medal – second place | 2006 Victoria | 200 m medley |

Kathryn Elise Hoff (born June 3, 1989) is an American former competitive swimmer, Olympic medalist, and former world record-holder. Hoff was known for the 200-meter and 400-meter individual medley events. She represented the United States at the 2004 Summer Olympics and 2008 Summer Olympics, where she won a silver medal and two bronze medals.

== Competitive career ==
=== 2004–2005 ===
Hoff qualified for the 2004 Summer Olympics at the age of 15.

At the 2005 World Aquatics Championships, Hoff set a championships record for her time of 2:10.41 in the women's 200-meter individual medley. Hoff earned two more gold medals at the competition, one in the 400-meter medley and the other for the 4×200-meter freestyle, with teammates Natalie Coughlin, Whitney Myers, and Kaitlin Sandeno.

=== 2006 ===
In early 2006, Hoff made news by signing a 10-year endorsement deal with Speedo, which was the longest deal Speedo had with any athlete at the time. As a result, Hoff forfeited her amateur status for purposes of NCAA rules; however, one of the terms of the deal included a clause that Speedo would pay the cost of her college tuition.

=== 2007 World Aquatics Championships ===
Hoff retained her 200-meter individual medley title by winning at the 2007 World Championships setting a new championship record of 2:10.13. Hoff's previous experience helped her use her "veteran" status to help the most experienced member of the U.S. team, Natalie Coughlin, prepare for their world-record-setting pace in the 4×200-meter freestyle relay.

=== 2008 Summer Olympics ===
Heading into the 2008 Olympics, Hoff was considered a strong contender. Hoff held the American record in the 200-meter individual medley at 2:09.71 and set the world record in the 400-meter individual medley with a time of 4:31.12 set at the 2008 U.S. swim trials. (This time was subsequently bettered by Stephanie Rice in the Olympic finals with a time of 4:29.45).

Hoff's performances in Beijing produced a decidedly mixed record. NBC commentator and former-Olympian Rowdy Gaines described her results as disappointing (this included finishing second to Great Britain's Rebecca Adlington in the 400-meter freestyle), yet noted that her three medals at one Olympics is a significant achievement and cited the depth of the field in each of her events. Prior to the Olympic Games, Hoff was saddled by the media with the label "the female Michael Phelps" due to the challenging slate of races in which she was competing. Bob Bowman, Phelps' coach, thought the comparison was unfair.

Hoff set the American record in the 200-meter freestyle, yet finished fourth in the event. 70 minutes later, in the finals of the 200-meter individual medley, Hoff again finished fourth, well behind her time at the U.S. swim trials. These results led to questions as to whether Hoff's program in Beijing was too aggressive. It was also suggested that Hoff's narrow miss of a gold medal in the 400-meter freestyle created a confidence issue that affected her later races.

Following her consecutive fourth-place finishes, Hoff's coach, Paul Yetter, held that she was having a good meet and denied she had peaked too early. Yetter also predicted that Hoff could have an "awesome" 800-meter freestyle race to conclude her second Olympic games. However, Hoff dramatically faded over the second half of her preliminary race, finishing in 8:27.78, 8.08 seconds off her personal best time, and failed to advance.

=== 2009 ===
Hoff's plan for 2009 had been to train at Loyola College in Maryland, where it was reported she would enroll in classes and volunteer as an assistant swim coach, similar to what Michael Phelps had done at the University of Michigan. However, ESPN reported that she would instead remain at NBAC and switch coaches to work with Bob Bowman, who had announced in April 2008 that he was leaving Michigan's program after the Olympic trials. Bowman's coaching style did not mesh well with Hoff, and her time working with him ended in May 2009, when she came close to quitting the sport.

Hoff did not qualify for the 2009 World Aquatics Championships after an 8th-place finish in the 200-meter freestyle and a 6th-place finish in the 400-meter freestyle at the U.S. National Championships. Hoff subsequently withdrew from the 100- and 800-meter freestyle races, ending her chances of making the team.

=== 2010 ===
Hoff relocated to California, where she began training and competing with the Fullerton Aquatics Sports Team (FAST) and coach Sean Hutchison. She began to return to form, and at the 2010 USA Swimming Championships, she won a gold and 2 bronze medals.

=== 2011 World Aquatics Championships ===
At the 2011 World Aquatics Championships in Shanghai, China, Hoff won a gold medal in the 4×200-meter freestyle relay with Missy Franklin, Dagny Knutson, and Allison Schmitt, with the team finishing ahead of Australia and China. As the third leg, Hoff had a 1:57.41 split.

=== 2012 ===
Hoff moved to Naples, Florida to train with T2 Aquatics under her former coach Paul Yetter, who had moved there from NBAC in 2010.

At the 2012 Olympic Trials, Hoff failed to qualify for her third Olympics, finishing 20th in the preliminary runs in the 200-meter and 400-meter freestyle and 13th in the 800-meter freestyle.

=== 2013 ===
Beginning in 2013, Hoff took a brief hiatus from competitive swimming focus on her studies, enrolling at the University of Miami as a full-time student. However, she began training with Hurricane Aquatics club team (as a professional, she could not swim in the NCAA) at the University of Miami shortly after arriving there. Hoff competed in her first meet since the 2012 Olympic Trials on November 23–24.

=== 2014 ===
In April 2014, Hoff made a comeback at the Mesa Arena Pro Series. At Nationals in Irvine, California, she was forced to withdraw due to health problems. In October it was found that she had blood clots in her lungs, which took her several months to recover from.

=== 2015 ===
On December 14, 2015, Hoff officially announced her retirement from swimming due to continuing health issues related to scar tissue from blood clots in her lungs.

== Personal life ==
Hoff was born in Palo Alto, California and lived for a number of years in Williamsburg, Virginia, where she swam as a youngster with the Williamsburg Aquatic Club, coached by Harold Baker. She also swam summer neighborhood meets with the Windsor Forest Frogs, where several of her team records, circa 2000 and 2001 still stand. She moved with her family to Towson, Maryland in 2003, in part so she could practice with the North Baltimore Aquatic Club, also the home team of Michael Phelps. In 2008, she purchased a condominium in the Mount Washington neighborhood of Baltimore. Her mother, Jeanne Ruark Hoff, played basketball for Stanford University from 1979 to 1983. Hoff's father, John, is a salesman. Both Hoff and her younger brother, Christian, were home schooled. She is married to former Michigan State football player Todd Anderson. In December 2015, she announced her retirement from swimming.

== Major achievements ==
=== International events ===
| Year | Meet | Venue | Distance | Event | Result |
|---|---|---|---|---|---|
| 2004 | Olympic Games | Athens, Greece | 200 m | Individual medley | 7th |
| 2004 | Olympics Games | Athens, Greece | 400 m | Individual medley | 17th |
| 2005 | World Championships | Montreal, Canada | 200 m | Freestyle | 9th |
| 2005 | World Championships | Montreal, Canana | 200 m | Individual medley | 1st |
| 2005 | World Championships | Montreal, Canana | 400 m | Individual medley | 1st |
| 2005 | World Championships | Montreal, Canana | 4 × 200 m | Freestyle relay | 1st |
| 2006 | Pan Pacific Championships | Victoria, Canada | 200 m | Freestyle | 1st |
| 2006 | Pan Pacific Championships | Victoria, Canada | 400 m | Freestyle | 2nd |
| 2006 | Pan Pacific Championships | Victoria, Canada | 200 m | Individual medley | 2nd |
| 2006 | Pan Pacific Championships | Victoria, Canada | 400 m | Individual medley | 1st |
| 2006 | Pan Pacific Championships | Victoria, Canada | 4 × 200 m | Freestyle relay | 1st |
| 2007 | World Championships | Melbourne, Australia | 200 m | Freestyle | 4th |
| 2007 | World Championships | Melbourne, Australia | 400 m | Freestyle | 4th |
| 2007 | World Championships | Melbourne, Australia | 200 m | Individual medley | 1st |
| 2007 | World Championships | Melbourne, Australia | 400 m | Individual medley | 1st WR |
| 2007 | World Championships | Melbourne, Australia | 4 × 200 m | Freestyle relay | 1st WR |
| 2008 | Olympic Games | Beijing, China | 200 m | Freestyle | 4th |
| 2008 | Olympic Games | Beijing, China | 400 m | Freestyle | 2nd |
| 2008 | Olympic Games | Beijing, China | 800 m | Freestyle | 11th |
| 2008 | Olympic Games | Beijing, China | 200 m | Individual medley | 4th |
| 2008 | Olympic Games | Beijing, China | 400 m | Individual medley | 3rd |
| 2008 | Olympic Games | Beijing, China | 4 × 200 m | Freestyle relay | 3rd |
| 2010 | Pan Pacific Championships | Irvine, United States | 4 × 200 m | Freestyle relay | 1st |
| 2011 | World Championships | Shanghai, China | 400 m | Freestyle | 7th |
| 2011 | World Championships | Shanghai, China | 4 × 200 m | Freestyle relay | 1st |

=== U.S. National Achievements ===
| Year | Meet | Distance | Event | Result |
|---|---|---|---|---|
| 2003 | US Open | 200 m | Individual medley | 2nd |
| 2003 | US Open | 400 m | Individual medley | 2nd |
| 2004 | Spring Nationals | 200 m | Individual medley | 3rd |
| 2004 | Spring Nationals | 400 m | Individual medley | 1st |
| 2005 | US Open | 200 m | Freestyle | 1st |
| 2005 | US Open | 100 m | Butterfly | 1st |
| 2005 | US Open | 200 m | Butterfly | 1st |
| 2005 | US Open | 200 m | Individual medley | 1st |
| 2006 | US Open | 800 m | Freestyle | 1st |
| 2006 | US Open | 200 m | Individual medley | 1st |
| 2006 | US Open | 400 m | Individual medley | 1st |
| 2006 | Summer Nationals | 200 m | Freestyle | 2nd |
| 2006 | Summer Nationals | 400 m | Freestyle | 2nd |
| 2006 | Summer Nationals | 200 m | Individual medley | 1st |
| 2006 | Summer Nationals | 400 m | Individual medley | 1st |
| 2006 | Spring Championships | 50 m | Freestyle | 3rd |
| 2006 | Spring Championships | 100 m | Freestyle | 1st |
| 2006 | Spring Championships | 400 m | Freestyle | 1st |
| 2006 | Spring Championships | 200 m | Butterfly | 2nd |
| 2006 | Spring Championships | 200 m | Individual medley | 1st |
| 2006 | Spring Championships | 400 m | Individual medley | 1st |

== See also ==
- List of Olympic medalists in swimming (women)
- List of World Aquatics Championships medalists in swimming (women)
- World record progression 400 metres individual medley
- World record progression 4 × 200 metres freestyle relay

== Bibliography ==
- Hoff, Katie with Richard Bader. Blueprint: An Olympian's Story of Striving, Adapting, and Embracing the Suck. United States, CG Sports Publishing, October 23, 2020. ISBN 978-1-7359193-0-0.

Records
| Preceded by Yana Klochkova | Women's 400-meter individual medley world record-holder (long course); April 1, 2007 – March 22, 2008 | Succeeded by Stephanie Rice |
| Preceded by Stephanie Rice | Women's 400-meter individual medley world record-holder (long course); June 29, 2008 – August 10, 2008 | Succeeded by Stephanie Rice |
Awards
| Preceded by Amanda Beard | Swimming World; American Swimmer of the Year; 2005–2007 | Succeeded by Natalie Coughlin |
