= Kingdomcity =

Global Pentecostal Christian church

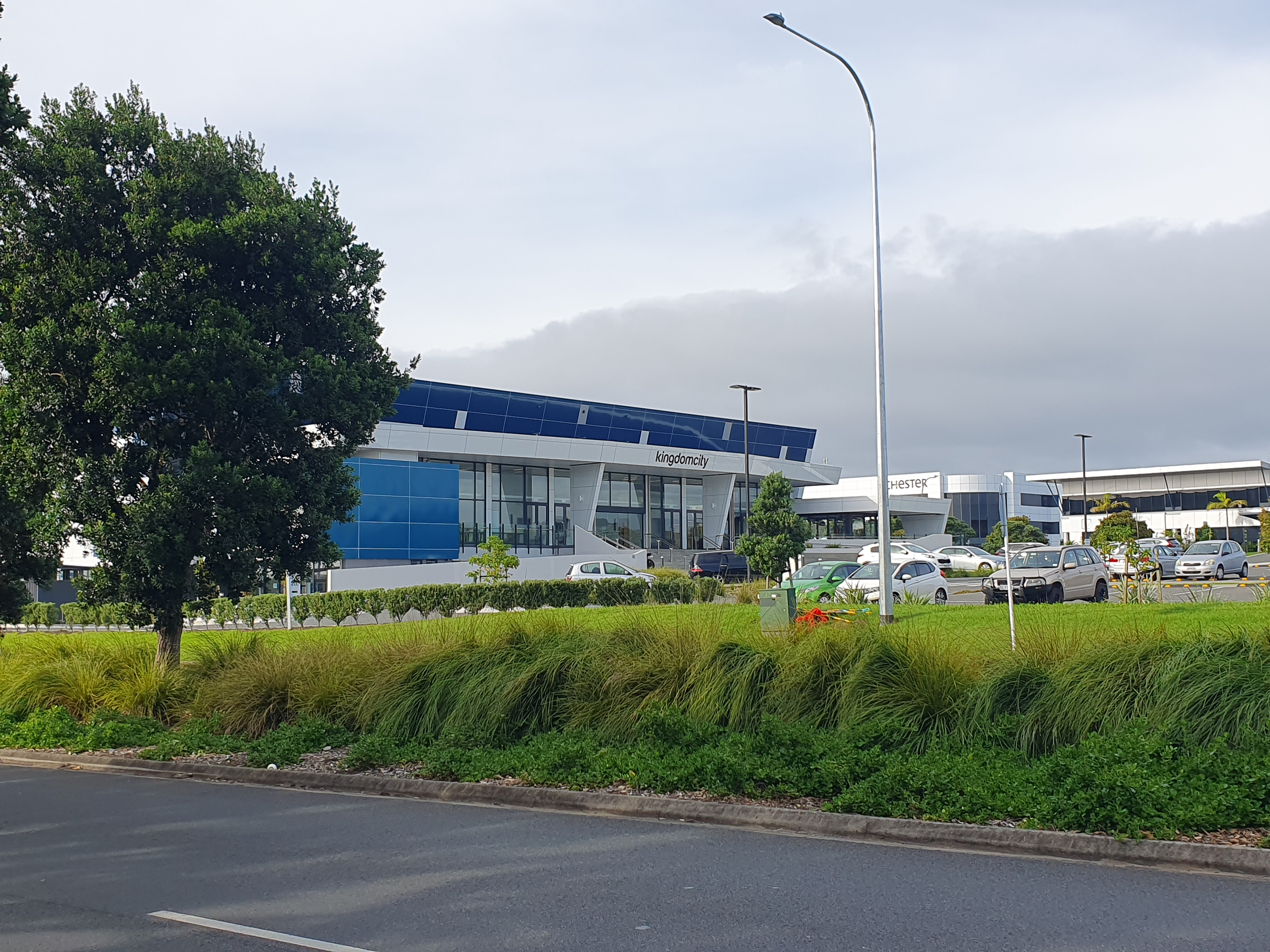
- Kingdomcity Auckland in New Zealand
- Location: Kuala Lumpur, Malaysia
- Country: Malaysia, Australia, Cambodia, Singapore, Botswana, United Arab Emirates, United Kingdom, Indonesia, Zambia, Sri Lanka, India, South Africa, New Zealand, Mexico, Hong Kong, Brazil, United States, Burundi, Democratic Republic of the Congo, Tanzania, Belgium, Spain
- Denomination: Pentecostal
- Website: kingdomcity.com

History
- Founded: April 2006

Kingdomcity is a Pentecostal multi-site church with 44 locations in 30 countries. Originally based in Kuala Lumpur, Malaysia, before it expanded to Perth in Western Australia, Kingdomcity now also has multiple locations across Africa, Asia, Europe, North and South America, and Oceania. As of May 2026, the church has reported a global weekly attendance of 70,000 people. It was founded by Mark Varughese.

== History ==
In 2006, Mark Varughese had a profound "burning-bush experience" which led to his move from Perth, Western Australia, to Kuala Lumpur, Malaysia, to plant a church.

After two and a half years in Malaysia, he received an invitation to return to Perth to pastor Lakes church concurrently taking over from pastor Neil Smith. This move led to the birth of Kingdomcity – with both congregations unified under one name. This was a declaration of their mandate, and a representation of the responsibility of every believer, to bring God's kingdom to every city.

Following the unification of the Malaysian and Australian congregations, Kingdomcity embarked on a period of rapid international growth, primarily within the Asia Pacific and African regions. Beginning in 2014, the church expanded to Cambodia, followed by Singapore in 2015. The expansion continued into Africa with a presence in Botswana in 2016 and Zambia in 2019. The church also established locations in the Middle East (Dubai, 2017), Europe (London, 2018), and other Asian nations, including Indonesia (Bali and Surabaya, 2019) and Sri Lanka (2019). By 2021, the movement reported a weekly attendance of 30,000 people across its various locations and launched its first church in New Zealand (Auckland). A digital expansion also occurred in 2020 with the launch of the global Online Campus, allowing it to reach hundreds of cities worldwide.

In addition to its multi-site church growth, Kingdomcity diversified its ministry to include several related organizations. The church founded Kingdomcity Communications Ltd, a media-based communications company that produces digital content, including the church's original music and an accelerated discipleship program called Greenhouse. Furthermore, in 2023, Senior Associate Leader Jemima Varughese pioneered and launched the Kingdomcity School, an international Christian-based online school offering an accredited curriculum for students from years K-12 globally.

== Music ==
Kingdomcity produce contemporary Christian music for praise and worship.

Kingdomcity Worship has released 6 studio albums:

- Place of Worship (2020)
- In God We Trust (2021)
- Hope Is Here (2021)
- My Gift Back To You (2023)
- Holy x Infinity (2024)
- Take Me Back (2026)

Saints and Warriors is the next generation band of Kingdomcity and has become the young worship movement of Kingdomcity. The team exists to reach the generations through powerful and various styles of praise and worship. The band has released many albums and singles, all starting from their first single Undignified released in 2022.

Kingdomcity Kids have their own original songs too, aiming to provide music for the whole family.

== See also ==
- Christianity in Malaysia
