= Kristen Caverly =

American swimmer (born 1984)

Personal information
- Full name: Kristen Joanne Caverly
- National team: United States
- Born: September 20, 1984 (age 41) San Clemente, California, United States
- Height: 5 ft 10 in (1.78 m)
- Weight: 139 lb (63 kg)

Sport
- Sport: Swimming
- Strokes: Backstroke, breaststroke, individual medley
- Club: Irvine NovAquatics; Irvine Aquazots (1999-01); Nellie Gail (2001-2002)
- College team: Stanford University (2006)
- Coach: John Badaruk (San Clemente High); Richard Quick (Stanford)
Medal record
Women's swimming
Representing the United States
Pan American Games
Silver medal – second place	2003 Santo Domingo	400m medley

Kristen Joanne Caverly (born September 20, 1984) is an American former competitive swimmer and model who swam for Stanford University and represented the United States at the 2004 Summer Olympics.

Caverly was born September 20, 1984 in San Clemente, California. Beginning to swim at only eight, she soon bested existing age group records as part of San Clemente Aquatics. In later club competition, she swam with the Irvine Aquazots under Brian Pajer from 1999-2001, and had formerly swam with the Irvine NovAquatics. Swimming with the Irvine NovAquatics in March 1996, she placed first in the 100-yard breaststroke with a short course time of 1:08.64 at the Southern California Junior Olympics. She swam with the Nellie Gail Gators under Coach Louis Demitriades from 2001-02. She attended San Clemente High School graduating in 2002, where she trained under John Bardaruk. At San Clemente High, as an outstanding swim team member, she established a new National High School Record in the 200 Individual Medley and a California State Record in the 100 breaststroke in 2001.

== Stanford University ==
Caverly attended Stanford University, majoring in Psychology, graduating with the class of 2006. At Stanford, where she trained and competed for most of her swimming tenure under Hall of Fame Coach Richard Quick, she was an All American, and Pac-10 champion. She was a national champion three times. As a Stanford Senior, she was a 4-Time All-American and Pac-10 Champion. As a finalist in the NCAA Championships in her Senior year, she placed third in the 400 IM, fifth in the 200 Breaststroke, 6th in the 200 IM, 6th in the 400 Medley Relay, and 9th in the 200 Medley Relay. A talented scholar, she received honorable mention as a Pac-10 All-Academic. While at Stanford, she had an all time ranking for Stanford swimmers for short course yards taking a fourth place with a of 2:11.13, in the 200 breaststroke, and a fourth place as well in the 400 IM with a 4:10.37.

== 2004 Athens Olympics ==
At the July, 2004 Olympic trials in Long Beach, California Caverly did not quite perform to expectations in her best events. As a nineteen-year old Stanford swimmer, she finished third in the 400 IM with a 4:42.57, and fourth in the 200 breaststroke and 200 IM. Though not her best event, she performed above expectations, after reluctantly entering the 200 backstroke trial, and placed second with a time of 2:12.70, making the U.S. women's team.

After travelling to Athens with the U.S. women's team, though not making the final eight, she placed seventeenth overall in the 200-meter backstroke with a time of 2:15.34, placing her about six seconds out of contending for the bronze medal. Kirsty Coventry of Zimbabwe took the gold medal with a time of 2:09.19, with Stanislava Komorova of Russia taking the silver and Reiko Nakamura and Antje Buschshulte of Germany tieing for the bronze with a time of 2:09.88.

Caverly won a silver medal on the international stage at the 2003 Pan American Games in the 400-meter individual medley. Caverly competed in the 200m Breaststroke at the 2005 FINA World Championships and placed sixth in the final.

She competed for the US National Junior team in Barcelona in 1997. She also participated in the 2001 Goodwill Games in Australia, the 2003 Pan American Games in Santo Domingo, the 2004 Olympics in Athens, the 2005 World Championships in Moscow, and the 2006 Pan Pacific Games in Vitoria.

In 2015, she was living in Brazil with her husband and a daughter.

== Honors ==
Caverly was inducted into the San Clemente Hall of Fame in 2015.

== See also ==
- List of Stanford University people
