= Alexa Komarnycky =

Canadian swimmer (born 1989)

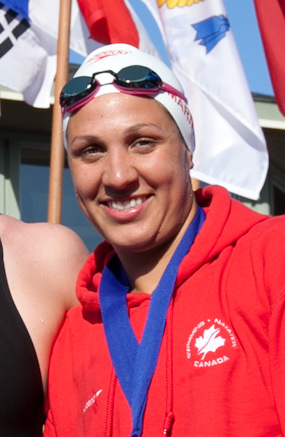

Personal information
- Full name: Alexandra Komarnycky
- Nickname: "Alexa"
- National team: Canada
- Born: October 5, 1989 (age 36) Toronto, Ontario, Canada
- Height: 1.80 m (5 ft 11 in)
- Weight: 68 kg (150 lb)

Sport
- Sport: Swimming
- Strokes: Freestyle
- Club: Etobicoke Swim Club

Alexandra Komarnycky (born October 5, 1989) is a Canadian competitive swimmer. At the 2008 Olympics, she competed in the women's 400 m individual medley, finishing in 29th place. At the 2012 Summer Olympics, she competed in the women's 800-metre freestyle, finishing in 11th place overall in the heats, but failing to qualify for the event final.
