= Whitney Myers =

American former competition swimmer (born 1984)

Personal information
- Full name: Whitney Myers Burnett
- National team: United States
- Born: Whitney Myers; September 8, 1984 (age 41) Oxford, Ohio, U.S.
- Height: 5 ft 5 in (165 cm)
- Spouse: Simon Burnett (2011–present)

Sport
- Sport: Swimming
- Strokes: Medley, butterfly, freestyle
- Club: FAST Swim Team
- College team: University of Arizona
Medal record
Women's swimming
Representing the United States
World Championships (LC)
Gold medal – first place	2005 Montreal	4x200 m freestyle
Pan Pacific Championships
Gold medal – first place	2006 Victoria	200 m medley

Whitney Myers Burnett (born September 8, 1984) is an American former competition swimmer. She swam for the University of Arizona. She won a gold medal at the 2006 Pan-Pacific championships in Victoria, British Columbia, in the 200-meter individual medley, just out-touching teammate Katie Hoff.

She was featured on the cover of the March 2007 issue of Swimming World Magazine.

She swam for Ursuline Academy in Cincinnati, Ohio, for her high school career

"Whitney Myers, a record-setting swimmer and diver at the University of Arizona, was named the NCAA Woman of the Year. The award recognizes outstanding female student-athletes who have excelled in athletics, academics, leadership and service. Myers was selected from 128 nominees representing all three NCAA divisions. Myers is a 14-time record-holder at Arizona, earning her the 2006 Pac-10 Swimmer of the Year award. She was the 2007 NCAA Champion in the 200 individual medley (1:54.89), and tallied a total of six first team All-American honors at the championships. Myers has been on the dean’s list every semester and volunteers with local Girl Scout troops and in elementary schools."-University of Arizona (2007)

== See also ==
- List of World Aquatics Championships medalists in swimming (women)
