= Swimming at the 2012 Summer Olympics =

Coordinates: 51.5402°N 0.0106°W

Swimming at the Games of the XXX Olympiad
- Venue: Aquatics Centre
- Dates: 28 July – 4 August 2012
- Competitors: 900 from 166 nations

The swimming competitions at the 2012 Summer Olympics in London took place from 28 July to 4 August at the Aquatics Centre. The open-water competition took place from 9 to 10 August in Hyde Park.

Swimming featured 32 events (16 male, 16 female), contested in a 50 m long course pool within the Olympic Park.

The United States claimed a total of 30 medals (16 golds, 8 silver, and 6 bronze) in the leaderboard to maintain its supremacy as the most successful nation in swimming. Brought by an unprecedented sporting domination, Michael Phelps emerged as the most decorated Olympian of all time after winning six more medals at these Games to bring his total after the 2012 games to 22 (18 golds, 2 silver, and 2 bronze). Battling against the Americans for an overall medal count, China mounted to an unexpected second-place effort on the leaderboard with a tally of 10 medals (five golds, three silver, and bronze) after striking a superb double from Sun Yang in long-distance freestyle (both 400 and 1500 m) and Ye Shiwen in the individual medley (both 200 and 400 m). Meanwhile, France ended on a spectacular fashion in third spot with a total of seven medals (four golds, two silver, and one bronze), followed by the Netherlands with four, including two golds from Ranomi Kromowidjojo in sprint freestyle (both 50 and 100 m), and South Africa with three.

For the first time since 1992, Australia delivered an underwhelming performance with only a single triumph in the freestyle relay, but managed to bring home a total of ten medals. After not winning a gold in swimming since 2000, Japan produced the most medals in the post-war era to build a tally of eleven (three silver and eight bronze).

A total of nine world records and twenty five Olympic records were set during the competition.

== Events ==
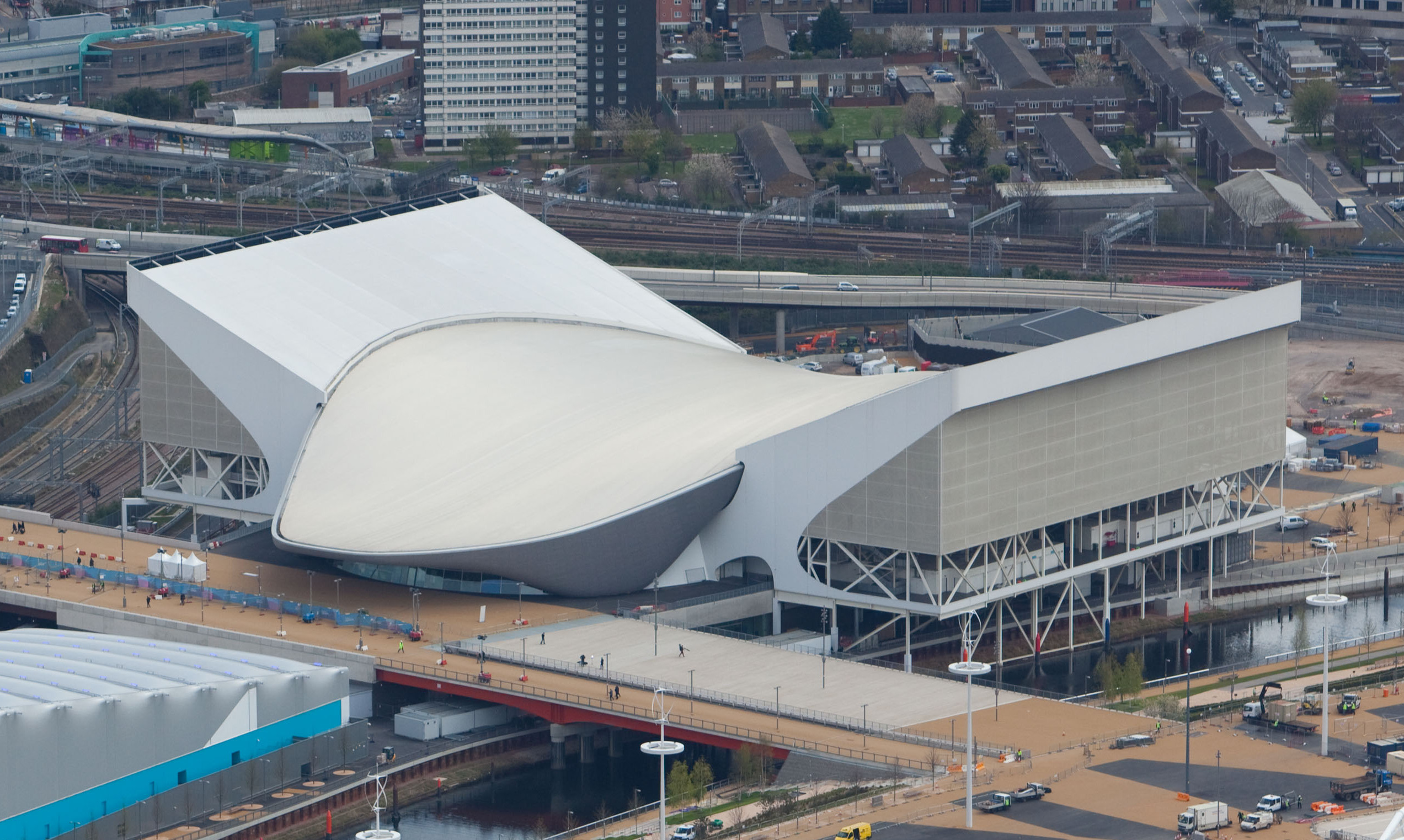
The London Aquatics Centre, designed by famed architect Zaha Hadid, hosted the swimming events during the 2012 Summer Olympics.

Similar to the program's format in 2008, swimming featured a total of 32 events (16 each for men and women). The following events were contested (all pool events were long course, and distances are in metres unless stated):

- Freestyle: 50, 100, 200, 400, 800 (women), and 1500 (men);
- Backstroke: 100 and 200;
- Breaststroke: 100 and 200;
- Butterfly: 100 and 200;
- Individual medley: 200 and 400;
- Relays: 4 × 100 free, 4 × 200 free; 4 × 100 medley

=== Schedule ===
Similar to the previous Olympics since 2000, with the exception of 2008, swimming program schedule occurred in two segments. The prelims were held in the morning, with semifinals and final in the following evening session.

Legend
H	Heats	½	Semi-finals	F	Final

Men
Date →	28 Jul		29 Jul		30 Jul		31 Jul		1 Aug		2 Aug		3 Aug		4 Aug	
Event ↓	M	E	M	E	M	E	M	E	M	E	M	E	M	E	M	E
50 m freestyle											H	½		F		
100 m freestyle							H	½		F						
200 m freestyle			H	½		F										
400 m freestyle	H	F														
1500 m freestyle													H			F
100 m backstroke			H	½		F										
200 m backstroke									H	½		F				
100 m breaststroke	H	½		F												
200 m breaststroke							H	½		F						
100 m butterfly											H	½		F		
200 m butterfly					H	½		F								
200 m individual medley									H	½		F				
400 m individual medley	H	F														
4 × 100 m freestyle relay			H	F												
4 × 200 m freestyle relay							H	F								
4 × 100 m medley relay													H			F

Women
Date →	28 Jul		29 Jul		30 Jul		31 Jul		1 Aug		2 Aug		3 Aug		4 Aug	
Event ↓	M	E	M	E	M	E	M	E	M	E	M	E	M	E	M	E
50 m freestyle													H	½		F
100 m freestyle									H	½		F				
200 m freestyle					H	½		F								
400 m freestyle			H	F												
800 m freestyle											H			F		
100 m backstroke			H	½		F										
200 m backstroke											H	½		F		
100 m breaststroke			H	½		F										
200 m breaststroke									H	½		F				
100 m butterfly	H	½		F												
200 m butterfly							H	½		F						
200 m individual medley					H	½		F								
400 m individual medley	H	F														
4 × 100 m freestyle relay	H	F														
4 × 200 m freestyle relay									H	F						
4 × 100 m medley relay													H			F

== Qualification ==
FINA By-Law BL 9.3.6.4 lays out the qualification procedures for the "Swimming" competition at the Olympics. Each country is allowed to enter up to two swimmers per individual event (provided they qualify), and one entry per relay; and a country may not have more than 26 males and 26 females (52 total) on its team.

=== Individual events ===
On 11 November 2010, FINA posted the qualifying times for individual events for the 2012 Olympics. The time standards consist of two time standards, an "Olympic Qualifying Time" and an "Olympic invitation time". Each country was able to enter up to two swimmers per event, provided both swimmers met the (faster) qualifying time. A country was able to enter one swimmer per event that met the invitation standard. Any swimmer who met the "qualifying" time was entered in the event for the Games; a swimmer meeting the "invitation" standard was eligible for entry, and their entry was allotted/filled in by ranking.

If a country has no swimmers meeting either qualifying standard, it may enter one male and one female. A country that does not receive an allocation spot but has at least one swimmer who meets a qualifying standard may enter the swimmer with the highest ranking.

=== Relay events ===
Each relay event featured 16 teams, composed of:

- 12: the top-12 finishers at the 2011 World Championships in each relay event.
- 4: the 4 fastest non-qualified teams, based on times in the 15-months preceding the Olympics.

== Participating nations ==
FINA announced in early July 2012 that 631 athletes from 166 nations would compete in swimming events at the 2012 Olympics. 59 nations qualified via the A cut (OQT), 12 via the B cut (OST) and 95 via Universality. Brunei, Central African Republic, Djibouti, Ethiopia, Lesotho, Liechtenstein, Togo, and Tonga made their official debut in swimming. Meanwhile, Grenada, Iraq, and Saint Vincent and the Grenadines returned to the sport after an eight-year absence. Nations with swimmers at the Games are (team size in parentheses):

- Albania (2)
- Algeria (1)
- American Samoa (2)
- Andorra (2)
- Angola (2)
- Antigua and Barbuda (2)
- Argentina (4)
- Armenia (2)
- Aruba (2)
- Australia (45)
- Austria (11)
- Azerbaijan (2)
- Bahamas (1)
- Bahrain (2)
- Bangladesh (1)
- Barbados (1)
- Belarus (8)
- Belgium (12)
- Benin (1)
- Bermuda (1)
- Bolivia (2)
- Bosnia and Herzegovina (2)
- Brazil (18)
- Brunei (1)
- Bulgaria (3)
- Burkina Faso (2)
- Burundi (2)
- Cambodia (2)
- Cameroon (2)
- Canada (31)
- Cayman Islands (2)
- Central African Republic (1)
- Chile (1)
- China (50)
- Colombia (3)
- Comoros (1)
- Republic of the Congo (2)
- Cook Islands (2)
- Costa Rica (2)
- Ivory Coast (2)
- Croatia (3)
- Cuba (2)
- Cyprus (1)
- Czech Republic (5)
- Denmark (10)
- Djibouti (1)
- Dominican Republic (2)
- Ecuador (2)
- Egypt (2)
- El Salvador (2)
- Estonia (2)
- Ethiopia (2)
- Fiji (2)
- Finland (7)
- France (29)
- Georgia (1)
- Germany (27)
- Great Britain (43)
- Greece (12)
- Grenada (1)
- Guam (2)
- Guatemala (1)
- Guinea (1)
- Guyana (2)
- Honduras (2)
- Hong Kong (3)
- Hungary (31)
- Iceland (7)
- India (1)
- Indonesia (1)
- Iran (1)
- Iraq (1)
- Ireland (4)
- Israel (5)
- Italy (33)
- Jamaica (1)
- Japan (27)
- Jordan (2)
- Kazakhstan (3)
- Kenya (2)
- South Korea (15)
- Kuwait (2)
- Kyrgyzstan (2)
- Laos (1)
- Latvia (2)
- Lebanon (2)
- Lesotho (1)
- Libya (1)
- Liechtenstein (1)
- Lithuania (4)
- Luxembourg (1)
- Macedonia (2)
- Madagascar (2)
- Malawi (1)
- Malaysia (1)
- Maldives (2)
- Mali (2)
- Malta (2)
- Mauritius (2)
- Marshall Islands (2)
- Mexico (8)
- Federated States of Micronesia (2)
- Moldova (2)
- Monaco (1)
- Mongolia (2)
- Morocco (1)
- Mozambique (2)
- Nepal (2)
- Netherlands (15)
- New Zealand (17)
- Nicaragua (2)
- Niger (1)
- Norway (3)
- Pakistan (2)
- Palau (1)
- Palestine (2)
- Panama (1)
- Papua New Guinea (2)
- Paraguay (2)
- Peru (3)
- Philippines (2)
- Poland (18)
- Portugal (7)
- Puerto Rico (2)
- Qatar (2)
- Romania (4)
- Russia (32)
- Rwanda (2)
- Saint Lucia (1)
- Saint Vincent and the Grenadines (1)
- San Marino (1)
- Senegal (2)
- Serbia (8)
- Seychelles (2)
- Singapore (5)
- Slovakia (5)
- Slovenia (12)
- South Africa (18)
- Spain (13)
- Sri Lanka (2)
- Sudan (2)
- Suriname (2)
- Swaziland (1)
- Sweden (12)
- Switzerland (6)
- Syria (2)
- Chinese Taipei (3)
- Tajikistan (1)
- Tanzania (2)
- Thailand (2)
- Togo (1)
- Tonga (1)
- Trinidad and Tobago (1)
- Tunisia (4)
- Turkey (6)
- Turkmenistan (2)
- Uganda (2)
- Ukraine (12)
- United Arab Emirates (1)
- United States (47)
- Uruguay (2)
- Uzbekistan (2)
- Venezuela (8)
- Vietnam (1)
- Virgin Islands (1)
- Zambia (2)
- Zimbabwe (1)

== Medal table ==
Rank	Nation	Gold	Silver	Bronze	Total
1	United States	16	8	6	30
2	China	5	2	3	10
3	France	4	2	1	7
4	Netherlands	2	1	1	4
5	South Africa	2	1	0	3
6	Australia	1	6	3	10
7	Hungary	1	0	1	2
8	Lithuania	1	0	0	1
9	Japan	0	3	8	11
10	Russia	0	2	2	4
11	Belarus	0	2	0	2
11	South Korea	0	2	0	2
11	Spain	0	2	0	2
14	Great Britain	0	1	2	3
15	Brazil	0	1	1	2
15	Canada	0	1	1	2
17	Tunisia	0	0	1	1
Totals (17 entries)		32	34	30	96

Note: There were ties for silver in the men's 200 m freestyle and men's 100 m butterfly events.

== Results ==
=== Men's events ===
Games	Gold		Silver		Bronze	
50 m freestyle	Florent Manaudou; France	21.34	Cullen Jones; United States	21.54	César Cielo; Brazil	21.59
100 m freestyle	Nathan Adrian; United States	47.52	James Magnussen; Australia	47.53	Brent Hayden; Canada	47.80
200 m freestyle	Yannick Agnel; France	1:43.14 NR	Sun Yang; China Park Tae-Hwan; South Korea	1:44.93 NR 1:44.93	Not awarded as there was a tie for silver.	
400 m freestyle	Sun Yang; China	3:40.14 OR, AS	Park Tae-Hwan; South Korea	3:42.06	Peter Vanderkaay; United States	3:44.69
1500 m freestyle	Sun Yang; China	14:31.02 WR	Ryan Cochrane; Canada	14:39.63 AM	Oussama Mellouli; Tunisia	14:40.31
100 m backstroke	Matt Grevers; United States	52.16 OR	Nick Thoman; United States	52.92	Ryosuke Irie; Japan	52.97
200 m backstroke	Tyler Clary; United States	1:53.41 OR	Ryosuke Irie; Japan	1:53.78	Ryan Lochte; United States	1:53.94
100 m breaststroke	Cameron van der Burgh; South Africa	58.46 WR	Christian Sprenger; Australia	58.93	Brendan Hansen; United States	59.49
200 m breaststroke	Dániel Gyurta; Hungary	2:07.28 WR	Michael Jamieson; Great Britain	2:07.43 NR	Ryo Tateishi; Japan	2:08.29
100 m butterfly	Michael Phelps; United States	51.21	Chad le Clos; South Africa Yevgeny Korotyshkin; Russia	51.44	Not awarded as there was a tie for silver.	
200 m butterfly	Chad le Clos; South Africa	1:52.96 AF	Michael Phelps; United States	1:53.01	Takeshi Matsuda; Japan	1:53.21
200 m individual medley	Michael Phelps; United States	1:54.27	Ryan Lochte; United States	1:54.90	László Cseh; Hungary	1:56.22
400 m individual medley	Ryan Lochte; United States	4:05.18	Thiago Pereira; Brazil	4:08.86 =SA	Kosuke Hagino; Japan	4:08.94 AS
4 × 100 m freestyle relay	France; Amaury Leveaux (48.13); Fabien Gilot (47.67); Clément Lefert (47.39); Yannick Agnel (46.74); Alain Bernard^{[a]} Jérémy Stravius^{[a]}	3:09.93	United States; Nathan Adrian (47.89); Michael Phelps (47.15); Cullen Jones (47.60); Ryan Lochte (47.74); Jimmy Feigen^{[a]} Matt Grevers^{[a]} Ricky Berens^{[a]} Jason Lezak^{[a]}	3:10.38	Russia; Andrey Grechin (48.57); Nikita Lobintsev (47.39); Vladimir Morozov (47.85); Danila Izotov (47.60); Yevgeny Lagunov^{[a]} Sergey Fesikov^{[a]}	3:11.41
4 × 200 m freestyle relay	United States; Ryan Lochte (1:45.15); Conor Dwyer (1:45.23); Ricky Berens (1:45.27); Michael Phelps (1:44.05); Charlie Houchin^{[a]} Matt McLean^{[a]} Davis Tarwater^{[a]}	6:59.70	France; Amaury Leveaux (1:46.70); Grégory Mallet (1:46.83); Clément Lefert (1:46.00); Yannick Agnel (1:43.24); Jérémy Stravius^{[a]}	7:02.77 NR	China; Hao Yun (1:47.12); Li Yunqi (1:46.46); Jiang Haiqi (1:47.17); Sun Yang (1:45.55); Lü Zhiwu^{[a]} Dai Jun^{[a]}	7:06.30
4 × 100 m medley relay	United States; Matt Grevers (52.58); Brendan Hansen (59.19); Michael Phelps (50.73); Nathan Adrian (46.85); Nick Thoman^{[a]} Eric Shanteau^{[a]} Tyler McGill^{[a]} Cullen Jones^{[a]}	3:29.35	Japan; Ryosuke Irie (52.92); Kosuke Kitajima (58.64); Takeshi Matsuda (51.20); Takuro Fujii (48.50)	3:31.26	Australia; Hayden Stoeckel (53.71); Christian Sprenger (59.05); Matt Targett (51.60); James Magnussen (47.22); Brenton Rickard^{[a]} Tommaso D'Orsogna^{[a]}	3:31.58
AF African Record | AM Americas Record | SA South American Record | AS Asian Record | ER European Record | OC Oceanian Record | OR Olympic Record | WJR World Junior Record | WR World Record; NR National Record (any World Record is necessarily also an Olympic, area, and national record. Area records (for continental regions) are also national records)

^{a} Swimmers who participated in the heats only and received medals.

=== Women's events ===
Games	Gold		Silver		Bronze	
50 m freestyle	Ranomi Kromowidjojo; Netherlands	24.05 OR	Aliaksandra Herasimenia; Belarus	24.28 NR	Marleen Veldhuis; Netherlands	24.39
100 m freestyle	Ranomi Kromowidjojo; Netherlands	53.00 OR	Aliaksandra Herasimenia; Belarus	53.38 NR	Tang Yi; China	53.44
200 m freestyle	Allison Schmitt; United States	1:53.61 OR, AM	Camille Muffat; France	1:55.58	Bronte Barratt; Australia	1:55.81
400 m freestyle	Camille Muffat; France	4:01.45 OR	Allison Schmitt; United States	4:01.77 AM	Rebecca Adlington; Great Britain	4:03.01
800 m freestyle	Katie Ledecky; United States	8:14.63 AM	Mireia Belmonte García; Spain	8:18.76 NR	Rebecca Adlington; Great Britain	8:20.32
100 m backstroke	Missy Franklin; United States	58.33 AM	Emily Seebohm; Australia	58.68	Aya Terakawa; Japan	58.83 AS
200 m backstroke	Missy Franklin; United States	2:04.06 WR	Anastasia Zuyeva; Russia	2:05.92	Elizabeth Beisel; United States	2:06.55
100 m breaststroke	Rūta Meilutytė; Lithuania	1:05.47	Rebecca Soni; United States	1:05.55	Satomi Suzuki; Japan	1:06.46
200 m breaststroke	Rebecca Soni; United States	2:19.59 WR	Satomi Suzuki; Japan	2:20.72 =AS	Yuliya Yefimova; Russia	2:20.92 ER
100 m butterfly	Dana Vollmer; United States	55.98 WR	Lu Ying; China	56.87	Alicia Coutts; Australia	56.94
200 m butterfly	Jiao Liuyang; China	2:04.06 OR	Mireia Belmonte García; Spain	2:05.25 NR	Natsumi Hoshi; Japan	2:05.48
200 m individual medley	Ye Shiwen; China	2:07.57 OR, AS	Alicia Coutts; Australia	2:08.15	Caitlin Leverenz; United States	2:08.95
400 m individual medley	Ye Shiwen; China	4:28.43 WR	Elizabeth Beisel; United States	4:31.27	Li Xuanxu; China	4:32.91
4 × 100 m freestyle relay	Australia; Alicia Coutts (53.90); Cate Campbell (53.19); Brittany Elmslie (53.41); Melanie Schlanger (52.65); Emily Seebohm^{[b]} Yolane Kukla^{[b]} Libby Trickett^{[b]}	3:33.15 OR	Netherlands; Inge Dekker (54.67); Marleen Veldhuis (53.80); Femke Heemskerk (53.39); Ranomi Kromowidjojo (51.93); Hinkelien Schreuder^{[b]}	3:33.79	United States; Missy Franklin (53.52); Jessica Hardy (53.53); Lia Neal (53.65); Allison Schmitt (53.54); Amanda Weir^{[b]} Natalie Coughlin^{[b]}	3:34.24 AM
4 × 200 m freestyle relay	United States; Missy Franklin (1:55.96); Dana Vollmer (1:56.02); Shannon Vreeland (1:56.85); Allison Schmitt (1:54.09); Lauren Perdue^{[b]} Alyssa Anderson^{[b]}	7:42.92 OR	Australia; Bronte Barratt (1:55.76); Melanie Schlanger (1:55.62); Kylie Palmer (1:56.91); Alicia Coutts (1:56.12); Brittany Elmslie^{[b]} Angie Bainbridge^{[b]} Jade Neilsen^{[b]} Blair Evans^{[b]}	7:44.41	France; Camille Muffat (1:55.51); Charlotte Bonnet (1:57.78); Ophélie-Cyrielle Étienne (1:58.05); Coralie Balmy (1:56.15); Margaux Farrell^{[b]} Mylène Lazare^{[b]}	7:47.49 NR
4 × 100 m medley relay	United States; Missy Franklin (58.50); Rebecca Soni (1:04.82); Dana Vollmer (55.48); Allison Schmitt (53.25); Rachel Bootsma^{[b]} Breeja Larson^{[b]} Claire Donahue^{[b]} Jessica Hardy^{[b]}	3:52.05 WR	Australia; Emily Seebohm (59.01); Leisel Jones (1:06.06); Alicia Coutts (56.41); Melanie Schlanger (52.54); Brittany Elmslie^{[b]}	3:54.02	Japan; Aya Terakawa (58.99); Satomi Suzuki (1:05.96); Yuka Kato (57.36); Haruka Ueda (53.42)	3:55.73
AF African Record | AM Americas Record | SA South American Record | AS Asian Record | ER European Record | OC Oceanian Record | OR Olympic Record | WJR World Junior Record | WR World Record; NR National Record (any World Record is necessarily also an Olympic, area, and national record. Area records (for continental regions) are also national records)

^{b} Swimmers who participated in the heats only and received medals.

== Olympic and world records broken ==
=== Men ===
Event	Date	Round	Name	Nationality	Time	Record	Day
Men's 400 m freestyle	28 July	Final	Sun Yang	China	3:40.14	OR	1
Men's 100 m breaststroke	28 July	Semifinal	Cameron van der Burgh	South Africa	58.83	OR	1
Men's 100 m breaststroke	29 July	Final	Cameron van der Burgh	South Africa	58.46	WR	2
Men's 100 m backstroke	30 July	Final	Matt Grevers	United States	52.16	OR	3
Men's 200 m breaststroke	1 August	Final	Dániel Gyurta	Hungary	2:07.28	WR	5
Men's 200 m backstroke	2 August	Final	Tyler Clary	United States	1:53.41	OR	6
Men's 1500 m freestyle	4 August	Final	Sun Yang	China	14:31.02	WR	8

=== Women ===
Event	Date	Round	Name	Nationality	Time	Record	Day
Women's 100 m butterfly	28 July	Heats	Dana Vollmer	United States	56.25	OR	1
Women's 400 m individual medley	28 July	Final	Ye Shiwen	China	4:28.43	WR	1
Women's 4 × 100 m freestyle relay	28 July	Final	Alicia Coutts (53.90); Cate Campbell (53.19); Brittany Elmslie (53.41); Melanie Schlanger (52.65)	Australia	3:33.15	OR	1
Women's 100 m backstroke	29 July	Heats	Emily Seebohm	Australia	58.23	OR	2
Women's 100 m butterfly	29 July	Final	Dana Vollmer	United States	55.98	WR	2
Women's 400 m freestyle	29 July	Final	Camille Muffat	France	4:01.45	OR	2
Women's 200 m individual medley	30 July	Semifinal	Ye Shiwen	China	2:08.39	OR	3
Women's 200 m freestyle	31 July	Final	Allison Schmitt	United States	1:53.61	OR	4
Women's 200 m individual medley	31 July	Final	Ye Shiwen	China	2:07.57	OR	4
Women's 100 m freestyle	1 August	Semifinal	Ranomi Kromowidjojo	Netherlands	53.05	OR	5
Women's 200 m butterfly	1 August	Final	Jiao Liuyang	China	2:04.06	OR	5
Women's 200 m breaststroke	1 August	Semifinal	Rebecca Soni	United States	2:20.00	WR	5
Women's 4 × 200 m freestyle relay	1 August	Final	Missy Franklin (1:55.96); Dana Vollmer (1:56.02); Shannon Vreeland (1:56.85); Allison Schmitt (1:54.09)	United States	7:42.92	OR	5
Women's 200 m breaststroke	2 August	Final	Rebecca Soni	United States	2:19.59	WR	6
Women's 100 m freestyle	2 August	Final	Ranomi Kromowidjojo	Netherlands	53.00	OR	6
Women's 200 m backstroke	3 August	Final	Missy Franklin	United States	2:04.06	WR	7
Women's 50 m freestyle	4 August	Final	Ranomi Kromowidjojo	Netherlands	24.05	OR	8
Women's 4 × 100 m medley relay	4 August	Final	Missy Franklin (58.50); Rebecca Soni (1:04.82); Dana Vollmer (55.48); Allison Schmitt (53.25)	United States	3:52.05	WR	8

- All world records (WR) are subsequently Olympic records (OR).

Derya Büyükuncu and Lars Frölander were the first swimmers to participate in six consecutive Olympic Games (1992-2012).

== Controversies ==
In the women's 400-metre individual medley, Chinese Ye Shiwen won in a world-record time of 4:28.43. After the race, Ye had allegations against her suggesting the use of drugs that drew comment from the International Olympic Committee and FINA who defended Ye. Ye has never tested positive of any performance-enhancing drugs. Some claim the accusations were a result of xenophobia towards the Chinese.

In the final of the 100-metre breaststroke, South African Cameron van der Burgh won in a world-record time of 58.46, bettering the previous record of 58.58 held by Brenton Rickard of Australia. After the race however, underwater camera footage showed winner van der Burgh did three illegal butterfly kicks on the underwater pullout (rules allow for one kick). Van der Burgh later admitted to the illegal move and justified the act by saying if he was not doing it, "you are falling behind or giving yourself a disadvantage."

== Gallery of the medalists ==
Some of the Olympic medalists in London:

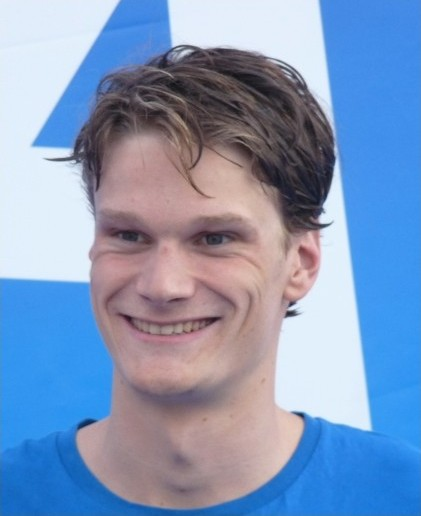
Yannick Agnel, winner of the 200-metre freestyle and 4 × 100-metre freestyle relay.

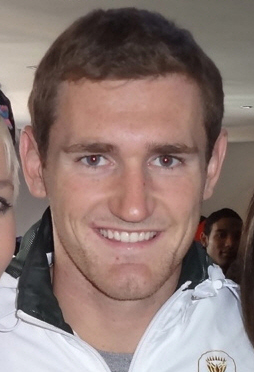
Cameron van der Burgh, winner of the 100-metre breaststroke.

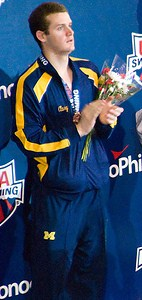
Tyler Clary, winner of the 200-metre backstroke.

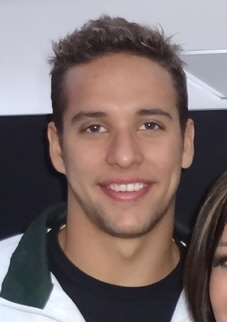
Chad le Clos, winner of the 200-metre butterfly.

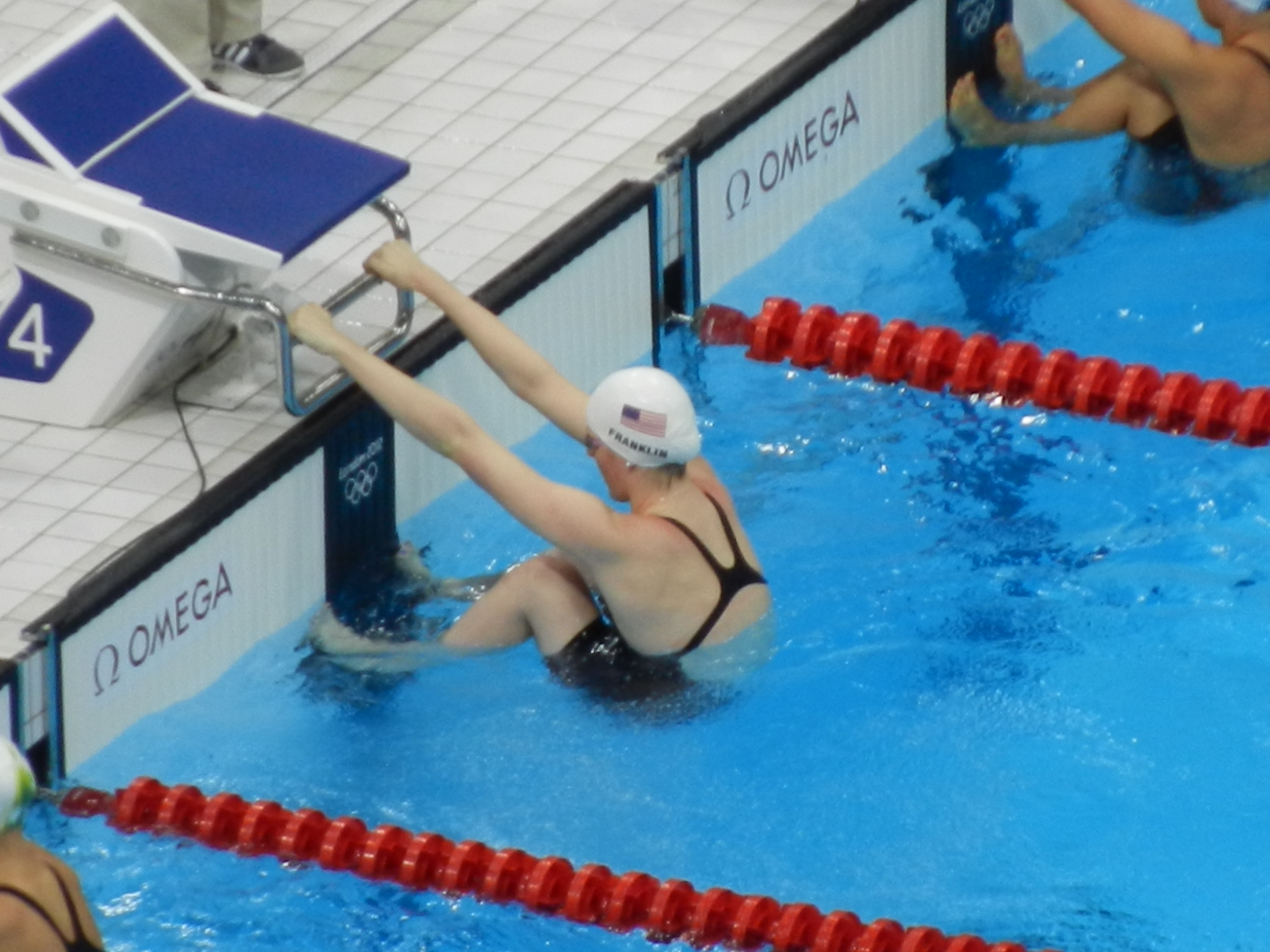
Missy Franklin, winner of the 100-metre backstroke, 200-metre backstroke, 4 × 200-metre freestyle, and 4 × 100-metre medley.

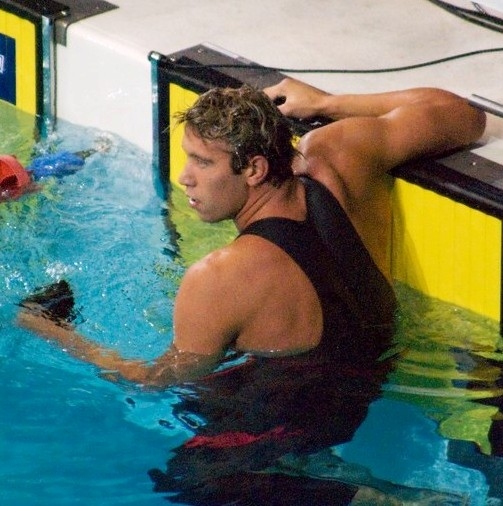
Matt Grevers, winner of the 100-metre backstroke and 4 × 100-metre medley.

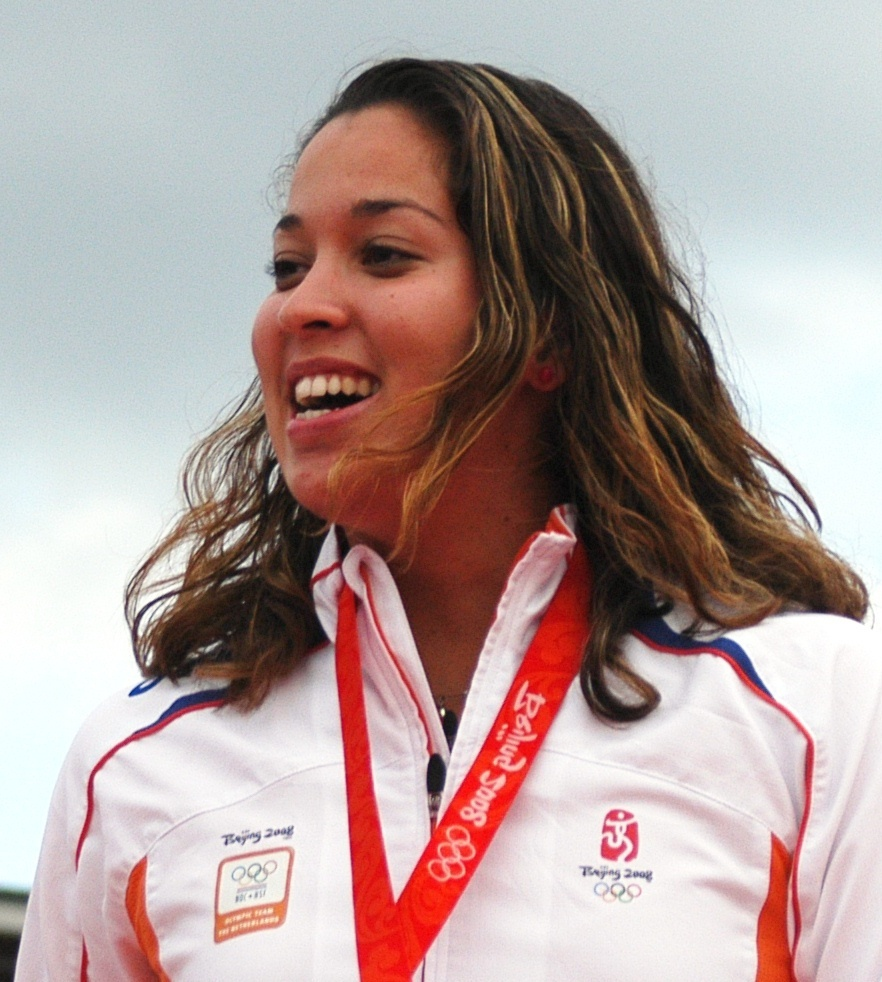
Ranomi Kromowidjojo, winner of the 50-metre and 100-metre freestyle.

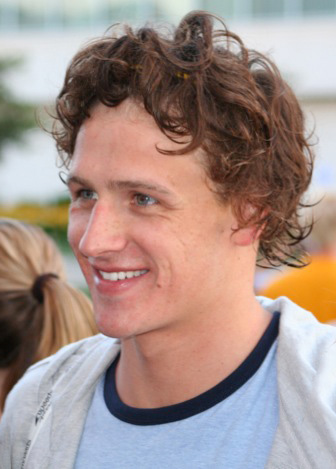
Ryan Lochte, winner of the 400-metre individual medley and 4 × 200-metre freestyle.

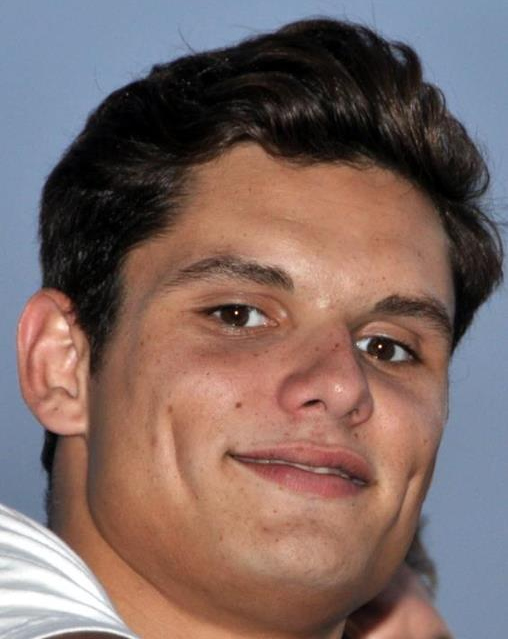
Florent Manaudou, winner of the 50-metre freestyle.

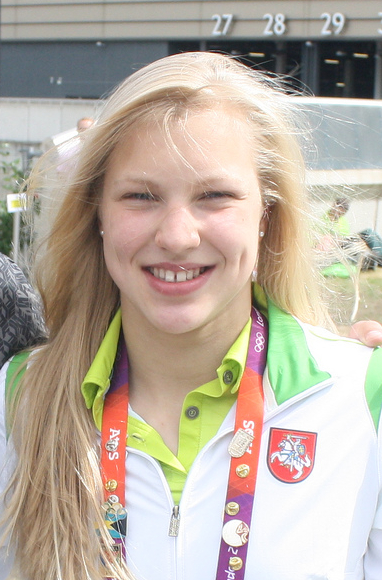
Rūta Meilutytė, winner of the 100-metre breaststroke.

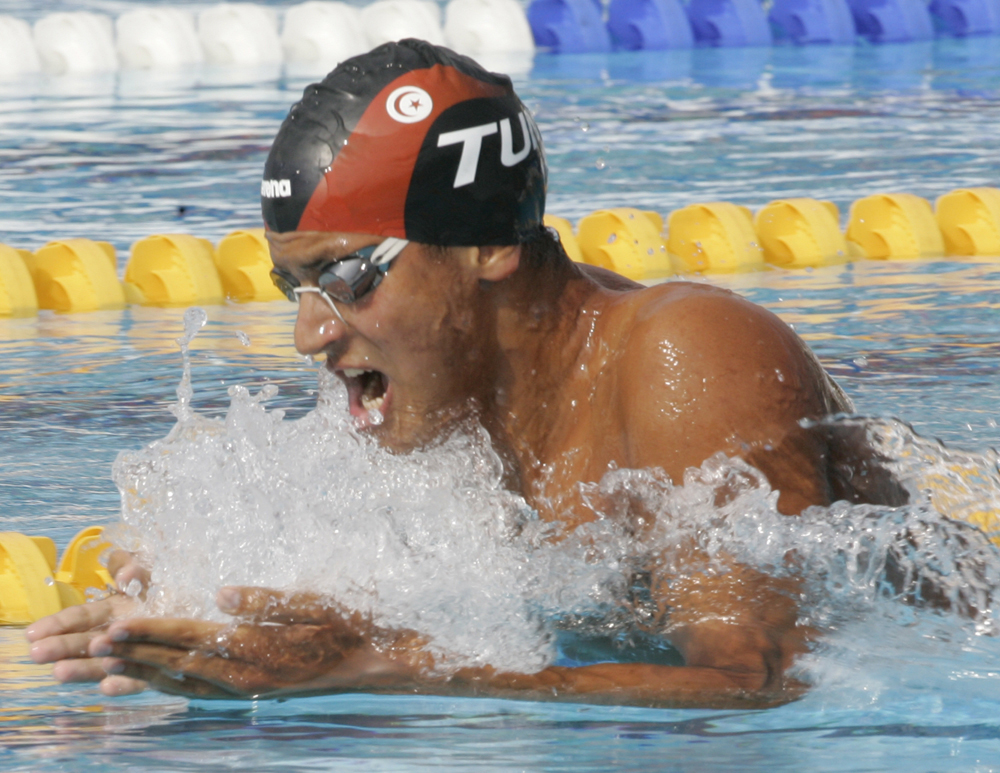
Oussama Mellouli, winner of the 10-kilometre marathon.

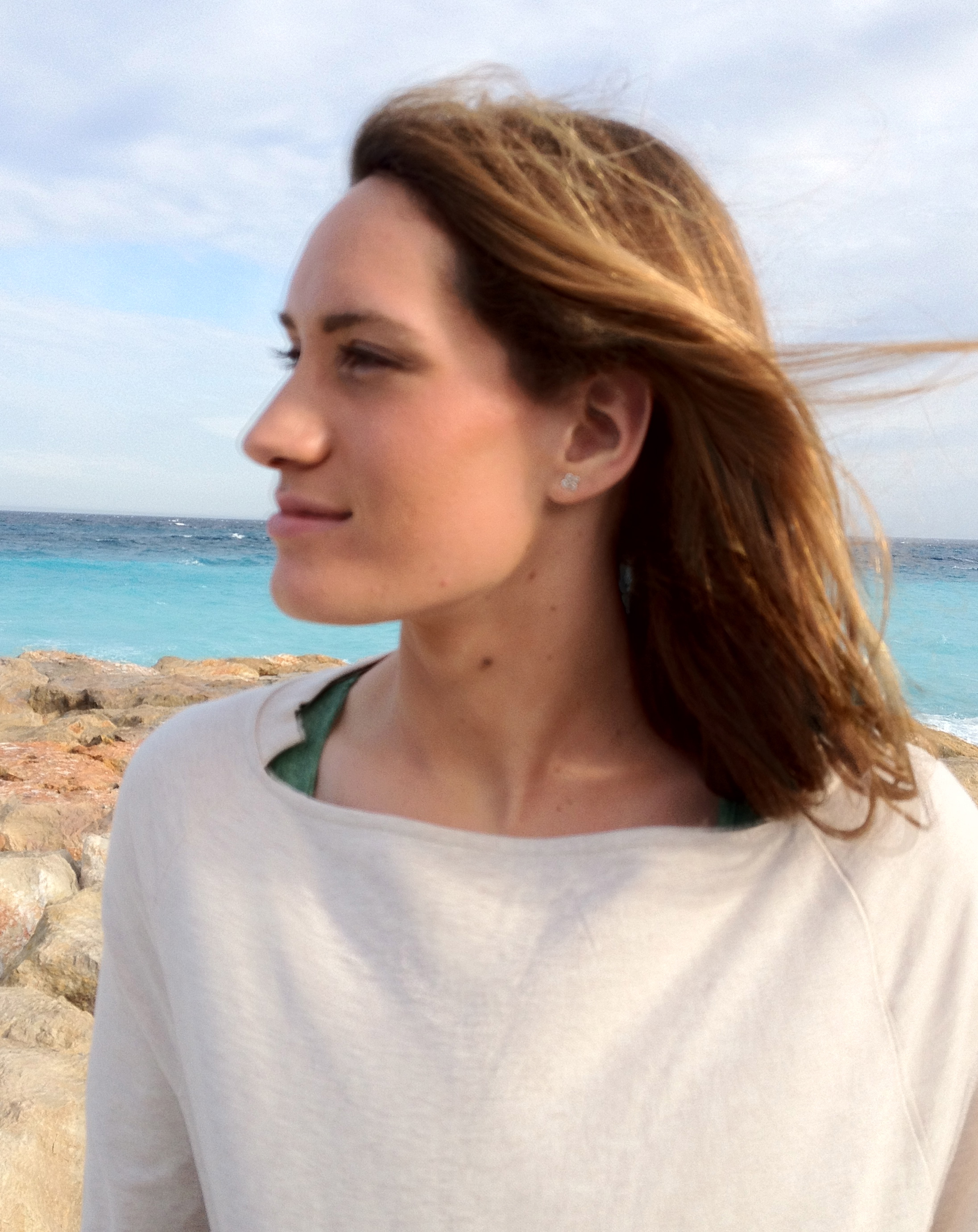
Camille Muffat, winner of the 400-metre freestyle.

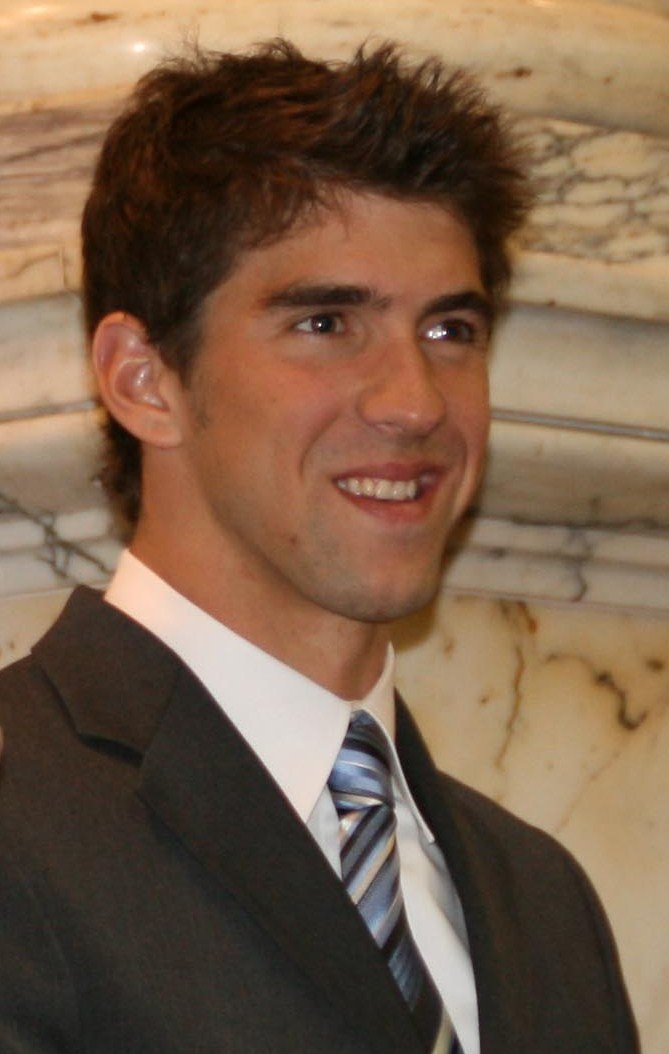
Michael Phelps, winner of the 100-metre butterfly, 200-metre individual medley, 4 × 200-metre freestyle, and 4 × 100-metre medley.

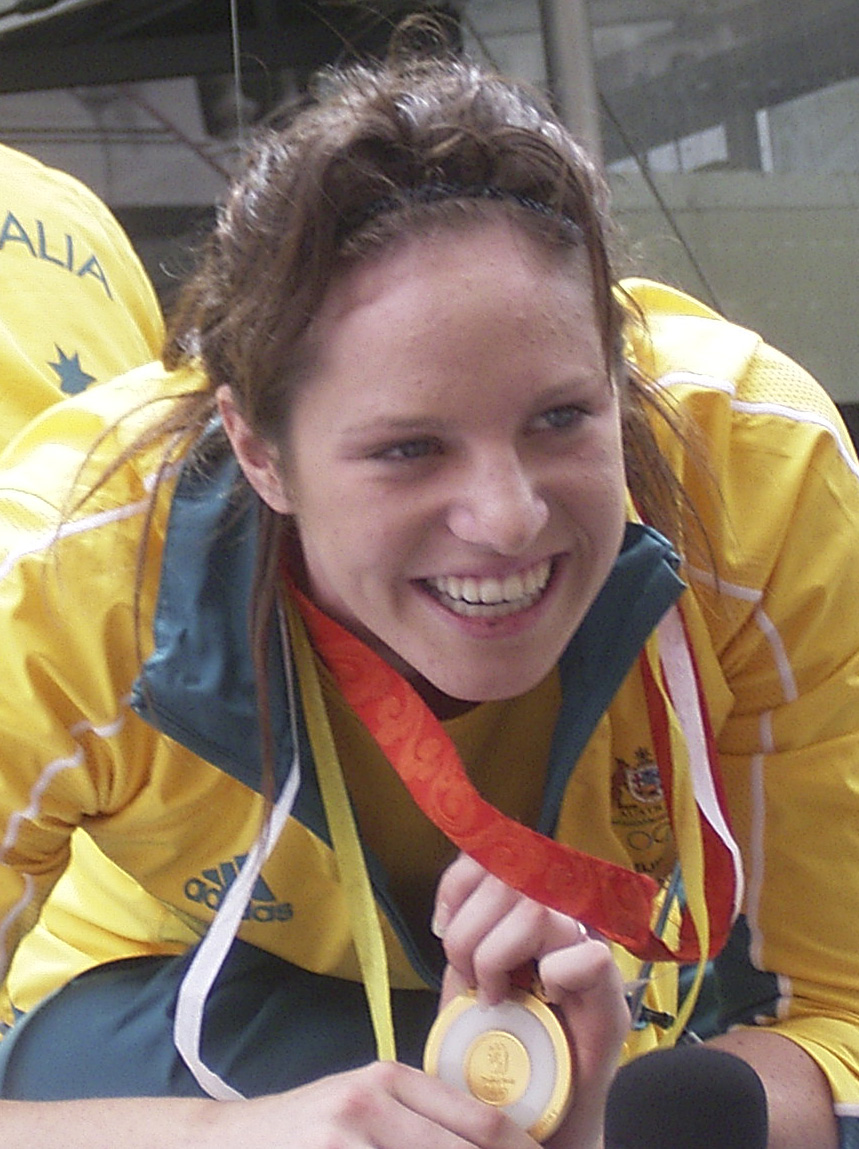
Emily Seebohm, member of the winning 4 × 100-metre freestyle.

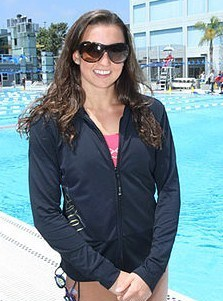
Rebecca Soni, winner of the 200-metre breaststroke and 4 × 100-metre medley.
