= 2012 United States Olympic trials (swimming) =

Events for American swimmers to qualify in 2012 London Olympics

2012 United States Olympic Trials (swimming)
- Host city: Omaha, Nebraska, U.S.
- Date: June 25 – July 2
- Venue: CenturyLink Center
- Athletes: 1831
- Events: 26 (men: 13; women: 13)

The 2012 United States Olympic trials for swimming events were held from June 25 to July 2 at the CenturyLink Center Omaha in Omaha, Nebraska. It was the qualifying meet for American swimmers who hoped to compete at the 2012 Summer Olympics in London.

== Qualification criteria ==
47 swimmers (not including open water swimmers) were chosen for the 2012 Summer Olympics. To make the Olympic team, a swimmer must be in the top two in one of the thirteen individual events. To be considered for the U.S. 4×100-meter and 4×200-meter freestyle relay teams, a swimmer must place in the top six in the 100-meter and 200-meter freestyle, respectively. Swimmers must have achieved a time standard to be eligible to compete in the U.S. Olympic trials:

Event	Men	Women
50 m freestyle	23.49	26.39
100 m freestyle	51.49	57.19
200 m freestyle	1:52.89	2:03.19
400 m freestyle	3:59.99	4:19.39
800 m freestyle	—	8:50.49
1500 m freestyle	15:53.59	—
100 m backstroke	57.59	1:03.99
200 m backstroke	2:04.99	2:17.99
100 m breaststroke	1:04.69	1:12.19
200 m breaststroke	2:20.79	2:35.99
100 m butterfly	55.29	1:01.99
200 m butterfly	2:03.99	2:16.49
200 m individual medley	2:06.59	2:19.49
400 m individual medley	4:30.49	4:55.89

- Information retrieved from USA Swimming.

== Events ==
The meet featured twenty-six individual events, all swum in a long course (50-meter) pool: thirteen events for men and thirteen events for women. Events 200 meters and shorter were held with preliminaries, semifinals and finals, while events 400 meters and longer were held with preliminaries and finals. The semifinals featured sixteen swimmers in two heats; the finals included eight swimmers in a single heat. Preliminaries were seeded with ten lanes. Event order, which mimicked that of the 2012 Olympics, except for the Olympic relay events, was:

Date	Monday June 25, 2012	Tuesday June 26, 2012	Wednesday June 27, 2012	Thursday June 28, 2012
M o r n i n g	Men's 400 IM (heats); Women's 100 butterfly (heats); Men's 400 freestyle (heats); Women's 400 IM (heats); Men's 100 breaststroke (heats); Women's 100 butterfly (swim-off)	Women's 100 backstroke (heats); Men's 200 freestyle (heats); Women's 100 breaststroke (heats); Men's 100 backstroke (heats); Women's 400 freestyle (heats)	Women's 200 freestyle (heats); Men's 200 butterfly (heats); Women's 200 IM (heats)	Men's 100 freestyle (heats); Women's 200 butterfly (heats); Men's 200 breaststroke (heats)
E v e n i n g	Men's 400 IM (final); Women's 100 butterfly (semi-finals); Men's 400 freestyle (final); Women's 400 IM (final); Men's 100 breaststroke (semi-finals)	Women's 100 butterfly (final); Men's 200 freestyle (semi-finals); Women's 100 breaststroke (semi-finals); Men's 100 breaststroke (final); Women's 400 freestyle (final); Men's 100 backstroke (semi-finals); Women's 100 backstroke (semi-finals)	Women's 200 freestyle (semi-finals); Men's 200 freestyle (final); Women's 100 backstroke (final); Men's 100 backstroke (final); Women's 100 breaststroke (final); Men's 200 butterfly (semi-finals); Women's 200 IM (semi-finals)	Men's 100 freestyle (semi-finals); Women's 200 freestyle (final); Men's 200 butterfly (final); Women's 200 butterfly (semi-finals); Men's 200 breaststroke (semi-finals); Women's 200 IM (final)
Date	Friday June 29, 2012	Saturday June 30, 2012	Sunday July 1, 2012	Monday July 2, 2012
M o r n i n g	Women's 100 freestyle (heats); Men's 200 backstroke (heats); Women's 200 breaststroke (heats); Men's 200 IM (heats); Women's 200 breaststroke (swim-off)	Men's 50 freestyle (heats); Women's 800 freestyle (heats); Men's 100 butterfly (heats); Women's 200 backstroke (heats)	Women's 50 freestyle (heats); Men's 1500 freestyle (heats)	No morning session.
E v e n i n g	Men's 200 breaststroke (final); Women's 100 freestyle (semi-finals); Men's 200 backstroke (semi-finals); Women's 200 butterfly (final); Men's 100 freestyle (final); Women's 200 breaststroke (semi-finals); Men's 200 IM (semi-finals)	Men's 50 freestyle (semi-finals); Women's 200 breaststroke (final); Men's 200 backstroke (final); Women's 200 backstroke (semi-finals); Men's 200 IM (final); Women's 100 freestyle (final); Men's 100 butterfly (semi-finals)	Women's 200 backstroke (final); Men's 100 butterfly (final); Women's 800 freestyle (final); Men's 50 freestyle (final); Women's 50 freestyle (semi-finals)	Women's 50 freestyle (final); Men's 1500 freestyle (final)

Note: prelims/semifinals/finals were swum in events 200 meters and shorter; prelims/finals in events 400 meters or longer. For prelims/semifinals/finals events, prelims and semis were on the same day, with finals the following evening. For the 400-meter events, prelims and finals were on the same day. For the 800 and 1500 meter races, prelims are in the morning of one day, with finals in the evening of the next day.

== U.S. Olympic Team ==
The following swimmers qualified to compete at the 2012 Summer Olympics (for pool events):

=== Men ===
Nathan Adrian, Clark Burckle, Tyler Clary, Conor Dwyer, Anthony Ervin, Jimmy Feigen, Andrew Gemmell, Matt Grevers, Brendan Hansen, Charlie Houchin, Connor Jaeger, Cullen Jones, Jason Lezak, Ryan Lochte, Tyler McGill, Matt McLean, Michael Phelps, Eric Shanteau, Davis Tarwater, Nick Thoman, Peter Vanderkaay, and Scott Weltz.

=== Women ===
Cammile Adams, Alyssa Anderson, Elizabeth Beisel, Rachel Bootsma, Natalie Coughlin, Claire Donahue, Missy Franklin, Jessica Hardy, Kathleen Hersey, Kara Lynn Joyce, Ariana Kukors, Breeja Larson, Micah Lawrence, Katie Ledecky, Caitlin Leverenz, Lia Neal, Lauren Perdue, Allison Schmitt, Rebecca Soni, Chloe Sutton, Dana Vollmer, Shannon Vreeland, Amanda Weir, and Kate Ziegler.

== Results ==
Key: Highlighted swimmers achieved the qualification conditions to be included in the Olympic team in that respective event.

=== Men's events ===
Event	Gold		Silver		Bronze	
50 m freestyle	Cullen Jones	21.59	Anthony Ervin	21.60	Nathan Adrian	21.68
100 m freestyle	Nathan Adrian	48.10	Cullen Jones	48.46	Matt Grevers	48.55
200 m freestyle	Michael Phelps	1:45.70	Ryan Lochte	1:45.75	Ricky Berens	1:46.56
400 m freestyle	Peter Vanderkaay	3:47.67	Conor Dwyer	3:47.83	Michael Klueh	3:48.17
1500 m freestyle	Andrew Gemmell	14:52.19	Connor Jaeger	14:52.51	Chad La Tourette	14:57.53
100 m backstroke	Matt Grevers	52.08	Nick Thoman	52.86	David Plummer	52.98
200 m backstroke	Ryan Lochte	1:54.54	Tyler Clary	1:54.88	Nick Thoman	1:57.06
100 m breaststroke	Brendan Hansen	59.68	Eric Shanteau	1:00.15	Kevin Cordes	1:00.58
200 m breaststroke	Scott Weltz	2:09.01	Clark Burckle	2:09.97	Eric Shanteau	2:10.05
100 m butterfly	Michael Phelps	51.14	Tyler McGill	51.32	Ryan Lochte	51.65
200 m butterfly	Michael Phelps	1:53.65	Tyler Clary	1:55.12	Bobby Bollier	1:55.79
200 m IM	Michael Phelps	1:54.84	Ryan Lochte	1:54.93	Conor Dwyer	1:58.92
400 m IM	Ryan Lochte	4:07.06	Michael Phelps	4:07.89	Tyler Clary	4:09.92

=== Women's events ===
Event	Gold		Silver		Bronze	
50 m freestyle	Jessica Hardy	24.50	Kara Lynn Joyce	24.73	Christine Magnuson	24.78
100 m freestyle	Jessica Hardy	53.96	Missy Franklin	54.15	Allison Schmitt	54.30
200 m freestyle	Allison Schmitt	1:54.40 AM	Missy Franklin	1:56.79	Dana Vollmer	1:57.47
400 m freestyle	Allison Schmitt	4:02.84	Chloe Sutton	4:04.18	Katie Ledecky	4:05.00
800 m freestyle	Katie Ledecky	8:19.78	Kate Ziegler	8:21.87	Haley Anderson	8:26.60
100 m backstroke	Missy Franklin	58.85 AM	Rachel Bootsma	59.49	Natalie Coughlin	1:00.06
200 m backstroke	Missy Franklin	2:06.12	Elizabeth Beisel	2:07.58	Elizabeth Pelton	2:08.06
100 m breaststroke	Breeja Larson	1:05.92	Rebecca Soni	1:05.99	Jessica Hardy	1:06.53
200 m breaststroke	Rebecca Soni	2:21.13	Micah Lawrence	2:23.03	Andrea Kropp	2:24.82
100 m butterfly	Dana Vollmer	56.50	Claire Donahue	57.57	Kathleen Hersey	58.16
200 m butterfly	Cammile Adams	2:06.52	Kathleen Hersey	2:07.72	Kim Vandenberg	2:08.99
200 m IM	Caitlin Leverenz	2:10.22	Ariana Kukors	2:11.30	Elizabeth Pelton	2:11.55
400 m IM	Elizabeth Beisel	4:31.74	Caitlin Leverenz	4:34.48	Cammile Adams	4:38.62

== See also ==
- United States at the 2012 Summer Olympics
- United States Olympic Trials (swimming)
- USA Swimming
