= Marathon swimming at the 2020 Summer Olympics – Women's 10 kilometre =

Women's marathon swimming at the Games of the XXXII Olympiad
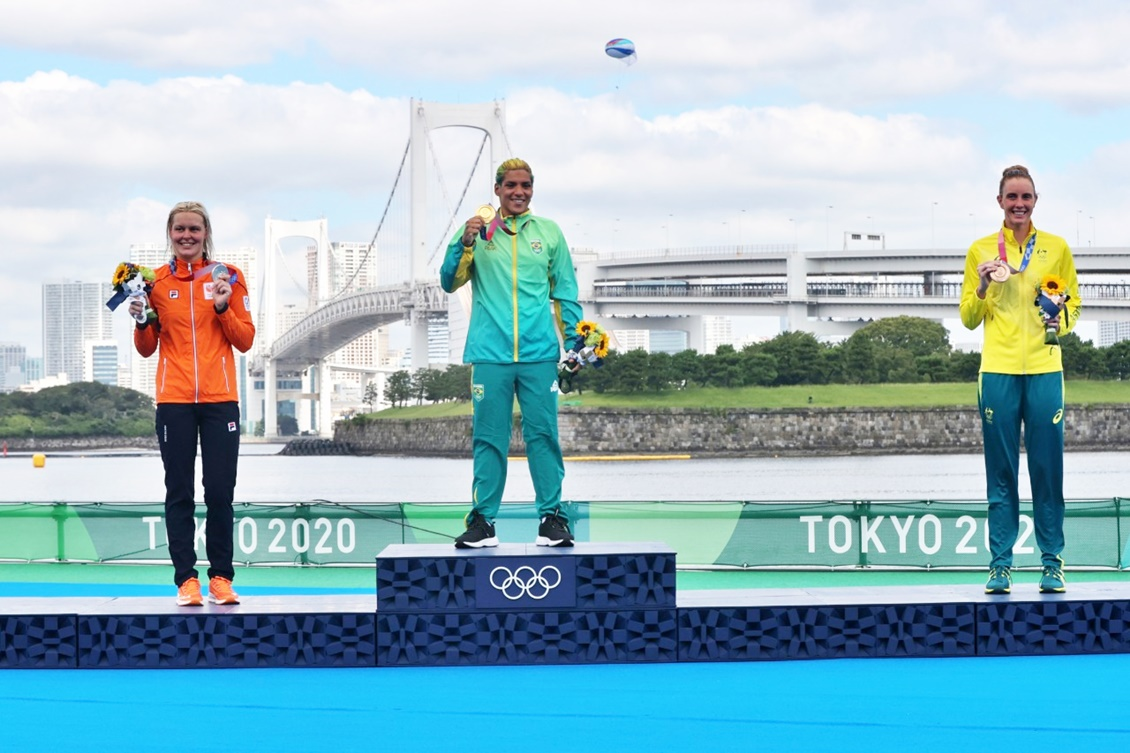
- Venue: Odaiba Marine Park
- Dates: 4 August 2021
- Competitors: 25 from 23 nations
- Winning time: 1:59:30.8

Medalists
1st place, gold medalist(s)		Ana Marcela Cunha	Brazil
2nd place, silver medalist(s)		Sharon van Rouwendaal	Netherlands
3rd place, bronze medalist(s)		Kareena Lee	Australia

The women's marathon swimming 10 kilometre event at the 2020 Summer Olympics was held on 4 August 2021 at the Odaiba Marine Park. It was the fourth appearance of the event, having first been held in 2008.

Ana Marcela Cunha won with a time of 1:59:30.8, becoming the first Brazilian woman swimmer to win a gold medal in the Olympics. Former Olympic gold medalist Sharon van Rouwendaal of the Netherlands finished second, with Kareena Lee of Australia taking the bronze.

== Qualification ==
The event featured a field of 25 swimmers:

- 10: the top-10 finishers in the 10 km races at the 2019 World Aquatics Championships (maximum of 2 per NOC)
- 9: the top-9 finishers at the 2020 Olympic Marathon Swim Qualifier, open only to NOCs with no qualified swimmers (maximum of 1 per NOC)
- 5: one representative from each FINA continent (Africa, Americas, Asia, Europe and Oceania), based on the finishes at the 2020 Olympic Qualifier
- 1: from the host nation (Japan) if not already qualified. If Japan had qualified for the race by other means, this spot would have been allocated back into the general pool above (2020 Olympic Marathon Swim Qualifier).

== Competition format ==
Unlike all of the swimming events in the pool, the men's and women's marathon swimming 10 kilometre races are held in open water. No preliminary heats are held, with only the single mass-start race being contested. The race is held using freestyle swimming, with a lack of stroke regulations.

== Schedule ==
All times are Japan Standard Time (UTC+9)

Date	Time	Round
4 August 2021	6:30	Final

== Results ==
Rank	Swimmer	Nation	Time	Time behind	Notes
1st place, gold medalist(s)	Ana Marcela Cunha	Brazil	1:59:30.8		
2nd place, silver medalist(s)	Sharon van Rouwendaal	Netherlands	1:59:31.7	+0.9	
3rd place, bronze medalist(s)	Kareena Lee	Australia	1:59:32.5	+1.7	
4	Anna Olasz	Hungary	1:59:34.8	+4.0	
5	Leonie Beck	Germany	1:59:35.1	+4.3	
6	Haley Anderson	United States	1:59:36.9	+6.1	
7	Ashley Twichell	United States	1:59:37.9	+7.1	
8	Xin Xin	China	2:00:10.1	+39.3	Warning
9	Lara Grangeon	France	2:00:57.3	+1:26.5	
10	Finnia Wunram	Germany	2:01:01.9	+1:31.1	
11	Samantha Arévalo	Ecuador	2:01:30.6	+1:59.8	Warning
12	Cecilia Biagioli	Argentina	2:01:31.7	+2:00.9	
13	Yumi Kida	Japan	2:01:40.9	+2:10.1	
14	Rachele Bruni	Italy	2:02:10.2	+2:39.4	
15	Anastasiya Kirpichnikova	ROC	2:03:17.5	+3:46.7	
16	Paula Ruiz	Spain	2:03:17.6	+3:46.8	Warning
17	Angélica André	Portugal	2:04:40.7	+5:09.9	
18	Kate Sanderson	Canada	2:04:59.1	+5:28.3	
19	Alice Dearing	Great Britain	2:05:03.2	+5:32.4	
20	Paola Pérez	Venezuela	2:05:45.0	+6:14.2	
21	Michelle Weber	South Africa	2:06:56.5	+7:25.7	
22	Krystyna Panchishko	Ukraine	2:07:35.1	+8:04.3	
23	Chantal Liew	Singapore	2:08:17.9	+8:47.1	
24	Špela Perše	Slovenia	2:08:33.0	+9:02.2	
25	Souad Cherouati	Algeria	2:17:21.6	+17:50.8	
