= 2010 FINA World Swimming Championships (25 m) – Women's 4 × 200 metre freestyle relay =

Swimming championship

Women's 4 × 200 metre freestyle relay at the 2010 FINA World Swimming Championships (25 m)
- Dates: 15 December 2010
- Teams: 13
- Winning time: 7:35.94 WR

Medalists
gold medal	China
silver medal	Australia
bronze medal	France

The Women's 4 × 200 Freestyle Relay at the 10th FINA World Swimming Championships (25m) was swum on 15 December 2010 in Dubai, United Arab Emirates. 13 nations swam in the prelims, with the top-8 finishers swimming again in the final.

In the final, the top-4 teams all swam under the existing World Record in the event.

== Records ==
At the start of the event, the World (WR) and Championship records (CR) was:

Type	Nation	Swimmers	Time	Location	Date
WR; CR	Netherlands	Inge Dekker (1:55.36); Femke Heemskerk (1:53.44); Marleen Veldhuis (1:54.17); Ranomi Kromowidjojo (1:55.93)	7:38.90	Manchester	9 April 2008

The following records were established during the competition:

- 800 Free Relay (WR): 7:35.94, China
- 200 Freestyle (CR): 1:53.17, (France) Camille Muffat (in the final)

== Results ==
=== Heats ===
Rank	Heat	Lane	Nation	Name	Time	Notes
1	2	5	United States	Missy Franklin (1:55.65); Dagny Knutson (1:55.13); Jasmine Tosky (1:56.60); Katie Hoff (1:53.25)	7:40.63	Q
2	1	4	Australia	Blair Evans (1.55.59); Jade Neilsen (1.55.59); Kelly Stubbins (1.56.52); Kylie Palmer (1.53.22)	7:40.92	Q
3	1	6	China	Pang Jiaying (1:55.65); Wang Shijia (1:57.38); Chen Qian (1:54.17); Zhu Qianwei (1:53.90)	7:41.10	Q
4	2	2	France	Ophélie Etienne (1:55.77); Coralie Balmy (1:55.28); Mylène Lazare (1:56.44); Camille Muffat (1:55.69)	7:43.18	Q
5	1	2	Hungary	Katinka Hosszú (1:57.44); Ágnes Mutina (1:55.47); Eszter Dara (1:58.47); Evelyn Verrasztó (1:54.95)	7:46.33	Q
6	2	4	Sweden	Gabriella Fagundez (1:55.98); Ida Varga (1:56.22); Michelle Coleman (1:59.51); Sarah Sjöström (1:57.54)	7:49.25	Q
7	2	7	Italy	Chiara Luccetti (1:57.98); Alice Nesti (1:57.43); Francesca Segat (1:57.47); Renata Spagnolo (1:56.54)	7:49.42	Q
8	2	3	Russia	Elena Sokolova (1:59.02); Victoria Malyutina (1:58.10); Daria Belyakina (1:57.00); Veronika Popova (1:56.02)	7:50.14	Q
9	1	5	Canada	Alexandra Gabor (1:59.13); Sinead Russell (1:59.07); Amanda Reason (1:58.08); Genevieve Saumur (1:56.40)	7:52.68	
10	1	3	Chinese Taipei	Cheng Wan-Jung (2:06.58); Chen I-Chuan (2:10.36); Chen Ting (2:04.40); Ting Sheng-Yo (2:03.66)	8:25.00	
11	2	1	Peru	Daniela Kaori Miyahara (2:07.61); Massie Milagros Carrillo (2:10.97); Oriele Alejandra Espinoza (2:08.19); Andrea Cedron (2:06.45)	8:33.22	
12	2	6	Macau	Ma Cheok Mei (2:09.99); Tan Chi Yan (2:15.83); Lou Wai Sam (2:15.58); Vong Erica Man Wai (2:14.82)	8:56.22	
–	1	7	Malta	Talisa Pace (2:11.56); Davina Mangion; Melinda Sue Micallef; Nicola Muscat	DSQ	

=== Final ===
Rank	Lane	Nation	Name	Time	Notes
1st place, gold medalist(s)	3	China	Chen Qian (1.54.73); Tang Yi (1.53.54); Liu Jing (1.53.59); Zhu Qianwei (1.54.08)	7:35.94	WR
2nd place, silver medalist(s)	5	Australia	Blair Evans (1:54.87); Jade Neilsen (1:54.87); Kelly Stubbins (1:55.41); Kylie Palmer (1:52.42)	7:37.57	OC
3rd place, bronze medalist(s)	6	France	Camille Muffat (1:53.17) CR; Coralie Balmy (1:53.71); Mylène Lazare (1:56.24); Ophélie Etienne (1:55.21)	7:38.33	ER
4	4	United States	Katie Hoff (1:53.37); Dagny Knutson (1:56.15); Missy Franklin (1:55.30); Dana Vollmer (1:53.60)	7:38.42	AM
5	7	Sweden	Gabriella Fagundez (1:56.42); Sarah Sjöström (1:54.88); Ida Varga (1:55.31); Petra Granlund (1:55.30)	7:41.91	NR
6	1	Italy	Renata Spagnolo (1:57.60); Alice Nesti (1:58.20); Federica Pellegrini (1:54.70); Chiara Luccetti (1:56.30)	7:46.80	
7	2	Hungary	Evelyn Verrasztó (1:55.23); Ágnes Mutina (1:55.76); Katinka Hosszú (1:58.20); Eszter Dara (1:58.51)	7:47.70	
8	8	Russia	Veronika Popova (1:57.69); Daria Belyakina (1:56.55); Victoria Malyutina (1:57.95); Elena Sokolova (1:56.78)	7:48.97	
