= Swimming at the 2012 Summer Olympics – Women's 4 × 200 metre freestyle relay =

Women's 4 × 200 metre freestyle relay at the Games of the XXX Olympiad
- Venue: London Aquatics Centre
- Dates: 1 August 2012 (heats & final)
- Competitors: 84 from 16 nations
- Teams: 16
- Winning time: 7:42.92 OR

Medalists
1st place, gold medalist(s)		Missy Franklin, Dana Vollmer, Shannon Vreeland, Allison Schmitt, Alyssa Anderson*, Lauren Perdue*	United States
2nd place, silver medalist(s)		Bronte Barratt, Melanie Schlanger, Kylie Palmer, Alicia Coutts, Brittany Elmslie*, Angie Bainbridge*, Jade Neilsen*, Blair Evans*	Australia
3rd place, bronze medalist(s)		Camille Muffat, Charlotte Bonnet, Ophélie-Cyrielle Étienne, Coralie Balmy, Margaux Farrell*, Mylène Lazare*; *Indicates the swimmer only competed in the preliminary heats.	France

The women's 4 × 200 metre freestyle relay event at the 2012 Summer Olympics took place on 1 August at the London Aquatics Centre in London, United Kingdom.

The U.S. women's team smashed a new Olympic record to recapture their freestyle relay title with the help of a sterling anchor leg from Allison Schmitt. Trailing throughout most of the race with a back-to-back lead from Australia and France before the final exchange, Schmitt demolished the field with a remarkable split of 1:54.09 to deliver the American foursome of Missy Franklin (1:55.96), Dana Vollmer (1:56.02), and Shannon Vreeland (1:56.85) a gold medal and an Olympic record in 7:42.92.

Australia's Bronte Barratt (1:55.76), Melanie Schlanger (1:55.62), and Kylie Palmer (1:56.91) handed Alicia Coutts the anchor duties at the final exchange with a 0.54-second lead, but Coutts' split of 1:56.12 was just over a full-body length behind Schmitt's stunning anchor, leaving them with a silver medal in 7:44.41. Meanwhile, the fantastic French quartet of Camille Muffat (1:55.51), Charlotte Bonnet (1:57.78), Ophélie-Cyrielle Étienne (1:58.05), and Coralie Balmy (1:56.15) took home the bronze in 7:47.49.

Canada's Barbara Jardin (1:57.96), Samantha Cheverton (1:56.91), Amanda Reason (1:59.32), and Brittany MacLean (1:56.46) missed the podium with a fourth-place time in 7:50.65, while Great Britain's home favorite foursome of Caitlin McClatchey (1:58.66), Rebecca Turner (1:57.39), Hannah Miley (1:58.12), and Joanne Jackson (1:58.20) struggled to mount a challenge in an Olympic-medal race as they finished fifth in 7:52.37. China (7:53.11), led by medley double champion Ye Shiwen, Italy (7:56.30), and Japan (7:56.73) rounded out the championship finale.

== Records ==
Prior to this competition, the existing world and Olympic records were as follows.

World record	China (CHN); Yang Yu (1:55.47); Zhu Qianwei (1:55.79); Liu Jing (1:56.09); Pang Jiaying (1:54.73)	7:42.08	Rome, Italy	30 July 2009
Olympic record	Australia; Stephanie Rice (1:56.60); Bronte Barratt (1:56.58); Kylie Palmer (1:55.22); Linda Mackenzie (1:55.91)	7:44.31	Beijing, China	14 August 2008

The following records were established during the competition:

Date	Event	Name	Nation	Time	Record
August 1	Final	Missy Franklin (1:55.96); Dana Vollmer (1:56.02); Shannon Vreeland (1:56.85); Allison Schmitt (1:54.09)	United States	7:42.92	OR

== Results ==
=== Heats ===
Rank	Heat	Lane	Nation	Swimmers	Time	Notes
1	1	4	Australia	Brittany Elmslie (1:57.50); Angie Bainbridge (1:57.70); Jade Neilsen (1:57.25); Blair Evans (1:56.99)	7:49.44	Q
2	2	4	United States	Lauren Perdue (1:58.07); Shannon Vreeland (1:57.04); Alyssa Anderson (1:57.33); Dana Vollmer (1:58.31)	7:50.75	Q
3	1	5	Canada	Barbara Jardin (1:57.76); Samantha Cheverton (1:57.38); Amanda Reason (1:58.51); Brittany MacLean (1:57.19)	7:50.84	Q
4	2	6	Italy	Alice Mizzau (1:57.95); Alice Nesti (1:59.80); Diletta Carli (1:58.54); Federica Pellegrini (1:56.46)	7:52.75	Q
5	1	3	France	Ophélie-Cyrielle Étienne (1:58.43); Margaux Farrell (2:00.06); Mylène Lazare (1:58.82); Camille Muffat (1:55.57)	7:52.88	Q
6	2	5	China	Zhu Qianwei (1:59.23); Liu Jing (1:58.00); Chen Qian (1:58.17); Pang Jiaying (1:58.26)	7:53.66	Q
7	1	6	Great Britain	Caitlin McClatchey (1:58.22); Rebecca Turner (1:57.87); Ellie Faulkner (1:59.36); Joanne Jackson (1:58.86)	7:54.31	Q
8	1	2	Japan	Haruka Ueda (1:57.70); Hanae Ito (1:58.12); Yayoi Matsumoto (1:59.67); Aya Takano (1:59.07)	7:54.56	Q
9	2	3	Hungary	Ágnes Mutina (2:00.06); Zsuzsanna Jakabos (1:57.59); Katinka Hosszú (1:57.84); Evelyn Verrasztó (1:59.09)	7:54.58	
10	1	1	Spain	Melania Costa Schmid (1:57.66); Patricia Castro (1:58.09); Lydia Morant (1:59.66); Mireia Belmonte García (1:59.18)	7:54.59	NR
11	2	2	New Zealand	Natasha Hind (1:58.79); Samantha Lucie-Smith (1:58.89); Amaka Gessler (1:59.03); Melissa Ingram (1:59.21)	7:55.92	NR
12	1	7	Russia	Mariya Baklakova (2:00.75); Elena Sokolova (1:58.33); Veronika Popova (1:58.48); Daria Belyakina (1:58.94)	7:56.50	
13	2	7	Germany	Silke Lippok (1:58.43); Theresa Michalak (2:00.65); Annika Bruhn (1:59.61); Daniela Schreiber (2:00.24)	7:58.93	
14	2	1	Slovenia	Sara Isaković (1:59.58); Anja Klinar (2:00.53); Urša Bežan (2:01.92); Mojca Sagmeister (2:02.66)	8:04.69	
15	1	8	Ukraine	Daryna Zevina (1:59.68); Ganna Dzerkal (2:04.68); Darya Stepanyuk (2:05.49); Iryna Glavnyk (2:02.82)	8:12.67	
16	2	8	Poland	Katarzyna Wilk (2:05.46); Karolina Szczepaniak (2:02.99); Diana Sokołowska (2:01.45); Alexandra Putra (2:03.86)	8:13.76	

=== Final ===
Rank	Lane	Nation	Swimmers	Time	Time Behind	Notes
1st place, gold medalist(s)	5	United States	Missy Franklin (1:55.96); Dana Vollmer (1:56.02); Shannon Vreeland (1:56.85); Allison Schmitt (1:54.09)	7:42.92		OR
2nd place, silver medalist(s)	4	Australia	Bronte Barratt (1:55.76); Melanie Schlanger (1:55.62); Kylie Palmer (1:56.91); Alicia Coutts (1:56.12)	7:44.41	1.49	
3rd place, bronze medalist(s)	2	France	Camille Muffat (1:55.51); Charlotte Bonnet (1:57.78); Ophélie-Cyrielle Étienne (1:58.05); Coralie Balmy (1:56.15)	7:47.49	4.57	NR
4	3	Canada	Barbara Jardin (1:57.96); Samantha Cheverton (1:56.91); Amanda Reason (1:59.32); Brittany MacLean (1:56.46)	7:50.65	7.73	
5	1	Great Britain	Caitlin McClatchey (1:58.66); Rebecca Turner (1:57.39); Hannah Miley (1:58.12); Joanne Jackson (1:58.20)	7:52.37	9.45	
6	7	China	Wang Shijia (1:58.32); Ye Shiwen (1:57.37); Liu Jing (1:59.51); Tang Yi (1:57.91)	7:53.11	10.19	
7	6	Italy	Alice Mizzau (1:58.93); Alice Nesti (2:00.03); Diletta Carli (1:59.73); Federica Pellegrini (1:57.61)	7:56.30	13.38	
8	8	Japan	Haruka Ueda (1:58.23); Hanae Ito (1:58.26); Yayoi Matsumoto (2:00.82); Aya Takano (1:59.42)	7:56.73	13.81	
