= Kareena Lee =

Australian swimmer (born 1993)

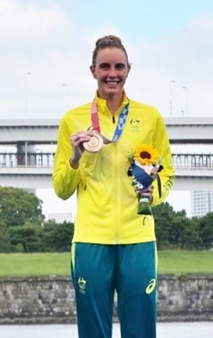
- Lee in 2021

Personal information
- Nationality: Australian
- Born: 16 December 1993 (age 32)

Sport
- Sport: Swimming
- Strokes: Distance freestyle
- Club: Noosa Aquatic Centre
Medal record
Women's swimming
Representing Australia
Olympic Games
Bronze medal – third place	2020 Tokyo	10 km open water
Pan Pacific Championships
Silver medal – second place	2018 Tokyo	10 km open water

Kareena Lee (born 16 December 1993) is an Australian swimmer, specialising in open water events. At the 2020 Olympic Games in Tokyo, she won the bronze medal in the 10 km event.

== Career ==
At the 2015 World Championships, Lee finished 20th in the 10 km, outside the top-10 finish required to qualify for the 2016 Olympic Games. She collapsed upon completing the race, and was hospitalised for asthma, dehydration and hypothermia. Lee subsequently withdrew from the 25 km event.

At the 2018 Pan Pacific Championships, Lee won the silver medal in the 10 km.

At the 2019 World Championships, Lee finished 7th in the 10 km, qualifying for the Olympics after falling short 4 years earlier.

At the 2020 Olympic Games, the race’s conclusion saw Lee and 2016 Olympic champion Sharon van Rouwendaal come down to a sprint finish for the silver medal. Lee won the bronze medal, becoming the first Australian to win an Olympic medal in marathon swimming.

== Awards and honours ==
Swimming Australia Open Water Program Swimmer of the Year: 2018, 2019 & 2021
