= 2018 Pan Pacific Swimming Championships – Women's 10 kilometre open water =

Women's 10 kilometre open water at the 2018 Pan Pacific Swimming Championships
- Venue: Hojyo Beach
- Dates: 14 August
- Competitors: 16 from 7 nations
- Winning time: 2:08:24.8

Medalists
gold medal	Haley Anderson	United States
silver medal	Kareena Lee	Australia
bronze medal	Ana Marcela Cunha	Brazil

The women's 10 kilometre open water competition of the 2018 Pan Pacific Swimming Championships was held on 14 August at the Hojyo Beach.

== Results ==
The race was started at 07:05.

Unlimited number of swimmers are permitted per country, but only the top two swimmers from each country was classified.

Rank	Name	Nationality	Time
1st place, gold medalist(s)	Haley Anderson	United States	2:08:24.8
2nd place, silver medalist(s)	Kareena Lee	Australia	2:08:26.0
3rd place, bronze medalist(s)	Ana Marcela Cunha	Brazil	2:08:27.0
4	Ashley Twichell	United States	2:08:29.6
–	Hannah Moore	United States	2:08:33.5
5	Yukimi Moriyama	Japan	2:08:33.5
6	Yumi Kida	Japan	2:08:38.3
–	Erica Sullivan	United States	2:08:43.5
–	Chase Travis	United States	2:08:44.6
7	Chelsea Gubecka	Australia	2:08:52.5
8	Stephanie Horner	Canada	2:10:59.9
9	Charlotte Webby	New Zealand	2:11:31.8
10	Kate Sanderson	Canada	2:12:16.8
11	Viviane Jungblut	Brazil	2:13:57.9
12	Nicole Oliva	Philippines	2:15:21.3
–	Mackenzie Padington	Canada	DNS
