= Margaux Farrell =

American-born French swimmer (born 1990)

Personal information
- Full name: Margaux Isabelle Farrell
- National team: France
- Born: August 22, 1990 (age 36) Glen Rock, New Jersey, U.S.
- Height: 6 ft 0 in (1.83 m)
- Weight: 156 lb (71 kg)

Sport
- Sport: Swimming
- Strokes: Freestyle
- Club: CN Antibes
- College team: Indiana University
Medal record
Women's swimming
Representing France
Olympic Games
Bronze medal – third place	2012 London	4×200 m freestyle

Margaux Isabelle Farrell (born August 22, 1990) is an American-born swimmer who has represented France in international competition, and who won a bronze medal at the 2012 Summer Olympics.

She also holds four university school records, consisting of the 100, 200, and 500 freestyle, as well as the 100 backstroke.

She graduated Indiana University in 2012 and completed a master's degree in journalism from the University of Southern California in 2015.
