= Haley Anderson =

American swimmer (born 1991)

Personal information
- Full name: Haley Danita Anderson
- National team: United States
- Born: November 20, 1991 (age 34) Santa Clara, California, U.S.
- Height: 5 ft 10 in (178 cm)
- Weight: 150 lb (68 kg)

Sport
- Sport: Swimming
- Strokes: Freestyle
- Club: Sierra Marlins Swim Team; Trojan Swim Club
- College team: University of Southern California
- Coach: Jeff Pearson (Sierra Marlins); Dave Salo (USC)
Medal record
Women's swimming
Representing the United States
Olympic Games
Silver medal – second place	2012 London	10 km marathon
World Championships
Gold medal – first place	2013 Barcelona	5 km open water
Gold medal – first place	2015 Kazan	5 km open water
Silver medal – second place	2017 Budapest	Team event
Silver medal – second place	2019 Gwangju	10 km open water
Bronze medal – third place	2019 Gwangju	Team event
Pan Pacific Championships
Gold medal – first place	2014 Gold Coast	10 km open water
Gold medal – first place	2018 Tokyo	10 km open water
Summer Universiade
Gold medal – first place	2011 Shenzhen	1500 m freestyle
Silver medal – second place	2011 Shenzhen	800 m freestyle

Haley Danita Anderson (born November 20, 1991) is an American competitive swimmer, who competed for the University of Southern California, and is an Olympic silver medalist. She placed second in the 10-kilometer open water event at the 2012 Summer Olympics, and later competed in the event in the 2016, and 2020 Olympics.

== Early life ==
Anderson was born November 20, 1991 in Santa Clara, California to mother Colette, a former collegiate swimmer, and father Randy Anderson. She attended Granite Bay High School in greater Sacramento, graduating in 2009. By the age of six, Anderson, and her one-year older sister Alyssa swam for a recreational swim program at a Livermore, California club coached by Dianne Masluk. Anderson's sister Jordan also competed in swimming. During her later high school years, Haley swam for the strong program at the Sierra Marlins Swim Club in Folsom, California under Marlins Coach one-time CEO and Jeff Pearson. Coach Pearson was a supporter of distance and open water swimming, provided open water training for a few of his Marlin swimmers, and participated in several open water events himself.

Anderson's sister, Alyssa, was an All American swimmer at Arizona. Both sisters competed at the 2009 World Aquatics Championships.

== University of Southern California ==
Anderson attended the University of Southern California, where she swam for the USC Trojans swimming and diving team in National Collegiate Athletic Association (NCAA) competition from the Fall of 2009 to 2013 under Head Coach Dave Salo. Around her Junior years at USC, she captured her first NCAA title in the 500-yard freestyle, with a school record time of 4:34.84 and served as a Co-captain in her Senior year. At USC, she held school records in the 1650, 1000, and 500-yard freestyle events. She received honors as an All American eight times, and captured five titles in her collegiate conference. Anderson also swam with the Trojan Swim Club, associated with USC.

== Swim career ==
At the 2009 Junior Pan Pacific Championships, Anderson placed first in the 800-meter and 1,500-meter freestyle events.

At the 2009 USA Nationals and World Championship Trials, Anderson placed second in the 800-meter freestyle in 8:31.66, earning a place to compete at the 2009 World Aquatics Championships in Rome. At the World Championships, Anderson placed 28th in the 800-meter freestyle (8:45.91) and ninth in the 1,500-meter freestyle (16:20.62).

In June 2012, Anderson qualified for the 2012 Summer Olympics by placing first at the FINA Olympic Marathon Swim Qualifier in Setubal in the 10-kilometer open water event. Anderson later competed at the 2012 United States Olympic Trials in the hopes of also competing in the pool but narrowly missed the team by finishing third in the 800-meter freestyle. She also competed in the 400-meter individual medley and placed eighth in the final.

== 2012 Olympic silver ==
At the 2012 Olympic trials, Anderson placed third in the 800-meter freestyle, just missing being selected for the U.S. team in the event. She qualified for the 10k Open water swim after winning the FINA qualifying event for the Olympic 10k marathon held in Portugal.

Later, at the 2012 Olympics in London, Anderson earned a silver medal by placing second in the 10-kilometer marathon event, with a time of 1:57:38.6 finishing only four-tenths (0.40) of a second behind the winner, Éva Risztov of Hungary, over the 6.2 miles of the event. Swimming at the Serpentine Lake, in London's Hyde Park, Anderson became the first American to win the event, first introduced in Beijing Olympics in 2008. Anderson was not considered a favorite going into the race, and had two pass two competitors at the race's final stretch after the last turn. Her sister Alyssa earned a gold medal at the 2012 Olympics as a member of the winning U.S. team in the 4x200-meter freestyle relay.

Anderson also swam the 10 kilometer marathon event at the 2016 Rio Olympics, placing 5th, and at the 2020 Tokyo Olympics placing 6th with a time of 1:59.36.9.

=== 2013 ===
At the 15th FINA World Championships in Barcelona in 2013, Anderson won the gold medal in the 5-kilometer open water competition.

At the AT&T Winter Nationals located in Federal Way, WA, Anderson won first in both the women's 800-meter freestyle and the women's 200-meter butterfly.

At the 2015 World Championships in Kazan, she retained her 5 km open water title.

In 2019, she won silver in the 10 km open water race at the World Championships.

== Personal bests (long course) ==
Event	Time	Date
800 m freestyle	8:20.51	June 19, 2021

== See also ==
- List of Olympic medalists in swimming (women)
- List of University of Southern California people
- USC Trojans
