= Alyssa Anderson =

American swimmer (born 1990)

Personal information
- Full name: Alyssa Jean Anderson
- National team: United States
- Born: September 30, 1990 (age 35) Santa Clara, California, U.S.
- Height: 5 ft 8 in (173 cm)
- Weight: 141 lb (64 kg)

Sport
- Sport: Swimming
- Strokes: Butterfly, freestyle
- Club: Sierra Marlins Swim Team
- College team: University of Arizona
Medal record
Women's swimming
Representing the United States
Olympic Games
| Gold medal – first place | 2012 London | 4×200 m freestyle |
World Championships (LC)
| Silver medal – second place | 2009 Rome | 4x200 m freestyle |
Summer Universiade
| Gold medal – first place | 2011 Shenzhen | 4x200 m freestyle |

Alyssa Jean Anderson (born September 30, 1990) is an American competition swimmer and Olympic gold medalist who represented the United States at the 2012 Summer Olympics.

== Personal ==
Anderson was born in Santa Clara, California but grew up in Granite Bay. She attended the University of Arizona, where she swam for coach Frank Busch's Arizona Wildcats women's swim team in National Collegiate Athletic Association (NCAA) competition from 2008 to 2012. Anderson's younger sister, Haley, is also a swimmer and competed with her at the 2009 World Aquatics Championships.

== Career ==
At the 2007 Junior Pan Pacific Championships, Anderson won silver medals in the 800-meter and 1,500-meter freestyle.

At the 2009 U.S. Nationals and World Championship Trials, Anderson placed fourth in the 200-meter freestyle, earning a place on the U.S. 4x200-meter freestyle relay team at the 2009 World Aquatics Championships in Rome. In Rome, Anderson swam the third leg of the relay preliminaries and split 1:58.35. The U.S. team advanced to the final and won the silver medal.

At the 2012 United States Olympic Trials in Omaha, Nebraska, the U.S. qualifying meet for the Olympics, Anderson made the U.S. Olympic team for the first time by finishing sixth in the 200-meter freestyle with a time of 1:58.40, which qualified her to swim in the 4x200-meter freestyle as a member of the U.S. relay team. At the 2012 Summer Olympics in London, she swam for the winning U.S. team in the preliminary heats of the women's 4x200-meter freestyle relay and earned a gold medal. Anderson's sister, Haley, won a silver medal in the 10-kilometer open water marathon at the 2012 Olympics.

== Personal bests (long course) ==
| Event | Time | Date |
|---|---|---|
| 200 m freestyle | 1:58.09 | July 2012 |

== See also ==
- Arizona Wildcats
- List of Olympic medalists in swimming (women)
- List of University of Arizona people
- List of World Aquatics Championships medalists in swimming (women)
