= Lauren Perdue =

American swimmer

Personal information
- Nickname: Lo
- National team: United States
- Born: June 25, 1991 (age 35) Charlottesville, Virginia, U.S.
- Home town: Greenville, North Carolina, U.S.
- Height: 5 ft 6 in (168 cm)
- Weight: 143 lb (65 kg)

Sport
- Sport: Swimming
- Strokes: Freestyle
- Club: Greenville Swim Club (NC); University of Virginia Aquatics; SwimMAC Team Elite
- College team: University of Virginia
Medal record
Women's swimming
Representing the United States
Olympic Games
Gold medal – first place	2012 London	4×200 m freestyle

Lauren Perdue (born June 25, 1991) is an American competitive swimmer who specializes in freestyle events. She was a member of the 2012 United States Olympic team, and earned a gold medal as a member of the winning U.S. team in the 4×200-meter freestyle relay at the 2012 Summer Olympics.

Perdue was born in Charlottesville, Virginia, and attended J. H. Rose High School in Greenville, North Carolina. She swam for the Greenville Swim Club under head coach Casey Charles from 1999 to 2009. At the 2009 USA Swimming Long Course Junior National Championships, Perdue won her first championship in the 200-meter freestyle (1:59.09).

Perdue attended the University of Virginia, and swam for the Virginia Cavaliers swimming and diving team in National Collegiate Athletic Association (NCAA) competition from 2009 to 2012. As a Cavalier swimmer, she won nineteen Atlantic Coast Conference (ACC) championships, received sixteen All-American honors, and was named the ACC Swimmer of the Year and ACC Swimmer of the Championships in 2010, 2011, and 2013. Lauren broke her back in 2012 and underwent back surgery only 3 months before the 2012 U.S. Olympic Trials.

At the 2012 United States Olympic Trials in Omaha, Nebraska, the U.S. qualifying event for the Olympics, Perdue finished fourth place in the 200-meter freestyle, and earned a spot on the U.S. relay team in the 4×200-meter freestyle event as a result. At the 2012 Summer Olympics in London, she earned a gold medal by swimming for the winning U.S. team in the preliminary heats of the 4×200-meter freestyle relay.

== See also ==
- List of Olympic medalists in swimming (women)
- List of University of Virginia people
