= Zhu Qianwei =

Chinese swimmer (born 1990)

Personal information
- Born: September 28, 1990 (age 35) Shanghai, China

Sport
- Sport: Swimming
Medal record
Representing China
Olympic Games
Silver medal – second place	2008 Beijing	4×200 m freestyle
World Championships (LC)
Gold medal – first place	2009 Rome	4×200 m freestyle
Bronze medal – third place	2011 Shanghai	4×200 m freestyle
World Championships (SC)
Gold medal – first place	2010 Dubai	4×200 m freestyle
Bronze medal – third place	2010 Dubai	4×100 m freestyle
Summer Universiade
Bronze medal – third place	2011 Shenzhen	4×100 m freestyle
Bronze medal – third place	2011 Shenzhen	4×200 m freestyle

Zhu Qianwei (Chinese: 朱倩蔚; pinyin: Zhū Qiànwèi; born September 18, 1990 in Shanghai) is a Chinese swimmer, who competed for Team China at the 2008 Summer Olympics.

== Major achievements ==
- 2008 China Open - 1st 200m free

== See also ==
- China at the 2012 Summer Olympics - Swimming
