= Mylène Lazare =

French swimmer

Personal information
- Full name: Mylène Claude Marie Catherine Lazare
- Born: 20 November 1987 (age 38) Lagny-sur-Marne, France
- Height: 1.83 m (6 ft 0 in)
- Weight: 75 kg (165 lb)

Sport
- Country: France
- Sport: Swimming
Medal record
Women's swimming
Representing France
Olympic Games
Bronze medal – third place	2012 London	4×200 m freestyle
World Championships (LC)
Bronze medal – third place	2013 Barcelona	4×200 m freestyle
FINA Short Course Worlds
Bronze medal – third place	2010 Dubai	4×200 m freestyle
European Aquatics Championships
Gold medal – first place	2008 Eindhoven	4×200 m freestyle

Mylène Claude Marie Catherine Lazare (born 20 November 1987 in Lagny-sur-Marne) is a French swimmer, who won a bronze medal at the 2012 Summer Olympics in the women's 4 × 200 m freestyle.
