= Chen Qian (swimmer) =

Chinese swimmer

Personal information
- Nationality: China
- Born: April 16, 1993 (age 33)
- Height: 1.73 m (5 ft 8 in)

Sport
- Sport: Swimming
- Strokes: Freestyle
Medal record
World Championships (LC)
Bronze medal – third place	2011 Shanghai	4×200 m freestyle
World Championships (SC)
Gold medal – first place	2010 Dubia	4×200m freestyle

Chen Qian (born April 16, 1993) is a Chinese swimmer.
