= Jade Neilsen =

Australian swimmer

Personal information
- National team: Australia
- Born: 24 July 1991 (age 35) Southport, Queensland
- Height: 175 cm (5 ft 9 in)
- Weight: 70 kg (154 lb)

Sport
- Sport: Swimming
- Strokes: Freestyle
Medal record
Women's swimming
Representing Australia
Olympic Games
Silver medal – second place	2012 London	4×200 m freestyle

Jade Neilsen (born 24 July 1991) is an Australian competitive swimmer. She was selected to represent Australia at the 2012 Summer Olympics in the 4×200-metre freestyle relay event.

== Personal life ==
Neilsen was born on 24 July 1991 in Southport, Queensland.

Her uncle, Paul Neilsen, is a surfer and was 1971 world champion in the sport. Other sports she is involved with include surf lifesaving, winning the swim and board rescue event at the 2006 age Australian Championship.

In 2012, she was attending Bond University where she was pursuing a degree in sports management. She lives in Surfers Paradise, Queensland.

== Swimming ==
Neilsen gained a scholarship with the Queensland Academy of Sport.

Neilsen competed in the 2008 Youth Commonwealth Games in the 200-metre freestyle event where she came in first. She also competed in the 4×200-metre freestyle relay event where she finished second. She competed in the 4×200-metre freestyle event at the Dubai hosted 2010 World Short Course Championships. Her team came in second with a time of 7:37.57. At the Samoa-hosted 2010 Oceania Championships, she earned one silver medal and three gold medals. She competed in the 2011 Australian Championships in the 200-metre freestyle where she finished third. She competed in the 2011 World Swimming Championships. At the 2012 Adelaide National Championships in the 200-metre freestyle event, she finished fifth, which earned her a place in the 4×200-metre freestyle relay team. She was selected to represent Australia at the 2012 Summer Olympics in swimming in the 4×200-metre freestyle event. The Games were her first. She was used in the heat of the 4 x 200 m event, and was awarded a silver medal when the team finished in second place in the final.
