= July 2010 in sports =

<<	July 2010					>>
Su	Mo	Tu	We	Th	Fr	Sa
				1	2	3
4	5	6	7	8	9	10
11	12	13	14	15	16	17
18	19	20	21	22	23	24
25	26	27	28	29	30	31
Sports

This list shows notable sports-related deaths, events, and notable outcomes that occurred in July of 2010.

== Deaths in July ==
- 1: Don Coryell
- 13: George Steinbrenner
- 24: Alex Higgins

== Sporting seasons ==
=== Australian rules football 2010 ===
- Australian Football League

=== Auto racing 2010 ===
- Formula One
- Sprint Cup
- IRL IndyCar Series
- World Rally Championship
- Formula Two
- Nationwide Series
- Camping World Truck Series
- GP2 Series
- GP3 Series
- WTTC
- V8 Supercar
- American Le Mans
- Le Mans Series
- Superleague Formula
- Rolex Sports Car Series
- FIA GT1 World Championship
- Formula Three
- Auto GP
- World Series by Renault
- Deutsche Tourenwagen Masters
- Super GT

=== Baseball 2010 ===
- Major League Baseball
- Nippon Professional Baseball

=== Basketball 2010 ===
- WNBA
- Philippines:
  - Professional: Fiesta Conference
  - Collegiate/high school: NCAA, UAAP

=== Canadian football 2010 ===
- Canadian Football League

=== Cricket 2010 ===
- England:
  - County Championship
  - Clydesdale Bank 40
  - Friends Provident t20

=== Association football 2010 ===
National teams competitions

- FIFA U-20 Women's World Cup
- 2011 FIFA Women's World Cup qualification (UEFA)
- 2011 UEFA European Under-21 Championship qualification

International clubs competitions

- UEFA (Europe) Champions League
- Europa League
- AFC (Asia) Champions League
- AFC Cup
- CAF (Africa) Champions League
- CAF Confederation Cup
- CONCACAF (North & Central America) Champions League

Domestic (national) competitions

- Brazil
- Japan
- Norway
- Russia
- Major League Soccer (USA & Canada)
- Women's Professional Soccer (USA)

=== Golf 2010 ===
- PGA Tour
- European Tour
- LPGA Tour
- Champions Tour

=== Lacrosse 2010 ===
- Major League Lacrosse

=== Motorcycle racing 2010 ===
- Moto GP
- Superbike World Championship
- Supersport racing

=== Rugby league 2010 ===
- Super League
- NRL

=== Rugby union 2010 ===
- 2011 Rugby World Cup qualifying
- Currie Cup
- ITM Cup

=== Snooker ===
- Players Tour Championship

== Days of the month ==
=== July 31, 2010 (Saturday) ===
==== Athletics ====
- European Championships in Barcelona, Spain:
  - Men:
    - 800m: (gold) Marcin Lewandowski (POL) 1:47.07 (silver) Michael Rimmer (GBR) 1:47.17 (bronze) Adam Kszczot (POL) 1:47.22
    - 5000m: (gold) Mo Farah (GBR) 13:31.18 (silver) Jesús España (ESP) 13:33.12 (bronze) Hayle Ibrahimov (AZE) 13:34.15
      - Farah becomes the fifth winner of the 5000m and 10,000m double at the European Championships.
    - 400m hurdles: (gold) David Greene (GBR) 48.12 (silver) Rhys Williams (GBR) 48.96 (bronze) Stanislav Melnykov (UKR) 49.09
    - Javelin throw: (gold) Andreas Thorkildsen (NOR) 88.37 m (silver) Matthias de Zordo (GER) 87.81 m (bronze) Tero Pitkämäki (FIN) 86.67 m
    - Pole vault: (gold) Renaud Lavillenie (FRA) 5.85 m (silver) Maksym Mazuryk (UKR) 5.80 m (bronze) Przemysław Czerwiński (POL) 5.75 m
    - Shot put: (gold) Andrei Mikhnevich (BLR) 21.01 m (silver) Tomasz Majewski (POL) 21.00 m (bronze) Ralf Bartels (GER) 20.93 m
  - Women:
    - Marathon: (gold) Živilė Balčiūnaitė (LIT) 2:31:14 (silver) Nailiya Yulamanova (RUS) 2:32:15 (bronze) Anna Incerti (ITA) 2:32:48
    - 200m: (gold) Myriam Soumaré (FRA) 22.32 (silver) Yelizaveta Bryzhina (UKR) 22.44 (bronze) Aleksandra Fedoriva (RUS) 22.44
    - 100m hurdles: (gold) Nevin Yanıt (TUR) 12.63 (silver) Derval O'Rourke (IRL) 12.65 (bronze) Carolin Nytra (GER) 12.68
    - Triple jump: (gold) Olha Saladukha (UKR) 14.81 m (silver) Simona La Mantia (ITA) 14.56 m (bronze) Svetlana Bolshakova (BEL) 14.55 m
    - Heptathlon: (gold) Jessica Ennis (GBR) 6823 points (silver) Nataliya Dobrynska (UKR) 6778 (bronze) Jennifer Oeser (GER) 6683
- African Championships in Nairobi, Kenya:
  - Men:
    - 110m hurdles: (gold) Othman Hadj Lazib (ALG) 13.77 (silver) Selim Nurudeen (NGR) 13.83 (bronze) Ruan de Vries (RSA) 13.98
    - Hammer throw: (gold) Mohsen Mohamed Anani (EGY) 74.72 m (silver) Chris Harmse (RSA) 72.56 m (bronze) Mostafa Al-Gamel (EGY) 71.40 m
    - Pole vault: (gold) Hamdi Dhouibi (TUN) 4.70 m (silver) Larbi Bourrada (ALG) 4.60 m (bronze) Mourad Souissi (ALG) 4.40 m
    - Triple jump: (gold) Oke Tosin (NGR) 17.22 m (silver) Hugo Mamba-Schlick (CMR) 16.78 m (bronze) Tumelo Thagane (RSA) 16.64 m
  - Women:
    - 10,000m: (gold) Tirunesh Dibaba (ETH) 31:51.39 (silver) Meselech Melkamu (ETH) 31:55.50 (bronze) Linet Masai (KEN) 31:59.36
    - Javelin throw: (gold) Sunette Viljoen (RSA) 63.33 m (silver) Justine Robbeson (RSA) 60.24 m (bronze) Hana'a Hassan Omar (EGY) 55.14 m
    - Heptathlon: (gold) Margaret Simpson (GHA) 6031 points (silver) Janet Wienand (RSA) 5500 (bronze) Selloane Tsoaeli (LES) 5302

==== Auto racing ====
- Nationwide Series:
  - U.S. Cellular 250 in Newton, Iowa: (1) (Nevada) Kyle Busch (Toyota; Joe Gibbs Racing) (2) (California) Kevin Harvick (Chevrolet; Kevin Harvick Inc.) (3) (California) Jason Leffler (Toyota; Braun Racing)
    - Drivers' championship standings (after 21 of 35 races): (1) (Michigan) Brad Keselowski (Dodge; Penske Racing) 3349 points (2) (Missouri) Carl Edwards (Ford; Roush Fenway Racing) 3118 (3) Busch 2876
- World Rally Championship:
  - Rally Finland in Jyväskylä: (1) Jari-Matti Latvala (FIN) / Miikka Anttila (FIN) (Ford Focus RS WRC 09) (2) Sébastien Ogier (FRA) / Julien Ingrassia (FRA) (Citroën C4 WRC) (3) Sébastien Loeb (FRA) / Daniel Elena (MON) (Citroën C4 WRC)
    - Drivers' championship standings (after 8 of 13 rounds): (1) Loeb 166 points (2) Ogier 118 (3) Latvala 105

==== Baseball ====
- European Championship in Germany:
  - Pool C: (teams in **bold** advance to the final)
    - **Netherlands** 3–11 **Italy**
    - France 5–14 Greece
    - Germany 8–0 Sweden
      - Final standings: Italy, Netherlands 4–1, Germany 3–2, Greece, Sweden 2–3, France 0–5.

==== Basketball ====
- South American Championship in Neiva, Colombia:
  - 7th place playoff: Ecuador 70–88 **Chile**
  - 5th place playoff: **Paraguay** 86–66 Colombia
  - Bronze medal game: Venezuela 70–76 (bronze) **Uruguay**
  - Final: (gold) **Brazil** 87–77 (silver) Argentina
    - Brazil win the title for the 18th time.
- FIBA Europe Under-18 Championship in Lithuania:
  - Semifinals:
    - **Lithuania** 67–66 Serbia
    - Latvia 42–73 **Russia**
  - 5th–8th Semifinals:
    - Greece 55–74 **Poland**
    - **Croatia** 67–61 France
  - 9th place playoff: **Turkey** 74–71 Slovenia
  - 11th place playoff: **Spain** 84–59 Italy
  - Group G:
    - Sweden 49–78 Germany
    - Ukraine 104–63 Bulgaria
      - Standings (after 5 games): Germany 9 points, Ukraine 8, Sweden 7, Bulgaria 6.
      - Bulgaria is relegated to Division B.
- FIBA Europe Under-18 Championship for Women in Slovakia: (teams in **bold** advance to Qualifying Round)
  - Group A:
    - **Serbia** 47–73 **Spain**
    - **Slovakia** 58–51 Hungary
      - Final standings: Spain 6 points, Slovak Republic 5, Serbia 4, Hungary 3.
  - Group B:
    - **Slovenia** 81–76 Belgium
    - **Russia** 72–47 **Sweden**
      - Final standings: Russia, Slovenia, Sweden 5 points, Belgium 3.
  - Group C:
    - **Lithuania** 54–72 **Italy**
    - Latvia 52–59 **Poland**
      - Final standings: Italy 6 points, Lithuania 5, Poland 4, Latvia 3.
  - Group D:
    - Czech Republic 73–74 **France**
    - **Ukraine** 84–74 **Turkey**
      - Final standings: France 6 points, Ukraine 5, Turkey 4, Czech Republic 3.

==== Cricket ====
- Pakistan in England:
  - 1st Test in Nottingham, day 3:
    - England 354 and 262/9d (75.3 overs; Matt Prior 102*); Pakistan 182 (54 overs; James Anderson 5-54) and 15/3 (7 overs). Pakistan require another 420 runs with 7 wickets remaining.

==== Cycling ====
- UCI ProTour:
  - Clásica de San Sebastián: (gold) Luis León Sánchez (ESP) (Caisse d'Epargne) 5h 47' 13" (silver) Alexander Vinokourov (KAZ) (Astana) s.t. (bronze) Carlos Sastre (ESP) (Cervélo TestTeam) s.t.
    - UCI World Rankings (after 18 of 26 events): (1) Alberto Contador (ESP) (Astana) 482 points (2) Joaquim Rodríguez (ESP) (Team Katusha) 428 (3) Cadel Evans (AUS) (BMC Racing Team) 390

==== Extreme sport ====
- X Games XVI in Los Angeles: (USA unless stated)
  - BMX Freestyle Park: (gold) Daniel Dhers (VEN) (silver) Dennis Enarson (bronze) Gary Young
  - Men's Skateboard Street: (gold) Ryan Sheckler (silver) Nyjah Huston (bronze) Ryan Decenzo
  - BMX Freestyle Big Air: (gold) Chad Kagy (silver) Steve McCann (AUS) (bronze) Andy Buckworth (AUS)
  - Rally Car Racing: (gold) Tanner Foust (silver) Brian Deegan (bronze) Antoine L'Estage (CAN) and Andrew Comrie-Picard (CAN)
  - Rally Car SuperRally: (gold) Foust (silver) Deegan (bronze) Samuel Hübinette (SWE)
  - Skateboard Big Air Rail Jam: (gold) Bob Burnquist (BRA) (silver) Rob Lorifice (bronze) Elliot Sloan

==== Field hockey ====
- Men's Hockey Champions Trophy in Mönchengladbach, Germany:
  - Germany 4–2 England
  - Australia 9–1 New Zealand
  - Netherlands 5–2 Spain

==== Football (soccer) ====
- CAF Champions League group stage, matchday 2:
  - Group A: Espérance ST (Tunisia) 1–0 (Zimbabwe) Dynamos
    - Standings: (Tunisia) Espérance ST 6 points (2 matches), (Democratic Republic of the Congo) TP Mazembe 3 (1), (Algeria) ES Sétif 0 (1), Dynamos 0 (2).
  - Group B: JS Kabylie (Algeria) 1–0 (Nigeria) Heartland
    - Standings: JS Kabylie 6 points (2 matches), (Egypt) Al-Ahly 1 (1), Heartland 1 (2), (Egypt) Ismaily 0 (1).
- CAF Confederation Cup Play-off for group stage, second leg: (first leg score in parentheses)
  - **ASFAN** (Niger) 2–1 (2–2) (Sudan) Al-Merreikh. ASFAN win 4–3 on aggregate.
  - Primeiro de Agosto (Angola) 2–1 (0–2) (Libya) **Ittihad**. Ittihad win 3–2 on aggregate.
  - **Haras El Hodood** (Egypt) 8–1 (0–1) (Botswana) Gaborone United. Haras El Hodood win 8–2 on aggregate.
  - CR Belouizdad (Algeria) 1–1 (0–0) (Mali) **Djoliba**. 1–1 on aggregate; Djoliba win on away goals rule.

==== Golf ====
- Women's majors:
  - Ricoh Women's British Open in Southport, England:
    - Leaderboard after third round: (1) Yani Tseng (TWN) 204 (–12) (2) Katherine Hull (AUS) 208 (3) In-Kyung Kim (KOR) 210
- Senior majors:
  - U.S. Senior Open in Sammamish, Washington, USA:
    - Leaderboard after third round: (T1) Fred Couples (USA) & Bernhard Langer (DEU) 205 (–5) (T3) Tom Kite (USA) & Lu Chien-Soon (TWN) 210

==== Rugby union ====
- Tri Nations Series:
  - Australia 28–49 New Zealand in Melbourne
    - Standings: New Zealand 15 points (3 matches), Australia 4 (2), South Africa 0 (3).

==== Shooting ====
- ISSF World Championships in Munich, Germany:
  - 10m Air Rifle Men: (gold) Nicolo Campriani (ITA) 702.5 points (silver) Péter Sidi (HUN) 700.4 (bronze) Gagan Narang (IND) 699
  - 10m Air Rifle Men Team: (gold) China 1787 points (silver) Russia 1787 (bronze) Italy 1782
  - 10m Air Rifle Men Junior: (gold) Sergiy Kasper (UKR) 595 points (silver) Serhiy Kulish (UKR) 594 (bronze) Alexander Dryagin (RUS) 593
  - 10m Air Rifle Men Junior Team: (gold) China 1774 points (silver) Ukraine 1772 (bronze) Russia 1771
  - Trap Women: (gold) Zuzana Štefečeková (SVK) 91 points (silver) Liu Yingzi (CHN) 89 (bronze) Jessica Rossi (ITA) 87^{+3}
  - Trap Women Team: (gold) Italy 211 points (silver) China 209 (bronze) San Marino 207
  - Trap Women Junior: (gold) Miranda Wilder (USA) 69 points^{+10} (silver) Catherine Skinner (AUS) 69^{+9} (bronze) Rachael Lynn Heiden (USA) 68^{+1}
  - Trap Women Junior Team: (gold) China 202 points (silver) Australia 194 (bronze) United States 194
  - 50m Pistol Men Team: (gold) South Korea 1686 points (silver) China 1681 (bronze) Spain 1680

==== Water polo ====
- FINA Men's World Cup in Oradea, Romania:
  - 5th–8th Semifinals:
    - **Australia** 10–6 China
    - **Romania** 24–6 Iran
  - Semifinals:
    - United States 9–11 **Croatia**
    - **Serbia** 12–10 Spain

=== July 30, 2010 (Friday) ===
==== Athletics ====
- European Championships in Barcelona, Spain:
  - Men:
    - 200m: (gold) Christophe Lemaitre (FRA) 20.37 (silver) Christian Malcolm (GBR) 20.38 (bronze) Martial Mbandjock (FRA) 20.42
    - 400m: (gold) Kevin Borlée (BEL) 45.08 (silver) Michael Bingham (GBR) 45.23 (bronze) Martyn Rooney (GBR) 45.23
    - 1500m: (gold) Arturo Casado (ESP) 3:42.74 (silver) Carsten Schlangen (GER) 3:43.52 (bronze) Manuel Olmedo (ESP) 3:43.54
    - 110m hurdles: (gold) Andy Turner (GBR) 13.28 (silver) Garfield Darien (FRA) 13.34 (bronze) Dániel Kiss (HUN) 13.39
    - 50km walk: (gold) Yohann Diniz (FRA) 3:40:37 (silver) Grzegorz Sudoł (POL) 3:42:24 (bronze) Sergey Bakulin (RUS) 3:43:26
  - Women:
    - 400m: (gold) Tatyana Firova (RUS) 49.89 (silver) Kseniya Ustalova (RUS) 49.92 (bronze) Antonina Krivoshapka (RUS) 50.10
    - 800m: (gold) Mariya Savinova (RUS) 1:58.22 (silver) Yvonne Hak (NED) 1:58.85 (bronze) Jenny Meadows (GBR) 1:59.39
    - 400m hurdles: (gold) Natalya Antyukh (RUS) 52.92 (silver) Vania Stambolova (BUL) 53.82 (bronze) Perri Shakes-Drayton (GBR) 54.18
    - 3000m steeplechase: (gold) Yuliya Zarudneva (RUS) 9:17.57 (silver) Marta Domínguez (ESP) 9:17.74 (bronze) Lyubov Kharlamova (RUS) 9:29.82
    - Hammer throw: (gold) Betty Heidler (GER) 76.38 m (silver) Tatyana Lysenko (RUS) 75.65 m (bronze) Anita Włodarczyk (POL) 73.56 m
    - Pole vault: (gold) Svetlana Feofanova (RUS) 4.75 m (silver) Silke Spiegelburg (GER) 4.65 m (bronze) Lisa Ryzih (GER) 4.65 m
- African Championships in Nairobi, Kenya:
  - Men:
    - 400m: (gold) Mohamed Khouaja (LBA) 44.98 (silver) Rabah Yousif (SUD) 45.18 (bronze) Gary Kikaya (COD) 45.28
    - 800m: (gold) David Rudisha (KEN) 1:42.84 (silver) Alfred Kirwa Yego (KEN) 1:44.85 (bronze) Jackson Kivuva (KEN) 1:45.47
    - 400m hurdles: (gold) L. J. van Zyl (RSA) 48.51 (silver) Cornel Fredericks (RSA) 48.79 (bronze) Mamadou Kassé Hann (SEN) 49.10
    - 3000m steeplechase: (gold) Richard Mateelong (KEN) 8:23.54 (silver) Ezekiel Kemboi (KEN) 8:26.13 (bronze) Roba Gary Chubeta (ETH) 8:27.15
  - Women:
    - 400m: (gold) Amantle Montsho (BOT) 50.03 (silver) Amy Mbacké Thiam (SEN) 51.32 (bronze) Shade Abugan (NGR) 51.63
    - Discus throw: (gold) Elizna Naudé (RSA) 56.74 m (silver) Kazai Suzanne Kragbe (CIV) 55.53 m (bronze) Sarah Hasseib Dardiri (EGY) 46.51 m
    - High jump: (gold) Selloane Tsoaeli (LES) 1.75 m (silver) Lissa Labiche (SEY) 1.70 m (bronze) Cherotich Koech (KEN) 1.55 m
    - Long jump: (gold) Blessing Okagbare (NGR) 6.62 m (silver) Comfort Onyali (NGR) 6.42 m (bronze) Jamaa Chnaik (MAR) 6.30 m

==== Baseball ====
- European Championship in Germany:
  - Pool C: (teams in **bold** advance to the final)
    - Sweden 3–2 France
    - Italy 9–2 France
    - Greece 0–10 **Netherlands**
    - Netherlands 15–0 Sweden
    - Italy 8–6 Germany
      - Standings: Netherlands 4–0, Italy 3–1, Germany, Sweden 2–2, Greece 1–3, France 0–4.
  - 7th place game: **Czech Republic** 8–4 Great Britain

==== Basketball ====
- South American Championship in Neiva, Colombia:
  - 5th–8th semifinals:
    - Ecuador 45–89 **Paraguay**
    - **Colombia** 78–71 Chile
  - Semifinals:
    - Uruguay 73–79 **Argentina**
    - **Brazil** 79–67 Venezuela
- FIBA Europe Under-18 Championship in Lithuania:
  - Quarterfinals:
    - **Russia** 73–68 France
    - **Latvia** 78–56 Croatia
    - **Lithuania** 84–51 Greece
    - **Serbia** 75–57 Poland
  - 9th–12th semifinals:
    - Spain 60–66 **Turkey**
    - Italy 91–96 **Slovenia**
  - Group G:
    - Germany 59–74 Ukraine
    - Bulgaria 73–70 Sweden
      - Standings (after 4 games): Germany 7 points, Sweden, Ukraine 6, Bulgaria 5.
- FIBA Europe Under-18 Championship for Women in Slovakia: (teams in **bold** advance to Qualifying Round)
  - Group A:
    - Slovakia 67–52 Serbia
    - Hungary 40–72 **Spain**
      - Standings (after 2 games): Spain 4 points, Slovak Republic, Serbia 3, Hungary 2.
  - Group B:
    - Slovenia 70–57 Russia
    - Belgium 45–56 **Sweden**
      - Standings (after 2 games): Sweden 4 points, Slovenia, Russia 3, Belgium 2.
  - Group C:
    - Latvia 51–79 **Lithuania**
    - Poland 50–70 **Italy**
      - Standings (after 2 games): Lithuania, Italy 4 points, Poland, Latvia 2.
  - Group D:
    - **Ukraine** 76–75 Czech Republic
    - **Turkey** 55–57 **France**
      - Standings (after 2 games): France 4 points, Turkey, Ukraine 3, Czech Republic 2.

==== Cricket ====
- Pakistan in England:
  - 1st Test in Nottingham, day 2:
    - England 354 (104.1 overs; Eoin Morgan 130); Pakistan 147/9 (50 overs). Pakistan trail by 207 runs with 1 wicket remaining in the 1st innings.
- India in Sri Lanka:
  - 2nd Test in Colombo, day 5:
    - Sri Lanka 642/4d (159.4 overs) and 129/3d (45 overs); India 707 (225.2 overs). **Match drawn; Sri Lanka lead 3-match series 1–0.**

==== Cycling ====
- UCI Women's Road World Cup:
  - Open de Suède Vårgårda, Team Time Trial: (gold) | **Cervélo TestTeam** Charlotte Becker Regina Bruins Iris Slappendel Kirsten Wild (silver) **Team HTC–Columbia Women** Judith Arndt Ellen van Dijk Adrie Visser Linda Villumsen (bronze) **Nederland bloeit** Liesbet De Vocht Loes Gunnewijk Annemiek van Vleuten Marianne Vos

==== Equestrianism ====
- Show jumping:
  - Meydan FEI Nations Cup:
    - 7th competition: FEI Nations Cup of Great Britain in Hickstead (CSIO 5*): (gold) Great Britain (Peter Charles on Murkas Pom D'Ami, William Funnell on Billy Congo, Tina Fletcher on Hallo Sailor, Michael Whitaker on GIG Amai) (silver) Germany (Daniel Deußer on Cabreado S.E., Jörg Naeve on Calado, Philipp Weishaupt on Catoki, Lars Nieberg on Lord Luis) (bronze) United States (Cara Raether on Ublesco, Robert Kraut on Graf Lando, McLain Ward on Rothchild, Rich Fellers on Flexible)
      - Standings (after 7 of 8 competitions): (1) France 48.5 points (2) Great Britain 38.5 (3) United States 37.5

==== Extreme sport ====
- X Games XVI in Los Angeles: (USA unless stated)
  - Women's Skateboard Vert: (gold) Gaby Ponce (silver) Lyn-Z Adams Hawkins (bronze) Karen Jonz (BRA)
  - BMX Freestyle Vert: (gold) Jamie Bestwick (silver) Steve McCann (bronze) Simon Tabron (GBR)
  - Moto X Step Up: (gold) Matt Buyten (silver) Ronnie Renner (bronze) Todd Potter
  - Skateboard Vert: (gold) Pierre-Luc Gagnon (CAN) (silver) Shaun White (bronze) Andy Macdonald
  - Moto X Best Whip: (gold) Potter (silver) Jarryd McNeil (bronze) Jeremy Stenberg
  - Moto X Best Trick: (gold) Cam Sinclair (AUS) (silver) Robbie Maddison (AUS) (bronze) Taka Higashino (JPN)
  - Skateboard Amateurs Vert: (gold) Italo Penarrubia (BRA) (silver) Sam Bosworth (GBR) (bronze) Jono Schwan
  - Skateboard Vert Best Trick: (gold) Gagnon (silver) Colin McKay (CAN) (bronze) Bob Burnquist (BRA)

==== Football (soccer) ====
- UEFA European Under-19 Championship in France:
  - Final: Spain 1–2 **France**
    - France win the under-19 tournament for the second time, and their seventh youth title overall.

==== Golf ====
- Women's majors:
  - Ricoh Women's British Open in Southport, England:
    - Leaderboard after second round: (1) Yani Tseng (TWN) 136 (−8) (T2) Cristie Kerr (USA), Brittany Lincicome (USA) & Amy Yang (KOR) 140
- Senior majors:
  - U.S. Senior Open in Sammamish, Washington, USA:
    - Leaderboard after second round (USA unless indicated): (1) Bernhard Langer (DEU) 137 (–3) (T2) Tommy Armour III, John Cook & J. R. Roth 139

==== Water polo ====
- FINA Men's World Cup in Oradea, Romania:
  - Quarterfinals:
    - Romania 12–14 **United States**
    - Australia 9–12 **Serbia**
    - **Spain** 11–5 China
    - Iran 2–23 **Croatia**

=== July 29, 2010 (Thursday) ===
==== Athletics ====
- European Championships in Barcelona, Spain:
  - Men:
    - High jump: (gold) Aleksandr Shustov (RUS) 2.33 m (silver) Ivan Ukhov (RUS) 2.31 m (bronze) Martyn Bernard (GBR) 2.29 m
    - Triple jump: (gold) Phillips Idowu (GBR) 17.81 m (silver) Marian Oprea (ROM) 17.51 m (bronze) Teddy Tamgho (FRA) 17.45 m
    - Decathlon: (gold) Romain Barras (FRA) 8453 points (silver) Eelco Sintnicolaas (NED) 8436 (bronze) Andrei Krauchanka (BLR) 8370
  - Women:
    - 100m: (gold) Verena Sailer (GER) 11.10 (silver) Véronique Mang (FRA) 11.11 (bronze) Myriam Soumaré (FRA) 11.18
    - Javelin throw: (gold) Linda Stahl (GER) 66.81 m (silver) Christina Obergföll (GER) 65.58 m (bronze) Barbora Špotáková (CZE) 65.36 m
- African Championships in Nairobi, Kenya:
  - Men:
    - 100m: (gold) Ben Youssef Meite (CIV) 10.08 (silver) Aziz Zakari (GHA) 10.12 (bronze) Simon Magakwe (RSA) 10.14
    - Discus throw: (gold) Omar Ahmed El Ghazaly (EGY) 59.30 m (silver) Yasser Ibrahim Farag (EGY) 58.71 m (bronze) Victor Hogan (RSA) 58.11 m
    - Long jump: (gold) Godfrey Khotso Mokoena (RSA) 8.23 m (silver) Ndiss Kaba Badji (SEN) 8.10 m (bronze) Stanley Gbagbeke (NGR) 8.06 m
    - Decathlon: (gold) Larbi Bourrada (ALG) 8148 points (silver) Mourad Souissi (ALG) 7818 (bronze) Guillaume Thierry (MRI) 7100
  - Women:
    - 100m: (gold) Blessing Okagbare (NGR) 11.03 (silver) Ruddy Zang Milama (GAB) 11.15 (bronze) Oludamola Osayomi (NGR) 11.22
    - 5000m: (gold) Vivian Cheruiyot (KEN) 16:18.72 (silver) Meseret Defar (ETH) 16:20.54 (bronze) Sentayehu Ejigu (ETH) 16:22.32
    - 100m hurdles: (gold) Seun Adigun (NGR) 13.14 (silver) Gnima Faye (SEN) 13.67 (bronze) Amina Ferguen (ALG) 13.87
    - Pole vault: (gold) Nisrine Dinar (MAR) 3.70 m (silver) Laetitia Berthier (BDI) 3.50 m (bronze) Sinali Alima Outtara (CIV) 3.40 m

==== Baseball ====
- European Championship in Germany: (teams in **bold** advance to the semifinals)
  - Pool B: **Sweden** 3–2 **Italy**
    - Final standings: Italy 4–1, Sweden, **Greece** 3–2, Great Britain, Spain 2–3, Croatia 1–4.
  - Pool C: Germany 17–8 Greece
    - Standings: Netherlands 2–0, Germany 2–1, Italy, Sweden 1–1, Greece 1–2, France 0–2.

==== Cricket ====
- Pakistan in England:
  - 1st Test in Nottingham, day 1:
    - England 331/4 (90 overs; Eoin Morgan 125*); Pakistan.
- India in Sri Lanka:
  - 2nd Test in Colombo, day 4:
    - Sri Lanka 642/4d (159.4 overs); India 669/9 (198 overs; Sachin Tendulkar 203, Suresh Raina 120). India lead by 27 runs with 1 wicket remaining in the 1st innings.

==== Extreme sport ====
- X Games XVI in Los Angeles: (USA unless stated)
  - Moto X Super X Adaptive: (gold) Mike Schultz (silver) Todd Thompson (bronze) Beau Meier
  - Men's Moto X Super X: (gold) Josh Grant (silver) Justin Brayton (bronze) Josh Hansen
  - Women's Moto X Super X: (gold) Ashley Fiolek (silver) Tarah Gieger (PUR) (bronze) Sara Price
  - Moto X Freestyle: (gold) Travis Pastrana (silver) Levi Sherwood (NZL) (bronze) Nate Adams
  - Skateboard Big Air: (gold) Jake Brown (AUS) (silver) Bob Burnquist (BRA) (bronze) Rob Lorifice

==== Football (soccer) ====
- 2011 FIFA Women's World Cup qualification (UEFA): (team in **bold** advances to the playoff round, teams in ~~strike~~ are eliminated)
  - Group 5: **England** 3–0 ~~Turkey~~
    - Standings: England 19 points (7 matches), ~~Spain~~ 19 (8), ~~Austria~~ 9 (6), Turkey 6 (7), ~~Malta~~ 0 (8).
- FIFA U-20 Women's World Cup in Germany:
  - Semifinals:
    - **Germany** 5–1 South Korea
    - Colombia 0–1 **Nigeria**
- UEFA Europa League Third qualifying round, first leg:
  - Sibir Novosibirsk (Russia) 1–0 (Cyprus) Apollon
  - Spartak Zlatibor Voda (Serbia) 2–1 (Ukraine) Dnipro Dnipropetrovsk
  - Beroe Stara Zagora (Bulgaria) 1–1 (Austria) Rapid Wien
  - Dnepr Mogilev (Belarus) 1–0 (Czech Republic) Baník Ostrava
  - MYPA (Finland) 1–2 (Romania) Timişoara
  - Inter Turku (Finland) 1–5 (Belgium) Genk
  - Ruch Chorzów (Poland) 1–3 Austria Wien
  - Karpaty Lviv (Ukraine) 1–0 (Georgia (country)) Zestafoni
  - Molde (Norway) 2–3 (Germany) Stuttgart
  - IF Elfsborg (Sweden) 5–0 (North Macedonia) Teteks
  - Utrecht (Netherlands) 1–0 (Switzerland) Luzern
  - Randers (Denmark) 2–3 (Switzerland) Lausanne-Sport
  - Aalesunds (Norway) 1–1 (Scotland) Motherwell
  - APOEL (Cyprus) 1–0 (Czech Republic) Jablonec
  - Odense (Denmark) 5–3 (Bosnia and Herzegovina) Zrinjski
  - Kalmar FF (Sweden) 1–1 (Bulgaria) Levski Sofia
  - Maccabi Haifa (Israel) 1–0 (Belarus) Dinamo Minsk
  - Wisła Kraków (Poland) 0–1 (Azerbaijan) Qarabağ
  - Cercle Brugge (Belgium) 1–0 (Cyprus) Anorthosis
  - Dinamo București (Romania) 3–1 (Croatia) Hajduk Split
  - Galatasaray (Turkey) 2–2 (Serbia) OFK Beograd
  - Nordsjælland (Denmark) 0–1 (Portugal) Sporting CP
  - Maribor (Slovenia) 3–0 (Scotland) Hibernian
  - Red Star Belgrade (Serbia) 1–2 (Slovakia) Slovan Bratislava
  - Viktoria Plzeň (Czech Republic) 1–1 (Turkey) Beşiktaş
  - Olympiacos (Greece) 2–1 (Israel) Maccabi Tel Aviv
  - Sturm Graz (Austria) 2–0 (Georgia (country)) Dinamo Tbilisi
  - Győri ETO (Hungary) 0–1 (France) Montpellier
  - Marítimo (Portugal) 8–2 (Wales) Bangor City
  - Shamrock Rovers (Republic of Ireland) 0–2 (Italy) Juventus
  - AZ (Netherlands) 2–0 (Sweden) IFK Göteborg
  - Jagiellonia Białystok (Poland) 1–2 (Greece) Aris
  - Rabotnički (North Macedonia) 0–2 (England) Liverpool
  - Budućnost Podgorica (Montenegro) 1–2 (Denmark) Brøndby
- CONCACAF Champions League preliminary round, first leg:
  - FAS (El Salvador) 1–1 (Guatemala) Xelajú

==== Golf ====
- Women's majors:
  - Ricoh Women's British Open in Southport, England:
    - Leaderboard after first round: (T1) Katherine Hull (AUS) & Yani Tseng (TWN) 68 (−4) (T3) Anne-Lise Caudal (FRA), Brittany Lincicome (USA), Amy Yang (KOR) & Sun Young Yoo (KOR) 69
- Senior majors:
  - U.S. Senior Open in Sammamish, Washington, USA:
    - Leaderboard after first round (all USA): (T1) Bruce Vaughan 66 (–4) (2) Tim Jackson (a) & Loren Roberts 68

==== Volleyball ====
- Central American and Caribbean Games in Mayagüez, Puerto Rico:
  - Bronze medal match: (bronze) **Mexico** 3–2 Dominican Republic
  - Final: (silver) Venezuela 2–3 (gold) **Puerto Rico**

==== Water polo ====
- FINA Men's World Cup in Oradea, Romania:
  - Group A:
    - Romania 8–14 Spain
    - Iran 4–26 Australia
      - Final standings: Spain 6 points, Romania 4, Australia 2, Iran 0.
  - Group B:
    - China 8–15 Serbia
    - United States 7–9 Croatia
      - Final standings: Croatia 6 points, Serbia 4, United States 2, China 0.

=== July 28, 2010 (Wednesday) ===
==== Athletics ====
- European Championships in Barcelona, Spain:
  - Men:
    - Hammer throw: (gold) Libor Charfreitag (SVK) 80.02 m (silver) Nicola Vizzoni (ITA) 79.12 m (bronze) Krisztián Pars (HUN) 79.06 m
    - 100m: (gold) Christophe Lemaitre (FRA) 10.11 (silver) Mark Lewis-Francis (GBR) 10.18 (bronze) Martial Mbandjock (FRA) 10.18
  - Women:
    - 20km walk: (gold) Olga Kaniskina (RUS) 1:27:44 (silver) Anisya Kirdyapkina (RUS) 1:28:55 (bronze) Vera Sokolova (RUS) 1:29:32
    - Discus throw: (gold) Sandra Perković (CRO) 64.67 m (silver) Nicoleta Grasu (ROU) 63.48 m (bronze) Joanna Wiśniewska (POL) 62.37 m
    - Long jump: (gold) Ineta Radēviča (LAT) 6.92 m (silver) Naide Gomes (POR) 6.92 m (bronze) Olga Kucherenko (RUS) 6.84 m
    - 10,000m: (gold) Elvan Abeylegesse (TUR) 31:10.23 (silver) Inga Abitova (RUS) 31:22.83 (bronze) Jéssica Augusto (POR) 31:25.77
- African Championships in Nairobi, Kenya:
  - Men:
    - 10,000m: (gold) Wilson Kiprop (KEN) 27:32.91 (silver) Moses Ndiema Kipsiro (UGA) 27:33.37 (bronze) Geoffrey Mutai (KEN) 27:33.83
    - Shot put: (gold) Burger Lambrechts (RSA) 18.63 m (silver) Roelof Potgieter (RSA) 18.62 m (bronze) Orazio Cremona (RSA) 18.27 m
  - Women:
    - Hammer throw: (gold) Amy Sène (SEN) 64.11 m (silver) Marwa Hussein (EGY) 62.36 m (bronze) Florence Ezeh (TOG) 57.94 m

==== Baseball ====
- European Championship in Germany: (teams in **bold** advance to the semifinals)
  - Pool A: **Netherlands** 3–0 **Germany**
    - Final standings: Netherlands 5–0, Germany 4–1, **France** 3–2, Czech Republic 2–3, Belgium 1–4, Ukraine 0–5.
  - Pool B: Croatia 13–1 **Greece**
    - Standings: **Italy** 4–0, Greece 3–2, Sweden 2–2, Great Britain, Spain 2–3, Croatia 1–4.
  - 11th place game: Ukraine vs. Croatia. Cancelled due to inclement weather, both teams share 11th place.
- Men's Central American and Caribbean Games in Mayagüez, Puerto Rico:
  - Bronze medal game: (bronze) **Nicaragua** 7–6 Puerto Rico
  - Final: (gold) **Dominican Republic** 3–2 (silver) Mexico

==== Basketball ====
- FIBA Europe Under-18 Championship in Lithuania: (teams in **bold** advance to the quarterfinals)
  - Group E:
    - Spain 73–69 Slovenia
    - **Latvia** 75–78 **Lithuania**
    - **Poland** 65–69 **France**
      - Final standings: Lithuania 10 points, Latvia 8, Poland, France, Spain 7, Slovenia 6.
  - Group F:
    - **Croatia** 82–77 Turkey
    - **Serbia** 97–52 Italy
    - **Russia** 69–52 **Greece**
      - Final standings: Russia 9 points, Serbia, Croatia, Greece 8, Italy, Turkey 6.
  - Group G:
    - Ukraine 76–81 Sweden
    - Bulgaria 58–65 Germany
      - Standings (after 3 games): Germany 6 points, Sweden 5, Ukraine 4, Bulgaria 3.
- South American Championship in Neiva, Colombia: (teams in **bold** advance to the semifinals)
  - Group A:
    - **Brazil** 93–81 Paraguay
    - Chile 64–75 **Uruguay**
      - Final standings: Brazil 6 points, Uruguay 5, Paraguay 4, Chile 3.
  - Group B:
    - **Venezuela** 104–43 Ecuador
    - Colombia 63–70 **Argentina**
      - Final standings: Argentina, Venezuela, Colombia 5 points, Ecuador 3.

==== Cricket ====
- India in Sri Lanka:
  - 2nd Test in Colombo, day 3:
    - Sri Lanka 642/4d (159.4 overs); India 382/4 (108 overs; Sachin Tendulkar 108*). India trail by 260 runs with 6 wickets remaining in the 1st innings.
- ICC Intercontinental Cup in Amstelveen, day 4:
  - Zimbabwe XI 298 (89 overs) and 305/5d (70.3 overs); Netherlands 186 (75.5 overs) and 280 (94 overs). **Zimbabwe XI win by 137 runs.**
    - Standings: Scotland 69 points (4 matches), Afghanistan 57 (4), Zimbabwe XI 43 (3), Kenya 43 (5), Netherlands 15 (5), Ireland 12 (3), Canada 9 (4).

==== Football (soccer) ====
- UEFA Champions League Third qualifying round, first leg:
  - Aktobe (Kazakhstan) 1–0 (Israel) Hapoel Tel Aviv
  - BATE (Belarus) 0–0 (Denmark) Copenhagen
  - Sheriff Tiraspol (Moldova) 1–1 (Croatia) Dinamo Zagreb
  - Debrecen (Hungary) 0–2 (Switzerland) Basel
  - Young Boys (Switzerland) 2–2 (Turkey) Fenerbahçe
  - AIK (Sweden) 0–1 (Norway) Rosenborg
  - Partizan (Serbia) 3–0 (Finland) HJK Helsinki
  - Ajax (Netherlands) 1–1 (Greece) PAOK
  - Braga (Portugal) 3–0 (Scotland) Celtic
- Copa Libertadores Semifinals, first leg:
  - Internacional (Brazil) 1–0 (Brazil) São Paulo
- CONCACAF Champions League preliminary round, first leg:
  - Tauro (Panama) 0–3 (Honduras) Marathón
  - Brujas (Costa Rica) 2–2 (Trinidad and Tobago) Joe Public
  - Seattle Sounders FC (United States) 1–0 (El Salvador) Isidro Metapán
- (United States) / (Canada) 2010 MLS All-Star Game in Houston:
  - (England) Manchester United 5, MLS All-Stars 2
    - Federico Macheda, who goes on to earn MVP honors, opens United's scoring 24 seconds in and adds a second early goal as United coast to a lopsided win.
- (Brazil) Copa do Brasil Final, first leg:
  - Santos 2–0 Vitória

==== Volleyball ====
- Central American and Caribbean Games in Mayagüez, Puerto Rico:
  - Classification 5/6: Trinidad and Tobago 2–3 **Panama**
  - Semifinals:
    - **Venezuela** 3–0 Mexico
    - **Puerto Rico** 3–1 Dominican Republic

==== Water polo ====
- FINA Men's World Cup in Oradea, Romania:
  - Group A:
    - Australia 9–11 Romania
    - Iran 1–26 Spain
      - Standings (after 2 matches): Romania, Spain 4 points, Australia, Iran 0.
  - Group B:
    - Croatia 14–4 China
    - United States 9–17 Serbia
      - Standings (after 2 matches): Croatia 4 points, Serbia, United States 2, China 0.

=== July 27, 2010 (Tuesday) ===
==== Athletics ====
- European Championships in Barcelona, Spain:
  - Men:
    - 10,000m: (gold) Mohammed Farah (GBR) 28:24.99 (silver) Chris Thompson (GBR) 28:27.33 (bronze) Daniele Meucci (ITA) 28:27.33
    - 20km walk: (gold) Stanislav Emelyanov (RUS) 1:20:10 (silver) Alex Schwazer (ITA) 1:20:38 (bronze) João Vieira (POR) 1:20:49
  - Women:
    - Shot put: (gold) Nadzeya Astapchuk (BLR) 20.48 m (silver) Natallia Mikhnevich (BLR) 19.53 m (bronze) Anna Avdeyeva (RUS) 19.39 m

==== Baseball ====
- European Championship in Germany: (teams in **bold** advance to the semifinals)
  - Pool A:
    - **France** 8–2 Belgium
    - Ukraine 1–11 Czech Republic
    - Belgium 0–10 **Netherlands**
    - **Germany** 10–9 France
      - Standings: Netherlands, Germany 4–0, France 3–2, Czech Republic 2–3, Belgium 1–4, Ukraine 0–5.
  - Pool B:
    - Spain 16–6 Sweden
    - **Greece** 4–3 Great Britain
    - **Italy** 13–1 Croatia
      - Standings: Italy 4–0, Greece 3–1, Sweden 2–2, Great Britain, Spain 2–3, Croatia 0–4.
- Men's Central American and Caribbean Games in Mayagüez, Puerto Rico:
  - Semifinals:
    - **Dominican Republic** 6–5 Nicaragua
    - Puerto Rico 0–1 **Mexico**

==== Basketball ====
- FIBA Europe Under-18 Championship in Lithuania: (teams in **bold** advance to the quarterfinals)
  - Group E:
    - France 75–51 Slovenia
    - **Lithuania** 77–58 Spain
    - Poland 59–63 **Latvia**
      - Standings (after 4 games): Lithuania 8 points, Latvia 7, Poland 6, France, Spain, Slovenia 5.
  - Group F:
    - Italy 61–72 Croatia
    - **Greece** 79–65 Turkey
    - **Russia** 75–61 Serbia
      - Standings (after 4 games): Russia, Greece 7 points, Serbia, Croatia 6, Italy, Turkey 5.
  - Group G:
    - Bulgaria 75–79 Ukraine
    - Germany 73–66 Sweden
      - Standings (after 2 games): Germany 4 points, Sweden, Ukraine 3, Bulgaria 2.
- South American Championship in Neiva, Colombia:
  - Group A:
    - Chile 72–76 Paraguay
    - Brazil 89–63 Chile
  - Group B:
    - Argentina 107–43 Ecuador
    - Colombia 84–83 (OT) Venezuela

==== Cricket ====
- India in Sri Lanka:
  - 2nd Test in Colombo, day 2:
    - Sri Lanka 642/4d (159.4 overs; Kumar Sangakkara 219, Mahela Jayawardene 174); India 95/0 (18 overs). India trail by 547 runs with 10 wickets remaining in the 1st innings.
- ICC Intercontinental Cup in Amstelveen, day 3:
  - Zimbabwe XI 298 (89 overs) and 305/5d (70.3 overs); Netherlands 186 (75.5 overs) and 134/4 (37.4 overs). Netherlands require another 284 runs with 6 wickets remaining.

==== Football (soccer) ====
- UEFA European Under-19 Championship in France:
  - Semi-finals:
    - **Spain** 3–1 England
    - **France** 2–1 Croatia
- UEFA Champions League Third qualifying round, first leg:
  - Omonia (Cyprus) 1–1 (Austria) Red Bull Salzburg
  - Litex Lovech (Bulgaria) 1–1 (Slovakia) Žilina
  - Dynamo Kyiv (Ukraine) 3–0 (Belgium) Gent
  - Unirea Urziceni (Romania) 0–0 (Russia) Zenit St. Petersburg
  - Sparta Prague (Czech Republic) 1–0 (Poland) Lech Poznań
  - The New Saints (Wales) 1–3 (Belgium) Anderlecht
- UEFA Europa League Third qualifying round, first leg:
  - CSKA Sofia (Bulgaria) 3–0 (Northern Ireland) Cliftonville
- Copa Libertadores Semifinals, first leg:
  - Guadalajara (Mexico) 1–1 Universidad de Chile
- CONCACAF Champions League preliminary round, first leg:
  - Toronto FC (Canada) 1–0 (Honduras) Motagua
  - San Juan Jabloteh (Trinidad and Tobago) 0–1 (Mexico) Santos Laguna
  - Los Angeles Galaxy (United States) 1–4 Puerto Rico Islanders
  - San Francisco (Panama) 2–3 (Mexico) Cruz Azul

==== Volleyball ====
- Central American and Caribbean Games in Mayagüez, Puerto Rico:
  - Quarterfinals:
    - **Dominican Republic** 3–1 Trinidad and Tobago
    - **Mexico** 3–0 Panama

==== Water polo ====
- FINA Men's World Cup in Oradea, Romania:
  - Group A:
    - Iran 1–26 Romania
    - Australia 7–9 Spain
  - Group B:
    - United States 10–6 China
    - Croatia 10–8 Serbia

=== July 26, 2010 (Monday) ===
==== Baseball ====
- Major League Baseball:
  - Facing the minimum 27 batters but surrendering just one walk, Matt Garza of the Tampa Bay Rays hurls the franchise's first – and the 2010 MLB season's fifth – no-hitter as the Rays defeat the Detroit Tigers, 5–0.
- European Championship in Germany:
  - Pool A:
    - Czech Republic 1–7 Netherlands
    - Czech Republic 10–1 Belgium
    - France 10–2 Ukraine
    - Netherlands – Germany postponed
      - Standings: Germany, Netherlands 3–0, France 2–1, Belgium 1–2, Czech Republic 1–3, Ukraine 0–4.
  - Pool B:
    - Great Britain 5–1 Spain
    - Croatia – Greece postponed
    - Sweden – Italy postponed
      - Standings: Italy 3–0, Sweden, Greece 2–1, Great Britain 2–2, Spain 1–3, Croatia 0–3.
- Men's Central American and Caribbean Games in Mayagüez, Puerto Rico:
  - Playoffs:
    - **Nicaragua** 2–0 Venezuela
    - Panama 0–7 **Mexico**

==== Basketball ====
- FIBA Europe Under-18 Championship in Lithuania: (teams in **bold** advance to the quarterfinals)
  - Group E:
    - Slovenia 76–74 Latvia
    - France 63–104 **Lithuania**
    - Spain 67–81 Poland
      - Standings (after 3 games): Lithuania 6 points, Latvia, Poland 5, Spain, Slovenia 4, France 3.
  - Group F:
    - Greece 97–88 Italy
    - Croatia 55–78 Russia
    - Turkey 49–63 Serbia
      - Standings (after 3 games): Serbia, Russia, Greece 5 points, Italy, Croatia, Turkey 4.
  - Group G:
    - Ukraine 59–73 Germany
    - Sweden 88–66 Bulgaria
- South American Championship in Neiva, Colombia:
  - Group A:
    - Uruguay 66–61 Paraguay
    - Brazil 69–54 Chile
  - Group B:
    - Venezuela 75–72 Argentina
    - Colombia 94–46 Ecuador

==== Cricket ====
- India in Sri Lanka:
  - 2nd Test in Colombo, day 1:
    - Sri Lanka 312/2 (90 overs; Kumar Sangakkara 130*, Tharanga Paranavitana 100); India.
- ICC Intercontinental Cup in Amstelveen, day 2:
  - Zimbabwe XI 298 (89 overs) and 79/2 (23 overs); Netherlands 186 (75.5 overs). Zimbabwe XI lead by 191 runs with 8 wickets remaining.

==== Volleyball ====
- Central American and Caribbean Games in Mayagüez, Puerto Rico:
  - Group A: Dominican Republic 0–3 Venezuela
    - Final standings: Venezuela 4 points, Dominican Republic 3, Panama 2.
  - Group B:
    - Barbados 0–3 Trinidad and Tobago
    - Puerto Rico 3–1 Mexico
      - Final standings: Puerto Rico 6 points, Mexico 5, Trinidad and Tobago 4, Barbados 3.

=== July 25, 2010 (Sunday) ===
==== Athletics ====
- World Junior Championships in Moncton, Canada:
  - Men:
    - 800m: (gold) David Mutinda Mutua (KEN) 1:46.41 (silver) Casimir Loxsom (USA) 1:46.57 (bronze) Robby Andrews (USA) 1:47.00
    - 110m hurdles: (gold) Pascal Martinot-Lagarde (FRA) 13.52 (silver) Vladimir Vukicevic (NOR) 13.59 (bronze) Jack Meredith (GBR) 13.59
    - 3000m steeplechase: (gold) Jonathan Muia Ndiku (KEN) 8:23.48 (silver) Albert Kiptoo Yator (KEN) 8:33.55 (bronze) Jacob Araptany (UGA) 8:37.02
    - 4 × 400 m relay: (gold) United States 3:04.76 (silver) Nigeria 3:06.36 (bronze) Jamaica 3:06.49
    - Hammer throw: (gold) Conor McCullough (USA) 80.79 m (silver) Ákos Hudi (HUN) 78.37 m (bronze) Alaa El-Din El-Ashry (EGY) 76.66 m
    - Triple jump: (gold) Aleksey Fyodorov (RUS) 16.68 m (silver) Ernesto Revé (CUB) 16.47 m (bronze) Omar Craddock (USA) 16.23 m
  - Women:
    - 1500m: (gold) Tizita Bogale (ETH) 4:08.06 (silver) Ciara Mageean (IRL) 4:09.51 (bronze) Nancy Chepkwemoi (KEN) 4:11.04
    - 4 × 400 m relay: (gold) United States 3:31.20 (silver) Nigeria 3:31.84 (bronze) Jamaica 3:32.24
    - High jump: (gold) Marija Vukovic (MNE) 1.91 m (silver) Airinė Palšytė (LIT) 1.89 m (bronze) Elena Vallortigara (ITA) 1.89 m

==== Auto racing ====
- Formula One:
  - German Grand Prix in Hockenheim, Germany: (1) Fernando Alonso (ESP) (Ferrari) (2) Felipe Massa (BRA) (Ferrari) (3) Sebastian Vettel (GER) (Red Bull–Renault)
    - Drivers' championship standings (after 11 of 19 races): (1) Lewis Hamilton (GBR) (McLaren–Mercedes) 157 points (2) Jenson Button (GBR) (McLaren-Mercedes) 143 (3) Mark Webber (AUS) (Red Bull-Renault) and Vettel 136
    - Constructors' championship standings: (1) McLaren 300 points (2) Red Bull 272 (3) Ferrari 208
    - After the race, Ferrari receive a US$100,000 fine for breaching sporting regulations, by apparently implementing team orders in relation to Alonso passing Massa for the lead on lap 49. (BBC)
- NASCAR Sprint Cup Series:
  - Brickyard 400 in Speedway, Indiana: (1) (Missouri) Jamie McMurray (Chevrolet; Earnhardt Ganassi Racing) (2) (California) Kevin Harvick (Chevrolet; Richard Childress Racing) (3) (Washington (state)) Greg Biffle (Ford; Roush Fenway Racing)
    - Drivers' championship standings (after 20 of 36 races): (1) Harvick 2920 points (2) (California) Jeff Gordon (Chevrolet; Hendrick Motorsports) 2736 (3) (Virginia) Denny Hamlin (Toyota; Joe Gibbs Racing) 2660
    - McMurray becomes the third driver to win the Daytona 500 and the Brickyard 400 in the same season after Dale Jarrett in 1996 and Jimmie Johnson in 2006.
    - McMurray's team owner Chip Ganassi completes a treble of winning the Daytona 500, the Brickyard 400 and the Indianapolis 500 in the same season.
- IndyCar Series:
  - Honda Indy Edmonton in Edmonton, Canada: (1) Scott Dixon (NZL) (Chip Ganassi Racing) (2) Will Power (AUS) (Team Penske) (3) Dario Franchitti (GBR) (Chip Ganassi Racing)
    - Drivers' championship standings (after 11 of 17 races): (1) Power 420 points (2) Franchitti 370 (3) Dixon 349

==== Baseball ====
- European Championship in Germany:
  - Pool A:
    - Netherlands 12–2 Ukraine
    - Germany 8–4 Belgium
    - France 6–1 Czech Republic
      - Standings: Germany 3–0, Netherlands 2–0, Belgium, France 1–1, Czech Republic, Ukraine 0–3.
  - Pool B:
    - Great Britain 2–12 Italy
    - Sweden 12–2 Croatia
    - Spain 9–13 Greece
      - Standings: Italy 3–0, Sweden, Greece 2–1, Spain 1–2, Great Britain 1–2, Croatia 0–3.
- Men's Central American and Caribbean Games in Mayagüez, Puerto Rico: (teams in **bold** advance to the playoffs)
  - Pool A: U.S. Virgin Islands 0–6 **Puerto Rico**
    - Final standings: Puerto Rico 4–0, **Venezuela** 3–1, **Panama** 2–2, Guatemala 1–3, U.S. Virgin Islands 0–4.
  - Pool B:
    - **Mexico** 3–2 Netherlands Antilles
    - **Dominican Republic** 1–2 Mexico
      - Final standings: Dominican Republic, Mexico, **Nicaragua** 2–1, Netherlands Antilles 0–3.

==== Basketball ====
- FIBA Under-17 World Championship for Women in Rodez and Toulouse, France:
  - 7th place playoff: Spain 48–74 **Australia**
  - 5th place playoff: Russia 68–74 **Japan**
  - Bronze medal game: (bronze) **China** 85–73 Belgium
  - Final: (gold) **United States** 92–62 (silver) France
    - The USA win the inaugural edition of the event.
- FIBA Europe Under-20 Championship for Women in Latvia:
  - Group G:
    - Sweden 80–51 Bulgaria
    - Romania 68–75 Germany
      - Final standings: Romania 11 points, Germany 10, Sweden 9, Bulgaria 6.
      - Sweden and Bulgaria are relegated to Division B.
  - 7th place playoff: Serbia 46–68 **Turkey**
  - 5th place playoff: Lithuania 64–82 **Ukraine**
  - Bronze medal game: France 49–53 (bronze) **Latvia**
  - Final: (gold) **Russia** 75–74 (silver) Spain
    - Russia win the title for the fifth time.

==== Cricket ====
- ICC Intercontinental Cup in Amstelveen, day 1:
  - Zimbabwe XI 298 (89 overs; Craig Ervine 145); Netherlands 7/2 (5 overs). Netherlands trail by 291 runs with 8 wickets remaining in the 1st innings.

==== Cycling ====
- Grand Tours:
  - Tour de France:
    - Stage 20: (gold) Mark Cavendish (GBR) (Team HTC–Columbia) 2h 42' 21" (silver) Alessandro Petacchi (ITA) (Lampre–Farnese) s.t. (bronze) Julian Dean (NZL) (Garmin–Transitions) s.t.
      - Cavendish wins the last stage of the Tour on the Champs-Élysées for the second straight year, the first ever rider to do so.
    - Final general classification: (1) Alberto Contador (ESP) (Astana) 91h 58' 48" (2) Andy Schleck (LUX) (Team Saxo Bank) + 39" (3) Denis Menchov (RUS) (Rabobank) + 2' 01"
      - Contador wins the Tour for the third time in four years, and his fifth Grand Tour title.

==== Darts ====
- PDC Major:
  - World Matchplay, day 9:
    - Final: **Phil Taylor** (ENG) def. Raymond van Barneveld (NED) 18–12
      - Taylor wins his eleventh World Matchplay title and the 58th major title of his PDC career.

==== Equestrianism ====
- Show jumping:
  - FEI World Cup Jumping – North American League, East Coast:
    - 2nd Competition in Bromont, Quebec (CSI**-W): (gold) Yann Candele (CAN) on Game Ready (silver) Ljubov Kochetova (RUS) on Aslan (bronze) Jenna Thompson (CAN) on Zeke
      - Standings (after 1 of 17 competitions): (1) Pablo Barrios (VEN) 30 points (2) Eric Lamaze (CAN) 24 (3) Candele 21

==== Football (soccer) ====
- FIFA U-20 Women's World Cup in Germany:
  - Quarterfinals:
    - United States 1–1 (2–4 pen.) **Nigeria**
    - Mexico 1–3 **South Korea**

==== Golf ====
- Senior majors:
  - Senior British Open in Carnoustie, Scotland: (USA unless indicated)
    - (1) Bernhard Langer (GER) 279 (−5) (2) Corey Pavin 280 (−4) (3) Jay Don Blake, Russ Cochran, Fred Funk & Peter Senior (AUS) 283 (−1)
      - Langer wins his first senior major, third Champions Tour title of the season, and eleventh of his career.
- PGA Tour:
  - RBC Canadian Open in Oakville, Ontario:
    - Winner: Carl Pettersson (SWE) 266 (−14)
      - Pettersson wins his fourth PGA Tour title.
- European Tour:
  - Nordea Scandinavian Masters in Stockholm, Sweden:
    - Winner: Richard S. Johnson (SWE) 277 (−11)
      - Johnson wins his second European Tour title.
- LPGA Tour:
  - Evian Masters in Évian-les-Bains, France:
    - Winner: Jiyai Shin (KOR) 274 (−14)
      - Shin wins her seventh LPGA Tour title and regains the #1 spot in the Women's World Golf Rankings.

==== Horse racing ====
- Canadian Triple Crown:
  - Prince of Wales Stakes in Fort Erie, Ontario:
    - (1) Golden Moka (jockey: Anthony Stephen; trainer: Brian Lynch) (2) Mobil Unit (jockey: David Clark; trainer: Mike Keogh) (3) Big Red Mike (jockey: Eurico Rosa da Silva; trainer: Nick Gonzalez)

==== Motorcycle racing ====
- Moto GP:
  - United States motorcycle Grand Prix in Monterey, United States: (1) Jorge Lorenzo (ESP) (Yamaha) (2) Casey Stoner (AUS) (Ducati) (3) Valentino Rossi (ITA) (Yamaha)
    - Riders' championship standings (after 9 of 18 rounds): (1) Lorenzo 210 points (2) Dani Pedrosa (ESP) (Honda) 138 (3) Andrea Dovizioso (ITA) (Honda) 115
    - Manufacturers' championship standings: (1) Yamaha 215 points (2) Honda 175 (3) Ducati 133

==== Snooker ====
- Irish Classic in Dublin:
  - Final: **Fergal O'Brien** (IRL) def. Michael Judge (IRL) 5–1
    - O'Brien wins his second professional title.

==== Tennis ====
- ATP World Tour:
  - International German Open in Hamburg, Germany:
    - Final: **Andrey Golubev** (KAZ) def. Jürgen Melzer (AUT) 6–3, 7–5
      - Golubev becomes the first Kazakhstani player to win an ATP Tour title.
  - Atlanta Tennis Championships in Johns Creek, Georgia, United States:
    - Final: **Mardy Fish** (USA) def. John Isner (USA) 4–6, 6–4, 7–6(4)
      - Fish wins the fifth title of his career.
- WTA Tour:
  - Banka Koper Slovenia Open in Portorož, Slovenia:
    - Final: **Anna Chakvetadze** (RUS) def. Johanna Larsson (SWE) 6–1, 6–2
      - Chakvetadze wins the eighth title of her career.
  - Gastein Ladies in Bad Gastein, Austria:
    - Final: **Julia Görges** (GER) def. Timea Bacsinszky (SUI) 6–1, 6–4
      - Görges wins the first title of her career.

==== Volleyball ====
- FIVB World League Final Round in Córdoba, Argentina:
  - 3rd place: (bronze) **Serbia** 3–2 Cuba
  - Final: (silver) Russia 1–3 (gold) **Brazil**
    - Brazil win the title for the ninth time.
- Women's European League Final Four in Ankara, Turkey:
  - Bronze medal match: Israel 0–3 (bronze) **Turkey**
  - Final: (gold) **Serbia** 3–1 (silver) Bulgaria
    - Serbia win the title for the second consecutive time, and qualify for 2011 FIVB World Grand Prix.
- Central American and Caribbean Games in Mayagüez, Puerto Rico:
  - Group A: Panama 1–3 Dominican Republic
    - Standings: Venezuela, Dominican Republic 2 points (1 match), Panama 2 (2).
  - Group B:
    - Barbados 0–3 Mexico
    - Trinidad and Tobago 0–3 Puerto Rico
      - Standings (after 2 matches): Puerto Rico, Mexico 4 points, Barbados, Trinidad and Tobago 2.

=== July 24, 2010 (Saturday) ===
==== Athletics ====
- World Junior Championships in Moncton, Canada:
  - Men:
    - 5000m: (gold) David Kiprotich Bett (KEN) 13:23.76 (silver) John Kipkoech (KEN) 13:26.03 (bronze) Aziz Lahbabi (MAR) 13:28.92
    - 4 × 100 m relay: (gold) United States 38.93 (silver) Jamaica 39.55 (bronze) Trinidad and Tobago 39.72
    - Discus throw: (gold) Andrius Gudžius (LTU) 63.78 m (silver) Andrei Gag (ROM) 61.85 m (bronze) Julian Wruck (AUS) 61.09 m
  - Women:
    - 400m hurdles: ~~(gold) Katsiaryna Artsiukh (BLR) 56.16~~ (gold) Vera Rudakova (RUS) 57.16 (silver) Evonne Britton (USA) 57.32 (bronze) Shiori Miki (JPN) 57.35 NU20R
    - 4 × 100 m relay: (gold) United States 43.44 (silver) Germany 43.74 (bronze) Netherlands 44.09
    - Hammer throw: (gold) Sophie Hitchon (GBR) 66.01 m (silver) Barbara Špiler (SLO) 65.28 m (bronze) Li Zhang (CHN) 63.96 m
    - Pole vault: (gold) Angelica Bengtsson (SWE) 4.25 m (silver) Victoria von Eynatten (GER) 4.20 m (bronze) Holly Bleasdale (GBR) 4.15 m

==== Auto racing ====
- Nationwide Series:
  - Kroger 200 in Clermont, Indiana: (1) (Nevada) Kyle Busch (Toyota; Joe Gibbs Racing) (2) (Missouri) Carl Edwards (Ford; Roush Fenway Racing) (3) (Florida) Aric Almirola (Chevrolet; JR Motorsports)
    - Drivers' championship standings (after 20 of 35 races): (1) (Michigan) Brad Keselowski (Dodge; Penske Racing) 3189 points (2) Edwards 2989 (3) (Illinois) Justin Allgaier (Dodge; Penske Racing) 2691

==== Baseball ====
- European Championship in Germany:
  - Pool A:
    - Belgium 9–0 Ukraine
    - Netherlands 10–0 France
    - Germany 6–2 Czech Republic
      - Standings: Germany 2–0, Netherlands, Belgium 1–0, Czech Republic, France 0–1, Ukraine 0–2.
  - Pool B:
    - Spain 7–6 Croatia
    - Great Britain 1–4 Sweden
    - Greece 1–13 Italy
      - Standings: Italy 2–0, Greece, Sweden, Spain, Great Britain 1–1, Croatia 0–2.
- Men's Central American and Caribbean Games in Mayagüez, Puerto Rico:
  - Pool A:
    - Venezuela 2–1 Panama
    - Panama 15–0 Guatemala
    - Venezuela 11–0 U.S. Virgin Islands
      - Standings: Puerto Rico 3–0, Venezuela 3–1, Panama 2–2, Guatemala 1–3, U.S. Virgin Islands 0–3.
  - Pool B:
    - Mexico 2–5 Nicaragua
    - Dominican Republic 8–2 Netherlands Antilles
      - Standings: Dominican Republic 2–0, Nicaragua 2–1, Mexico 0–1, Netherlands Antilles 0–2.

==== Basketball ====
- FIBA Under-17 World Championship for Women in Rodez and Toulouse, France:
  - Semifinals:
    - China 74–97 **United States**
    - Belgium 49–59 **France**
  - 5th–8th semifinals:
    - **Russia** 72–52 Spain
    - **Japan** 95–92 Australia
  - 9th place playoff: Turkey 48–62 **Argentina**
  - 11th place playoff: Mali 48–82 **Canada**
- FIBA Europe Under-20 Championship for Women in Latvia:
  - Semifinals:
    - **Russia** 81–65 France
    - Latvia 52–56 **Spain**
  - 5th–8th semifinals:
    - Serbia 59–63 **Lithuania**
    - Turkey 55–74 **Ukraine**
  - 9th place playoff: **Poland** 61–50 Netherlands
  - 11th place playoff: Italy 72–91 **Belarus**
  - Group G:
    - Sweden 53–80 Romania
    - Bulgaria 53–85 Germany
      - Standings (after 5 games): Romania 10 points, Germany 8, Sweden 7, Bulgaria 5.
      - Sweden and Bulgaria are relegated to Division B.

==== Cricket ====
- Australia vs Pakistan in England:
  - 2nd Test in Leeds, day 4:
    - Australia 88 (33.1 overs) and 349 (95.3 overs); Pakistan 258 (64.5 overs) and 180/7 (50.4 overs). **Pakistan win by 3 wickets; 2-match series drawn 1–1.**

==== Cycling ====
- Grand Tours:
  - Tour de France:
    - Stage 19: (gold) Fabian Cancellara (SUI) (Team Saxo Bank) 1h 00' 56" (silver) Tony Martin (GER) (Team HTC–Columbia) + 17" (bronze) Bert Grabsch (GER) (Team HTC–Columbia) + 1' 48"
      - General classification: (1) Alberto Contador (ESP) (Astana) 89h 16' 27" (2) Andy Schleck (LUX) (Team Saxo Bank) + 39" (3) Denis Menchov (RUS) (Rabobank) + 2' 01"

==== Darts ====
- PDC Major:
  - World Matchplay, day 8:
    - Semi-finals: (ENG unless stated otherwise)
      - **Raymond van Barneveld** (NED) def. James Wade 17–8
      - **Phil Taylor** def. Simon Whitlock (AUS) 17–4

==== Equestrianism ====
- Show jumping:
  - Global Champions Tour:
    - 7th Competition in Chantilly (CSI 5*): (gold) Laura Kraut (USA) on Cedric (silver) Penelope Leprevost (FRA) on Mylord Charthago (bronze) Edwina Alexander (AUS) on Itot du Chateau
      - Standings (after 7 of 9 competitions): (1) Marco Kutscher (GER) and Marcus Ehning (GER) 182 points (3) Jos Lansink (BEL) 168

==== Football (soccer) ====
- 2011 FIFA Women's World Cup qualification (UEFA): (teams in ~~strike~~ are eliminated)
  - Group 1: ~~Northern Ireland~~ 3–0 ~~Estonia~~
    - Standings (after 8 matches): France 24 points, Iceland 21, Estonia 9, ~~Serbia~~ 8, Northern Ireland 7, ~~Croatia~~ 1.
- FIFA U-20 Women's World Cup in Germany:
  - Quarterfinals:
    - Sweden 0–2 **Colombia**
    - **Germany** 2–0 North Korea
- UEFA European Under-19 Championship in France: (teams in **bold** advance to semi-finals)
  - Group A:
    - **England** 1–1 **France**
    - Netherlands 0–1 Austria
      - Final standings: France 7 points, England 4, Austria, Netherlands 3.
  - Group B:
    - Portugal 0–5 **Croatia**
    - **Spain** 3–0 Italy
      - Final standings: Spain 9 points, Croatia 4, Portugal 3, Italy 1.

==== Golf ====
- Senior majors:
  - Senior British Open in Carnoustie, Scotland
    - Leaderboard after third round: (1) Bernhard Langer (GER) 207 (−6) (2) Corey Pavin (USA) 210 (−3) (3) Six tied at 211 (−2)

==== Lacrosse ====
- World Championship in Manchester, England:
  - Final: (silver) Canada 10–12 (gold) **United States**
    - The United States win the title for the ninth time, avenging their 2006 final defeat to Canada.
  - Bronze medal match: (bronze) **Australia** 16–9 Japan

==== Rugby union ====
- Tri Nations Series:
  - Australia 30–13 South Africa in Brisbane
    - Standings: New Zealand 10 points (2 matches), Australia 4 (1), South Africa 0 (3).

==== Six-red snooker ====
- Six-red World Championship in Bangkok, Thailand:
  - Final: **Mark Selby** (ENG) def. Ricky Walden (ENG) 8–6

==== Volleyball ====
- FIVB World League Final Round in Córdoba, Argentina:
  - Semifinals:
    - **Russia** 3–0 Serbia
    - **Brazil** 3–1 Cuba
- Women's European League Final Four in Ankara, Turkey:
  - Semifinals:
    - Israel 0–3 **Serbia**
    - Turkey 2–3 **Bulgaria**
- Central American and Caribbean Games in Mayagüez, Puerto Rico:
  - Group A: Venezuela 3–0 Panama
  - Group B:
    - Mexico 3–0 Trinidad and Tobago
    - Puerto Rico 3–1 Barbados

=== July 23, 2010 (Friday) ===
==== Athletics ====
- World Junior Championships in Moncton, Canada:
  - Men:
    - 200m: (gold) Shota Iizuka (JPN) 20.67 (silver) Aliaksandr Linnik (BLR) 20.89 (bronze) Aaron Brown (CAN) 21.00
    - 400m hurdles: (gold) Jehue Gordon (TRI) 49.30 (silver) Takatoshi Abe (JPN) 49.46 (bronze) Leslie Murray (ISV) 50.22
    - 10 km walk: (gold) Valery Filipchuk (RUS) 40:43.17 (silver) Zelin Cai (CHN) 40:43.59 (bronze) Petr Bogatyrev (RUS) 40:50.37
    - High jump: (gold) Mutaz Essa Barshim (QAT) 2.30 m (silver) David Smith (USA) 2.24 m (bronze) Naoto Tobe (JPN) 2.21 m
    - Javelin throw: (gold) Till Wöschler (GER) 82.52 m (silver) Genki Dean (JPN) 76.44 m (bronze) Dmitri Tarabin (RUS) 76.42 m
  - Women:
    - 200m: (gold) Stormy Kendrick (USA) 22.99 (silver) Jodie Williams (GBR) 23.19 (bronze) Jamile Samuel (NED) 23.27
    - Long jump: (gold) Irisdaymi Herrera (CUB) 6.41 m (silver) Wupin Wang (CHN) 6.23 m (bronze) Marharyta Tverdohlib (UKR) 6.20 m
    - Heptathlon: (gold) Dafne Schippers (NED) 5967 points (silver) Sara Gambetta (GER) 5770 (bronze) Helga Margrét Thorsteinsdóttir (ISL) 5706

==== Baseball ====
- European Championship in Germany:
  - Pool A:
    - France vs. Belgium. Postponed due to inclement weather.
    - Czech Republic vs. Netherlands. Postponed in the first inning due to inclement weather, with the Netherlands leading 2–0.
    - Ukraine 0–10 Germany
  - Pool B:
    - Croatia 1–10 Great Britain
    - Sweden 9–12 Greece
    - Italy 9–1 Spain
- Men's Central American and Caribbean Games in Mayagüez, Puerto Rico:
  - Pool A: Guatemala 0–20 Venezuela
  - Pool B: Nicaragua 6–0 Netherlands Antilles

==== Basketball ====
- FIBA Under-17 World Championship for Women in France:
  - Quarterfinals in Toulouse:
    - **China** 68–59 Russia
    - **United States** 86–57 Spain
    - **Belgium** 93–70 Japan
    - **France** 69–59 Australia
  - 9th–12th semifinals in Rodez:
    - **Turkey** 88–56 Mali
    - **Argentina** 59–51 Canada
- FIBA Europe Under-20 Championship for Women in Latvia:
  - Quarterfinals:
    - **Russia** 92–72 Serbia
    - Lithuania 61–69 **France**
    - **Spain** 75–74 Ukraine
    - **Latvia** 64–57 Turkey
  - 9th–12th semifinals:
    - **Poland** 66–53 Italy
    - Belarus 78–88 **Netherlands**
  - Group G:
    - Germany 64–67 Sweden
    - Romania 62–41 Bulgaria
      - Standings (after 4 games): Romania 8 points, Germany, Sweden 6, Bulgaria 4.

==== Cricket ====
- Australia vs Pakistan in England:
  - 2nd Test in Leeds, day 3:
    - Australia 88 (33.1 overs) and 349 (95.3 overs); Pakistan 258 (64.5 overs) and 140/3 (37 overs). Pakistan require another 40 runs with 7 wickets remaining.

==== Cycling ====
- Grand Tours:
  - Tour de France:
    - Stage 18: (gold) Mark Cavendish (GBR) (Team HTC–Columbia) 4h 37' 09" (silver) Julian Dean (NZL) (Garmin–Transitions) s.t. (bronze) Alessandro Petacchi (ITA) (Lampre–Farnese) s.t.
      - General classification: (1) Alberto Contador (ESP) (Astana) 88h 09' 48" (2) Andy Schleck (LUX) (Team Saxo Bank) + 8" (3) Samuel Sánchez (ESP) (Euskaltel–Euskadi) + 3' 32"

==== Darts ====
- PDC Major:
  - World Matchplay, day 7:
    - Quarter-finals: (ENG unless stated otherwise)
      - **James Wade** def. Wayne Jones 16–12
      - **Simon Whitlock** (AUS) def. Jelle Klaasen (NED) 16–8
      - **Raymond van Barneveld** (NED) def. Co Stompé (NED) 16–12
      - **Phil Taylor** def. Kevin Painter 16–4

==== Football (soccer) ====
- UEFA Europa League Second qualifying round, second leg: (first leg score in parentheses)
  - UE Sant Julià (Andorra) 0–5 (0–3) (Finland) **MYPA**. MYPA win 8–0 on aggregate.

==== Golf ====
- Senior majors:
  - Senior British Open in Carnoustie, Scotland
    - Leaderboard after second round (USA unless otherwise indicated): (1) Bernhard Langer (GER) and Corey Pavin 138 (−4) (3) Dan Forsman, Jay Haas, Larry Mize and Ian Woosnam (WAL) 139 (−3)

==== Volleyball ====
- FIVB World League Final Round in Córdoba, Argentina: (teams in **bold** advance to the semifinals)
  - Pool E: Argentina 0–3 **Serbia**
    - Final standings: **Brazil**, Serbia 4 points, Argentina 1.
  - Pool F: **Cuba** 3–0 Italy
    - Final standings: **Russia**, Cuba 4 points, Italy 1.
- Women's Central American and Caribbean Games in Mayagüez, Puerto Rico:
  - Classification 7/8: Barbados 0–3 **Nicaragua**
  - Classification 5/6: Guatemala 0–3 **Mexico**
  - Bronze Medal: Trinidad and Tobago 1–3 (bronze) **Costa Rica**
  - Gold Medal: (gold) **Dominican Republic** 3–2 (silver) Puerto Rico
    - The Dominican Republic win the title for the fifth time.

=== July 22, 2010 (Thursday) ===
==== Athletics ====
- World Junior Championships in Moncton, Canada:
  - Men:
    - 400m: (gold) Kirani James (GRN) 45.89 (silver) Marcell Deák Nagy (HUN) 46.09 (bronze) Errol Nolan (USA) 46.36
    - 1500m: (gold) Caleb Mwangangi Ndiku (KEN) 3:37.30 (silver) Abderrahmane Anou (ALG) 3:38.86 (bronze) Mohammad Al-Garni (QAT) 3:38.91
    - Pole vault: (gold) Anton Ivakin (RUS) 5.50 m (silver) Claudio Stecchi (ITA) 5.40 m (bronze) Andrew Sutcliffe (GBR) 5.35 m
  - Women:
    - 400m: (gold) Shaunae Miller (BAH) 52.52 (silver) Margaret Etim (NGR) 53.05 (bronze) Bianca Răzor (ROU) 53.17
    - 800m: (gold) Elena Mirela Lavric (ROU) 2:01.85 (silver) Cherono Koech (KEN) 2:02.29 (bronze) Annet Negesa (UGA) 2:02.51
    - 100m hurdles: (gold) Isabelle Pedersen (NOR) 13.30 (silver) Jenna Pletsch (GER) 13.35 (bronze) Miriam Hehl (GER) 13.46
    - 3000m steeplechase: (gold) Purity Cherotich Kirui (KEN) 9:36.34 (silver) Birtukan Adamu (ETH) 9:43.23 (bronze) Lucia Kamene Muangi (KEN) 9:43.71
    - Discus throw: (gold) Yaime Pérez (CUB) 56.01 m (silver) Erin Pendleton (USA) 54.96 m (bronze) Yuliya Kurylo (UKR) 53.96 m
    - Triple jump: (gold) Dailenys Alcántara (CUB) 14.09 m (silver) Laura Samuel (GBR) 13.75 m (bronze) Lina Deng (CHN) 13.72 m
- IAAF Diamond League:
  - Herculis in Fontvieille, Monaco:
    - Men:
      - 200m: Tyson Gay (USA) 19.72
      - 400m: Jermaine Gonzales (JAM) 44.40
      - 800m: Abubaker Kaki Khamis (SUD) 1:43.10
      - 1500m: Silas Kiplagat (KEN) 3:29.27
      - 110m hurdles: David Oliver (USA) 13.01
      - 400m hurdles: Bershawn Jackson (USA) 47.78
      - Discus throw: Gerd Kanter (EST) 67.81 m
      - High jump: Ivan Ukhov (RUS) 2.34 m
      - Long jump: Dwight Phillips (USA) 8.46 m
    - Women:
      - 100m: Carmelita Jeter (USA) 10.82
      - 800m: Alysia Johnson (USA) 1:57.34
      - 3000m: Sentayehu Ejigu (ETH) 8:28.41
      - 100m hurdles: Lolo Jones (USA) 12.63
      - 400m hurdles: Kaliese Spencer (JAM) 53.63
      - Javelin throw: Barbora Špotáková (CZE) 65.76 m
      - Pole vault: Fabiana Murer (BRA) 4.80 m
      - Shot put: Nadzeya Astapchuk (BLR) 20.23 m
      - Triple jump: Yargelis Savigne (CUB) 15.09 m

==== Baseball ====
- Men's Central American and Caribbean Games in Mayagüez, Puerto Rico:
  - Pool A:
    - U.S. Virgin Islands 6–7 Guatemala
    - Puerto Rico 6–0 Panama
  - Pool B: Nicaragua 0–0 (suspended) Mexico

==== Cricket ====
- Australia vs Pakistan in England:
  - 2nd Test in Leeds, day 2:
    - Australia 88 (33.1 overs) and 136/2 (41 overs); Pakistan 258 (64.5 overs). Australia trail by 34 runs with 8 wickets remaining.
- India in Sri Lanka:
  - 1st Test in Galle, day 5:
    - Sri Lanka 520/8d (124 overs) and 96/0 (14.1 overs); India 276 (65 overs) and 338 (f/o; 115.4 overs; Lasith Malinga 5-50). **Sri Lanka win by 10 wickets; lead 3-match series 1–0.**
      - Muttiah Muralitharan ends his Test career with exactly 800 wickets, after claiming the wicket of Pragyan Ojha to end the Indian innings.

==== Cycling ====
- Grand Tours:
  - Tour de France:
    - Stage 17: (gold) Andy Schleck (LUX) (Team Saxo Bank) 5h 03' 29" (silver) Alberto Contador (ESP) (Astana) s.t. (bronze) Joaquim Rodríguez (ESP) (Team Katusha) + 1' 18"
      - General classification: (1) Contador 83h 32' 39" (2) Schleck + 8" (3) Samuel Sánchez (ESP) (Euskaltel–Euskadi) + 3' 32"

==== Darts ====
- PDC Major:
  - World Matchplay, day 6:
    - Second round: (ENG unless stated otherwise)
      - **Jelle Klaasen** (NED) def. Gary Anderson (SCO) 14–12
      - **Kevin Painter** def. Mark Walsh 14–12
      - **Phil Taylor** def. Steve Beaton 13–4
      - **Simon Whitlock** (AUS) def. Steve Brown 13–10

==== Fencing ====
- European Championships in Leipzig, Germany:
  - Men's Épée Team:
    - Final: (gold) **Hungary** def. (silver) Ukraine 45–39
    - (bronze) Germany
  - Women's Sabre Team:
    - Final: (gold) **Ukraine** def. (silver) Russia 45–38
    - (bronze) Italy

==== Football (soccer) ====
- UEFA Europa League Second qualifying round, second leg: (first leg score in parentheses)
  - Mika (Armenia) 0–0 (0–1) (North Macedonia) **Rabotnički**. Rabotnički win 1–0 on aggregate.
  - **Teteks** (North Macedonia) 3–1 (0–0) (Latvia) Ventspils. Teteks win 3–1 on aggregate.
  - Torpedo Zhodino (Belarus) 0–1 (2–2) (Serbia) **OFK Beograd**. OFK Beograd win 3–2 on aggregate.
  - Dukla Banská Bystrica (Slovakia) 1–0 (0–3) (Georgia (country)) **Zestafoni**. Zestafoni win 3–1 on aggregate.
  - Mogren (Montenegro) 2–1 (0–2) (Israel) **Maccabi Tel Aviv**. Maccabi Tel Aviv win 3–2 on aggregate.
  - **Spartak Zlatibor Voda** (Serbia) 2–0 (3–3) (Luxembourg) Differdange. Spartak Zlatibor Voda win 5–3 on aggregate.
  - Sillamäe Kalev (Estonia) 0–5 (1–5) (Belarus) **Dinamo Minsk**. Dinamo Minsk win 10–1 on aggregate.
  - Jelgava (Latvia) 2–1 (0–1) (Norway) **Molde**. 2–2 on aggregate; Molde win on away goals rule.
  - **Qarabağ** (Azerbaijan) (Northern Ireland) 1–1 (2–1) Portadown. Qarabağ win 3–2 on aggregate.
  - TPS (Finland) 1–2 (1–0) (Belgium) **Cercle Brugge**. 2–2 on aggregate; Cercle Brugge win on away goals rule.
  - Široki Brijeg (Bosnia and Herzegovina) 0–1 (2–2) **Austria Wien**. Austria Wien win 3–2 on aggregate.
  - **Baník Ostrava** (Czech Republic) 0–0 (6–0) (Georgia (country)) WIT Georgia. Baník Ostrava win 6–0 on aggregate.
  - **Dnepr Mogilev** (Belarus) 1–1 (2–2) (Norway) Stabæk. 3–3 on aggregate; Dnepr Mogilev win on away goals rule.
  - **Karpaty Lviv** (Ukraine) 3–2 (3–0) (Iceland) KR Reykjavík. Karpaty Lviv win 6–2 on aggregate.
  - Dacia (Moldova) 0–2 (0–0) (Sweden) **Kalmar FF**. Kalmar FF win 2–0 on aggregate.
  - **Dinamo Tbilisi** (Georgia (country)) 2–1 (2–1) (Sweden) Gefle. Dinamo Tbilisi win 4–2 on aggregate.
  - **APOEL** (Cyprus) 3–1 (3–0) (Lithuania) Tauras Tauragė. APOEL win 6–1 on aggregate.
  - Iskra-Stal (Moldova) 0–1 (1–2) (Sweden) **IF Elfsborg**. IF Elfsborg win 3–1 on aggregate.
  - **Randers** (Denmark) 1–1 (3–0) (Slovenia) Gorica. Randers win 4–1 on aggregate.
  - Bnei Yehuda (Israel) 0–1 (1–1) (Republic of Ireland) **Shamrock Rovers**. Shamrock Rovers win 2–1 on aggregate.
  - KF Tirana (Albania) 1–1 (0–4) (Netherlands) **Utrecht**. Utrecht win 5–1 on aggregate.
  - **Dinamo București** (Romania) 5–1 (2–0) (Moldova) Olimpia. Dinamo București win 7–1 on aggregate.
  - Vaduz (Liechtenstein) 0–0 (0–3) (Denmark) **Brøndby**. Brøndby win 3–0 on aggregate.
  - **Wisła Kraków** (Poland) 5–0 (2–0) (Lithuania) Šiauliai. Wisła Kraków win 7–0 on aggregate.
  - Dundalk (Republic of Ireland) 0–2 (0–6) (Bulgaria) **Levski Sofia**. Levski Sofia win 8–0 on aggregate.
  - **Ruch Chorzów** (Poland) 0–0 (1–1) (Malta) Valletta. 1–1 on aggregate; Ruch Chorzów win on away goals rule.
  - Víkingur (Faroe Islands) 0–4 (0–3) (Turkey) **Beşiktaş**. Beşiktaş win 7–0 on aggregate.
  - Tre Penne (San Marino) 2–9 (1–4) (Bosnia and Herzegovina) **Zrinjski**. Zrinjski win 13–3 on aggregate.
  - **Győri ETO** (Hungary) 2–0 (3–0) (Kazakhstan) Atyrau. Győri ETO win 5–0 on aggregate.
  - **Olympiacos** (Greece) 6–1 (5–0) (Albania) Besa Kavajë. Olympiacos win 11–1 on aggregate.
  - **Bangor City** (Wales) 2–1 (1–1) (Finland) Honka. Bangor City win 3–2 on aggregate.
  - **Maribor** (Slovenia) 2–0 (1–1) (Hungary) Videoton. Maribor win 3–1 on aggregate.
  - **Rapid Wien** (Austria) 4–2 (2–0) (Lithuania) Sūduva Marijampolė. Rapid Wien win 6–2 on aggregate.
  - Šibenik (Croatia) 0–3 (a.e.t.) (2–0) (Cyprus) **Anorthosis**. Anorthosis win 3–2 on aggregate.
  - Sporting Fingal (Republic of Ireland) 2–3 (2–3) (Portugal) **Marítimo**. Marítimo win 6–4 on aggregate.
  - Borac Banja Luka (Bosnia and Herzegovina) 1–1 (0–1) (Switzerland) **Lausanne-Sport**. Lausanne-Sport win 2–1 on aggregate.
  - Cibalia (Croatia) 0–0 (0–1) (Northern Ireland) **Cliftonville**. Cliftonville win 1–0 on aggregate.
  - **Budućnost Podgorica** (Montenegro) 1–2 (3–0) (Azerbaijan) Baku. Budućnost Podgorica win 4–2 on aggregate.
  - Breiðablik (Iceland) 0–1 (0–1) (Scotland) **Motherwell**. Motherwell win 2–0 on aggregate.
  - UE Sant Julià (Andorra) – (0–3) (Finland) MYPA. Match abandoned after 80 minutes due to adverse weather, with MYPA leading 1–0 on the night.

==== Golf ====
- Senior majors:
  - Senior British Open in Carnoustie, Scotland
    - Leaderboard after first round: (1) Jay Don Blake (USA), Bernhard Langer (GER) and Carl Mason (ENG) 67 (−4)

==== Lacrosse ====
- World Championship in Manchester, England:
  - Semifinals:
    - **Canada** 15–6 Australia
    - **United States** 20–5 Japan

==== Open water swimming ====
- World Championships in Lac Saint-Jean, Quebec, Canada:
  - Men's 25K: (gold) Alex Meyer (USA) (silver) Valerio Cleri (ITA) (bronze) Petar Stoychev (BUL)
  - Women's 25K: (gold) Linsy Heister (NED) (silver) Margarita Minguez Cabezas (ESP) (bronze) Celia Barrot (FRA)

==== Volleyball ====
- FIVB World League Final Round in Córdoba, Argentina: (teams in **bold** advance to the semifinals)
  - Pool E: Serbia 2–3 **Brazil**
    - Standings: Brazil 4 points (2 matches), Serbia, Argentina 1 (1)
  - Pool F: **Russia** 3–2 Cuba
    - Standings: Russia 4 points (2 matches), Cuba, Italy 1 (1)
- Women's Central American and Caribbean Games in Mayagüez, Puerto Rico:
  - Classification 5/8:
    - Barbados 2–3 **Guatemala**
    - Nicaragua 0–3 **Mexico**
  - Semifinals:
    - **Dominican Republic** 3–0 Trinidad and Tobago
    - **Puerto Rico** 3–0 Costa Rica

=== July 21, 2010 (Wednesday) ===
==== Athletics ====
- World Junior Championships in Moncton, Canada:
  - Men:
    - 100m: (gold) Dexter Lee (JAM) 10.21 (silver) Charles Silmon (USA) 10.23 (bronze) Jimmy Vicaut (FRA) 10.28
    - Long jump: (gold) Luvo Manyonga (RSA) 7.99 m (silver) Eusebio Cáceres (ESP) 7.90 m (bronze) Taylor Stewart (CAN) 7.63 m
    - Shot put: (gold) Jacko Gill (NZL) 20.76 m (silver) Božidar Antunovic (SRB) 20.20 m (bronze) Yongheng Ding (CHN) 20.14 m
    - Decathlon: (gold) Kevin Mayer (FRA) 7928 points (silver) Ilya Shkurenev (RUS) 7830 (bronze) Marcus Nilsson (SWE) 7751
  - Women:
    - 100m: (gold) Jodie Williams (GBR) 11.40 (silver) Takeia Pinckney (USA) 11.49 (bronze) Jamile Samuel (NED) 11.56
    - 5000m: (gold) Genzebe Dibaba (ETH) 15:08.06 (silver) Mercy Cherono (KEN) 15:09.19 (bronze) Alice Aprot Nawowuna (KEN) 15:17.39
    - 10 km walk: (gold) Elena Lashmanova (RUS) 44:11.90 (silver) Anna Lukyanova (RUS) 44:17.98 (bronze) Kumiko Okada (JPN) 45:56.15
    - Javelin throw: (gold) Sanni Utriainen (FIN) 56.69 m (silver) Līna Mūze (LAT) 56.64 m (bronze) Tazmin Brits (RSA) 54.55 m

==== Baseball ====
- Men's Central American and Caribbean Games in Mayagüez, Puerto Rico:
  - Pool A:
    - U.S. Virgin Islands 0–1 Panama
    - Venezuela 2–3 Puerto Rico
  - Pool B:
    - Dominican Republic 10–1 Nicaragua
    - Netherlands Antilles 0–0 (suspended) Mexico

==== Basketball ====
- FIBA Under-17 World Championship for Women in France: (teams in **bold** advance to the quarterfinals)
  - Group A in Rodez:
    - **Russia** 51–64 Turkey
    - **United States** 133–71 **Japan**
    - Canada 60–81 **France**
      - Final standings: USA 10 points, France 8, Russia, Japan, Turkey 7, Canada 6.
  - Group B in Toulouse:
    - **Australia** 61–67 **Belgium**
    - Mali 49–75 Argentina
    - **China** 77–58 **Spain**
      - Final standings: Belgium, China 9 points, Australia 8, Spain, Argentina 7, Mali 5.
- FIBA Europe Under-20 Championship for Women in Latvia: (teams in **bold** advance to the quarterfinals)
  - Group E:
    - **Russia** 76–59 **France**
    - Netherlands 60–71 **Latvia**
    - **Ukraine** 67–50 Poland
      - Final standings: Russia, Latvia 9 points, France 8, Ukraine 7, Poland, Netherlands 6.
  - Group F:
    - **Serbia** 89–72 Belarus
    - **Lithuania** 72–54 Italy
    - **Turkey** 57–80 **Spain**
      - Final standings: Spain 10 points, Lithuania, Turkey, Serbia 8, Belarus 6, Italy 5.
  - Group G:
    - Bulgaria 52–72 Sweden
    - Germany 50–70 Romania
      - Standings (after 3 games): Romania 6 points, Germany 5, Sweden 4, Bulgaria 3.

==== Cricket ====
- Australia vs Pakistan in England:
  - 2nd Test in Leeds, day 1:
    - Australia 88 (33.1 overs); Pakistan 148/3 (39 overs). Pakistan lead by 60 runs with 7 wickets remaining in the 1st innings.
- India in Sri Lanka:
  - 1st Test in Galle, day 4:
    - Sri Lanka 520/8d (124 overs); India 276 (65 overs; Virender Sehwag 109, Muttiah Muralitharan 5-63) and 181/5 (f/o; 59.3 overs). India trail by 63 runs with 5 wickets remaining.

==== Darts ====
- PDC Major:
  - World Matchplay, day 5:
    - Second round: (ENG unless stated otherwise)
      - **Wayne Jones** def. Ronnie Baxter 13–9
      - **Co Stompé** (NED) def. Mark Webster (WAL) 13–9
      - **James Wade** def. Vincent van der Voort (NED) 13–10
      - **Raymond van Barneveld** (NED) def. Alan Tabern 13–5

==== Fencing ====
- European Championships in Leipzig, Germany:
  - Men's Foil Team:
    - Final: (gold) **Italy** def. (silver) Russia 45–33
    - (bronze) (United Kingdom) Great Britain
  - Women's Épée Team:
    - Final: (gold) **Poland** def. (silver) Italy 35–30
    - (bronze) France

==== Football (soccer) ====
- FIFA U-20 Women's World Cup in Germany: (teams in **bold** advance to the quarterfinals)
  - Group C:
    - Japan 3–1 England
    - **Nigeria** 1–1 **Mexico**
      - Final standings: Mexico, Nigeria 5 points, Japan 4, England 1.
  - Group D:
    - **South Korea** 0–1 **United States**
    - Ghana 2–0 Switzerland
      - Final standings: United States 7 points, Korea Republic 6, Ghana 4, Switzerland 0.
- UEFA European Under-19 Championship in France: (teams in **bold** advance to the semi-finals)
  - Group A:
    - France 5–0 Austria
    - Netherlands 1–0 England
      - Standings (after 2 matches): France 6 points, Netherlands, England 3, Austria 0.
  - Group B:
    - **Spain** 2–1 Portugal
    - Croatia 0–0 Italy
      - Standings (after 2 matches): Spain 6 points, Portugal 3, Croatia, Italy 1.
- UEFA Champions League Second qualifying round, second leg: (first leg score in parentheses)
  - Olimpi Rustavi (Georgia (country)) 1–1 (0–2) (Kazakhstan) **Aktobe**. Aktobe win 3–1 on aggregate.
  - Pyunik (Armenia) 0–1 (1–3) (Serbia) **Partizan**. Partizan win 4–1 on aggregate.
  - Jeunesse Esch (Luxembourg) 0–0 (0–1) (Sweden) **AIK**. AIK win 1–0 on aggregate.
  - **HJK Helsinki** (Finland) 2–0 (a.e.t.) (0–1) (Lithuania) Ekranas. HJK Helsinki win 2–1 on aggregate.
  - **Žilina** (Slovakia) 3–0 (0–1) (Malta) Birkirkara. Žilina win 3–1 on aggregate.
  - **Sparta Prague** (Czech Republic) 2–0 (3–0) (Latvia) Liepājas Metalurgs. Sparta Prague win 5–0 on aggregate.
  - **Debrecen** (Hungary) 3–2 (1–1) (Estonia) Levadia. Debrecen win 4–3 on aggregate.
  - **Lech Poznań** (Poland) 0–1 (a.e.t.) (1–0) (Azerbaijan) Inter Baku. 1–1 on aggregate; Lech Poznań win 9–8 on penalties.
  - Željezničar (Bosnia and Herzegovina) 0–1 (0–5) (Israel) **Hapoel Tel Aviv**. Hapoel Tel Aviv win 6–0 on aggregate.
  - **Rosenborg** (Norway) 2–0 (0–0) (Northern Ireland) Linfield. Rosenborg win 2–0 on aggregate.
  - FH (Iceland) 0–1 (1–5) (Belarus) **BATE**. BATE win 6–1 on aggregate.

==== Volleyball ====
- FIVB World League Final Round in Córdoba, Argentina:
  - Pool E: Brazil 3–2 Argentina
  - Pool F: Italy 2–3 Russia
- Women's Central American and Caribbean Games in Mayagüez, Puerto Rico:
  - Quarterfinals:
    - **Costa Rica** 3–0 Guatemala
    - Mexico 1–3 **Trinidad and Tobago**

=== July 20, 2010 (Tuesday) ===
==== Athletics ====
- World Junior Championships in Moncton, Canada:
  - Men:
    - 10,000m: (gold) Dennis Chepkongin Masai (KEN) 27:53.89 (silver) Gebretsadik Abraha (ETH) 28:03.45 (bronze) Paul Kipchumba Lonyangata (KEN) 29:11.75
  - Women:
    - Shot put: (gold) Geisa Arcanjo (BRA) 17.02 m (silver) Qianqian Meng (CHN) 16.94 m (bronze) Shuang Cui (CHN) 16.13 m

==== Baseball ====
- Men's Central American and Caribbean Games in Mayagüez, Puerto Rico:
  - Pool A:
    - Guatemala 0–9 Puerto Rico
    - Panama 0–0 (suspended) Venezuela
- Major League Baseball news:
  - Chicago Cubs manager Lou Piniella announces his retirement, effective at the end of the 2010 season. (ESPN)

==== Basketball ====
- FIBA Under-17 World Championship for Women in France: (teams in **bold** advance to the quarterfinals, teams in ~~strike~~ are eliminated)
  - Group A in Rodez:
    - Canada 61–78 Russia
    - Turkey 55–84 **United States**
    - France 70–67 Japan
      - Standings (after 4 games): USA 8 points, Japan, Russia, France 6, Canada, Turkey 5.
  - Group B in Toulouse:
    - **Belgium** 90–80 **China**
    - ~~Mali~~ 39–88 **Australia**
    - ~~Argentina~~ 38–68 **Spain**
      - Standings (after 4 games): Belgium, China, Australia 7 points, Spain 6, Argentina 5, Mali 4.
- FIBA Europe Under-20 Championship for Women in Latvia: (teams in **bold** advance to the quarterfinals, teams in ~~strike~~ are eliminated)
  - Group E:
    - Ukraine 86–73 Netherlands
    - **France** 67–70 **Latvia**
    - Poland 62–75 **Russia**
      - Standings (after 4 games): Latvia, France, Russia 7 points, Ukraine, Netherlands, Poland 5.
  - Group F:
    - **Spain** 80–68 **Lithuania**
    - Belarus 61–60 ~~Italy~~
    - Serbia 75–71 **Turkey**
      - Standings (after 4 games): Spain 8 points, Turkey 7, Lithuania, Serbia 6, Belarus 5, Italy 4.
  - Group G:
    - Germany 70–58 Bulgaria
    - Romania 67–50 Sweden
      - Standings (after 2 games): Romania, Germany 4 points, Bulgaria, Sweden 2.

==== Cricket ====
- India in Sri Lanka:
  - 1st Test in Galle, day 3:
    - Sri Lanka 520/8d (124 overs; Tharanga Paranavitana 111); India 140/3 (29.4 overs). India trail by 380 runs with 7 wickets remaining in the 1st innings.
- Bangladesh vs Netherlands in Scotland:
  - Only ODI in Glasgow:
    - Bangladesh 199/7 (30/30 overs); Netherlands 200/4 (28.5 overs). **Netherlands win by 6 wickets.**

==== Cycling ====
- Grand Tours:
  - Tour de France:
    - Stage 16: (gold) Pierrick Fédrigo (FRA) (Bbox Bouygues Telecom) 5h 31' 43" (silver) Sandy Casar (FRA) (FDJ) s.t. (bronze) Rubén Plaza (ESP) (Caisse d'Epargne) s.t.
      - General classification: (1) Alberto Contador (ESP) (Astana) 78h 29' 10" (2) Andy Schleck (LUX) (Team Saxo Bank) + 8" (3) Samuel Sánchez (ESP) (Euskaltel–Euskadi) + 2' 00"

==== Darts ====
- PDC Major:
  - World Matchplay, day 4:
    - First round: (ENG unless stated otherwise)
      - **Kevin Painter** def. Colin Lloyd 11–9
      - **Mark Walsh** def. Mark Dudbridge 12–10
      - **Phil Taylor** def. Barrie Bates (WAL) 10–6
      - **Steve Beaton** def. Paul Nicholson (AUS) 10–3

==== Fencing ====
- European Championships in Leipzig, Germany:
  - Men's Sabre Team:
    - Final: (gold) **Italy** def. (silver) Ukraine 45–28
    - (bronze) Germany
  - Women's Foil Team:
    - Final: (gold) **Italy** def. (silver) Germany 45–26
    - (bronze) Russia

==== Football (soccer) ====
- FIFA U-20 Women's World Cup in Germany: (teams in **bold** advance to the semifinals)
  - Group A:
    - France 1–4 **Germany**
    - Costa Rica 0–3 **Colombia**
      - Final standings: Germany 9 points, Colombia, France 4, Costa Rica 0.
  - Group B:
    - New Zealand 1–4 Brazil
    - **North Korea** 2–3 **Sweden**
      - Final standings: Sweden 7 points, Korea DPR 6, Brazil 4, New Zealand 0.
- UEFA Champions League Second qualifying round, second leg: (first leg score in parentheses)
  - Renova (North Macedonia) 0–2 (0–3) (Cyprus) **Omonia**. Omonia win 5–0 on aggregate.
  - HB Tórshavn (Faroe Islands) 1–0 (0–5) (Austria) **Red Bull Salzburg**. Red Bull Salzburg win 5–1 on aggregate.
  - Dinamo Tirana (Albania) 1–0 (1–3) (Moldova) **FC Sheriff**. FC Sheriff win 3–2 on aggregate.
  - **The New Saints** (Wales) 4–0 (0–1) (Republic of Ireland) Bohemians. The New Saints win 4–1 on aggregate.
  - Koper (Slovenia) 3–0 (1–5) (Croatia) **Dinamo Zagreb**. Dinamo Zagreb win 5–4 on aggregate.
  - Rudar Pljevlja (Montenegro) 0–4 (0–1) (Bulgaria) **Litex Lovech**. Litex Lovech win 5–0 on aggregate.

==== Open water swimming ====
- World Championships in Lac Saint-Jean, Quebec, Canada:
  - Men's 5K: (gold) Thomas Lurz (GER) (silver) Evgeny Frattsev (RUS) (bronze) Fran Crippen (USA)
  - Women's 5K: (gold) Eva Fabian (USA) (silver) Giorgia Consiglio (ITA) (bronze) Ana Cunha (BRA)

==== Volleyball ====
- Women's Central American and Caribbean Games in Mayagüez, Puerto Rico:
  - Group A:
    - Barbados 0–3 Costa Rica
    - Dominican Republic 3–0 Trinidad and Tobago
      - Final standings: Dominican Republic 6 points, Costa Rica 5, Trinidad and Tobago 4, Barbados 3.
  - Group B:
    - Nicaragua 2–3 Guatemala
    - Puerto Rico 3–0 Mexico
      - Final standings: Puerto Rico 6 points, Mexico 5, Guatemala 4, Nicaragua 3.

=== July 19, 2010 (Monday) ===
==== Athletics ====
- World Junior Championships in Moncton, Canada:
  - Women's 3000m: (gold) Mercy Cherono (KEN) 8:55.07 (silver) Emebet Anteneh (ETH) 8:55.24 (bronze) Layes Abdullayeva (AZE) 8:55.33

==== Basketball ====
- FIBA Europe Under-20 Championship for Women in Latvia: (teams in **bold** advance to the quarterfinals)
  - Group E:
    - Latvia 63–49 Poland
    - Ukraine 66–80 France
    - Netherlands 74–53 Russia
      - Standings (after 3 games): France 6 points, Latvia, Russia 5, Netherlands, Poland 4, Ukraine 3
  - Group F:
    - Lithuania 63–57 Serbia
    - Belarus 69–91 **Spain**
    - Italy 58–67 **Turkey**
      - Standings (after 3 games): Spain, Turkey 6 points, Lithuania 5, Serbia 4, Belarus, Italy 3
  - Group G:
    - Bulgaria 51–80 Romania
    - Sweden 57–84 Germany

==== Cricket ====
- India in Sri Lanka:
  - 1st Test in Galle, day 2:
    - Sri Lanka 256/2 (68 overs; Tharanga Paranavitana 110*); India.
      - Rain prevented play on Day 2.
- Bangladesh in Scotland:
  - Only ODI in Glasgow:
    - Bangladesh vs. Scotland. **Match abandoned without a ball bowled.**

==== Cycling ====
- Grand Tours:
  - Tour de France:
    - Stage 15: (gold) Thomas Voeckler (FRA) (Bbox Bouygues Telecom) 4h 44' 51" (silver) Alessandro Ballan (ITA) (BMC Racing Team) + 1' 20" (bronze) Aitor Pérez (ESP) (Footon–Servetto–Fuji) + 1' 20"
      - General classification: (1) Alberto Contador (ESP) (Astana) 72h 50' 42" (2) Andy Schleck (LUX) (Team Saxo Bank) + 8" (3) Samuel Sánchez (ESP) (Euskaltel–Euskadi) + 2' 00"

==== Darts ====
- PDC Major:
  - World Matchplay, day 3:
    - First round: (ENG unless stated otherwise)
      - **Steve Brown** def. Terry Jenkins 10–6
      - **Simon Whitlock** (AUS) def. Tony Eccles 10–1
      - **Gary Anderson** (SCO) def. Robert Thornton (SCO) 10–0
      - **Jelle Klaasen** (NED) def. Mervyn King 10–4

==== Fencing ====
- European Championships in Leipzig, Germany:
  - Men's Épée Individual:
    - Final: (gold) **Jean-Michel Lucenay** (FRA) def. (silver) Gábor Boczkó (HUN) 15–11
    - (bronze) Radosław Zawrotniak (POL) and Pavel Sukhov (RUS)
  - Women's Sabre Individual:
    - Final: (gold) **Svetlana Kormilitsyna** (RUS) def. (silver) Sophia Velikaia (RUS) 15–13
    - (bronze) Ilaria Bianco (ITA) and Sibylle Klemm (GER)

==== Volleyball ====
- Women's Central American and Caribbean Games in Mayagüez, Puerto Rico:
  - Group A:
    - Barbados 0–3 Dominican Republic
    - Costa Rica 3–2 Trinidad and Tobago
      - Standings (after 2 matches): Dominican Republic 4 points, Trinidad and Tobago, Costa Rica 3, Barbados 2.
  - Group B:
    - Nicaragua 0–3 Mexico
    - Guatemala 0–3 Puerto Rico
      - Standings (after 2 matches): Puerto Rico, Mexico 4 points, Nicaragua, Guatemala 2.

=== July 18, 2010 (Sunday) ===
==== Auto racing ====
- IndyCar Series:
  - Honda Indy Toronto in Toronto, Canada: (1) Will Power (AUS) (Team Penske) (2) Dario Franchitti (GBR) (Chip Ganassi Racing) (3) Ryan Hunter-Reay (USA) (Andretti Autosport)
    - Drivers' championship standings (after 10 of 17 races): (1) Power 377 points (2) Franchitti 335 (3) Scott Dixon (NZL) (Chip Ganassi Racing) 299
- World Touring Car Championship:
  - Race of UK:
    - Round 11: (1) Yvan Muller (FRA) (Chevrolet; Chevrolet Cruze) (2) Robert Huff (GBR) (Chevrolet; Chevrolet Cruze) (3) Colin Turkington (GBR) (eBay Motors/WSR; BMW 320si)
    - Round 12: (1) Andy Priaulx (GBR) (BMW Team RBM; BMW 320si) (2) Turkington (3) Gabriele Tarquini (ITA) (SR-Sport; SEAT León)
      - Drivers' championship standings (after 12 of 22 rounds): (1) Muller 199 points (2) Tarquini 176 (3) Priaulx 148
      - Manufacturers' championship standings: (1) Chevrolet 378 points (2) SEAT Customers Technology 361 (3) BMW 317

==== Basketball ====
- FIBA Under-17 World Championship for Women in France: (teams in **bold** advance to the quarterfinals)
  - Group A in Rodez:
    - **United States** 114–57 Canada
    - Russia 53–56 France
    - Japan 80–60 Turkey
      - Standings (after 3 games): USA 6 points, Japan 5, Russia, Turkey, France, Canada 4.
  - Group B in Toulouse:
    - Australia 77–57 Argentina
    - Spain 54–55 Belgium
    - **China** 103–54 Mali
      - Standings (after 3 games): China 6 points, Belgium, Australia 5, Spain, Argentina 4, Mali 3.

==== Cricket ====
- India in Sri Lanka:
  - 1st Test in Galle, day 1:
    - Sri Lanka 256/2 (68 overs; Tharanga Paranavitana 110*, Kumar Sangakkara 103); India.

==== Cycling ====
- Grand Tours:
  - Tour de France:
    - Stage 14: (gold) Christophe Riblon (FRA) (Ag2r–La Mondiale) 4h 52' 42" (silver) Denis Menchov (RUS) (Rabobank) + 54" (bronze) Samuel Sánchez (ESP) (Euskaltel–Euskadi) + 54"
      - General classification: (1) Andy Schleck (LUX) (Team Saxo Bank) 68h 02' 30" (2) Alberto Contador (ESP) (Astana) + 31" (3) Sánchez + 2' 31"

==== Darts ====
- PDC Major:
  - World Matchplay, day 2:
    - First round: (ENG unless stated otherwise)
      - **Co Stompé** (NED) def. Andy Hamilton 12–10
      - **Mark Webster** (WAL) def. Adrian Lewis 11–9
      - **James Wade** def. Andy Smith 10–8
      - **Alan Tabern** def. Wes Newton 12–10

==== Equestrianism ====
- Dressage:
  - Großer Dressurpreis von Aachen – Grand Prix Freestyle (CDIO 5*) in Aachen: (gold) Edward Gal (NED) on Totilas (silver) Adelinde Cornelissen (NED) on Parzival (bronze) Imke Schellekens-Bartels (NED) on Sunrise
- Show jumping:
  - Großer Preis von Aachen in Aachen (CSIO 5*): (gold) Eric Lamaze (CAN) on Hickstead (silver) Pius Schwizer (SUI) on Carlina (bronze) Sergio Alvarez Moya (ESP) on Action-Breaker

==== Fencing ====
- European Championships in Leipzig, Germany:
  - Men's Foil individual:
    - Final: (gold) **Andrea Baldini** (ITA) def. (silver) Valerio Aspromonte (ITA) 15–11
      - (bronze) Renal Ganeev (RUS) & Richard Kruse (GBR)
  - Women's Epée individual:
    - Final: (gold) **Imke Duplitzer** (GER) def. (silver) Magdalena Piekarska (POL) 15–10
      - (bronze) Laura Flessel-Colovic (FRA) & Noam Mills (ISR)

==== Field hockey ====
- Women's Champions Trophy in Nottingham, England:
  - Place 5/6: China 3–4 **New Zealand**
  - Place 3/4: (bronze) **England** 2–1 Germany
  - Final: (silver) Netherlands 2–4 (gold) **Argentina**
    - Argentina win their third consecutive title and fourth overall.

==== Football (soccer) ====
- UEFA European Under-19 Championship in France:
  - Group A:
    - Austria 2–3 England
    - France 4–1 Netherlands
  - Group B:
    - Croatia 1–2 Spain
    - Italy 0–2 Portugal
- CAF Champions League group stage, matchday 1:
  - Group A: Dynamos (Zimbabwe) 0–2 (Democratic Republic of the Congo) TP Mazembe
  - Group B:
    - Ismaily (Egypt) 0–1 (Algeria) JS Kabylie
    - Heartland (Nigeria) 1–1 (Egypt) Al-Ahly
- CAF Confederation Cup Play-off for group stage, first leg:
  - Al-Hilal (Sudan) 5–0 (Zimbabwe) CAPS United

==== Golf ====
- Men's majors:
  - The Open Championship in St. Andrews, Scotland: (ENG unless stated)
    - (1) Louis Oosthuizen (RSA) 272 (−16) (2) Lee Westwood 279 (−9) (3) Paul Casey, Rory McIlroy (NIR) and Henrik Stenson (SWE) 280 (−8)
      - Oosthuizen wins his first major, and becomes the first South African to win a major since Trevor Immelman won the 2008 U.S. Masters.
- PGA Tour:
  - Reno-Tahoe Open in Reno, Nevada:
    - Winner: Matt Bettencourt (USA) 277 (−11)
      - Bettencourt wins his first PGA Tour event.

==== Motorcycle racing ====
- Moto GP:
  - German motorcycle Grand Prix in Saxony, Germany:
    - MotoGP: (1) Dani Pedrosa (ESP) (Honda) (2) Jorge Lorenzo (ESP) (Yamaha) (3) Casey Stoner (AUS) (Ducati)
      - Riders' championship standings (after 8 of 18 rounds): (1) Lorenzo 185 points (2) Pedrosa 138 (3) Andrea Dovizioso (ITA) (Honda) 102
      - Manufacturers' championship standings: (1) Yamaha 190 points (2) Honda 162 (3) Ducati 113
    - Moto2: (1) Toni Elías (ESP) (Moriwaki) (2) Andrea Iannone (ITA) (Speed Up) (3) Roberto Rolfo (ITA) (Suter)
      - Riders' championship standings (after 8 of 17 rounds): (1) Elías 136 points (2) Thomas Lüthi (SUI) (Moriwaki) 94 (3) Iannone 90
      - Manufacturers' championship standings: (1) Moriwaki 161 points (2) Suter 143 (3) Speed Up 106
    - 125cc: (1) Marc Márquez (ESP) (Derbi) (2) Tomoyoshi Koyama (JPN) (Aprilia) (3) Sandro Cortese (GER) (Derbi)
      - Riders' championship standings (after 8 of 17 rounds): (1) Márquez 157 points (2) Pol Espargaró (ESP) (Derbi) 131 (3) Nicolás Terol (ESP) (Aprilia) 118
      - Manufacturers' championship standings: (1) Derbi 195 points (2) Aprilia 161 (3) Honda 11

==== Open water swimming ====
- World Championships in Lac Saint-Jean, Quebec, Canada:
  - Men's 10K: (gold) Valerio Cleri (ITA) (silver) Evgeny Drattsev (RUS) (bronze) Vladimir Dyatchin (RUS)

==== Tennis ====
- ATP World Tour:
  - MercedesCup in Stuttgart, Germany:
    - Final: **Albert Montañés** (ESP) def. Gaël Monfils (FRA) 6–2, 1–2, ret.
      - Montanes wins his second title of the year and fifth of his career.
  - Swedish Open in Båstad, Sweden:
    - Final: **Nicolás Almagro** (ESP) def. Robin Söderling (SWE) 7–5, 3–6, 6–2
      - Almagro wins the sixth title of his career.
- WTA Tour:
  - Internazionali Femminili di Palermo in Palermo, Italy:
    - Final: **Kaia Kanepi** (EST) def. Flavia Pennetta (ITA) 6–4, 6–3
      - Kanepi wins the first title of her career.
  - ECM Prague Open in Prague, Czech Republic:
    - Final: **Ágnes Szávay** (HUN) def. Barbora Záhlavová-Strýcová (CZE) 6–2, 1–6, 6–2
      - Szávay wins her second title in successive weeks and the fifth title of her career.

==== Volleyball ====
- Women's European League, Week 7: (teams in **bold** advance to the Final Four)
  - Pool A: **Bulgaria** 2–3 **Serbia**
    - Final standings: Serbia 23 points, Bulgaria 21, Romania 16, Great Britain 12.
  - Pool B: **Turkey** 3–0 Spain
    - Final standings: Turkey 21 points, **Israel** 20, Spain 18, Greece 13.
- Women's Central American and Caribbean Games in Mayagüez, Puerto Rico:
  - Group A:
    - Trinidad and Tobago 3–0 Barbados
    - Dominican Republic 3–0 Costa Rica
  - Group B:
    - Mexico 3–0 Guatemala
    - Puerto Rico 3–0 Nicaragua

==== Water polo ====
- FINA Men's World League Super Final in Niš, Serbia:
  - 7th place playoff: **China** 11–5 South Africa
  - 5th place playoff: **United States** 7–6 Spain
  - 3rd place playoff: (bronze) **Croatia** 9–7 Australia
  - Final: (gold) **Serbia** 10–10 (4–2 pen.) (silver) Montenegro
    - Serbia win the title for the fifth time.

=== July 17, 2010 (Saturday) ===
==== Auto racing ====
- Nationwide Series:
  - Missouri-Illinois Dodge Dealers 250 in Madison, Illinois: (1) Carl Edwards (Ford; Roush Fenway Racing) (2) (Georgia (U.S. state)) Reed Sorenson (Toyota; Braun Racing) (3) (Tennessee) Trevor Bayne (Toyota; Diamond-Waltrip Racing)
    - Drivers' championship standings (after 19 of 35 races): (1) (Michigan) Brad Keselowski (Dodge; Penske Racing) 3042 points (2) Edwards 2814 (3) (Illinois) Justin Allgaier (Dodge; Penske Racing) 2545
    - Edwards was docked 60 points on July 21, extending Keselowski's championship lead to 228, after intentionally crashing into Keselowski on the final lap of the race. He was also fined $60,000 and placed on probation for the rest of the season. Keselowski was also placed on a similar probation to the end of the season. (ESPN)

==== Basketball ====
- FIBA Under-17 World Championship for Women in France:
  - Group A in Rodez:
    - Canada 80–87 Japan
    - Russia 38–82 United States
    - France 51–54 Turkey
      - Standings (after 2 games): USA 4 points, Russia, Japan, Canada, Turkey 3, France 2.
  - Group B in Toulouse:
    - Argentina 55–53 Belgium
    - Australia 75–92 China
    - Mali 42–112 Spain
      - Standings (after 2 games): China 4 points, Argentina, Belgium, Australia, Spain 3, Mali 2.
- FIBA Europe Under-20 Championship for Women in Latvia: (teams in **bold** advance to Qualifying Round)
  - Group A in Liepāja:
    - Bulgaria 32–63 **Netherlands**
    - **Poland** 31–80 **France**
      - Final standings: France 6 points, Poland 5, Netherlands 4, Bulgaria 3.
  - Group B in Liepāja:
    - Sweden 71–61 **Russia**
    - **Ukraine** 61–90 **Latvia**
      - Final standings: Russia, Latvia 5 points, Ukraine, Sweden 4.
  - Group C in Grobiņa:
    - **Italy** 49–35 Germany
    - **Serbia** 67–75 **Spain**
      - Final standings: Spain 6 points, Serbia 5, Italy 4, Germany 3.
  - Group D in Grobiņa:
    - **Belarus** 89–63 Romania
    - **Turkey** 64–62 **Lithuania**
      - Final standings: Turkey 6 points, Lithuania 5, Belarus 4, Romania 3.

==== Cycling ====
- Grand Tours:
  - Tour de France:
    - Stage 13: (gold) Alexander Vinokourov (KAZ) (Astana) 4h 26' 26" (silver) Mark Cavendish (GBR) (Team HTC–Columbia) + 13" (bronze) Alessandro Petacchi (ITA) (Lampre–Farnese) + 13"
      - General classification: (1) Andy Schleck (LUX) (Team Saxo Bank) 63h 08' 40" (2) Alberto Contador (ESP) (Astana) + 31" (3) Samuel Sánchez (ESP) (Euskaltel–Euskadi) + 2' 45"

==== Darts ====
- PDC Major:
  - World Matchplay, day 1:
    - First round: (ENG unless stated otherwise)
      - **Raymond van Barneveld** (NED) def. Denis Ovens 10–1
      - **Vincent van der Voort** (NED) def. Dennis Priestley 10–6
      - **Ronnie Baxter** def. Jamie Caven 10–7
      - **Wayne Jones** def. Colin Osborne 10–8

==== Equestrianism ====
- Eventing:
  - CICO 3* in Aachen:
    - Team result (Nations Cup of Germany): (gold) Germany (Michael Jung on River of Joy, Ingrid Klimke on FRH Butts Abraxxas, Andreas Dibowski on Butts Leon, Dirk Schrade on King Artus) (silver) Sweden (Linda Algotsson on Stand By Me, Niklas Jonsson on First Lady, Katrin Norling on Pandora Emm, Malin Larsson on Piccadilly Z) (bronze) (United Kingdom) Great Britain (Emily Baldwin on Drivetime, Ruth Edge on Carnaval Prince II, Pippa Funnell on Mirage d'Elle, Nicola Wilson on Bee Diplomatic)
    - Individual result: (gold) Andrew Nicholson (NZL) on Nereo (silver) Dibowski (bronze) Schrade
- Dressage:
  - Aachen (CDIO 5*):
    - Nations Cup of Germany: (gold) Netherlands (Adelinde Cornelissen on Parzival, Edward Gal on Totilas, Imke Schellekens-Bartels on Sunrise) (silver) Germany (Christoph Koschel on Donnperignon, Matthias-Alexander Rath on Sterntaler-UNICEF, Isabell Werth on Satchmo) (bronze) (United Kingdom) Great Britain (Laura Bechtolsheimer on Mistral Hojris, Fiona Bigwood on Wie-Atlántico de Ymas, Emile Faurie on Elmegardens Marequis)
    - Grand Prix Spécial (individual result): (gold) Gal (silver) Cornelissen (bronze) Bechtolsheimer
- Four-in-hand-driving:
  - Nations Cup of Germany in Aachen (CAIO):
    - Team result: (gold) Netherlands (IJsbrand Chardon, Koos de Ronde, Theo Timmerman) (silver) Germany (Michael Brauchle, Rainer Duen, Christoph Sandmann) (bronze) Switzerland (Felix Affrini, Werner Ulrich, Daniel Würgler)
    - Individual result: (gold) Boyd Exell (AUS) (silver) Chardon (bronze) Sandmann
- Show jumping:
  - Best of Champions in Aachen (CSIO 5*): (gold) Kevin Staut (FRA) (silver) Jos Lansink (BEL) (bronze) Denis Lynch (IRL)

==== Fencing ====
- European Championships in Leipzig, Germany:
  - Men's Sabre Individual:
    - Final: (gold) **Aleksey Yakimenko** (RUS) def. (silver) Nicolas Limbach (GER) 15–13
    - (bronze) Oleh Shturbabin (UKR) & Boladé Apithy (FRA)
  - Women's Foil Individual:
    - Final: (gold) **Valentina Vezzali** (ITA) def. (silver) Yevgeniya Lamonova (RUS) 15–4
    - (bronze) Inna Deriglazova (RUS) & Elisa Di Francisca (ITA)

==== Field hockey ====
- Women's Champions Trophy in Nottingham, England: (teams in **bold** advance to the final)
  - **Netherlands** 1–0 Germany
  - New Zealand 2–2 England
  - China 3–4 **Argentina**
    - Final standings: Netherlands 12 points, Argentina, England 10, Germany 7, China 3, New Zealand 1.

==== Football (soccer) ====
- FIFA U-20 Women's World Cup in Germany: (teams in **bold** advance to the quarterfinals, teams in ~~strike~~ are eliminated)
  - Group C:
    - Nigeria 2–1 Japan
    - England 0–1 Mexico
      - Standings (after 2 matches): Mexico, Nigeria 4 points, Japan, England 1.
  - Group D:
    - Ghana 2–4 **South Korea**
    - United States 5–0 ~~Switzerland~~
      - Standings (after 2 matches): Korea Republic 6 points, USA 4, Ghana 1, Switzerland 0.
- CAF Confederation Cup Play-off for group stage, first leg:
  - Al-Merreikh (Sudan) 2–2 (Niger) ASFAN
  - Atlético Petróleos Luanda (Angola) 0–0 (Tunisia) CS Sfaxien
  - Zanaco (Zambia) 4–0 (Nigeria) Enyimba
  - Gaborone United (Botswana) 1–0 (Egypt) Haras El Hodood
  - Supersport United (South Africa) 2–1 (Morocco) FUS Rabat
  - Djoliba (Mali) 0–0 (Algeria) CR Belouizdad

==== Golf ====
- Men's majors:
  - The Open Championship in St Andrews, Fife, Scotland:
    - Leaderboard after third round: (1) Louis Oosthuizen (RSA) 201 (−15) (2) Paul Casey (ENG) 205 (−11) (3) Martin Kaymer (GER) 208 (−8)

==== Open water swimming ====
- World Championships in Lac Saint-Jean, Quebec, Canada:
  - Women's 10K: (gold) Martina Grimaldi (ITA) (silver) Giorgia Consiglio (ITA) (bronze) Fang Yanqiao (CHN)

==== Rugby league ====
- European Shield in Hochspeyer:
  - Germany 96–0 Czech Republic

==== Rugby union ====
- 2011 Rugby World Cup qualifying:
  - Final Place Play-off Preliminary round:
    - **Romania** 56–13 Tunisia in Buzău
    - **Uruguay** 44–7 Kazakhstan in Montevideo
- Tri Nations Series:
  - New Zealand 31–17 South Africa in Wellington
    - Standings: New Zealand 10 points (2 matches), Australia 0 (0), South Africa 0 (2)

==== Volleyball ====
- Men's European League Final Four in Guadalajara, Spain:
  - Bronze medal match: Romania 2–3 (bronze) **Turkey**
  - Final: (gold) **Portugal** 3–1 (silver) Spain
    - Portugal win the title for the first time.
- Women's European League, Week 7: (teams in **bold** advance to the Final Four, teams in ~~strike~~ are eliminated)
  - Pool A: **Bulgaria** 0–3 **Serbia**
    - Standings: Serbia 21 points (11 matches), Bulgaria 20 (11), ~~Romania~~ 16 (12), ~~Great Britain~~ 12 (12).
  - Pool B:
    - **Turkey** 3–0 ~~Spain~~
    - ~~Greece~~ 0–3 **Israel**
      - Standings: Israel 20 points (12 matches), Turkey 19 (11), Spain 17 (11), Greece 13 (12).

==== Water polo ====
- FINA Men's World League Super Final in Niš, Serbia:
  - Semi-finals:
    - Croatia 11–14 **Serbia**
    - Australia 6–8 **Montenegro**
  - 5th–8th places:
    - **United States** 13–6 China
    - **Spain** 12–1 South Africa

=== July 16, 2010 (Friday) ===
==== Athletics ====
- IAAF Diamond League:
  - Meeting Areva in Paris, France:
    - Men:
      - 100m: Usain Bolt (JAM) 9.84
      - 400m: Jeremy Wariner (USA) 44.49
      - 800m: Abubaker Kaki Khamis (SUD) 1:43.50
      - 110m hurdles: David Oliver (USA) 12.89
      - 3000m steeplechase: Brimin Kipruto (KEN) 8:00.90
      - 4 × 100 m relay: (United Kingdom) Great Britain 38.70
      - Javelin throw: Andreas Thorkildsen (NOR) 87.50 m
      - Pole vault: Renaud Lavillenie (FRA) 5.91 m
      - Triple jump: Arnie David Giralt (CUB) 17.49 m
    - Women:
      - 200m: Allyson Felix (USA) 22.14
      - 1500m: Anna Alminova (RUS) 3:57.65
      - 5000m: Vivian Cheruiyot (KEN) 14:27.41
      - Discus throw: Yarelis Barrios (CUB) 65.53 m
      - High jump: Blanka Vlašić (CRO) 2.02 m
      - Long jump: Brittney Reese (USA) 6.79 m
      - Shot put: Nadzeya Astapchuk (BLR) 20.78 m

==== Basketball ====
- FIBA Under-17 World Championship for Women in France:
  - Group A in Rodez:
    - Japan 68–93 Russia
    - Turkey 73–82 Canada
    - United States 70–45 France
  - Group B in Toulouse:
    - China 72–54 Argentina
    - Belgium 80–27 Mali
    - Spain 57–58 Australia
- FIBA Europe Under-20 Championship for Women in Latvia: (teams in **bold** advance to Qualifying Round)
  - Group A in Liepāja:
    - **Poland** 50–40 Bulgaria
    - **France** 83–52 Netherlands
      - Standings (after 2 games): France, Poland 4 points, Bulgaria, Netherlands 2.
  - Group B in Liepāja:
    - Sweden 58–89 **Ukraine**
    - **Russia** 73–68 (OT) **Latvia**
      - Standings (after 2 games): Russia 4 points, Latvia, Ukraine 3, Sweden 2.
  - Group C in Grobiņa:
    - **Serbia** 80–60 Italy
    - **Spain** 79–43 Germany
      - Standings (after 2 games): Serbia, Spain 4 points, Italy, Germany 2.
  - Group D in Grobiņa:
    - **Turkey** 75–61 Belarus
    - **Lithuania** 77–36 Romania
      - Standings (after 2 games): Lithuania, Turkey 4 points, Belarus, Romania 2.

==== Cricket ====
- Australia vs Pakistan in England
  - 1st Test in London, day 4:
    - Australia 253 (76.5 overs) and 334 (91 overs); Pakistan 148 (40.5 overs) and 289 (91.1 overs). **Australia win by 150 runs; lead 2-match series 1–0.**
- Bangladesh in Ireland:
  - 2nd ODI in Stormont, Belfast:
    - Ireland 189/9 (46/46 overs); Bangladesh 191/4 (37.4 overs). **Bangladesh win by 6 wickets (D/L); 2-match series drawn 1–1.**

==== Cycling ====
- Grand Tours:
  - Tour de France:
    - Stage 12: (gold) Joaquim Rodríguez (ESP) (Team Katusha) 4h 58' 26" (silver) Alberto Contador (ESP) (Astana) s.t. (bronze) Alexander Vinokourov (KAZ) (Astana) + 4"
      - General classification: (1) Andy Schleck (LUX) (Team Saxo Bank) 58h 42' 01" (2) Contador + 31" (3) Samuel Sánchez (ESP) (Euskaltel–Euskadi) + 2' 45"

==== Football (soccer) ====
- FIFA U-20 Women's World Cup in Germany: (teams in **bold** advance to the semifinals, teams in ~~strike~~ are eliminated)
  - Group A:
    - ~~Costa Rica~~ 0–2 France
    - **Germany** 3–1 Colombia
      - Standings (after 2 matches): Germany 6 points, France 4, Colombia 1, Costa Rica 0 .
  - Group B:
    - Brazil 1–1 Sweden
    - **North Korea** 2–1 ~~New Zealand~~
      - Standings (after 2 matches): Korea DPR 6 points, Sweden 4, Brazil 1, New Zealand 0.
- CAF Champions League group stage, matchday 1:
  - Group A: ES Sétif (Algeria) 0–1 (Tunisia) Espérance ST
- CAF Confederation Cup Play-off for group stage, first leg:
  - Ittihad (Libya) 2–0 (Angola) Primeiro de Agosto

==== Golf ====
- Men's majors:
  - The Open Championship in St Andrews, Fife, Scotland:
    - Leaderboard after second day (ENG unless stated): (1) Louis Oosthuizen (RSA) 132 (−12) (2) Mark Calcavecchia (USA) 137 (−7) (3) Paul Casey, Lee Westwood 138 (−6) and Steven Tiley −6 after 10 holes
      - 30 players will complete their second round on July 17.

==== Volleyball ====
- Men's European League Final Four in Guadalajara, Spain:
  - Semifinals:
    - Romania 2–3 **Portugal**
    - **Spain** 3–0 Turkey
- Women's European League, Week 7: (teams in **bold** advance to the Final Four, teams in ~~strike~~ are eliminated)
  - Pool B: ~~Greece~~ 2–3 Israel
    - Standings: Israel 18 points (11 matches), **Turkey** 17 (10), Spain 16 (10), Greece 12 (11).

==== Water polo ====
- FINA Men's World League Super Final in Niš, Serbia:
  - Quarter-finals:
    - United States 11–13 **Croatia**
    - Spain 5–6 **Australia**
    - **Montenegro** 21–2 South Africa
    - China 4–17 **Serbia**

=== July 15, 2010 (Thursday) ===
==== Cricket ====
- Australia vs Pakistan in England:
  - 1st Test in London, day 3:
    - Australia 253 (76.5 overs) and 334 (91 overs); Pakistan 148 (40.5 overs) and 114/1 (37 overs). Pakistan require another 326 runs with 9 wickets remaining.
- Bangladesh in Ireland:
  - 1st ODI in Stormont, Belfast:
    - Bangladesh 234/9 (50 overs; Junaid Siddique 100); Ireland 235/3 (45 overs; William Porterfield 108). **Ireland win by 7 wickets; lead 2-match series 1–0.**

==== Cycling ====
- Grand Tours:
  - Tour de France:
    - Stage 11: (gold) Mark Cavendish (GBR) (Team HTC–Columbia) 4h 42' 29" (silver) Alessandro Petacchi (ITA) (Lampre–Farnese) s.t. (bronze) Tyler Farrar (USA) (Garmin–Transitions) s.t.
      - General classification: (1) Andy Schleck (LUX) (Team Saxo Bank) 53h 43' 25" (2) Alberto Contador (ESP) (Astana) + 41" (3) Samuel Sánchez (ESP) (Euskaltel–Euskadi) + 2' 45"

==== Equestrianism ====
- Show jumping:
  - Meydan FEI Nations Cup:
    - 6th competition: FEI Nations Cup of Germany in Aachen (CSIO 5*): (gold) Ireland (Dermott Lennon on Hallmark Elite, Denis Lynch on Lantinus, Cian O'Connor on K Club Lady, Billy Twomey on Tinka's Serenade) (silver) Germany (Ludger Beerbaum on Gotha, Marcus Ehning on Plot Blue, Marco Kutscher on Cash, Janne Friederike Meyer on Cellagon Lambrasco) (bronze) United States (Lauren Hough on Quick Study, Candice King on Skara Glen's Davos, Laura Kraut on Cedric, Nicole Simpson on Tristan)
      - Standings (after 6 of 8 competitions): (1) France 43.5 points (2) United States 31.5 (3) Ireland 28.5

==== Field hockey ====
- Women's Champions Trophy in Nottingham, England:
  - Germany 5–2 New Zealand
  - China 1–2 England
  - Argentina 4–2 Netherlands
    - Standings (after 4 matches): Netherlands, England 9 points, Argentina, Germany 7, China 3, New Zealand 0.

==== Football (soccer) ====
- UEFA Europa League Second qualifying round, first leg:
  - WIT Georgia (Georgia (country)) 0–6 (Czech Republic) Baník Ostrava
  - Atyrau (Kazakhstan) 0–2 (Hungary) Győri ETO
  - Valletta (Malta) 1–1 (Poland) Ruch Chorzów
  - Tauras Tauragė (Lithuania) 0–3 (Cyprus) APOEL
  - Rabotnički (North Macedonia) 1–0 (Armenia) Mika
  - OFK Beograd (Serbia) 2–2 (Belarus) Torpedo Zhodino
  - Zestafoni (Georgia (country)) 3–0 (Slovakia) Dukla Banská Bystrica
  - Olimpia (Moldova) 0–2 (Romania) Dinamo București
  - MYPA (Finland) 3–0 (Andorra) UE Sant Julià
  - IF Elfsborg (Sweden) 2–1 (Moldova) Iskra-Stal
  - Honka (Finland) 1–1 (Wales) Bangor City
  - Gorica (Slovenia) 0–3 (Denmark) Randers
  - Ventspils (Latvia) 0–0 (North Macedonia) Teteks
  - Baku (Azerbaijan) 2–1 (Montenegro) Budućnost Podgorica
  - Dinamo Minsk (Belarus) 5–1 (Estonia) Sillamäe Kalev
  - Austria Wien 2–2 (Bosnia and Herzegovina) Široki Brijeg
  - Anorthosis (Cyprus) 0–2 (Croatia) Šibenik
  - Gefle (Sweden) 1–2 (Georgia (country)) Dinamo Tbilisi
  - Molde (Norway) 1–0 (Latvia) Jelgava
  - Stabæk (Norway) 2–2 (Belarus) Dnepr Mogilev
  - Differdange (Luxembourg) 3–3 (Serbia) Spartak Zlatibor Voda
  - Lausanne-Sport (Switzerland) 1–0 (Bosnia and Herzegovina) Borac Banja Luka
  - Kalmar FF (Sweden) 0–0 (Moldova) Dacia
  - Cercle Brugge (Belgium) 0–1 (Finland) TPS
  - Levski Sofia (Bulgaria) 6–0 (Republic of Ireland) Dundalk
  - Beşiktaş (Turkey) 3–0 (Faroe Islands) Víkingur
  - Brøndby (Denmark) 3–0 (Liechtenstein) Vaduz
  - Šiauliai (Lithuania) 0–2 (Poland) Wisła Kraków
  - Maccabi Tel Aviv (Israel) 2–0 (Montenegro) Mogren
  - Utrecht (Netherlands) 4–0 (Albania) KF Tirana
  - Zrinjski (Bosnia and Herzegovina) 4–1 (San Marino) Tre Penne
  - Sūduva Marijampolė (Lithuania) 0–2 (Austria) Rapid Wien
  - Besa Kavajë (Albania) 0–5 (Greece) Olympiacos
  - Videoton (Hungary) 1–1 (Slovenia) Maribor
  - Cliftonville (Northern Ireland) 1–0 (Croatia) Cibalia
  - Marítimo (Portugal) 3–2 (Republic of Ireland) Sporting Fingal
  - Motherwell (Scotland) 1–0 (Iceland) Breiðablik
  - Portadown (Northern Ireland) 1–2 (Azerbaijan) Qarabağ
  - Shamrock Rovers (Republic of Ireland) 1–1 (Israel) Bnei Yehuda
  - KR Reykjavík (Iceland) 0–3 (Ukraine) Karpaty Lviv

==== Golf ====
- Men's majors:
  - The Open Championship in St Andrews, Fife, Scotland:
    - Leaderboard after first round: (1) Rory McIlroy (NIR) 63 (−9) (2) Louis Oosthuizen (RSA) 65 (−7) (3) John Daly (USA), Andrew Coltart (SCO), Steven Tiley (ENG), Bradley Dredge (WAL) and Peter Hanson (SWE) 66 (−6)
      - McIlroy breaks the course record and becomes the 22nd player to record a 63 in a major championship.

==== Water polo ====
- FINA Men's World League Super Final in Niš, Serbia:
  - Group 1:
    - Montenegro 7–7 (4–2 pen.) United States
    - China 5–11 Spain
      - Final standings: Montenegro 8 points, United States 7, Spain 3, China 0.
  - Group 2:
    - South Africa 1–22 Croatia
    - Serbia 8–6 Australia
      - Final standings: Serbia 9 points, Australia 6, Croatia 3, South Africa 0.

=== July 14, 2010 (Wednesday) ===
==== Cricket ====
- Australia vs Pakistan in England:
  - 1st Test in London, day 2:
    - Australia 253 (76.5 overs) and 100/4 (29.3 overs); Pakistan 148 (40.5 overs). Australia lead by 205 runs with 6 wickets remaining.

==== Cycling ====
- Grand Tours:
  - Tour de France:
    - Stage 10: (gold) Sérgio Paulinho (POR) (Team RadioShack) 5h 10' 56" (silver) Vasil Kiryienka (BLR) (Caisse d'Epargne) s.t. (bronze) Dries Devenyns (BEL) (Quick-Step) + 1' 29"
      - General classification: (1) Andy Schleck (LUX) (Team Saxo Bank) 49h 00' 56" (2) Alberto Contador (ESP) (Astana) + 41" (3) Samuel Sánchez (ESP) (Euskaltel–Euskadi) + 2' 45"

==== Football (soccer) ====
- FIFA U-20 Women's World Cup in Germany:
  - Group C:
    - England 1–1 Nigeria
    - Mexico 3–3 Japan
  - Group D:
    - Switzerland 0–4 South Korea
    - United States 1–1 Ghana
- UEFA Champions League Second qualifying round, first leg:
  - Aktobe (Kazakhstan) 2–0 (Georgia (country)) Olimpi Rustavi
  - BATE (Belarus) 5–1 (Iceland) FH
  - Ekranas (Lithuania) 1–0 (Finland) HJK Helsinki
  - Sheriff Tiraspol (Moldova) 3–1 (Albania) Dinamo Tirana
  - Partizan (Serbia) 3–1 (Armenia) Pyunik
  - Linfield (Northern Ireland) 0–0 (Norway) Rosenborg

==== Water polo ====
- FINA Men's World League Super Final in Niš, Serbia:
  - Group 1:
    - United States 11–5 China
    - Montenegro 11–7 Spain
      - Standings (after 2 matches): Montenegro, United States 6 points, Spain, China 0.
  - Group 2:
    - Australia 19–4 South Africa
    - Serbia 9–8 Croatia
      - Standings (after 2 matches): Serbia, Australia 6 points, Croatia, South Africa 0.

=== July 13, 2010 (Tuesday) ===
==== Baseball ====
- Major League Baseball All-Star Game in Anaheim, California:
  - National League 3, American League 1.
    - The National League win their first All-Star Game since 1996, ending the American League's 13-game unbeaten streak. Atlanta Braves catcher Brian McCann was named as Most Valuable Player, after a three-run double in the seventh inning.

==== Cricket ====
- Australia vs Pakistan in England:
  - 1st Test in London, day 1:
    - Australia 229/9 (70 overs); Pakistan.

==== Cycling ====
- Grand Tours:
  - Tour de France:
    - Stage 9: (gold) Sandy Casar (FRA) (FDJ) 5h 38' 10" (silver) Luis León Sánchez (ESP) (Caisse d'Epargne) s.t. (bronze) Damiano Cunego (ITA) (Lampre–Farnese) s.t.
      - General classification: (1) Andy Schleck (LUX) (Team Saxo Bank) 43h 35' 41" (2) Alberto Contador (ESP) (Astana) + 41" (3) Samuel Sánchez (ESP) (Euskaltel–Euskadi) + 2' 45"

==== Field hockey ====
- Women's Champions Trophy in Nottingham, England:
  - Argentina 4–0 New Zealand
  - England 2–1 Germany
  - Netherlands 2–1 China
    - Standings (after 3 matches): Netherlands 9 points, England 6, Argentina, Germany 4, China 3, New Zealand 0.

==== Football (soccer) ====
- FIFA U-20 Women's World Cup in Germany:
  - Group A:
    - Germany 4–2 Costa Rica
    - Colombia 1–1 France
  - Group B:
    - Brazil 0–1 North Korea
    - Sweden 2–1 New Zealand
- UEFA Champions League Second qualifying round, first leg:
  - Inter Baku (Azerbaijan) 0–1 (Poland) Lech Poznań
  - Liepājas Metalurgs (Latvia) 0–3 (Czech Republic) Sparta Prague
  - Levadia (Estonia) 1–1 (Hungary) Debrecen
  - Birkirkara (Malta) 1–0 (Slovakia) Žilina
  - Red Bull Salzburg (Austria) 5–0 (Faroe Islands) HB Tórshavn
  - Litex Lovech (Bulgaria) 1–0 (Montenegro) Rudar Pljevlja
  - Omonia (Cyprus) 3–0 (North Macedonia) Renova
  - AIK (Sweden) 1–0 (Luxembourg) Jeunesse Esch
  - Hapoel Tel Aviv (Israel) 5–0 (Bosnia and Herzegovina) Željezničar
  - Dinamo Zagreb (Croatia) 5–1 (Slovenia) Koper
  - Bohemians (Republic of Ireland) 1–0 (Wales) The New Saints

==== Water polo ====
- FINA Men's World League Super Final in Niš, Serbia:
  - Group 1:
    - Montenegro 16–4 China
    - United States 7–3 Spain
  - Group 2:
    - Australia 10–7 Croatia
    - Serbia 22–0 South Africa

=== July 12, 2010 (Monday) ===
==== Baseball ====
- Home Run Derby:
  - Boston Red Sox designated hitter David Ortiz defeats Florida Marlins shortstop Hanley Ramírez in the finals, 11–5, to win the event held in Anaheim, California.

==== Basketball ====
- The NCAA announces the new format for its expanded 68-team men's basketball tournament. Starting next season, the four lowest-seeded teams earning automatic bids to the tournament and the four lowest-seeded at-large entries will play in the new "First Four" round. (ESPN)

==== Cricket ====
- Bangladesh in England:
  - 3rd ODI in Birmingham:
    - England 347/7 (50 overs; Andrew Strauss 154, Jonathan Trott 110); Bangladesh 203 (45 overs). **England win by 144 runs; win 3-match series 2–1.**

=== July 11, 2010 (Sunday) ===
==== Auto racing ====
- Formula One:
  - British Grand Prix in Northamptonshire, United Kingdom: (1) Mark Webber (AUS) (Red Bull–Renault) (2) Lewis Hamilton (GBR) (McLaren–Mercedes) (3) Nico Rosberg (GER) (Mercedes)
    - Drivers' championship standings (after 10 of 19 races): (1) Hamilton 145 points (2) Jenson Button (GBR) (McLaren-Mercedes) 133 (3) Webber 128
    - Constructors' championship standings: (1) McLaren 278 points (2) Red Bull 249 (3) Ferrari 165
- V8 Supercars:
  - Sucrogen Townsville 400 in Townsville, Queensland: Race 16: (1) Mark Winterbottom (AUS) (Ford Falcon) (2) James Courtney (AUS) (Ford Falcon) (3) Garth Tander (AUS) (Holden Commodore)
    - Drivers' championship standings (after 16 of 26 races): (1) Courtney 1947 points (2) Jamie Whincup (AUS) (Holden Commodore) 1827 (3) Winterbottom 1623
- World Rally Championship:
  - Rally Bulgaria in Borovets: (1) Sébastien Loeb (FRA) / Daniel Elena (MON) (Citroën C4 WRC) (2) Dani Sordo (ESP) / Marc Martí (ESP) (Citroën C4 WRC) (3) Petter Solberg (NOR) / Chris Patterson (GBR) (Citroën C4 WRC)
    - Drivers' championship standings (after 7 of 13 rounds): (1) Loeb 151 points (2) Sébastien Ogier (FRA) (Citroën C4 WRC) 100 (3) Mikko Hirvonen (FIN) (Ford Focus RS WRC 09) 86

==== Basketball ====
- FIBA Under-17 World Championship in Hamburg, Germany:
  - 7th place playoff: **China** 65–64 Germany
  - 5th place playoff: Australia 64–74 **Serbia**
  - Bronze medal game: (bronze) **Canada** 83–81 Lithuania
  - Final: (gold) **United States** 111–80 Poland (silver)

==== Cycling ====
- Grand Tours:
  - Tour de France:
    - Stage 8: (gold) Andy Schleck (LUX) (Team Saxo Bank) 4h 54' 11" (silver) Samuel Sánchez (ESP) (Euskaltel–Euskadi) s.t. (bronze) Robert Gesink (NED) (Rabobank) + 10"
      - General classification: (1) Cadel Evans (AUS) (BMC Racing Team) 37h 57' 09" (2) Schleck + 20" (3) Alberto Contador (ESP) (Astana) + 1' 01"

==== Equestrianism ====
- Show jumping:
  - Longines Falsterbo Grand Prix in Falsterbo (CSIO 5*): (gold) Rolf-Göran Bengtsson (SWE) on Casall (silver) Malin Baryard-Johnsson (SWE) on Tornesch (bronze) Alois Pollmann-Schweckhorst (GER) on Chacco-Blue
- Vaulting:
  - Nations Cup of Germany (CVIO 2*) in Aachen: (gold) France (silver) Germany I (bronze) Germany II

==== Field hockey ====
- Women's Champions Trophy in Nottingham, England:
  - Germany 2–2 Argentina
  - England 0–3 Netherlands
  - New Zealand 1–3 China
    - Standings (after 2 matches): Netherlands 6 points, Germany 4, China, England 3, Argentina 1, New Zealand 0.

==== Football (soccer) ====
- FIFA World Cup in South Africa:
  - Final in Johannesburg: Netherlands 0–1 (a.e.t.) **Spain**
    - Andrés Iniesta's goal with four minutes left in extra time gives Spain the Cup for the first time.
    - Spain is the second team after Germany in 1974 to win the World Cup as the reigning European champion.
    - Spain is the first European team to win the Cup outside Europe, while the Netherlands lose the Final for the third time.
  - Tournament awards:
    - Golden Ball: Diego Forlán (URU)
    - Golden Shoe: Thomas Müller (GER)
    - Golden Glove: Iker Casillas (ESP)
    - Best Young Player: Thomas Müller (GER)
    - Fair Play Trophy: Spain

==== Golf ====
- Women's majors:
  - U.S. Women's Open in Oakmont, Pennsylvania:
    - Winner: Paula Creamer (USA) 281 (−3)
      - Creamer wins her first major, and her ninth LPGA Tour title.
- PGA Tour:
  - John Deere Classic in Silvis, Illinois:
    - Winner: Steve Stricker (USA) 258 (−26)
      - Stricker defends his 2009 title in this event, collecting his second tour win of the season and ninth of his career.
- European Tour:
  - Barclays Scottish Open in Luss, Argyll & Bute, Scotland:
    - Winner: Edoardo Molinari (ITA) 272 (−12)
      - Molinari wins his first European Tour title.

==== Motorcycle racing ====
- Superbike:
  - Brno Superbike World Championship round in Brno, Czech Republic:
    - Race 1: (1) Jonathan Rea (GBR) (Honda CBR1000RR) (2) Max Biaggi (ITA) (Aprilia RSV 4) (3) Cal Crutchlow (GBR) (Yamaha YZF-R1)
    - Race 2: (1) Biaggi (2) Rea (3) Michel Fabrizio (ITA) (Ducati 1098R)
      - Riders' championship standings (after 9 of 13 rounds): (1) Biaggi 352 points (2) Leon Haslam (GBR) (Suzuki GSX-R1000) 284 (3) Rea 203
      - Manufacturers' championship standings: (1) Aprilia 358 points (2) Suzuki 305 (3) Ducati 276
- Supersport:
  - Brno Supersport World Championship round in Brno, Czech Republic:
    - (1) Kenan Sofuoğlu (TUR) (Honda CBR600RR) (2) Joan Lascorz (ESP) (Kawasaki Ninja ZX-6R) (3) Chaz Davies (GBR) (Triumph Daytona 675)
      - Riders' championship standings (after 9 of 13 rounds): (1) Sofuoğlu 183 points (2) Lascorz 168 (3) Eugene Laverty (IRL) (Honda CBR600RR) 161
      - Manufacturers' championship standings: (1) Honda 220 points (2) Kawasaki 168 (3) Triumph 123

==== Snooker ====
- Players Tour Championship:
  - Event 2 in Sheffield:
    - Final: Mark Selby (ENG) def. Barry Pinches (ENG) 4–3
      - Order of Merit rankings (after 2 of 12 events): (1) Selby £10,600 (2) Mark Williams (WAL) 10,200 (3) Pinches 6,500

==== Tennis ====
- Davis Cup World Group Quarterfinals, day 3: (teams in **bold** advance to semi-finals)
  - **France** 5–0 Spain
    - Gilles Simon (FRA) def. Nicolás Almagro (ESP) 7–6(4), 7–6(7)
    - Julien Benneteau (FRA) def. Feliciano López (ESP) 7–6(3), 6–4
  - Russia 2–3 **Argentina**
    - Nikolay Davydenko (RUS) def. Eduardo Schwank (ARG) 4–6, 6–3, 6–1, 6–4
    - David Nalbandian (ARG) def. Mikhail Youzhny (RUS) 7–6(5), 6–4, 6–3
  - Croatia 1–4 **Serbia**
    - Novak Djokovic (SRB) def. Marin Čilić (CRO) 6–3, 6–3, 6–2
    - Janko Tipsarević (SRB) def. Antonio Veić (CRO) 6–2, 7–6(5)
  - Chile 1–4 **Czech Republic**
    - Jorge Aguilar (CHI) def. Lukáš Dlouhý (CZE) 6–1, 7–6(6)
    - Ivo Minář (CZE) def. Cristóbal Saavedra Corvalán (CHI) 7–6(2), 6–2
- ATP World Tour:
  - Hall of Fame Tennis Championships in Newport, Rhode Island, United States:
    - Final: **Mardy Fish** (USA) def. Olivier Rochus (BEL) 5–7, 6–3, 6–4
      - Fish wins his fourth career title.
- WTA Tour:
  - GDF Suez Grand Prix in Budapest, Hungary:
    - Final: **Ágnes Szávay** (HUN) def. Patty Schnyder (SUI) 6–2, 6–4
      - Szávay wins her fourth career title and repeats her 2009 final victory over Schnyder.

==== Volleyball ====
- Men's European League, Week 6: (teams in **bold** advance to the Final Four, teams in ~~strike~~ are eliminated)
  - Pool B: **Portugal** 3–1 **Turkey**
    - Final standings: Portugal 23 points, Turkey 18, Greece 17, Austria 14.
- Women's European League, Week 6:
  - Pool A: **Bulgaria** 3–0 ~~Great Britain~~
    - Standings: **Serbia**, Bulgaria 19 points (10 matches), Romania 16 (12), Great Britain 12 (12).
  - Pool B: **Turkey** 3–0 ~~Greece~~
    - Standings (after 10 matches): Turkey 17 points, Israel, Spain 16, Greece 11.

=== July 10, 2010 (Saturday) ===
==== Athletics ====
- IAAF Diamond League:
  - British Grand Prix in Gateshead, United Kingdom:
    - Men:
      - 100m: Tyson Gay (USA) 9.94
      - 200m: Walter Dix (USA) 20.26
      - 400m: Ricardo Chambers (JAM) 44.98
      - 1500m: Asbel Kiprop (KEN) 3:33.34
      - 5000m: Vincent Chepkok (KEN) 13:00.20
      - 110m hurdles: Dwight Thomas (JAM) 13.38
      - 3000m steeplechase: Linus Chumba (KEN) 8:19.72
      - Discus throw: Piotr Małachowski (POL) 69.83 m
      - High jump: Linus Thörnblad (SWE) 2.29 m
      - Long jump: Fabrice Lapierre (AUS) 8.20 m
      - Triple jump: Phillips Idowu (GBR) 17.38 m
    - Women:
      - 100m: Carmelita Jeter (USA) 10.95
      - 200m: Bianca Knight (USA) 22.71
      - 400m: Shericka Williams (JAM) 50.44
      - 800m: Alysia Johnson (USA) 1:59.84
      - 1500m: Lisa Dobriskey (GBR) 4:03.69
      - 100m hurdles: Lolo Jones (USA) 12.79
      - 400m hurdles: Kaliese Spencer (JAM) 54.10
      - Javelin throw: Sunette Viljoen (RSA) 64.32 m
      - Pole vault: Svetlana Feofanova (RUS) 4.71 m
      - Shot put: Nadzeya Astapchuk (BLR) 20.57 m

==== Auto racing ====
- NASCAR Sprint Cup Series:
  - LifeLock.com 400 in Joliet, Illinois: (1) (Florida) David Reutimann (Toyota; Michael Waltrip Racing) (2) (Missouri) Carl Edwards (Ford; Roush Fenway Racing) (3) (California) Jeff Gordon (Chevrolet; Hendrick Motorsports)
    - Drivers' championship standings (after 19 of 36 races): (1) (California) Kevin Harvick (Chevrolet; Richard Childress Racing) 2745 points (2) Gordon 2642 (3) (California) Jimmie Johnson (Chevrolet; Hendrick Motorsports) 2557
- V8 Supercars:
  - Sucrogen Townsville 400 in Townsville, Queensland:
    - Race 15: (1) Jamie Whincup (AUS) (Holden Commodore) (2) Garth Tander (AUS) (Holden Commodore) (3) Mark Winterbottom (AUS) (Ford Falcon)
      - Drivers' championship standings (after 15 of 26 races): (1) James Courtney (AUS) (Ford Falcon) 1809 points (2) Whincup 1791 (3) Shane van Gisbergen (NZL) (Ford Falcon) 1502

==== Basketball ====
- FIBA Under-17 World Championship in Hamburg, Germany:
  - Semifinals:
    - **United States** 103–83 Canada
    - Lithuania 65–75 **Poland**
  - 5th–8th place semifinals:
    - China 66–68 **Australia**
    - Germany 51–67 **Serbia**
  - 11th place playoff: South Korea 87–88 **Egypt**
  - 9th place playoff: **Argentina** 66–56 Spain
- WNBA All-Star Game in Uncasville, Connecticut, USA:
  - United States National Team 99, WNBA All-Stars 72
    - Sylvia Fowles of the Chicago Sky, playing for Team USA, is named MVP.

==== Cricket ====
- Bangladesh in England:
  - 2nd ODI in Bristol:
    - Bangladesh 236/7 (50 overs); England 231 (49.3 overs). **Bangladesh win by 5 runs; 3-match series level 1–1.**
- WCL Division One in the Netherlands:
  - Playoffs:
    - 5th place: Kenya 190 (50 overs); Canada 194/7 (49.2 overs) in Schiedam. **Canada win by 3 wickets.**
    - 3rd place: Netherlands 218/5 (50 overs); Afghanistan 219/5 (46 overs) in Rotterdam. **Afghanistan win by 5 wickets.**
    - Final: Scotland 232 (48.5 overs); Ireland 233/4 (44.5 overs) in Amstelveen. **Ireland win by 6 wickets.**

==== Cycling ====
- Grand Tours:
  - Tour de France:
    - Stage 7: (gold) Sylvain Chavanel (FRA) (Quick-Step) 4h 22' 52" (silver) Rafael Valls (ESP) (Footon–Servetto–Fuji) + 57" (bronze) Juan Manuel Gárate (ESP) (Rabobank) + 1' 40"
      - General classification: (1) Chavanel 33h 01' 23" (2) Cadel Evans (AUS) (BMC Racing Team) + 1' 25" (3) Ryder Hesjedal (CAN) (Garmin–Transitions) + 1' 32"

==== Equestrianism ====
- Show jumping:
  - Falsterbo Derby in Falsterbo (CSIO 5*): (gold) William Funnell (GBR) on Kanelle de la Baie (silver) Jörg Naeve (GER) on Coolidge (bronze) Shane Breen (IRL) on Dorada
- Dressage:
  - World Dressage Masters:
    - 2nd Competition: CDI 5* Falsterbo:
      - A-Final (Grand Prix Freestyle): (gold) Anky van Grunsven (NED) on Painted Black (silver) Ulla Salzgeber (GER) on Wakana (bronze) Tinne Vilhelmson-Silfven (SWE) on Favourite
        - World Dressage Masters rider ranking (after 2 competitions): (1) Anja Plönzke (GER) 1090.5 points (2) Michał Rapcewicz (POL) 855 (3) van Grunsven 765

==== Field hockey ====
- Women's Champions Trophy in Nottingham, England:
  - China 1–2 Germany
  - Argentina 1–2 England
  - Netherlands 3–1 New Zealand

==== Football (soccer) ====
- FIFA World Cup in South Africa:
  - Third place play-off in Port Elizabeth: Uruguay 2–3 (bronze) **Germany**
    - Germany repeat their 1970 third place play-off win over Uruguay, and finish third for the second straight time and fourth overall.
    - Uruguay's Diego Forlán and Germany's Thomas Müller both score their fifth goal and join the Netherlands' Wesley Sneijder and Spain's David Villa as the tournament top scorers.

==== Rugby league ====
- Test match in Prague
  - Czech Republic 16–66 Catalonia

==== Rugby union ====
- Tri Nations Series:
  - New Zealand 32–12 South Africa in Auckland

==== Snooker ====
- Players Tour Championship:
  - Reanne Evans becomes the first woman to compete in a professional event in 15 years, but she loses to Liu Chuang. (Eurosport UK)

==== Tennis ====
- Davis Cup World Group Quarterfinals, day 2: (teams in **bold** advance to semi-finals)
  - **France** 3–0 Spain
    - Julien Benneteau / Michaël Llodra (FRA) def. Feliciano López / Fernando Verdasco (ESP) 6–1, 6–2, 6–7(6), 7–6(5)
  - Russia 1–2 Argentina
    - Eduardo Schwank / Horacio Zeballos (ARG) def. Nikolay Davydenko / Igor Kunitsyn (RUS) 7–6(7), 6–4, 6–7(3), 6–1
  - Croatia 1–2 Serbia
    - Janko Tipsarević / Nenad Zimonjić (SRB) def. Ivan Dodig / Marin Čilić (CRO) 6–3, 6–2, 6–4
  - Chile 0–3 **Czech Republic**
    - Jan Hájek / Lukáš Dlouhý (CZE) def. Jorge Aguilar / Paul Capdeville (CHI) 7–6(3), 6–3, 3–6, 6–3
- WTA Tour:
  - Swedish Open in Båstad, Sweden:
    - Final: **Aravane Rezaï** (FRA) def. Gisela Dulko (ARG) 6–3, 4–6, 6–4
      - Rezaï wins her fourth career title.

==== Volleyball ====
- FIVB World League, Week 6: (teams in **bold** advance to final round)
  - Pool B: China 2–3 France
    - Final standings: **Italy** 28 points, **Serbia** 26, France 12, China 6.
  - Pool C: United States 1–3 **Russia**
    - Final standings: Russia 29 points, United States 23, Finland 12, Egypt 8.
- Men's European League, Week 6: (teams in **bold** advance to the Final Four, teams in ~~strike~~ are eliminated)
  - Pool A:
    - ~~Slovakia~~ 3–0 ~~Great Britain~~
    - **Romania** 0–3 **Spain**
      - Final standings: Spain 21 points, Romania 19, Slovakia 17, Great Britain 15.
  - Pool B:
    - ~~Greece~~ 3–0 ~~Austria~~
    - **Portugal** 3–0 **Turkey**
      - Standings: Portugal 21 points (11 matches), Turkey 17 (11), Greece 17 (12), Austria 14 (12).
- Women's European League, Week 6: (teams in **bold** advance to the Final Four, teams in ~~strike~~ are eliminated)
  - Pool A:
    - ~~Romania~~ 0–3 **Serbia**
    - Bulgaria 3–1 ~~Great Britain~~
      - Standings: Serbia 19 points (10 matches), Bulgaria 17 (9), Romania 16 (12), Great Britain 11 (11).
  - Pool B:
    - Israel 3–0 Spain
    - **Turkey** 3–1 ~~Greece~~
      - Standings: Israel, Spain 16 points (10 matches), Turkey 15 (9), Greece 10 (9).

=== July 9, 2010 (Friday) ===
==== Auto racing ====
- Nationwide Series:
  - Dollar General 300 in Joliet, Illinois: (1) (Nevada) Kyle Busch (Toyota; Joe Gibbs Racing) (2) (Connecticut) Joey Logano (Toyota; Joe Gibbs Racing) (3) (Idaho) Brian Scott (Toyota; Braun Racing)
    - Drivers' championship standings (after 18 of 35 races): (1) (Michigan) Brad Keselowski (Dodge; Penske Racing) 2911 points (2) (Missouri) Carl Edwards (Ford; Roush Fenway Racing) 2684 (3) Busch 2486

==== Basketball ====
- FIBA Under-17 World Championship in Hamburg, Germany:
  - Quarterfinals:
    - **Canada** 102–96 China
    - **United States** 105–70 Australia
    - **Lithuania** 73–61 Germany
    - **Poland** 100–70 Serbia
  - 9th–12th playoffs:
    - **Argentina** 90–77 South Korea
    - **Spain** 87–62 Egypt

==== Cricket ====
- WCL Division One in the Netherlands: (teams in **bold** advance to the final)
  - Afghanistan 141 (47.1 overs); **Scotland** 142/8 (43.5 overs) in Rotterdam. **Scotland win by 2 wickets.**
  - Kenya 153 (45.2 overs); Canada 154/4 (35.5 overs) in Schiedam. **Canada win by 6 wickets.**
  - **Ireland** 177 (48.2 overs); Netherlands 138 (38.5 overs) in Amstelveen. **Ireland win by 39 runs.**
    - Final standings: Ireland 10 points, Scotland 8, Afghanistan 6, Netherlands 4, Canada 2, Kenya 0.

==== Cycling ====
- Grand Tours:
  - Tour de France:
    - Stage 6: (gold) Mark Cavendish (GBR) (Team HTC–Columbia) 5h 37' 42" (silver) Tyler Farrar (USA) (Garmin–Transitions) s.t. (bronze) Alessandro Petacchi (ITA) (Lampre–Farnese) s.t.
      - General classification: (1) Fabian Cancellara (SUI) (Team Saxo Bank) 28h 37' 30" (2) Geraint Thomas (GBR) (Team Sky) + 20" (3) Cadel Evans (AUS) (BMC Racing Team) + 39"

==== Equestrianism ====
- Show jumping:
  - Meydan FEI Nations Cup:
    - 5th competition: FEI Nations Cup of Sweden in Falsterbo (CSIO 5*): (gold) Sweden (Malin Baryard-Johnsson on Tornesch, Helena Lundbäck on Erbblume, Peder Fredricson on Arctic Aurora Borealis, Rolf-Göran Bengtsson on Casall) (silver) Netherlands (Eric van der Vleuten on Utascha SFN, Jur Vrieling on Bubalou, Leopold van Asten on Santana B, Marc Houtzager on Tamino) (bronze) Spain (Rutherford Latham on Guarana Champeix, Manuel Añon Suarez on L'Oréal D'Utah, Fernando Fourcade on New Remake de Servery, Ricardo Jurado on Julia des Brumes) (bronze) France (Eric Navet on Kiwi du Fraigneau, Nicolas Delmotte on Luccianno, Marie Etter Pellegrin on Admirable, Kevin Staut on Silvana)
      - Standings (after 5 of 8 competitions): (1) France 39 points (2) (United Kingdom) Great Britain 27.5 (3) United States 25.5
- Dressage:
  - World Dressage Masters:
    - 2nd Competition: CDI 5* Falsterbo:
      - B-Final (Grand Prix Spécial): (gold) Jonny Hilberath (GER) on Amüsant (silver) Christa Laarakkers (NED) on Ovation (bronze) Charlotte Haid Bondergaard (SWE) on Lydianus
        - World Dressage Masters rider ranking (after 1 competition): (1) Isabell Werth (GER) 630 points (2) Valentina Truppa (ITA) 570 (3) Anja Plönzke (GER) 565.5

==== Tennis ====
- Davis Cup World Group Quarterfinals, day 1:
  - France 2–0 Spain
    - Gaël Monfils (FRA) def. David Ferrer (ESP) 7–6(3), 6–2, 4–6, 5–7, 6–4
    - Michaël Llodra (FRA) def. Fernando Verdasco (ESP) 6–7(5), 6–4, 6–3, 7–6(2)
  - Russia 1–1 Argentina
    - David Nalbandian (ARG) def. Nikolay Davydenko (RUS) 6–4, 7–6(5), 7–6(6)
    - Mikhail Youzhny (RUS) def. Leonardo Mayer (ARG) 6–3, 6–1, 6–4
  - Croatia 1–1 Serbia
    - Novak Djokovic (SRB) def. Ivan Ljubičić (CRO) 7–6(3), 6–4, 6–1
    - Marin Čilić (CRO) def. Viktor Troicki (SRB) 6–4, 7–5, 6–2
  - Chile 0–2 Czech Republic
    - Ivo Minář (CZE) def. Nicolás Massú (CHI) 6–0, 6–2, 6–3
    - Jan Hájek (CZE) def. Paul Capdeville (CHI) 6–0, 6–2, 6–1

==== Volleyball ====
- FIVB World League, Week 6: (teams in **bold** advance to final round, teams in ~~strike~~ are eliminated)
  - Pool A:
    - ~~Bulgaria~~ 2–3 **Brazil**
    - ~~Netherlands~~ 3–1 ~~South Korea~~
      - Final standings: Brazil 30 points, Bulgaria 26, Netherlands 16, South Korea 0.
  - Pool B: ~~China~~ 2–3 ~~France~~
    - Standings: **Italy** 28 points (12 matches), Serbia 26 (12), France 10 (11), China 5 (11).
  - Pool C: United States 3–0 **Russia**
    - Standings: Russia 26 points (11 matches), United States 23 (11), ~~Finland~~ 12 (12), ~~Egypt~~ 8 (12).
  - Pool D:
    - ~~Poland~~ 3–1 ~~Germany~~
    - **Argentina** 0–3 **Cuba**
      - Final standings: Cuba 29 points, Germany 21, Poland 19, Argentina 3.
- Men's European League, Week 6: (teams in **bold** advance to the Final Four, teams in ~~strike~~ are eliminated)
  - Pool A:
    - ~~Slovakia~~ 3–0 ~~Great Britain~~
    - **Romania** 2–3 **Spain**
      - Standings (after 11 matches): Spain 19 points, Romania 18, Slovakia 15, Great Britain 14.
  - Pool B: ~~Greece~~ 3–1 ~~Austria~~
    - Standings: **Portugal** 19 points (10 matches), **Turkey** 16 (10), Greece 15 (11), Austria 13 (11).
- Women's European League, Week 6: (teams in **bold** advance to the Final Four, teams in ~~strike~~ are eliminated)
  - Pool A: ~~Romania~~ 0–3 Serbia
    - Standings: Serbia 17 points (9 matches), Bulgaria 15 (8), Romania 15 (11), ~~Great Britain~~ 10 (10).
  - Pool B: Israel 3–1 Spain
    - Standings: Spain 15 points (9 matches), Israel 14 (9), **Turkey** 13 (8), ~~Greece~~ 9 (8).

=== July 8, 2010 (Thursday) ===
==== Athletics ====
- IAAF Diamond League:
  - Athletissima in Lausanne, Switzerland:
    - Men:
      - 100m: Usain Bolt (JAM) 9.82
      - 200m: Walter Dix (USA) 19.86
      - 400m: Jeremy Wariner (USA) 44.57
      - 800m: David Rudisha (KEN) 1:43.25
      - 1500m: Nicholas Kemboi (KEN) 3:31.52
      - 110m hurdles: Dayron Robles (CUB) 13.01
      - 400m hurdles: Bershawn Jackson (USA) 47.62
      - 3000m steeplechase: Brimin Kipruto (KEN) 8:01.62
      - High jump: Ivan Ukhov (RUS) 2.33 m
      - Javelin throw: Andreas Thorkildsen (NOR) 87.03 m
      - Pole vault: Renaud Lavillenie (FRA) 5.85 m
    - Women:
      - 100m: Carmelita Jeter (USA) 10.99
      - 400m: Debbie Dunn (USA) 49.81
      - 1500m: Gelete Burka (ETH) 3:59.28
      - 3000m: Vivian Cheruiyot (KEN) 8:34.58
      - 100m hurdles: Priscilla Lopes-Schliep (CAN) 12.56
      - Discus throw: Yarelis Barrios (CUB) 65.92 m
      - Long jump: Brittney Reese (USA) 6.94 m
      - Triple jump: Yargelis Savigne (CUB) 14.99 m

==== Basketball ====
- NBA news:
  - Two-time MVP LeBron James, whose contract with the Cleveland Cavaliers expired at the end of the 2009–10 season, announces that he will sign with the Miami Heat for the 2010–11 season. (ESPN)

==== Cricket ====
- Bangladesh in England:
  - 1st ODI in Nottingham:
    - Bangladesh 250/9 (50 overs); England 251/4 (45.1 overs). **England win by 6 wickets; lead 3-match series 1–0.**

==== Cycling ====
- Grand Tours:
  - Tour de France:
    - Stage 5: (gold) Mark Cavendish (GBR) (Team HTC–Columbia) 4h 30' 50" (silver) Gerald Ciolek (GER) (Team Milram) s.t. (bronze) Edvald Boasson Hagen (NOR) (Team Sky) s.t.
      - General classification: (1) Fabian Cancellara (SUI) (Team Saxo Bank) 22h 59' 45" (2) Geraint Thomas (GBR) (Team Sky) + 23" (3) Cadel Evans (AUS) (BMC Racing Team) + 39"

==== Football (soccer) ====
- UEFA Europa League First qualifying round, second leg: (first leg score in parentheses)
  - **Mogren** (Montenegro) 2–0 (3–0) (Andorra) UE Santa Coloma. Mogren win 5–0 on aggregate.
  - **Široki Brijeg** (Bosnia and Herzegovina) 3–0 (2–0) (Slovenia) Olimpija. Široki Brijeg win 5–0 on aggregate.
  - Banants (Armenia) 0–1 (0–3) (Cyprus) **Anorthosis**. Anorthosis win 4–0 on aggregate.
  - Khazar (Azerbaijan) 1–1 (0–0) (Moldova) **Olimpia**. 1–1 on aggregate, Olimpia win on away goals rule.
  - Sliema Wanderers (Malta) 0–3 (0–0) (Croatia) **Šibenik**. Šibenik win 3–0 on aggregate.
  - **Zrinjski** (Bosnia and Herzegovina) 2–1 (2–1) (Kazakhstan) Tobol. Zrinjski win 4–2 on aggregate.
  - **Bnei Yehuda** (Israel) 1–0 (0–0) (Armenia) Ulisses. Bnei Yehuda win 1–0 on aggregate.
  - Lusitanos (Andorra) 0–6 (0–5) (North Macedonia) **Rabotnički**. Rabotnički win 11–0 on aggregate.
  - Zalaegerszeg (Hungary) 0–1 (a.e.t.) (0–0) (Albania) **KF Tirana**. KF Tirana win 1–0 on aggregate.
  - Faetano (San Marino) 0–0 (0–5) (Georgia (country)) **Zestafoni**. Zestafoni win 5–0 on aggregate.
  - **Gefle** (Sweden) 2–1 (2–0) (Faroe Islands) NSÍ Runavík. Gefle win 4–1 on aggregate.
  - Fylkir (Iceland) 1–3 (0–3) (Belarus) **Torpedo Zhodino**. Torpedo Zhodino win 6–1 on aggregate.
  - F91 Dudelange (Luxembourg) 2–1 (1–6) (Denmark) **Randers**. Randers win 7–3 on aggregate.
  - Skonto (Latvia) 0–1 (1–1) (Northern Ireland) **Portadown**. Portadown win 2–1 on aggregate.
  - **TPS** (Finland) 4–0 (3–1) (Wales) Port Talbot Town. TPS win 7–1 on aggregate.
  - Glentoran (Northern Ireland) 2–2 (0–3) (Iceland) **KR Reykjavík**. KR Reykjavík win 5–2 on aggregate.
  - **Dundalk** (Republic of Ireland) 2–1 (3–3) (Luxembourg) Grevenmacher. Dundalk win 5–4 on aggregate.
  - EB/Streymur (Faroe Islands) 0–3 (0–1) (Sweden) **Kalmar FF**. Kalmar FF win 4–0 on aggregate.
  - **Tauras Tauragė** (Lithuania) 3–2 (a.e.t.) (2–2) (Wales) Llanelli. Tauras Tauragė win 5–4 on aggregate.
  - **MYPA** (Finland) 5–0 (2–0) (Estonia) Narva Trans. MYPA win 7–0 on aggregate.
  - **Dacia** (Moldova) 0–0 (1–1) (Montenegro) Zeta. 1–1 on aggregate, Dacia win on away goals rule.
  - **Dnepr Mogilev** (Belarus) 7–1 (1–1) (Albania) Laçi. Dnepr Mogilev win 8–2 on aggregate.
  - **Ruch Chorzów** (Poland) 1–0 (2–1) (Kazakhstan) Shakhter Karaganda. Ruch Chorzów win 3–1 on aggregate.
  - Flora (Estonia) 0–0 (1–2) (Georgia (country)) **Dinamo Tbilisi**. Dinamo Tbilisi win 2–1 on aggregate.
  - **Győri ETO** (Hungary) 3–1 (2–2) (Slovakia) Nitra. Győri ETO win 5–3 on aggregate.
  - Metalurg Skopje (North Macedonia) 1–1 (1–4) (Azerbaijan) **Qarabağ**. Qarabağ win 5–2 on aggregate.

==== Volleyball ====
- FIVB World League, Week 6: (teams in **bold** advance to final round, teams in ~~strike~~ are eliminated)
  - Pool A:
    - Bulgaria 1–3 **Brazil**
    - ~~Netherlands~~ 3–0 ~~South Korea~~
      - Standings (after 11 matches): Brazil 28 points, Bulgaria 25, Netherlands 13, South Korea 0.
  - Pool B: Serbia 3–2 **Italy**
    - Standings: Italy 28 points (12 matches), Serbia 26 (12), ~~France~~ 8 (10), ~~China~~ 4 (10).
  - Pool C: ~~Egypt~~ 3–0 ~~Finland~~
    - Standings: Russia 26 points (10 matches), United States 20 (10), Finland 12 (12), Egypt 8 (12).
  - Pool D:
    - ~~Poland~~ 2–3 ~~Germany~~
    - **Argentina** 2–3 **Cuba**
      - Standings (after 11 matches): Cuba 26 points, Germany 21, Poland 16, Argentina 3.

=== July 7, 2010 (Wednesday) ===
==== Basketball ====
- NBA news:
  - Dwyane Wade, one of the key free agents in the league this offseason, announces that he will sign a new contract with his current team, the Miami Heat. Another key free agent, Chris Bosh, announces he will leave the Toronto Raptors and join Wade in Miami. (ESPN)
- FIBA Under-17 World Championship in Hamburg, Germany: (teams in **bold** advance to the quarterfinals)
  - Group A:
    - Egypt 72–103 **China**
    - **United States** 112–75 **Serbia**
    - **Lithuania** 74–71 Argentina
      - Final standings: USA 10 points, Lithuania 9, China 8, Serbia 7, Argentina 6, Egypt 5.
  - Group B:
    - **Poland** 75–70 **Canada**
    - **Germany** 78–68 South Korea
    - Spain 66–68 **Australia**
      - Final standings: Poland 10 points, Canada, Germany, Australia 8, Spain 6, Korea 5.

==== Cricket ====
- WCL Division One in the Netherlands: (teams in **bold** advance to the final)
  - Canada 154/9 (50 overs); **Ireland** 155/5 (39.1 overs) in Amstelveen. **Ireland win by 5 wickets.**
  - Scotland 172/8 (50 overs); Kenya 166 (48.4 overs) in Rotterdam. **Scotland win by 6 runs.**
  - Netherlands 202/8 (50 overs; Tom Cooper 101); Afghanistan 203/4 (42.3 overs) in Voorburg. **Afghanistan win by 6 wickets.**
    - Standings (after 4 matches): Ireland 8 points, Scotland, Afghanistan 6, Netherlands 4, Kenya, Canada 0.
- ICC Intercontinental Shield in Hamilton, day 3: (teams in **bold** advance to the final, teams in ~~strike~~ are eliminated)
  - ~~Bermuda~~ 56 (31.3 overs) and 332 (127.3 overs); **United Arab Emirates** 356/6d (108 overs) and 35/1 (8.3 overs). **United Arab Emirates win by 9 wickets.**
    - Standings: United Arab Emirates 37 points (3 matches), Uganda 29 (2), Namibia 26 (2), Bermuda 0 (3).

==== Cycling ====
- Grand Tours:
  - Tour de France:
    - Stage 4: (gold) Alessandro Petacchi (ITA) (Lampre–Farnese) 3h 34' 55" (silver) Julian Dean (NZL) (Garmin–Transitions) s.t. (bronze) Edvald Boasson Hagen (NOR) (Team Sky) s.t.
      - General classification: (1) Fabian Cancellara (SUI) (Team Saxo Bank) 18h 28' 55" (2) Geraint Thomas (GBR) (Team Sky) + 23" (3) Cadel Evans (AUS) (BMC Racing Team) + 39"

==== Football (soccer) ====
- FIFA World Cup in South Africa:
  - Semi-final in Durban: Germany 0–1 **Spain**
    - Spain repeat their win over Germany in the UEFA Euro 2008 Final and advance to the final for the first time.
    - Spain become the first reigning European champion to reach the final since Germany in 1982.
    - Spain and the Netherlands will meet in the first final since 1978 in which neither team has previously won the Cup.
- UEFA Champions League First qualifying round, second leg: (first leg score in parentheses)
  - **Rudar Pljevlja** (Montenegro) 4–1 (3–0) (San Marino) Tre Fiori. Rudar Pljevlja win 7–1 on aggregate.

==== Rugby league ====
- State of Origin series, Game III in Sydney:
  - New South Wales 18–23 Queensland. **Queensland win the series 3–0**.
    - Queensland win the series for the fifth straight time.
      - It is the first time since 2000 that a team has won all three games, and the first sweep for Queensland since 1995.

==== Volleyball ====
- FIVB World League, Week 6: (teams in ~~strike~~ are eliminated)
  - Pool B: Serbia 1–3 Italy
    - Standings: Italy 27 points (11 matches), Serbia 24 (11), ~~France~~ 8 (10), ~~China~~ 4 (10).
  - Pool C: ~~Egypt~~ 0–3 ~~Finland~~
    - Standings: Russia 26 points (10 matches), United States 20 (10), Finland 12 (11), Egypt 5 (11).

=== July 6, 2010 (Tuesday) ===
==== Basketball ====
- FIBA Under-17 World Championship in Hamburg, Germany: (teams in **bold** advance to the quarterfinals, teams in ~~strike~~ are eliminated)
  - Group A:
    - **China** 76–64 ~~Argentina~~
    - ~~Egypt~~ 64–132 **United States**
    - **Serbia** 71–74 **Lithuania**
      - Standings (after 4 games): USA 8 points, Lithuania 7, China, Serbia 6, Argentina 5, Egypt 4.
  - Group B:
    - **Canada** 95–74 ~~South Korea~~
    - **Poland** 88–82 (OT) Spain
    - Australia 62–58 **Germany**
      - Standings (after 4 games): Poland 8 points, Canada 7, Australia, Germany 6, Spain 5, Korea 4.
- NBA:
  - The Los Angeles Clippers reach an agreement in principle with Vinny Del Negro to take over as head coach of the team. (AP via Google News)

==== Cricket ====
- Australia vs Pakistan in England:
  - 2nd T20I in Birmingham:
    - Pakistan 162/9 (20 overs); Australia 151 (19.4 overs). **Pakistan win by 11 runs, win the 2-match series 2–0**.
- ICC Intercontinental Shield in Hamilton, day 2:
  - Bermuda 56 (31.3 overs) and 107/1 (47 overs); United Arab Emirates 356/6d (108 overs; Arshad Ali 126). Bermuda trail by 193 runs with 9 wickets remaining.

==== Cycling ====
- Grand Tours:
  - Tour de France:
    - Stage 3: (gold) Thor Hushovd (NOR) (Cervélo TestTeam) 4h 49' 38" (silver) Geraint Thomas (GBR) (Team Sky) s.t. (bronze) Cadel Evans (AUS) (BMC Racing Team) s.t.
      - General classification: (1) Fabian Cancellara (SUI) (Team Saxo Bank) 14h 54' 00" (2) Thomas + 23" (3) Evans + 39"

==== Football (soccer) ====
- FIFA World Cup in South Africa:
  - Semi-final in Cape Town: Uruguay 2–3 **Netherlands**
    - The Netherlands advance to the final for the third time, after 1974 and 1978. (BBC Sports)
    - The Netherlands' win ensures that a European team will win a World Cup staged outside Europe for the first time.
    - During a speech Fidel Castro urges Uruguay to defeat Netherlands to prevent what he describes as a final as "colourless and unhistorical as any since the sport was born in the world". (The Daily Telegraph)
- UEFA Champions League First qualifying round, second leg: (first leg score in parentheses)
  - **Birkirkara** (Malta) 4–3 (3–0) (Andorra) FC Santa Coloma. Birkirkara win 7–3 on aggregate.

=== July 5, 2010 (Monday) ===
==== Basketball ====
- FIBA Under-17 World Championship in Hamburg, Germany:
  - Group A:
    - Argentina 56–62 Serbia
    - United States 113–73 China
    - Lithuania 97–77 Egypt
      - Standings (after 3 games): USA 6 points, Serbia, Lithuania 5, Argentina, China 4, Egypt 3.
  - Group B:
    - Spain 72–79 Canada
    - South Korea 70–84 Australia
    - Germany 33–79 Poland
      - Standings (after 3 games): Poland 6 points, Canada, Germany 5, Spain, Australia 4, Korea 3.

==== Cricket ====
- Australia vs Pakistan in England:
  - 1st T20I in Birmingham:
    - Pakistan 167/8 (20 overs); Australia 144 (18.4 overs). **Pakistan win by 23 runs; lead 2-match series 1–0.**
- World Cricket League Division One in the Netherlands:
  - Kenya 233/7 (50 overs); Afghanistan 234/9 (50 overs) in Amstelveen. **Afghanistan win by 1 wicket.**
  - Scotland 117 (47.2 overs); Ireland 120/5 (34.2 overs) in Voorburg. **Ireland win by 5 wickets.**
  - Canada 168 (49.1 overs); Netherlands 169/3 (42.4 overs) in Rotterdam. **Netherlands win by 7 wickets.**
    - Standings (after 3 matches): Ireland 6 points, Netherlands, Scotland, Afghanistan 4, Canada, Kenya 0.
- ICC Intercontinental Shield in Hamilton, day 1:
  - Bermuda 56 (31.3 overs); United Arab Emirates 192/2 (61 overs). United Arab Emirates lead by 136 runs with 8 wickets remaining in the 1st innings.

==== Cycling ====
- Grand Tours:
  - Tour de France:
    - Stage 2: (gold) Sylvain Chavanel (FRA) (Quick-Step) 4h 40' 48" (silver) Maxime Bouet (FRA) (Ag2r–La Mondiale) + 3' 56" (bronze) Fabian Wegmann (GER) (Team Milram) + 3' 56"
      - General classification: (1) Chavanel 10h 01' 25" (2) Fabian Cancellara (SUI) (Team Saxo Bank) + 2' 57" (3) Tony Martin (GER) (Team HTC–Columbia) + 3' 07"

==== Football (soccer) ====
- News:
  - Brazil national team coach Dunga, along with his entire coaching staff, are sacked after the team's quarterfinal defeat by the Netherlands. (BBC Sport)
  - The Nigerian Government abandons its decision to ban its football team from international competitions, amidst threats by FIFA to expel the country from its organization. (BBC Sport)

=== July 4, 2010 (Sunday) ===
==== Auto racing ====
- IndyCar Series:
  - Camping World Grand Prix at The Glen in Watkins Glen, New York: (1) Will Power (AUS) (Team Penske) (2) Ryan Briscoe (AUS) (Team Penske) (3) Dario Franchitti (GBR) (Chip Ganassi Racing)
    - Drivers' championship standings (after 9 of 17 races): (1) Power 327 points (2) Franchitti 295 (3) Scott Dixon (NZL) (Chip Ganassi Racing) 287
- World Touring Car Championship:
  - Race of Portugal:
    - Round 9: (1) Tiago Monteiro (POR) (SR-Sport; SEAT León) (2) Yvan Muller (FRA) (Chevrolet; Chevrolet Cruze) (3) Gabriele Tarquini (ITA) (SR-Sport; SEAT León)
    - Round 10: (1) Tarquini (2) Muller (3) Alain Menu (SUI) (Chevrolet; Chevrolet Cruze)
      - Drivers' championship standings (after 10 of 22 rounds): (1) Muller 164 points (2) Tarquini 149 (3) Andy Priaulx (GBR) (BMW Team RBM; BMW 320si) 117
      - Manufacturers' championship standings: (1) Chevrolet 317 points (2) SEAT Customers Technology 312 (3) BMW 251

==== Cricket ====
- World Cricket League Division One in the Netherlands:
  - Ireland 237/9 (50 overs); Afghanistan 198 (47.1 overs) in Rotterdam. **Ireland win by 39 runs.**
    - Standings (after 2 matches): Scotland, Ireland 4 points, Netherlands, Afghanistan 2, Canada, Kenya 0.

==== Cycling ====
- Grand Tours:
  - Tour de France:
    - Stage 1: (gold) Alessandro Petacchi (ITA) (Lampre–Farnese) 5h 09' 38" (silver) Mark Renshaw (AUS) (Team HTC–Columbia) s.t. (bronze) Thor Hushovd (NOR) (Cervélo TestTeam) s.t.
      - General classification: (1) Fabian Cancellara (SUI) (Team Saxo Bank) 5h 18' 38" (2) Tony Martin (GER) (Team HTC–Columbia) + 10" (3) David Millar (GBR) (Garmin–Transitions) + 20"

==== Golf ====
- PGA Tour:
  - AT&T National in Newtown Square, Pennsylvania:
    - Winner: Justin Rose (ENG) 270 (−10)
      - Rose wins his second PGA Tour title in his last three events, and also the second of his career.
- European Tour:
  - Alstom Open de France in France:
    - Winner: Miguel Ángel Jiménez (ESP) 273 (−11)^{PO}
      - Jiménez wins his 17th European Tour title on the first playoff hole. This is also his 10th European Tour title since turning 40, extending his tour record.
- LPGA Tour:
  - Jamie Farr Owens Corning Classic in Sylvania, Ohio:
    - Winner: Na Yeon Choi (KOR) 270 (−14)^{PO}
      - Choi wins her third LPGA Tour title on the second playoff hole.
- Champions Tour:
  - Montreal Championship in Blainville, Quebec:
    - Winner: Larry Mize (USA) 199 (−17)
      - Mize wins for the first time on the senior circuit.

==== Horse racing ====
- Canadian Triple Crown:
  - Queen's Plate in Toronto:
    - (1) Big Red Mike (jockey: Eurico Rosa da Silva, trainer: Nick Gonzalez) (2) Hotep (jockey: Patrick Husbands, trainer: Mark Frostad) (3) Roan Irish (jockey: Davy Moran, trainer: Carolyn Costigan)

==== Ice hockey ====
- IIHF InLine Hockey World Championship in Karlstad, Sweden:
  - Bronze medal game: Canada 6–7 (bronze) **Sweden**
  - Gold medal game: Czech Republic (silver) 3–4 (gold) **United States**
    - United States win the title for the fifth time.

==== Motorcycle racing ====
- Moto GP:
  - Catalan motorcycle Grand Prix in Montmeló, Spain:
    - MotoGP: (1) Jorge Lorenzo (ESP) (Yamaha) (2) Dani Pedrosa (ESP) (Honda) (3) Casey Stoner (AUS) (Ducati)
      - Riders' championship standings (after 7 of 18 rounds): (1) Lorenzo 165 points (2) Pedrosa 113 (3) Andrea Dovizioso (ITA) (Honda) 91
      - Manufacturers' championship standings: (1) Yamaha 170 points (2) Honda 137 (3) Ducati 97
    - Moto2: (1) Yuki Takahashi (JPN) (Tech 3) (2) Thomas Lüthi (SUI) (Moriwaki) (3) Julián Simón (ESP) (Suter)
      - Riders' championship standings (after 7 of 17 rounds): (1) Toni Elías (ESP) (Moriwaki) 111 points (2) Lüthi 94 (3) Simón 77
      - Manufacturers' championship standings: (1) Moriwaki 136 points (2) Suter 127 (3) Speed Up 86
    - 125cc: (1) Marc Márquez (ESP) (Derbi) (2) Bradley Smith (GBR) (Aprilia) (3) Pol Espargaró (ESP) (Derbi)
      - Riders' championship standings (after 7 of 17 rounds): (1) Márquez 132 points (2) Espargaró 131 (3) Nicolás Terol (ESP) (Aprilia) 118
      - Manufacturers' championship standings: (1) Derbi 170 points (2) Aprilia 141 (3) Honda 9

==== Sumo ====
- The Japan Sumo Association has dismissed Sumo Wrestler Kotomitsuki Keiji, after allegations that he and others were involved in illegal gambling. (BBC News)

==== Tennis ====
- Grand Slams:
  - Wimbledon Championships in Wimbledon, London, United Kingdom:
    - Men's singles, final:
      - **Rafael Nadal** (ESP) [2] def. Tomáš Berdych (CZE) [12] 6–3, 7–5, 6–4
        - Nadal wins his second Wimbledon singles title and eighth Grand Slam singles title.(AFP), (BBC)
    - Mixed doubles, final:
      - **Leander Paes** (IND) / **Cara Black** (ZIM) [2] def. Wesley Moodie (RSA) / Lisa Raymond (USA) [11] 6–4, 7–6(5)
        - Paes and Black win their third Grand Slam title as a team. Paes also won three mixed doubles titles with other partners. Black won two more titles with her brother Wayne.
    - Boys' singles, final:
      - **Márton Fucsovics** (HUN) [13] def. Benjamin Mitchell (AUS) 6–4, 6–4
        - Fucsovics wins his first junior Grand Slam singles title.
    - Boys' doubles, final:
      - **Liam Broady** (GBR) / **Tom Farquharson** (GBR) def. Lewis Burton (GBR) / George Morgan (GBR) 7–6(4), 6–4
        - Broady and Farquharson win their first junior Grand Slam doubles title.
    - Girls' doubles, final:
      - **Tímea Babos** (HUN) / **Sloane Stephens** (USA) [4] def. Irina Khromacheva (RUS) / Elina Svitolina (UKR) [1] 6–7(7), 6–2, 6–2
        - Babos and Stephens win their second consecutive Grand Slam doubles title.
    - Wheelchair men's doubles, final:
      - **Robin Ammerlaan** (NED) / **Stefan Olsson** (SWE) def. Stéphane Houdet (FRA) / Shingo Kunieda (JPN) [1] 6–4, 7–6(4)
        - Ammerlaan wins his third Wimbledon title, and tenth Grand Slam title. Olsson wins his first Wimbledon title and second Grand Slam title.
    - Wheelchair women's doubles, final:
      - **Esther Vergeer** (NED) / **Sharon Walraven** (NED) [1] def. Daniela Di Toro (AUS) / Lucy Shuker (GBR) 6–2, 6–3
        - Vergeer wins her second consecutive Wimbledon doubles title, and 15th Grand Slam doubles title. Walraven wins her first Grand Slam title.
    - Men's invitation doubles, final:
      - **Donald Johnson** (USA) / **Jared Palmer** (USA) def. Wayne Ferreira (RSA) / Yevgeny Kafelnikov (RUS) 6–3, 6–2
    - Women's invitation doubles, final:
      - **Martina Navratilova** (USA) / **Jana Novotná** (CZE) def. Tracy Austin (USA) / Kathy Rinaldi-Stunkel (USA) 7–5, 6–0
    - Senior men's invitation doubles, final:
      - **Pat Cash** (AUS) / **Mark Woodforde** (AUS) def. Jeremy Bates (GBR) / Anders Järryd (SWE) 6–2, 7–6(5)

==== Volleyball ====
- FIVB World League, Week 5: (teams in **bold** advance to final round, teams in ~~strike~~ are eliminated)
  - Pool A:
    - ~~South Korea~~ 1–3 Brazil
    - Bulgaria 3–0 ~~Netherlands~~
      - Standings (after 10 matches): Brazil, Bulgaria 25 points, Netherlands 10, South Korea 0.
  - Pool B: Serbia 2–3 ~~France~~
    - Standings (after 10 matches): Italy, Serbia 24 points, France 8, ~~China~~ 4.
  - Pool D: ~~Poland~~ 1–3 Cuba
    - Standings (after 10 matches): Cuba 24 points, Germany 19, Poland 15, **Argentina** 2.
- Men's European League, Week 5: (teams in **bold** advance to the Final Four, teams in ~~strike~~ are eliminated)
  - Pool A:
    - ~~Slovakia~~ 3–0 **Romania**
    - ~~Great Britain~~ 0–3 **Spain**
      - Standings (after 10 matches): Spain, Romania 17 points, Great Britain, Slovakia 13.
  - Pool B: ~~Greece~~ 3–1 **Portugal**
    - Standings (after 10 matches): Portugal 19 points, **Turkey** 16, Greece 13, ~~Austria~~ 12.
- Women's European League, Week 5: (teams in **bold** advance to the Final Four, teams in ~~strike~~ are eliminated)
  - Pool A: ~~Great Britain~~ 0–3 Serbia
    - Standings: Bulgaria, Serbia 15 points (8 matches), ~~Romania~~ 14 (10), Great Britain 10 (10).
  - Pool B: ~~Greece~~ 0–3 Spain
    - Standings (after 8 matches): Spain 14 points, **Turkey** 13, Israel 12, Greece 9.
- Asian Women's Club Championship in Gresik, Indonesia:
  - 3rd place: (bronze) **JT Marvelous** (Japan) 3–2 (China) Tianjin Bridgestone
  - Final: (silver) Zhetysu Almaty (Kazakhstan) 1–3 (gold) (Thailand) **Federbrau**
    - Federbrau win the title for the second successive time.

=== July 3, 2010 (Saturday) ===
==== Athletics ====
- IAAF Diamond League:
  - Prefontaine Classic in Eugene, United States:
    - Men:
      - 200m: Walter Dix (USA) 19.72
      - 1000m: Abubaker Kaki Khamis (SUD) 2:13.62
      - 1 mile: Asbel Kiprop (KEN) 3:49.75
      - 5000m: Tariku Bekele (ETH) 12:58.93
      - 110m hurdles: David Oliver (USA) 12.90
      - Discus throw: Piotr Małachowski (POL) 67.66 m
      - Long jump: Irving Saladino (PAN) 8.46 m
      - Shot put: Christian Cantwell (USA) 22.41 m
    - Women:
      - 100m: Veronica Campbell Brown (JAM) 10.78
      - 400m: Allyson Felix (USA) 50.27
      - 800m: Mariya Savinova (RUS) 1:57.56
      - 400m hurdles: Lashinda Demus (USA) 53.03
      - 3000m steeplechase: Milcah Chemos Cheywa (KEN) 9:26.70
      - 5000m: Tirunesh Dibaba (ETH) 14:34.07
      - Hammer throw: Tatyana Lysenko (RUS) 75.98 m
      - Javelin: Kara Patterson (USA) 65.90 m
      - Pole vault: Fabiana Murer (BRA) 4.58 m
      - Triple jump: Nadezhda Alekhina (RUS) 14.62 m

==== Auto racing ====
- NASCAR Sprint Cup Series:
  - Coke Zero 400 in Daytona Beach, Florida: (1) (California) Kevin Harvick (Chevrolet, Richard Childress Racing) (2) (Washington (state)) Kasey Kahne (Ford, Richard Petty Motorsports) (3) (California) Jeff Gordon (Chevrolet, Hendrick Motorsports)
    - Drivers' championship standings (after 18 of 36 races): (1) Harvick 2684 points (2) Gordon 2472 (3) (California) Jimmie Johnson (Chevrolet, Hendrick Motorsports) 2459

==== Basketball ====
- FIBA Under-17 World Championship in Hamburg, Germany:
  - Group A:
    - Egypt 69–98 Argentina
    - United States 102–66 Lithuania
    - China 74–71 Serbia
      - Standings (after 2 games): USA 4 points, Serbia, Argentina, China, Lithuania 3, Egypt 2.
  - Group B:
    - Canada 76–68 Australia
    - Poland 101–83 South Korea
    - Spain 64–74 Germany
      - Standings (after 2 games): Poland, Germany 4 points, Canada, Spain 3, Australia, Korea 2.

==== Cricket ====
- Australia in England:
  - 5th ODI in London:
    - Australia 277/7 (50 overs); England 235 (46.3 overs). **Australia win by 42 runs; England win 5-match series 3–2.**
- World Cricket League Division One in the Netherlands:
  - Ireland 237/9 (50 overs); Afghanistan in Rotterdam. Rain stopped play; reserve day to be used.
  - Scotland 236/4 (50 overs); Canada 126/9 (26/26 overs) in Amstelveen. **Scotland win by 69 runs (D/L).**
  - Netherlands 229 (49.2 overs); Kenya 112 (30 overs) in Voorburg. **Netherlands win by 117 runs.**
    - Standings: Scotland 4 points (2 matches), Netherlands 2 (2), Ireland, Afghanistan 2 (1), Canada, Kenya 0 (2).

==== Cycling ====
- Grand Tours:
  - Tour de France:
    - Prologue: (1) Fabian Cancellara (SUI) (Team Saxo Bank) 10' 00" (2) Tony Martin (GER) (Team HTC–Columbia) + 10" (3) David Millar (GBR) (Garmin–Transitions) + 20"

==== Equestrianism ====
- Show jumping:
  - Global Champions Tour:
    - 6th Competition in Cascais: (gold) Meredith Michaels-Beerbaum (GER) on Checkmate (silver) Marco Kutscher (GER) on Cash (bronze) Jos Lansink (BEL) on Valentina van't Heike
      - Standings (after 6 of 9 competitions): (1) Kutscher 182 points (2) Lansink 161 (3) Marcus Ehning (GER) 152

==== Football (soccer) ====
- FIFA World Cup in South Africa:
  - Quarter-finals:
    - In Cape Town: **Germany** 4–0 Argentina BBC Sport
      - In the most lopsided quarter-finals match since 1966, Germany defeat Argentina at the same stage for the second straight time, and reach the top four for the third successive time and 12th overall.
      - Germany become the first team ever to score four goals in two matches against former World Cup champions in the same tournament, and the first team since Brazil in 1970 to score four goals in three matches.
      - Miroslav Klose scores twice and joins countryman Gerd Müller in second place on the overall top scorers list with 14 goals. He also becomes the first player ever to score four goals in three World Cup tournaments.
      - Argentina suffer their biggest defeat in a World Cup Finals match since they lost to the Netherlands in 1974 by the same score.
      - Brazil and Argentina both fail to reach the top four in a World Cup outside Europe for the first time ever.
    - In Johannesburg: Paraguay 0–1 **Spain** BBC Sport
      - After both teams' goalkeepers save penalty kicks within two minutes, David Villa scores his fifth goal of the tournament and puts Spain into the top four for the second time, having done so only in 1950.
      - Spain become the first reigning European champion to reach the semi-finals since France in 1986, and will meet Germany in a re-match of UEFA Euro 2008 Final.
      - Three European teams reach the top four in a World Cup played outside Europe for the third time in history. The previous occasions were in 1986 and 1994.

==== Ice hockey ====
- IIHF InLine Hockey World Championship in Karlstad, Sweden:
  - Semi-finals:
    - **United States** 12–3 Canada
    - Sweden 3–4 **Czech Republic**

==== Mixed martial arts ====
- UFC 116 in Las Vegas:
  - Heavyweight Championship bout: Champion Brock Lesnar (USA) def. Interim Champion Shane Carwin (USA) by submission (arm triangle choke)
  - Middleweight bout: Chris Leben (USA) def. Yoshihiro Akiyama (JPN) by submission (triangle choke)
  - Welterweight bout: Chris Lytle (USA) def. Matt Brown (USA) by submission (armbar)
  - Light Heavyweight bout: Stephan Bonnar (USA) def. Krzysztof Soszynski (CAN) by TKO (strikes)
  - Lightweight bout: George Sotiropoulos (AUS) def. Kurt Pellegrino (USA) by unanimous decision (30–27, 30–27, 29–28)

==== Rugby league ====
- European Shield in Belgrade:
  - Serbia 40–14 Germany

==== Tennis ====
- Grand Slams:
  - Wimbledon Championships in Wimbledon, London, United Kingdom:
    - Women's singles, final:
      - **Serena Williams** (USA) [1] def. Vera Zvonareva (RUS) [21] 6–3, 6–2
        - Williams wins her fourth Wimbledon singles title, and her 13th Grand Slam singles title. BBC Sport
    - Men's doubles, final:
      - **Jürgen Melzer** (AUT) / **Philipp Petzschner** (GER) def. Robert Lindstedt (SWE) / Horia Tecău (ROM) [16] 6–1, 7–5, 7–5
        - Melzer and Petzschner both win their first Grand Slam doubles title.
    - Women's doubles, final:
      - **Vania King** (USA) / **Yaroslava Shvedova** (KAZ) def. Elena Vesnina (RUS) / Vera Zvonareva (RUS) 7–6(6), 6–2
        - King and Shvedova both win their first Grand Slam doubles title.
    - Girls' singles, final:
      - **Kristýna Plíšková** (CZE) [9] def. Sachie Ishizu (JPN) [10] 6–3, 4–6, 6–4
        - Plíšková wins her first Grand Slam title.

==== Volleyball ====
- FIVB World League, Week 5: (teams in **bold** advance to final round, teams in ~~strike~~ are eliminated)
  - Pool A:
    - ~~South Korea~~ 1–3 Brazil
    - Bulgaria 3–0 ~~Netherlands~~
      - Standings (after 9 matches): Brazil, Bulgaria 22 points, Netherlands 10, South Korea 0.
  - Pool B: ~~China~~ 0–3 Italy
    - Standings: Italy 24 points (10 matches), Serbia 23 (9), ~~France~~ 6 (9), China 4 (10).
  - Pool C:
    - ~~Finland~~ 3–1 Russia
    - ~~Egypt~~ 2–3 United States
      - Standings (after 10 matches): Russia 26 points, United States 20, Finland 9, Egypt 5.
  - Pool D: Poland 0–3 Cuba
    - Standings: Cuba 21 points (9 matches), Germany 19 (10), Poland 15 (9), **Argentina** 2 (10)
- Men's European League, Week 5: (teams in **bold** advance to the Final Four, teams in ~~strike~~ are eliminated)
  - Pool A:
    - ~~Slovakia~~ 1–3 **Romania**
    - Great Britain 0–3 **Spain**
      - Standings (after 9 matches): Romania 16 points, Spain 15, Great Britain 12, Slovakia 11.
  - Pool B:
    - ~~Greece~~ 1–3 **Portugal**
    - ~~Austria~~ 3–1 Turkey
      - Standings: Portugal 18 points (9 matches), Turkey 16 (10), Austria 12 (10), Greece 11 (9).
- Women's European League, Week 5: (teams in **bold** advance to the Final Four, teams in ~~strike~~ are eliminated)
  - Pool A: ~~Great Britain~~ 0–3 Serbia
    - Standings: Bulgaria 15 points (8 matches), Romania 14 (10), Serbia 13 (7), Great Britain 9 (9).
  - Pool B:
    - ~~Greece~~ 0–3 Spain
    - Israel 3–0 **Turkey** (technical win)
      - The matches between Israel and Turkey were cancelled due to political tension between the countries. The results were set as 3–0 for the home teams.
      - Standings: Turkey 13 points (8 matches), Spain 12 (7), Israel 12 (8), Greece 8 (7).
- Asian Women's Club Championship in Gresik, Indonesia:
  - Semifinals:
    - JT Marvelous (Japan) 1–3 **(Kazakhstan) Zhetysu Almaty**
    - **Federbrau (Thailand)** 3–0 (China) Tianjin Bridgestone

=== July 2, 2010 (Friday) ===
==== Auto racing ====
- Nationwide Series:
  - Subway Jalapeño 250 in Daytona Beach, Florida: (1) (North Carolina) Dale Earnhardt Jr. (Chevrolet; Richard Childress Racing) (2) (Connecticut) Joey Logano (Toyota; Joe Gibbs Racing) (3) (Mississippi) Ricky Stenhouse Jr. (Ford; Roush Fenway Racing)
    - Drivers' championship standings (after 17 of 35 races): (1) (Michigan) Brad Keselowski (Dodge; Penske Racing) 2806 points (2) (Missouri) Carl Edwards (Ford; Roush Fenway Racing) 2529 (3) (Illinois) Justin Allgaier (Dodge; Penske Racing) 2318

==== Basketball ====
- FIBA Under-17 World Championship in Hamburg, Germany:
  - Group A:
    - Lithuania 85–72 China
    - Serbia 99–67 Egypt
    - Argentina 70–82 United States
  - Group B:
    - Australia 54–71 Poland
    - Germany 69–68 Canada
    - South Korea 71–86 Spain

==== Football (soccer) ====
- FIFA World Cup in South Africa:
  - Quarter-finals:
    - In Port Elizabeth: **Netherlands** 2–1 Brazil
      - The Netherlands rally from a goal down with two goals by Wesley Sneijder to reach the top four for the fourth time, while Brazil is eliminated in the quarter-finals for the second successive time.
    - In Johannesburg: **Uruguay** 1–1 (4–2 pen.) Ghana
      - After Ghana's Asamoah Gyan misses a penalty kick in the last minute of extra time, Uruguayan goalkeeper Fernando Muslera saves two kicks from John Mensah and Dominic Adiyiah in the penalty shootout, to put his team into the semi-finals for the first time since 1970.

==== Ice hockey ====
- IIHF InLine Hockey World Championship in Karlstad, Sweden:
  - Quarter-finals:
    - Finland 8–10 **Canada**
    - **Czech Republic** 7–2 Slovenia
    - **United States** 9–0 Slovakia
    - **Sweden** 6–4 Germany

==== Tennis ====
- Grand Slams:
  - Wimbledon Championships in Wimbledon, London, United Kingdom:
    - Men's singles, semi-finals:
      - **Rafael Nadal** (ESP) [2] def. Andy Murray (GBR) [4] 6–4, 7–6(6), 6–4
        - Nadal advances to his second straight Grand Slam final, his fourth at Wimbledon, and tenth in total.
      - **Tomáš Berdych** (CZE) [12] def. Novak Djokovic (SRB) [3] 6–3, 7–6(9), 6–3
        - Berdych advances to his first Grand Slam final.

==== Volleyball ====
- FIVB World League, Week 5: (teams in ~~strike~~ are eliminated)
  - Pool B:
    - ~~China~~ 0–3 Italy
    - Serbia 3–1 ~~France~~
      - Standings (after 9 matches): Serbia 23 points, Italy 21, France 6, China 4.
  - Pool C:
    - ~~Finland~~ 0–3 Russia
    - ~~Egypt~~ 2–3 United States
      - Standings (after 9 matches): Russia 26 points, United States 18, Finland 6, Egypt 4.
- Men's European League, Week 5: (teams in **bold** advance to the Final Four, teams in ~~strike~~ are eliminated)
  - Pool B: ~~Austria~~ 0–3 Turkey
    - Standings: **Portugal** 16 points (8 matches), Turkey 15 (9), Greece 10 (8), Austria 10 (9).
- Women's European League, Week 5: (teams in **bold** advance to the Final Four, teams in ~~strike~~ are eliminated)
  - Pool A: Bulgaria 3–1 Romania
    - Standings: Bulgaria 15 points (8 matches), Romania 14 (10), Serbia 11 (6), ~~Great Britain~~ 8 (8).
  - Pool B: Israel 3–0 **Turkey** (technical win)
    - The matches between Israel and Turkey were cancelled due to political tension between the countries. The results were set as 3–0 for the home teams.
    - Standings: Turkey 12 points (7 matches), Spain 10 (6), Israel 10 (7), Greece 7 (6).
- Asian Women's Club Championship in Gresik, Indonesia:
  - Quarterfinals:
    - **JT Marvelous (Japan)** 3–0 (Vietnam) VTV Binh Dien Long An
    - **Federbrau (Thailand)** 3–0 (Iran) Zob Ahan Isfahan
    - Sobaeksu (North Korea) 2–3 **(China) Tianjin Bridgestone**
    - **Zhetysu Almaty (Kazakhstan)** 3–1 Chinese Taipei

=== July 1, 2010 (Thursday) ===
==== Baseball ====
- The Arizona Diamondbacks fire General Manager Josh Byrnes and manager A. J. Hinch, with Kirk Gibson replacing Hinch. (CBS News)

==== Cricket ====
- ICC World Cricket League Division One in the Netherlands:
  - Canada 257/7 (50 overs); Afghanistan 258/4 (48.4 overs) in Voorburg. **Afghanistan win by 6 wickets.**
  - Kenya 163 (45.3 overs); Ireland 164/3 (39.5 overs) in Rotterdam. **Ireland win by 7 wickets.**
  - Netherlands 234/6 (50 overs); Scotland 235/9 (49.5 overs) in Amstelveen. **Scotland win by 1 wicket.**

==== Football (soccer) ====
- UEFA Europa League First qualifying round, first leg:
  - UE Santa Coloma (Andorra) 0–3 (Montenegro) Mogren
  - Olimpija (Slovenia) 0–2 (Bosnia and Herzegovina) Široki Brijeg
  - Anorthosis (Cyprus) 3–0 (Armenia) Banants
  - Olimpia (Moldova) 0–0 (Azerbaijan) Khazar
  - Šibenik (Croatia) 0–0 (Malta) Sliema Wanderers
  - Tobol (Kazakhstan) 1–2 (Bosnia and Herzegovina) Zrinjski
  - Ulisses (Armenia) 0–0 (Israel) Bnei Yehuda
  - Rabotnički (North Macedonia) 5–0 (Andorra) Lusitanos
  - KF Tirana (Albania) 0–0 (Hungary) Zalaegerszeg
  - Zestafoni (Georgia (country)) 5–0 (San Marino) Faetano
  - NSÍ Runavík (Faroe Islands) 0–2 (Sweden) Gefle
  - Torpedo Zhodino (Belarus) 3–0 (Iceland) Fylkir
  - Randers (Denmark) 6–1 (Luxembourg) F91 Dudelange
  - Portadown (Northern Ireland) 1–1 (Latvia) Skonto
  - TPS (Finland) 3–1 (Wales) Port Talbot Town
  - KR Reykjavík (Iceland) 3–0 (Northern Ireland) Glentoran
  - Grevenmacher (Luxembourg) 3–3 (Republic of Ireland) Dundalk
  - Kalmar FF (Sweden) 1–0 (Faroe Islands) EB/Streymur
  - Llanelli (Wales) 2–2 (Lithuania) Tauras Tauragė
  - Narva Trans (Estonia) 0–2 (Finland) MYPA
  - Zeta (Montenegro) 1–1 (Moldova) Dacia
  - Laçi (Albania) 1–1 (Belarus) Dnepr Mogilev
  - Shakhter Karaganda (Kazakhstan) 1–2 (Poland) Ruch Chorzów
  - Dinamo Tbilisi (Georgia (country)) 2–1 (Estonia) Flora
  - Nitra (Slovakia) 2–2 (Hungary) Győri ETO
  - Qarabağ (Azerbaijan) 4–1 (North Macedonia) Metalurg Skopje

==== Tennis ====
- Grand Slams:
  - Wimbledon Championships in Wimbledon, London, United Kingdom:
    - Women's singles, semi-finals:
      - **Serena Williams** (USA) [1] def. Petra Kvitová (CZE) 7–6(5), 6–2
        - Williams advances to her sixth Wimbledon singles final, and the 16th Grand Slam singles final of her career.
      - **Vera Zvonareva** (RUS) [21] def. Tsvetana Pironkova (BUL) 6–3, 3–6, 6–2
        - Zvonareva advances to her first Grand Slam singles final.

==== Volleyball ====
- FIVB World League, Week 5: (teams in **bold** advance to final round)
  - Pool D: Germany 3–1 **Argentina**
    - Standings: Germany 19 points (10 matches), Cuba 18 (8), Poland 15 (8), Argentina 2 (10).
- Women's European League, Week 5: (teams in ~~strike~~ are eliminated)
  - Pool A: Bulgaria 3–0 Romania
    - Standings: Bulgaria 13 points (7 matches), Romania 13 (9), Serbia 11 (6), ~~Great Britain~~ 8 (8).
