= Swimming at the 2011 World Aquatics Championships – Women's 50 metre breaststroke =

Women's 50 metre breaststroke at the 2011 World Aquatics Championships
- Dates: July 30, 2011 (heats and semifinals); July 31, 2011 (final)
- Competitors: 38 from 33 nations
- Winning time: 30.19

Medalists
gold medal	Jessica Hardy	United States
silver medal	Yuliya Yefimova	Russia
bronze medal	Rebecca Soni	United States

The women's 50 metre breaststroke competition of the swimming events at the 2011 World Aquatics Championships was held on July 30 with the heats and the semifinals and July 31 with the final.

== Records ==
Prior to the competition, the existing world and championship records were as follows.

	Name	Nation	Time	Location	Date
World record	Jessica Hardy	United States	29.80	Federal Way	August 7, 2009
Championship record	Yuliya Yefimova	Russia	30.09	Rome	August 2, 2009

== Results ==
=== Heats ===
36 swimmers participated in 5 heats.

Rank	Heat	Lane	Name	Nationality	Time	Notes
1	5	4	Jessica Hardy	United States	30.20	Q
2	3	4	Yuliya Yefimova	Russia	30.72	Q
2	4	5	Rebecca Soni	United States	30.72	Q
4	5	3	Jennie Johansson	Sweden	30.89	Q, NR
5	5	5	Leisel Jones	Australia	30.93	Q
6	4	4	Leiston Pickett	Australia	31.07	Q
7	4	3	Rebecca Ejdervik	Sweden	31.19	Q
8	3	3	Kate Haywood	Great Britain	31.30	Q
9	3	6	Liu Xiaoyu	China	31.32	Q
10	4	6	Moniek Nijhuis	Netherlands	31.40	Q
10	5	6	Zhao Jin	China	31.40	Q
12	5	7	Petra Chocova	Czech Republic	31.41	Q
13	5	8	Sycerika McMahon	Ireland	31.49	Q, NR
14	4	7	Rikke Pedersen	Denmark	31.65	Q
15	3	8	Suzaan van Biljon	South Africa	31.96	Q
16	3	1	Jane Trepp	Estonia	32.00	Q
17	5	1	Erla Haraldsdottir	Iceland	32.10	
18	3	7	Stephanie Spahn	Switzerland	32.14	
19	2	5	Danielle Beaubrun	Saint Lucia	32.27	NR
20	4	8	Loh Christina	Malaysia	32.29	
21	3	2	Kim Dal-Eun	South Korea	32.43	
22	4	1	Anastasia Christoforou	Cyprus	32.69	
23	2	6	Ivana Ninkovic	Bosnia and Herzegovina	32.86	
24	2	3	Lei On Kei	Macau	32.90	
25	2	4	Patricia Casellas	Puerto Rico	33.62	
26	2	2	Jamila Lunkuse	Uganda	36.65	
27	2	1	Mariana Henriques	Angola	37.23	
28	2	7	Oksana Hatamkhanova	Azerbaijan	37.94	
29	1	4	Antoinette Guedia Mouafo	Cameroon	40.15	
30	1	5	Angelika Sita Ouedraogo	Burkina Faso	40.93	
31	2	8	Dede Camara	Guinea	44.44	
32	1	6	Vilayphone Vongphachanh	Laos	46.37	
33	1	2	Angele Gbenou	Benin	46.90	
34	1	7	Nafissa Adamou	Niger	51.24	
–	3	5	Dorothea Brandt	Germany		DNS
–	4	2	Jillian Tyler	Canada		DNS
–	5	2	Satomi Suzuki	Japan		DNS
–	1	3	Ingrid Outtara	Burkina Faso		DSQ

=== Semifinals ===
The semifinals were held at 18:16.

==== Semifinal 1 ====
Rank	Lane	Name	Nationality	Time	Notes
1	4	Yuliya Yefimova	Russia	30.81	Q
2	3	Leiston Pickett	Australia	30.96	Q
3	5	Jennie Johansson	Sweden	31.16	Q
4	2	Moniek Nijhuis	Netherlands	31.40	Q
5	6	Kate Haywood	Great Britain	31.43	
6	7	Petra Chocova	Czech Republic	31.75	
7	1	Rikke Pedersen	Denmark	32.07	
8	8	Jane Trepp	Estonia	32.33	

==== Semifinal 2 ====
Rank	Lane	Name	Nationality	Time	Notes
1	4	Jessica Hardy	United States	30.40	Q
2	5	Rebecca Soni	United States	30.74	Q
3	3	Leisel Jones	Australia	31.14	Q
4	6	Rebecca Ejdervik	Sweden	31.41	Q
5	7	Zhao Jin	China	31.46	
6	2	Liu Xiaoyu	China	31.50	
7	1	Sycerika McMahon	Ireland	31.83	
8	8	Suzaan van Biljon	South Africa	31.97	

=== Final ===
The final was held at 18:02.

Rank	Lane	Name	Nationality	Time	Notes
1st place, gold medalist(s)	4	Jessica Hardy	United States	30.19	
2nd place, silver medalist(s)	3	Yuliya Yefimova	Russia	30.49	
3rd place, bronze medalist(s)	5	Rebecca Soni	United States	30.58	
4	6	Leiston Pickett	Australia	30.74	
5	7	Jennie Johansson	Sweden	30.89	=NR
6	2	Leisel Jones	Australia	31.01	
7	1	Moniek Nijhuis	Netherlands	31.33	
8	8	Rebecca Ejdervik	Sweden	31.45	
