= China at the 2011 World Aquatics Championships =

- Flag of China
- World Aquatics code: CHN
- National federation: Chinese Swimming Association
- Website: swimmingsport.org.cn

in Shanghai, China
- Competitors: 110 in 5 sports
- Medals Ranked 2nd: Gold 15 Silver 13 Bronze 8 Total 36

World Aquatics Championships appearances
- 1973; 1975; 1978; 1982; 1986; 1991; 1994; 1998; 2001; 2003; 2005; 2007; 2009; 2011; 2013; 2015; 2017; 2019; 2022; 2023; 2024; 2025

China competed at the 2011 World Aquatics Championships in Shanghai, China between July 16 and 31, 2011.

== Medalists ==
| Medal | Name | Sport | Event | Date |
|---|---|---|---|---|
| Gold | Minxia Wu; He Zi | Diving | Women's 3m Synchro Springboard | 16 July |
| Gold | Qiu Bo; Huo Liang | Diving | Men's 10m Synchro Platform | 17 July |
| Gold | Li Shixin | Diving | Men's 1m Springboard | 18 July |
| Gold | Wang Hao; Chen Ruolin | Diving | Women's 10m Synchro Platform | 18 July |
| Gold | Qin Kai; Luo Yutong | Diving | Men's 3 m Synchro Springboard | 19 July |
| Gold | Shi Tingmao | Diving | Women's 1m Springboard | 19 July |
| Gold | Chen Ruolin | Diving | Women's 10 m Platform | 21 July |
| Gold | He Chong | Diving | Men's 3m Springboard | 22 July |
| Gold | Wu Minxia | Diving | Women's 3m Springboard | 23 July |
| Gold | Qiu Bo | Diving | Men's 10 m Platform | 24 July |
| Gold | Ye Shiwen | Swimming | Women's 200m IM | 25 July |
| Gold | Zhao Jing | Swimming | Women's 100m Backstroke | 26 July |
| Gold | Sun Yang | Swimming | Men's 800m Freestyle | 27 July |
| Gold | Jiao Liuyang | Swimming | Women's 200m Butterfly | 28 July |
| Gold | Sun Yang | Swimming | Men's 1500m Freestyle | 31 July |
| Silver | Huang Xuechen | Synchronised Swimming | Solo Technical Routine | 17 July |
| Silver | He Min | Diving | Men's 1m Springboard | 18 July |
| Silver | Huang Xuechen; Liu Ou; Luo Xi (reserve) | Synchronised Swimming | Duet Technical Routine | 18 July |
| Silver | Wang Han | Diving | Women's 1m Springboard | 19 July |
| Silver | Chang Si; Huang Xuechen; Jiang Tingting; Jiang Wenwen; Liu Ou; Luo Xi; Sun Wenyan; Wu Yiwen; Chen Xiaojun (reserve); Guo Li (reserve) | Synchronised Swimming | Team Technical Routine | 19 July |
| Silver | Hu Yadan | Diving | Women's 10 m Platform | 21 July |
| Silver | Chang Si; Chen Xiaojun; Fan Jiachen; Guo Li; Huang Xuechen; Jiang Tingting; Liu Ou; Luo Xi; Wu Yiwen; Yu Lele; Jiang Tingting (reserve); Jiang Wenwen (reserve) | Synchronised Swimming | Free Routine Combination | 21 July |
| Silver | Jiang Tingting; Jiang Wenwen | Synchronised Swimming | Duet Free Routine | 22 July |
| Silver | He Zi | Diving | Women's 3m Springboard | 23 July |
| Silver | Chang Si; Fan Jiachen; Huang Xuechen; Jiang Tingting; Jiang Wenwen; Liu Ou; Luo Xi; Wu Yiwen; Chen Xiaojun (reserve); Sun Wenyan (reserve) | Synchronised Swimming | Team Free Routine | 23 July |
| Silver | Sun Yang | Swimming | Men's 400m Freestyle | 24 July |
| Silver | Jun Yang; Fei Teng; Liu Ping; Sun Yujun; He Jin; Sun Yating; Song Donglun; Yuan Chen; Wang Yi; Ma Huanhuan; Sun Huizi; Zhang Lei; Wang Ying | Water Polo | Women's Tournament | 29 July |
| Silver | Zhao Jing; Ji Liping; Lu Ying; Tang Yi; Gao Chang; Sun Ye; Jiao Liuyang; Li Zhesi | Swimming | Women's 4 × 100 m Medley Relay | 30 July |
| Bronze | Sun Wenyan | Synchronised Swimming | Solo Free Routine | 20 July |
| Bronze | Lu Ying | Swimming | Women's 100m Butterfly | 25 July |
| Bronze | Li Xuanxu | Swimming | Women's 1500m Freestyle | 26 July |
| Bronze | Ji Liping | Swimming | Women's 100m Breaststroke | 26 July |
| Bronze | Wu Peng | Swimming | Men's 200m Butterfly | 27 July |
| Bronze | Liu Zige | Swimming | Women's 200m Butterfly | 28 July |
| Bronze | Chen Qian; Pang Jiaying; Liu Jing; Tang Yi; Zhu Qianwei | Swimming | Women's 4 × 200 m Freestyle Relay | 28 July |
| Bronze | Wang Shun; Zhang Lin; Li Yunqi; Sun Yang; Jiang Yuhui | Swimming | Men's 4 × 200 m Freestyle Relay | 29 July |

Medals by date
| Day | Date | Gold medal | Silver medal | Bronze medal | Total |
| Day 1 | 16th | 1 | 0 | 0 | 1 |
| Day 2 | 17th | 1 | 1 | 0 | 2 |
| Day 3 | 18th | 2 | 2 | 0 | 4 |
| Day 4 | 19th | 2 | 2 | 0 | 4 |
| Day 5 | 20th | 0 | 0 | 1 | 1 |
| Day 6 | 21st | 1 | 2 | 0 | 3 |
| Day 7 | 22nd | 1 | 1 | 0 | 2 |
| Day 8 | 23rd | 1 | 2 | 0 | 3 |
| Day 9 | 24th | 1 | 1 | 0 | 2 |
| Day 10 | 25th | 1 | 0 | 1 | 2 |
| Day 11 | 26th | 1 | 0 | 2 | 3 |
| Day 12 | 27th | 1 | 0 | 1 | 2 |
| Day 13 | 28th | 1 | 0 | 2 | 3 |
| Day 14 | 29th | 0 | 1 | 1 | 2 |
| Day 15 | 30th | 0 | 1 | 0 | 1 |
| Day 16 | 31st | 1 | 0 | 0 | 1 |
| Total | | 15 | 13 | 8 | 36 |

== Diving ==
China has 15 qualified athletes in diving.

Men

| Athlete | Event | Preliminary | | Semifinals | | Final | |
| Athlete | Event | Points | Rank | Points | Rank | Points | Rank |
|---|---|---|---|---|---|---|---|
| He Min | Men's 1m Springboard | 432.95 | 2 Q | | | 444.00 | Silver medal |
| Li Shixin | Men's 1m Springboard | 438.00 | 1 Q | | | 463.90 | Gold medal |
| He Chong | Men's 3m Springboard | 500.40 | 2 Q | 523.50 | 1 Q | 554.30 | Gold medal |
| Qin Kai | Men's 3m Springboard | 504.75 | 1 Q | 523.25 | 2 Q | 481.90 | 4 |
| Qiu Bo | Men's 10m Platform | 562.20 | 1 Q | 579.55 | 1 Q | 585.45 | 1st place, gold medalist(s) |
| Zhou Lüxin | Men's 10m Platform | 528.85 | 2 Q | 473.75 | 5 Q | 441.00 | 10 |
| Luo Yutong; Qin Kai | Men's 3m Synchro Springboard | 452.19 | 1 Q | | | 463.98 | Gold medal |
| Huo Liang; Qiu Bo | Men's 10m Synchro Platform | 477.96 | 1 Q | | | 480.03 | Gold medal |

Women

| Athlete | Event | Preliminary | | Semifinals | | Final | |
| Athlete | Event | Points | Rank | Points | Rank | Points | Rank |
|---|---|---|---|---|---|---|---|
| Shi Tingmao | Women's 1m Springboard | 294.65 | 2 Q | | | 318.65 | Gold medal |
| Wang Han | Women's 1m Springboard | 306.60 | 1 Q | | | 310.20 | Silver medal |
| He Zi | Women's 3m Springboard | 347.55 | 1 Q | 358.05 | 3 Q | 379.15 | 2nd place, silver medalist(s) |
| Wu Minxia | Women's 3m Springboard | 345.85 | 2 Q | 360.65 | 1 Q | 380.85 | 1st place, gold medalist(s) |
| Chen Ruolin | Women's 10m Platform | 370.30 | 2 Q | 385.95 | 2 Q | 405.30 | Gold medal |
| Hu Yadan | Women's 10m Platform | 382.25 | 1 Q | 403.65 | 1 Q | 394.00 | Silver medal |
| He Zi; Wu Minxia | Women's 3m Synchro Springboard | 324.90 | 1 Q | | | 356.40 | Gold medal |
| Chen Ruolin; Wang Hao | Women's 10m Synchro Platform | 335.34 | 1 Q | | | 362.58 | Gold medal |

== Open water swimming ==
Men

| Athlete | Event | Final | |
| Athlete | Event | Time | Position |
|---|---|---|---|
| Xu Wenchao | Men's 5km | 56:32.2 | 15 |
| Yao Han | Men's 5km | 1:02:03.6 | 37 |
| Jiang Tiansheng | Men's 10km | 2:00:45.0 | 41 |
| Zhang Zibin | Men's 10km | 1:55:20.2 | 24 |
| Han Lidu | Men's 25km | 5:32:02.1 | 17 |
| Weng Jingwei | Men's 25km | 5:47:16.0 | 19 |

Women

| Athlete | Event | Final | |
| Athlete | Event | Time | Position |
|---|---|---|---|
| Shi Yu | Women's 5km | 1:01:00.3 | 17 |
| Wang Hefei | Women's 5km | 1:01:06.8 | 20 |
| Fang Yanqiao | Women's 10km | 2:02:24.6 | 12 |
| Li Xue | Women's 10km | 2:04:39.90 | 27 |
| Sun Minjie | Women's 25km | 5:55:16.3 | 16 |
| Cao Shiyue | Women's 25km | 5:54:21.9 | 15 |

Mixed

| Athlete | Event | Final | |
| Athlete | Event | Time | Position |
|---|---|---|---|
| Fang Yanqiao; Xu Wenchao; Zhang Zibin | Team | 1:01:02.2 | 8 |

== Swimming ==
China qualified 45 swimmers.

Men

22 swimmers

| Event | Athletes | Heat | | Semifinal | | Final | |
| Event | Athletes | Time | Rank | Time | Rank | Time | Rank |
|---|---|---|---|---|---|---|---|
| 50 m freestyle | Lü Zhiwu | 22.55 | 24 | did not advance | | | |
| 100 m freestyle | Lü Zhiwu | 49.26 | 26 | did not advance | | | |
| 100 m freestyle | Jiang Haiqi | 50.16 | 38 | did not advance | | | |
| 200 m freestyle | Li Yunqi | 1:48.94 | 24 | did not advance | | | |
| 200 m freestyle | Jiang Haiqi | 1:49.43 | 29 | did not advance | | | |
| 400 m freestyle | Sun Yang | 3:44.87 | 1 Q | | | 3:43.24 | Silver medal |
| 400 m freestyle | Dai Jun | 3:47.58 | 11 | | | did not advance | |
| 800 m freestyle | Sun Yang | 7:45.29 | 1 Q | | | 7:38.57 | Gold medal |
| 800 m freestyle | Dai Jun | 7:54.63 | 12 | | | did not advance | |
| 1500 m freestyle | Sun Yang | 14:48.13 | 1 Q | | | 14:34.14 | Gold medal |
| 1500 m freestyle | Dai Jun | 15:09.15 | 12 | | | did not advance | |
| 50 m backstroke | Cheng Feiyi | 25.52 | 18 | did not advance | | | |
| 50 m backstroke | Sun Xiaolei | 25.44 | 17 | did not advance | | | |
| 100 m backstroke | Cheng Feiyi | 54.60 | 20 | did not advance | | | |
| 100 m backstroke | Sun Xiaolei | 54.43 | 16 Q | 54.21 | 15 | did not advance | |
| 200 m backstroke | Cheng Feiyi | 1:59.08 | 20 | did not advance | | | |
| 200 m backstroke | Zhang Fenglin | 1:57.37 | 5 Q | 1:56.70 | 4 Q | 1:56.39 | 4 |
| 50 m breaststroke | Gu Biaorong | 28.14 | 19 | did not advance | | | |
| 100 m breaststroke | Xie Zhi | 1:01.30 | 23 | did not advance | | | |
| 100 m breaststroke | Chen Cheng | 1:01.81 | 36 | did not advance | | | |
| 200 m breaststroke | Xue Ruipeng | 2:13.54 | 22 | did not advance | | | |
| 200 m breaststroke | Huang Chaosheng | 2:13.02 | 17 | did not advance | | | |
| 50 m butterfly | Zhou Jiawei | 24.33 | 27 | did not advance | | | |
| 100 m butterfly | Zhou Jiawei | 53.23 | 28 | did not advance | | | |
| 100 m butterfly | Wu Peng | 53.59 | 35 | did not advance | | | |
| 200 m butterfly | Chen Yin | 1:56.23 | 6 Q | 1:54.80 | 2 Q | 1:55.00 | 4 |
| 200 m butterfly | Wu Peng | 1:56.98 | 15 Q | 1:55.28 | 5 Q | 1:54.67 | Bronze medal |
| 200 m individual medley | Wang Shun | 2:00.12 | 18 | did not advance | | | |
| 200 m individual medley | Zhang Fenglin | 2:04.49 | 33 | did not advance | | | |
| 400 m individual medley | Huang Chaosheng | 4:14.07 | 3 Q | | | 4:13.62 | 4 |
| 400 m individual medley | Wang Chengxiang | 4:16.45 | 7 Q | | | 4:15.89 | 7 |
| 4 × 100 m freestyle relay | Lü Zhiwu; Jiang Haiqi; He Jianbin; Zhang Enjian | 3:17.56 | 13 | | | did not advance | |
| 4 × 200 m freestyle relay | Wang Shun; Zhang Lin; Li Yunqi; Sun Yang; Jiang Yuhui* | 7:12.19 | 6 Q | | | 7:05.67 | Bronze medal |
| 4 × 100 m medley relay | Sun Xiaolei; Xie Zhi; Zhou Jiawei; Lü Zhiwu | 3:36.92 | 13 | | | did not advance | |

- * raced in heats only

Women

23 swimmers

| Event | Athletes | Heat | | Semifinal | | Final | |
| Event | Athletes | Time | Rank | Time | Rank | Time | Rank |
|---|---|---|---|---|---|---|---|
| 50 m freestyle | Li Zhesi | DNS | | did not advance | | | |
| 50 m freestyle | Zhu Qianwei | 25.57 | 21 | did not advance | | | |
| 100 m freestyle | Tang Yi | 54.37 | 6 Q | Withdrew | | did not advance | |
| 100 m freestyle | Wang Shijia | 54.99 | 19 | did not advance | | | |
| 200 m freestyle | Tang Yi | 1:58.30 | 15 Q | 1:57.91 | 11 | did not advance | |
| 200 m freestyle | Zhu Qianwei | 1:59.22 | 21 | did not advance | | | |
| 400 m freestyle | Song Wenyan | 4:16.26 | 23 | | | did not advance | |
| 400 m freestyle | Shao Yiwen | 4:08.42 | 10 | | | did not advance | |
| 800 m freestyle | Chen Qian | 8:42.15 | 19 | | | did not advance | |
| 800 m freestyle | Shao Yiwen | 8:29.05 | 10 | | | did not advance | |
| 1500 m freestyle | Li Xuanxu | 16:05.82 | 6 Q | | | 15:58.02 | Bronze medal |
| 1500 m freestyle | Shao Yiwen | 16:01.72 | 2 Q | | | 16:12.01 | 8 |
| 50 m backstroke | Gao Chang | 28.27 | 3 Q | 28.05 | 4 Q | 28.06 | 4 |
| 50 m backstroke | Zhou Yanxin | 28.24 | 2 Q | 28.44 | 11 | did not advance | |
| 100 m backstroke | Gao Chang | 1:01.84 | 22 | did not advance | | | |
| 100 m backstroke | Zhao Jing | 1:00.66 | 10 Q | 59.44 | 3 Q | 59.05 | Gold medal |
| 200 m backstroke | Zhu Jiani | 2:11.84 | 18 | did not advance | | | |
| 200 m backstroke | Zhao Jing | 2:10.40 | 12 Q | 2:08.86 | 10 | did not advance | |
| 50 m breaststroke | Zhao Jin | 31.40 | 10 Q | 31.46 | 10 | did not advance | |
| 50 m breaststroke | Liu Xiaoyu | 31.32 | 9 Q | 31.50 | 11 | did not advance | |
| 100 m breaststroke | Ji Liping | 1:07.10 | 2 Q | 1:07.09 | 3 Q | 1:06.52 | Bronze medal |
| 100 m breaststroke | Sun Ye | 1:07.96 | 10 Q | 1:07.25 | 5 Q | 1:07.08 | 5 |
| 200 m breaststroke | Ji Liping | 2:27.91 | 17 | did not advance | | | |
| 200 m breaststroke | Sun Ye | 2:27.17 | 9 Q | 2:24.59 | 3 Q | 2:25.09 | 4 |
| 50 m butterfly | Jiao Liuyang | 27.03 | 22 | did not advance | | | |
| 50 m butterfly | Lu Ying | 26.16 | 4 Q | 25.87 | 3 Q | 25.87 | 4 |
| 100 m butterfly | Liu Zige | 58.44 | 9 Q | 57.85 | 6 Q | 57.57 | 6 |
| 100 m butterfly | Lu Ying | 57.93 | 5 Q | 57.18 | 2 Q | 57.06 | Bronze medal |
| 200 m butterfly | Liu Zige | 2:08.28 | 5 Q | 2:06.69 | 3 Q | 2:05.90 | Bronze medal |
| 200 m butterfly | Jiao Liuyang | 2:08.47 | 8 Q | 2:06.99 | 7 Q | 2:05.55 | Gold medal |
| 200 m individual medley | Ye Shiwen | 2:11.63 | 4 Q | 2:10.08 | 3 Q | 2:08.90 | Gold medal |
| 200 m individual medley | Zhu Xiaoya | 2:14.98 | 17 | did not advance | | | |
| 400 m individual medley | Ye Shiwen | 4:38.18 | 8 Q | | | 4:35.15 | 5 |
| 400 m individual medley | Li Xuanxu | 4:37.61 | 7 Q | | | 4:35.78 | 6 |
| 4 × 100 m freestyle relay | Li Zhesi; Wang Shijia; Pang Jiaying; Tang Yi | 3:37.14 | 3 Q | | | 3:36.40 | 4 |
| 4 × 200 m freestyle relay | Chen Qian; Pang Jiaying; Liu Jing; Tang Yi; Zhu Qianwei* | 7:53.21 | 4 Q | | | 7:47.66 | Bronze medal |
| 4 × 100 m medley relay | Zhao Jing; Ji Liping; Lu Ying; Tang Yi; Gao Chang*; Sun Ye*; Jiao Liuyang*; Li Zhesi* | 3:59.44 | 3 Q | | | 3:55.61 | Silver medal |

- * raced in heats only

== Synchronised swimming ==
China has qualified 12 athletes in synchronised swimming.

Women

| Athlete | Event | Preliminary | | Final | |
| Athlete | Event | Points | Rank | Points | Rank |
|---|---|---|---|---|---|
| Huang Xuechen | Solo Technical Routine | 95.500 | 2 Q | 96.500 | Silver medal |
| Sun Wenyan | Solo Free Routine | 95.970 | 3 Q | 95.840 | Bronze medal |
| Huang Xuechen; Liu Ou; Luo Xi (reserve) | Duet Technical Routine | 95.800 | 2 Q | 96.500 | Silver medal |
| Jiang Tingting; Jiang Wenwen | Duet Free Routine | 96.770 | 2 Q | 96.810 | Silver medal |
| Chang Si; Huang Xuechen; Jiang Tingting; Jiang Wenwen; Liu Ou; Luo Xi; Sun Wenyan; Wu Yiwen; Chen Xiaojun (reserve); Guo Li (reserve) | Team Technical Routine | 96.000 | 2 Q | 96.800 | Silver medal |
| Chang Si; Fan Jiachen; Huang Xuechen; Jiang Tingting; Jiang Wenwen; Liu Ou; Luo Xi; Wu Yiwen; Chen Xiaojun (reserve); Sun Wenyan (reserve) | Team Free Routine | 96.440 | 2 Q | 96.580 | Silver medal |
| Chang Si; Chen Xiaojun; Fan Jiachen; Guo Li; Huang Xuechen; Liu Ou; Luo Xi; Sun Wenyan; Wu Yiwen; Yu Lele; Jiang Tingting (reserve); Jiang Wenwen (reserve) | Free Routine Combination | 96.320 | 2 Q | 96.390 | Silver medal |

== Water polo ==
=== Men ===
Team Roster

- Ge Weiqing
- Tan Feihu
- Liang Zhongxing
- Yu Lijun
- Guo Junliang
- Pan Ning
- Li Bin – Captain
- Wang Yang
- Xie Junmin
- Li Li
- Zhang Chufeng
- Dong Tianyi
- Wu Honghui

==== Group B ====
| Team | Pld | W | D | L | GF | GA | GD | Pts |
|---|---|---|---|---|---|---|---|---|
| Serbia | 3 | 3 | 0 | 0 | 41 | 19 | +22 | 6 |
| Australia | 3 | 2 | 0 | 1 | 30 | 27 | +3 | 4 |
| Romania | 3 | 1 | 0 | 2 | 27 | 31 | –4 | 2 |
| China | 3 | 0 | 0 | 3 | 22 | 43 | –21 | 0 |

| July 18, 2011; 21:00 | Report | Serbia | 17–5 | China | Shanghai Oriental Sports Center, Shanghai; Attendance: 400; Referees: Flahive (AUS), Reemnet (NED) |
| July 18, 2011; 21:00 | Report | Score by quarters: 5–1, 3–0, 2–2, 7–2 | | | Shanghai Oriental Sports Center, Shanghai; Attendance: 400; Referees: Flahive (AUS), Reemnet (NED) |
| July 18, 2011; 21:00 | Report | Filipović 4 | Goals | Five players 1 | Shanghai Oriental Sports Center, Shanghai; Attendance: 400; Referees: Flahive (AUS), Reemnet (NED) |

| July 20, 2011; 21:00 | Report | Australia | 12–7 | China | Shanghai Oriental Sports Center, Shanghai; Attendance: 550; Referees: Koryzna (POL), Pinker (RSA) |
| July 20, 2011; 21:00 | Report | Score by quarters: 1–2, 1–2, 3–2, 7–1 | | | Shanghai Oriental Sports Center, Shanghai; Attendance: 550; Referees: Koryzna (POL), Pinker (RSA) |
| July 20, 2011; 21:00 | Report | Campbell, Younger 3 | Goals | Pan Ning, Li Bin 2 | Shanghai Oriental Sports Center, Shanghai; Attendance: 550; Referees: Koryzna (POL), Pinker (RSA) |

| July 22, 2011; 21:00 | Report | Romania | 14–10 | China | Shanghai Oriental Sports Center, Shanghai; Referees: Rotsart (USA), Deslieres (CAN) |
| July 22, 2011; 21:00 | Report | Score by quarters: 2–3, 3–3, 5–0, 4–4 | | | Shanghai Oriental Sports Center, Shanghai; Referees: Rotsart (USA), Deslieres (CAN) |
| July 22, 2011; 21:00 | Report | Radu 8 | Goals | Pan Ning 3 | Shanghai Oriental Sports Center, Shanghai; Referees: Rotsart (USA), Deslieres (CAN) |

==== Classification 13–16 ====
| July 24, 2011; 09:30 | Report | Kazakhstan | 8–7 | China | Shanghai Oriental Sports Center, Shanghai; Attendance: 1,000; Referees: Alexandrescu (ROU), Williams (NZL) |
| July 24, 2011; 09:30 | Report | Score by quarters: 2–2, 3–2, 2–0, 1–3 | | | Shanghai Oriental Sports Center, Shanghai; Attendance: 1,000; Referees: Alexandrescu (ROU), Williams (NZL) |
| July 24, 2011; 09:30 | Report | Pilipenko, Panfili 2 | Goals | Liang, Xie 2 | Shanghai Oriental Sports Center, Shanghai; Attendance: 1,000; Referees: Alexandrescu (ROU), Williams (NZL) |

==== Fifteenth place game ====
| July 26, 2011; 08:40 | Report | China | 9–4 | South Africa | Shanghai Oriental Sports Center, Shanghai; Attendance: 250; Referees: Menendez (CUB), Cabral (BRA) |
| July 26, 2011; 08:40 | Report | Score by quarters: 3–1, 2–2, 2–0, 2–1 | | | Shanghai Oriental Sports Center, Shanghai; Attendance: 250; Referees: Menendez (CUB), Cabral (BRA) |
| July 26, 2011; 08:40 | Report | Yu Lijun, Li Bin 2 | Goals | Bell 2 | Shanghai Oriental Sports Center, Shanghai; Attendance: 250; Referees: Menendez (CUB), Cabral (BRA) |

=== Women ===
Team Roster

- Jun Yang
- Fei Teng – Captain
- Liu Ping
- Yujun Sun
- Jin He
- Yating Sun
- Donglun Song
- Yuan Chen
- Yi Wang
- Huanhuan Ma
- Huizi Sun
- Lei Zhang
- Ying Wang

==== Group D ====
| Team | Pld | W | D | L | GF | GA | GD | Pts |
|---|---|---|---|---|---|---|---|---|
| Italy | 3 | 3 | 0 | 0 | 40 | 15 | +25 | 6 |
| China | 3 | 2 | 0 | 1 | 50 | 21 | +29 | 4 |
| Cuba | 3 | 0 | 1 | 2 | 19 | 40 | −21 | 1 |
| South Africa | 3 | 0 | 1 | 2 | 16 | 49 | −33 | 1 |

| July 17, 2011; 19:00 | Report | South Africa | 5–22 | China | Shanghai Oriental Sports Center, Shanghai; Attendance: 450; Referees: Deslieres (CAN); Makita (JPN) |
| July 17, 2011; 19:00 | Report | Score by quarters: 1–5, 0–6, 2–5, 2–6 | | | Shanghai Oriental Sports Center, Shanghai; Attendance: 450; Referees: Deslieres (CAN); Makita (JPN) |
| July 17, 2011; 19:00 | Report | White, Dendy Young 2 | Goals | Ma Huanhuan 6 | Shanghai Oriental Sports Center, Shanghai; Attendance: 450; Referees: Deslieres (CAN); Makita (JPN) |

| July 19, 2011; 21:00 | Report | China | 19–6 | Cuba | Shanghai Oriental Sports Center, Shanghai; Attendance: 700; Referees: Balfanbayev (KAZ), Gonzalez (PUR) |
| July 19, 2011; 21:00 | Report | Score by quarters: 6–2, 4–0, 5–2, 4–2 | | | Shanghai Oriental Sports Center, Shanghai; Attendance: 700; Referees: Balfanbayev (KAZ), Gonzalez (PUR) |
| July 19, 2011; 21:00 | Report | Wang Yi 4 | Goals | Hernendez Consuegra, Gutierrez More 2 | Shanghai Oriental Sports Center, Shanghai; Attendance: 700; Referees: Balfanbayev (KAZ), Gonzalez (PUR) |

| July 21, 2011; 21:00 | Report | Italy | 10–9 | China | Shanghai Oriental Sports Center, Shanghai; Attendance: 700; Referees: Koganov (AZE), Flahive (AUS) |
| July 21, 2011; 21:00 | Report | Score by quarters: 4–2, 2–1, 3–3, 1–3 | | | Shanghai Oriental Sports Center, Shanghai; Attendance: 700; Referees: Koganov (AZE), Flahive (AUS) |
| July 21, 2011; 21:00 | Report | Bianconi 3 | Goals | Wang Yi 3 | Shanghai Oriental Sports Center, Shanghai; Attendance: 700; Referees: Koganov (AZE), Flahive (AUS) |

==== Playoff round ====
| July 23, 2011; 21:00 | Report | Spain | 6–15 | China | Shanghai Oriental Sports Center, Shanghai; Referees: Stavridis (GRE), Naumov (RUS) |
| July 23, 2011; 21:00 | Report | Score by quarters: 2–7, 1–2, 2–3, 1–3 | | | Shanghai Oriental Sports Center, Shanghai; Referees: Stavridis (GRE), Naumov (RUS) |
| July 23, 2011; 21:00 | Report | Gil Sorli 3 | Goals | Ma Huanhuan 5 | Shanghai Oriental Sports Center, Shanghai; Referees: Stavridis (GRE), Naumov (RUS) |

==== Quarterfinals ====
| July 25, 2011; 21:00 | Report | Canada | 7–9 | China | Shanghai Oriental Sports Center, Shanghai; Attendance: 850; Referees: Stavridis (GRE), Caputi (ITA) |
| July 25, 2011; 21:00 | Report | Score by quarters: 2–3, 2–2, 3–3, 0–1 | | | Shanghai Oriental Sports Center, Shanghai; Attendance: 850; Referees: Stavridis (GRE), Caputi (ITA) |
| July 25, 2011; 21:00 | Report | Csikos 3 | Goals | Sun Yating 3 | Shanghai Oriental Sports Center, Shanghai; Attendance: 850; Referees: Stavridis (GRE), Caputi (ITA) |

==== Semifinals ====
| July 27, 2011; 21:00 | Report | Russia | 12–13 | China | Shanghai Oriental Sports Center, Shanghai; Referees: Margeta (SLO), Flahive (AUS) |
| July 27, 2011; 21:00 | Report | Score by quarters: 3–4, 3–3, 3–2, 3–4 | | | Shanghai Oriental Sports Center, Shanghai; Referees: Margeta (SLO), Flahive (AUS) |
| July 27, 2011; 21:00 | Report | Fedotova, Ekaterina Tankeeva 3 | Goals | Sun Yating, Wang Yi | Shanghai Oriental Sports Center, Shanghai; Referees: Margeta (SLO), Flahive (AUS) |

==== Gold medal game ====
| July 29, 2011; 21:00 | Report | China | 8–9 | Greece | Shanghai Oriental Sports Center, Shanghai; Attendance: 1600; Referees: Caputi (ITA), Brgulian (MNE) |
| July 29, 2011; 21:00 | Report | Score by quarters: 2-2, 0-2, 4-4, 2-1 | | | Shanghai Oriental Sports Center, Shanghai; Attendance: 1600; Referees: Caputi (ITA), Brgulian (MNE) |
| July 29, 2011; 21:00 | Report | Liu, Wang 2 | Goals | Asimaki, Roumpesi 3 | Shanghai Oriental Sports Center, Shanghai; Attendance: 1600; Referees: Caputi (ITA), Brgulian (MNE) |
