= Swimming at the 2011 World Aquatics Championships – Women's 50 metre freestyle =

Women's 50 metre freestyle at the 2011 World Aquatics Championships
- Dates: July 30, 2011 (heats and semifinals); July 31, 2011 (final)
- Competitors: 95 from 85 nations
- Winning time: 24.14

Medalists
gold medal	Therese Alshammar	Sweden
silver medal	Ranomi Kromowidjojo	Netherlands
bronze medal	Marleen Veldhuis	Netherlands

The women's 50 metre freestyle competition of the swimming events at the 2011 World Aquatics Championships was held on July 30 with the heats and the semifinals and July 31 with the final.

== Records ==
Prior to the competition, the existing world and championship records were as follows.

	Name	Nation	Time	Location	Date
World record Championship record	Britta Steffen	Germany	23.73	Rome	August 2, 2009

== Results ==
=== Heats ===
87 swimmers participated in 12 heats.

Rank	Heat	Lane	Name	Nationality	Time	Notes
1	11	4	Therese Alshammar	Sweden	24.82	Q
1	11	5	Jessica Hardy	United States	24.82	Q
3	12	5	Aleksandra Gerasimenya	Belarus	24.85	Q
4	10	5	Dorothea Brandt	Germany	24.86	Q
5	10	4	Marleen Veldhuis	Netherlands	25.01	Q
6	12	4	Ranomi Kromowidjojo	Netherlands	25.03	Q
7	11	8	Chantal van Landeghem	Canada	25.05	Q
7	12	3	Francesca Halsall	Great Britain	25.05	Q
9	10	3	Amanda Weir	United States	25.11	Q
9	12	6	Yolane Kukla	Australia	25.11	Q
11	10	8	Theodora Drakou	Greece	25.13	Q
12	10	6	Olivia Halicek	Australia	25.18	Q
13	12	2	Jeanette Ottesen	Denmark	25.23	Q
14	11	6	Victoria Poon	Canada	25.24	Q
15	9	3	Arianna Vanderpool-Wallace	Bahamas	25.28	Q, NR
16	10	7	Yayoi Matsumoto	Japan	25.34	Q
17	12	7	Triin Aljand	Estonia	25.41	
18	12	8	Flávia Delaroli	Brazil	25.47	
19	9	5	Darya Stepanyuk	Ukraine	25.50	
20	12	1	Sviatlana Khakhlova	Belarus	25.54	
21	9	8	Ragnheiður Ragnarsdóttir	Iceland	25.57	
21	11	1	Zhu Qianwei	China	25.57	
23	9	6	Hanna-Maria Seppälä	Finland	25.79	
24	9	7	Hannah Wilson	Hong Kong	25.82	
25	10	2	Karin Prinsloo	South Africa	25.89	
25	10	1	Svetlana Fedulova	Russia	25.89	
27	8	6	Burcu Dolunay	Turkey	26.01	NR
28	8	5	Liliana Ibáñez	Mexico	26.04	
29	9	2	Miroslava Najdanovski	Serbia	26.09	
30	9	1	Amanda Lim	Singapore	26.12	
31	8	4	Cecilie Johannessen	Norway	26.14	
32	8	2	Chinyere Pigot	Suriname	26.19	
33	8	7	Gabriela Ņikitina	Latvia	26.20	NR
34	8	3	Lai Kwan Chui	Malaysia	26.22	
35	8	8	Megan Fonteno	American Samoa	26.46	
36	8	1	Katarina Filova	Slovakia	26.83	
37	7	6	Anna-Liza Mopio	Papua New Guinea	26.91	
38	7	3	Nicole Horn	Zimbabwe	27.01	
39	6	5	Karen Torrez	Bolivia	27.08	
40	7	7	Jessica Vieira	Mozambique	27.11	
41	7	4	Clelia Tini	San Marino	27.15	
42	7	2	Cherelle Thompson	Trinidad and Tobago	27.21	
43	7	8	Kiera Aitken	Bermuda	27.38	
44	7	1	Christine Briedenhann	Namibia	27.46	
45	7	5	Nicola Muscat	Malta	27.56	
46	6	3	Talita Baqlah	Jordan	27.71	
47	6	4	Karen Schulz	Paraguay	27.76	
48	6	6	Fabiola Isabel Espinoza	Nicaragua	28.18	
49	5	5	Zamantha Hoss	Panama	28.19	
50	9	4	Sylvia Brunlehner	Kenya	28.20	
51	6	7	Jamila Lunkuse	Uganda	28.34	
52	5	4	Ifiezegbe Gagbe	Nigeria	28.35	
53	5	7	Ann-Marie Hepler	Marshall Islands	28.43	
54	6	8	Monica Vasilyan	Armenia	28.51	
55	6	1	Pilar Shimizu	Guam	28.71	
56	5	3	Hazboun Sabine	Palestine	29.16	
57	5	8	Keesha Keane	Palau	29.33	
58	5	6	Celeste Brown	Cook Islands	29.59	
59	6	2	Siona Huxley	Saint Lucia	29.79	
60	5	1	Amelie Trinquier	Monaco	29.94	
61	5	2	Magdalena Moshi	Tanzania	30.01	
62	4	2	Deandra van der Colff	Botswana	30.60	
63	3	2	Mariana Henriques	Angola	30.83	
64	3	6	Antoinette Guedia Mouafo	Cameroon	30.84	
65	4	3	Grace Kimball	Northern Mariana Islands	30.94	
66	4	7	Osisang Chilton	Palau	31.07	
67	4	5	Katerina Izmaylova	Tajikistan	31.38	
68	3	3	Alphonsine Agahozo	Rwanda	31.41	
68	4	1	Karin O'Reilly Clashing	Antigua and Barbuda	31.41	
70	4	6	Vitiny Hemthon	Cambodia	31.45	
71	4	8	Faleumata Samassekou	Mali	32.40	
72	3	8	Shreya Dhital	Nepal	32.44	
73	3	1	Gebremedhin Yanet Seyoum	Ethiopia	33.17	
74	3	5	Shajan Aminath	Maldives	33.43	
75	2	6	Angelika Sita Ouedraogo	Burkina Faso	33.54	
76	3	4	Sara Al Flaij	Bahrain	33.98	
77	2	2	Toure Assita	Ivory Coast	34.45	
78	2	7	Elsie Uwamahoro	Burundi	35.11	
79	2	4	Vilayphone Vongphachanh	Laos	35.99	
80	1	5	Aminata Aboubakar Yacoub	Congo	37.07	
81	2	1	Mhasin El Nour Fadlalla	Sudan	38.15	
82	2	3	Aicha Hassan Abdillahi	Djibouti	38.38	
83	2	5	Angele Gbenou	Benin	38.40	
84	1	3	Nafissa Adamou	Niger	43.36	
85	2	8	Ingrid Outtara	Burkina Faso	44.43	
86	1	2	Adzo Rebecca Kpossi	Togo	44.60	
87	4	4	Masempe Theko	Lesotho	49.75	NR
–	1	1	Vandenboss Samira	Central African Republic		DNS
–	1	4	Soukeina Abdellahi	Mauritania		DNS
-	1	6	Maihi Asono-Nathalie	DR Congo		DNS
–	1	7	Ophelia Swyne	Ghana		DNS
–	1	8	Nganga-Ngbo Tania	DR Congo		DNS
–	3	7	Sophia Adecky	Gambia		DNS
-	11	3	Britta Steffen	Germany		DNS
–	11	7	Li Zhesi	China		DNS

=== Semifinals ===
The semifinals were held at 18:57.

==== Semifinal 1 ====
Rank	Lane	Name	Nationality	Time	Notes
1	3	Ranomi Kromowidjojo	Netherlands	24.56	Q
2	6	Francesca Halsall	Great Britain	24.80	Q
3	4	Jessica Hardy	United States	25.00	Q
4	5	Dorothea Brandt	Germany	25.06	
5	2	Yolane Kukla	Australia	25.11	
6	7	Olivia Halicek	Australia	25.20	
7	1	Victoria Poon	Canada	25.26	
8	8	Triin Aljand	Estonia	25.57	

==== Semifinal 2 ====
Rank	Lane	Name	Nationality	Time	Notes
1	1	Jeanette Ottesen	Denmark	24.61	Q NR
2	4	Therese Alshammar	Sweden	24.63	Q
3	5	Aleksandra Gerasimenya	Belarus	24.69	Q
4	3	Marleen Veldhuis	Netherlands	24.88	Q
5	8	Arianna Vanderpool-Wallace	Bahamas	25.05	Q NR
6	2	Amanda Weir	United States	25.14	
7	7	Theodora Drakou	Greece	25.22	
8	6	Chantal van Landeghem	Canada	25.23	

=== Final ===
The final was held at 18:20.

Rank	Lane	Name	Nationality	Time	Notes
1st place, gold medalist(s)	3	Therese Alshammar	Sweden	24.14	
2nd place, silver medalist(s)	4	Ranomi Kromowidjojo	Netherlands	24.27	
3rd place, bronze medalist(s)	7	Marleen Veldhuis	Netherlands	24.49	
4	2	Francesca Halsall	Great Britain	24.60	
5	6	Aleksandra Gerasimenya	Belarus	24.65	
6	5	Jeanette Ottesen	Denmark	24.67	
7	8	Arianna Vanderpool-Wallace	Bahamas	24.79	NR
8	1	Jessica Hardy	United States	24.87	
