= Swimming at the 2011 World Aquatics Championships – Women's 100 metre freestyle =

Women's 100 metre freestyle at the 2011 World Aquatics Championships
- Dates: 28 July 2011 (heats and semifinals); 29 July 2011 (final)
- Competitors: 79 from 66 nations
- Winning time: 53.45

Medalists
gold medal	Jeanette Ottesen	Denmark
gold medal	Aleksandra Gerasimenya	Belarus
bronze medal	Ranomi Kromowidjojo	Netherlands

The women's 100 metre freestyle competition of the swimming events at the 2011 World Aquatics Championships was held in July 2011; the heats and the semifinals were held on 28 July and the final on 29 July.

== Records ==
Prior to the competition, the existing world and championship records were as follows.

	Name	Nation	Time	Location	Date
World record Championship record	Britta Steffen	Germany	52.07	Rome	31 July 2009

== Results ==
=== Heats ===
77 swimmers participated in 10 heats.

Rank	Heat	Lane	Name	Nationality	Time	Notes
1	8	4	Femke Heemskerk	Netherlands	53.75	Q
2	8	6	Jeanette Ottesen	Denmark	53.88	Q
3	9	3	Ranomi Kromowidjojo	Netherlands	54.10	Q
4	8	5	Dana Vollmer	United States	54.24	Q
5	10	3	Camille Muffat	France	54.35	Q
6	8	3	Yolane Kukla	Australia	54.37	Q
6	10	5	Alicia Coutts	Australia	54.37	Q
6	10	6	Tang Yi	China	54.37	Q
9	10	4	Francesca Halsall	Great Britain	54.38	Q
10	9	5	Aleksandra Gerasimenya	Belarus	54.47	Q
11	8	8	Arianna Vanderpool-Wallace	Bahamas	54.51	Q NR
12	9	4	Natalie Coughlin	United States	54.72	Q
13	8	2	Victoria Poon	Canada	54.74	Q
14	8	7	Ida Marko-Varga	Sweden	54.81	Q
15	9	1	Gabriella Fagundez	Sweden	54.81	Q
16	9	6	Britta Steffen	Germany	54.86	Q
17	10	2	Veronika Popova	Russia	54.88	
18	10	7	Amy Smith	Great Britain	54.93	
19	9	7	Wang Shijia	China	54.99	
20	7	6	Hanna-Maria Seppälä	Finland	55.06	
21	7	4	Chantal Vanlandegem	Canada	55.07	
22	10	1	Pernille Blume	Denmark	55.14	
23	8	1	Daniela Schreiber	Germany	55.24	
24	7	1	Theodora Drakou	Greece	55.52	
25	9	8	Tatiana Lemos Barbosa	Brazil	55.55	
26	6	5	Karin Prinsloo	South Africa	55.57	
27	7	3	Hannah Wilson	Hong Kong	55.71	
28	7	5	Natasha Hind	New Zealand	55.72	
29	6	4	Birgit Koschischek	Austria	55.75	
30	9	2	Evelyn Verrasztó	Hungary	55.76	
31	6	3	Sara Isakovič	Slovenia	55.81	
32	7	8	Nina Rangelova	Bulgaria	55.81	
33	6	2	Liliana Ibanez	Mexico	56.07	
34	6	6	Ragnheidur Ragnarsdottir	Iceland	56.28	
35	7	7	Natsuki Hasegawa	Japan	56.30	
36	7	2	Miroslava Najdanovski	Serbia	56.42	
37	6	8	Katarina Listopadova	Slovakia	56.52	
38	5	5	Natthanan Junkrajang	Thailand	56.86	
39	6	1	Amanda Lim	Singapore	57.00	
40	6	7	Katarina Filova	Slovakia	57.06	
41	5	2	Chinyere Pigot	Suriname	57.34	
42	5	6	Nicole Horn	Zimbabwe	57.70	
43	5	3	Megan Fonteno	American Samoa	57.85	
44	5	4	Jasmine Al-Khaldi	Philippines	58.02	
45	4	5	Karen Torrez	Bolivia	58.05	
46	4	4	Anna-Liza Mopio	Papua New Guinea	58.86	
47	5	8	Bayan Jumah	Syria	59.22	
48	5	7	Kiera Aitken	Bermuda	59.39	
49	5	1	Clelia Tini	San Marino	59.50	
50	4	3	Karen Schulz	Paraguay	59.52	
51	4	2	Christine Briedenhann	Namibia	59.55	
52	4	6	Jessica Vieira	Mozambique	1:00.14	
53	4	8	Branka Vranjes	Bosnia and Herzegovina	1:00.40	
54	4	7	Jade Ashleigh Howard	Zambia	1:01.24	
55	3	6	Britany van Lange	Guyana	1:01.39	
56	3	3	Judith Meauri	Papua New Guinea	1:01.54	
57	3	5	Monica Vasilyan	Armenia	1:01.82	
58	3	2	Zamantha Hoss	Panama	1:02.12	
59	3	1	Ifiezegbe Gagbe	Nigeria	1:02.44	
60	4	1	Fabiola Isabel Espinoza	Nicaragua	1:03.54	
61	3	4	Estellah Fils Rabetsara	Madagascar	1:03.62	
62	2	4	Amelie Trinquier	Monaco	1:04.08	
63	3	7	Reshika Udugampola	Sri Lanka	1:04.23	
64	2	3	Magdalena Moshi	Tanzania	1:05.39	
65	2	6	Celeste Brown	Cook Islands	1:05.76	
66	2	2	Kuheilani Snow	French Polynesia	1:05.99	
67	2	1	Keesha Keane	Palau	1:06.15	
68	3	8	Mareme Faye	Senegal	1:06.37	
69	2	8	Debra Daniel	Micronesia	1:06.87	
70	1	5	Osisang Chilton	Palau	1:07.62	
71	1	7	Antoinette Guedia Mouafo	Cameroon	1:09.28	
72	2	7	Grace Kimball	Northern Mariana Islands	1:09.70	
73	1	2	Shreya Dhital	Nepal	1:10.82	
74	1	4	Katerina Izmailova	Tajikistan	1:11.56	
75	1	3	Sara Al Flaij	Bahrain	1:14.86	
76	1	1	Elsie Uwamahoro	Burundi	1:17.70	
77	1	6	Sihame Ayouba Ali	Comoros	1:21.54	
–	2	5	Gouri Kotecha	Tanzania		DNS
–	10	8	Federica Pellegrini	Italy		DNS

=== Semifinals ===
The semifinals were held at 18:02.

==== Semifinal 1 ====
Rank	Lane	Name	Nationality	Time	Notes
1	6	Francesca Halsall	Great Britain	53.48	Q
2	4	Jeanette Ottesen	Denmark	53.88	Q
3	5	Dana Vollmer	United States	54.05	Q
4	2	Arianna Vanderpool-Wallace	Bahamas	54.46	NR
5	7	Victoria Poon	Canada	54.82	
6	3	Yolane Kukla	Australia	54.87	
7	1	Gabriella Fagundez	Sweden	54.92	
8	8	Amy Smith	Great Britain	55.33	

==== Semifinal 2 ====
Rank	Lane	Name	Nationality	Time	Notes
1	4	Femke Heemskerk	Netherlands	53.67	Q
2	6	Alicia Coutts	Australia	53.78	Q
3	5	Ranomi Kromowidjojo	Netherlands	53.94	Q
4	7	Natalie Coughlin	United States	54.05	Q
5	2	Aleksandra Gerasimenya	Belarus	54.26	Q
6	3	Camille Muffat	France	54.28	
7	1	Ida Marko-Varga	Sweden	54.78	
8	8	Veronika Popova	Russia	54.82	

=== Final ===
The final was held at 18:02.

Rank	Lane	Name	Nationality	Time	Notes
1st place, gold medalist(s)	6	Jeanette Ottesen	Denmark	53.45	
1st place, gold medalist(s)	8	Aleksandra Gerasimenya	Belarus	53.45	
3rd place, bronze medalist(s)	2	Ranomi Kromowidjojo	Netherlands	53.66	
4	4	Francesca Halsall	Great Britain	53.72	
4	5	Femke Heemskerk	Netherlands	53.72	
6	3	Alicia Coutts	Australia	53.81	
7	7	Dana Vollmer	United States	54.19	
8	1	Natalie Coughlin	United States	54.22	
