= Diving at the 2011 World Aquatics Championships – Women's 3 metre springboard =

The women's 3 metre springboard competition of the diving events at the 2011 World Aquatics Championships was held on July 22 with the preliminary round and the semifinal and the final on 23 July.

== Medalists ==
Gold	Silver	Bronze
Wu Minxia; China	He Zi; China	Jennifer Abel; Canada

== Results ==
The preliminary round was held on July 22 at 10:00. The semifinal was held on July 22 at 14:00. The final was held on July 23 at 17:00.

Green denotes finalists

Blue denotes semifinalists

Rank	Diver	Nationality	Preliminary		Semifinal		Final	
Rank	Diver	Nationality	Points	Rank	Points	Rank	Points	Rank
1st place, gold medalist(s)	Wu Minxia	China	345.85	2	360.65	1	380.85	1
2nd place, silver medalist(s)	He Zi	China	347.55	1	358.05	3	379.15	2
3rd place, bronze medalist(s)	Jennifer Abel	Canada	307.55	10	359.35	2	365.10	3
4	Christina Loukas	United States	321.60	6	328.95	6	350.10	4
5	Sharleen Stratton	Australia	324.45	4	327.40	8	330.75	5
6	Laura Sánchez	Mexico	325.50	3	299.80	11	329.70	6
7	Kelci Bryant	United States	313.65	8	335.25	5	322.95	7
8	Anna Pysmenska	Ukraine	301.90	12	306.25	9	317.25	8
9	Tania Cagnotto	Italy	298.50	13	299.70	12	313.45	9
10	Nadezhda Bazhina	Russia	287.00	17	327.55	7	305.60	10
11	Uschi Freitag	Germany	315.60	7	303.40	10	288.10	11
12	Émilie Heymans	Canada	324.20	5	357.90	4	270.00	12
13	Nora Subschinski	Germany	311.65	9	299.15	13		
14	Sayaka Shibusawa	Japan	280.65	18	294.60	14		
15	Olena Fedorova	Ukraine	293.90	15	289.85	15		
16	Paola Espinosa	Mexico	295.50	14	286.50	16		
17	Anastasia Pozdniakova	Russia	303.90	11	283.45	17		
18	Francesca Dallape	Italy	293.50	16	275.00	18		
19	Cheong Jun Hoong	Malaysia	276.80	19				
20	Inge Jansen	Netherlands	273.30	20				
21	Marion Fraissier	France	270.90	21				
22	Anna Lindberg	Sweden	264.05	22				
23	Choi Sut Ian	Macau	263.30	23				
24	Leyre Eizaguirre	Spain	263.05	24				
25	Jennifer Benitez	Spain	261.30	25				
26	Sophie Somloi	Austria	260.60	26				
27	Hannah Starling	Great Britain	259.40	27				
28	Anabelle Smith	Australia	256.50	28				
29	Rebecca Gallantree	Great Britain	251.45	29				
30	Fanny Bouvet	France	246.40	30				
31	Lei Sio I	Macau	246.30	31				
32	Flora Gondos	Hungary	244.65	32				
33	Yuka Mabuchi	Japan	243.35	33				
34	Chasn Sharon	Hong Kong	239.45	34				
35	Diana Pineda	Colombia	238.05	35				
36	Ng Yan Yee	Malaysia	220.20	36				
37	Huang En-Tien	Chinese Taipei	218.70	37				
38	Carolina Murillo	Colombia	194.30	38				
39	Sari Ambarwati	Indonesia	184.65	39				
40	Beannelys Velasquez	Venezuela	171.40	40				
41	Hsu Shi-Han	Chinese Taipei	152.00	41				
