= Chinese Taipei at the 2011 World Aquatics Championships =

Sporting event delegation

Flag of Chinese Taipei

Chinese Taipei competed at the 2011 World Aquatics Championships in Shanghai, China, between July 16 and 31, 2011.

== Diving ==
Chinese Taipei has qualified 2 athletes in diving.

Women

Athlete	Event	Preliminary		Semifinals		Final	
Athlete	Event	Points	Rank	Points	Rank	Points	Rank
Shih Han Hsu	Women's 1m Springboard	146.15	40			did not advance	
Shih Han Hsu	Women's 3m Springboard	152.00	41	did not advance			
En Tien Huang	Women's 1m Springboard	187.25	38			did not advance	
En Tien Huang	Women's 3m Springboard	218.70	37	did not advance			

== Swimming ==
Chinese Taipei qualified 2 swimmers.

Men

Athlete	Event	Heats		Semifinals		Final	
Athlete	Event	Time	Rank	Time	Rank	Time	Rank
Hsu Chi-Chieh	Men's 100m Butterfly	54.44	41	did not advance			
Hsu Chi-Chieh	Men's 200m Butterfly	1:59.33	26	did not advance			

Women

Athlete	Event	Heats		Semifinals		Final	
Athlete	Event	Time	Rank	Time	Rank	Time	Rank
Cheng Wan-jung	Women's 200m Butterfly	2:16.63	29	did not advance			
Cheng Wan-jung	Women's 200m IM	2:20.20	30	did not advance			
