= Open water swimming at the 2011 World Aquatics Championships – Women's 25 km =

Women's 25 km at the Open water swimming at the 2011 World Aquatics Championships
- Dates: 23 July

The Women's 25 km competition of the Open water swimming events at the 2011 World Aquatics Championships was held on July 23.

== Medalists ==
| Gold | Silver | Bronze |
|---|---|---|
| Ana Marcela Cunha (BRA) | Angela Maurer (GER) | Alice Franco (ITA) |

== Results ==
The final was held on July 23.

| Rank | Swimmer | Nationality | Time |
|---|---|---|---|
| 1st place, gold medalist(s) | Ana Marcela Cunha | Brazil | 5:29:22.9 |
| 2nd place, silver medalist(s) | Angela Maurer | Germany | 5:29:25.0 |
| 3rd place, bronze medalist(s) | Alice Franco | Italy | 5:29:30.8 |
| 4 | Olga Beresnyeva | Ukraine | 5:29:35.6 |
| 5 | Martina Grimaldi | Italy | 5:29:36.2 |
| 6 | Anna Uvarova | Russia | 5:29:38.9 |
| 7 | Celia Barrot | France | 5:29:40.8 |
| 8 | Margarita Dominguez Cabezas | Spain | 5:29:42.0 |
| 9 | Silvie Rybarova | Czech Republic | 5:29:51.3 |
| 10 | Cecilia Biagioli | Argentina | 5:29:58.7 |
| 11 | Maria Bulakhova | Russia | 5:34:21.2 |
| 12 | Karla Šitić | Croatia | 5:37:49.8 |
| 13 | Esther Nunez Morera | Spain | 5:38:09.6 |
| 14 | Tash Harrison | Australia | 5:53:35.4 |
| 15 | Cao Shiyue | China | 5:54:21.9 |
| 16 | Sun Minjie | China | 5:55:16.3 |
| 17 | Nika Kozamernik | Slovenia | 6:00:43.8 |
| – | Jana Pechanová | Czech Republic | DNF |
| – | Zaira Edith Cardenas Hernandez | Mexico | DNF |
| – | Antje Mahn | Germany | DNF |
| – | Claire Thompson | United States | DNF |
| – | Linsy Heister | Netherlands | DNS |
| – | Haley Anderson | United States | DNS |
