= Swimming at the 2011 World Aquatics Championships – Men's 200 metre butterfly =

Men's 200 metre butterfly at the 2011 World Aquatics Championships
- Dates: July 26, 2011 (heats and semifinals); July 27, 2011 (final)
- Competitors: 40 from 29 nations
- Winning time: 1:53.34

Medalists
gold medal	Michael Phelps	United States
silver medal	Takeshi Matsuda	Japan
bronze medal	Wu Peng	China

The men's 200 metre butterfly competition of the swimming events at the 2011 World Aquatics Championships was held on July 26 with the heats and the semifinals and July 27 with the final.

== Records ==
Prior to the competition, the existing world and championship records were as follows.

	Name	Nation	Time	Location	Date
World record Championship record	Michael Phelps	United States	1:51.51	Rome	July 29, 2009

== Results ==
=== Heats ===
40 athletes participated in 5 heats.

Rank	Heat	Lane	Name	Nationality	Time	Notes
1	5	7	Dinko Jukić	Austria	1:55.26	Q
2	5	1	Leonardo de Deus	Brazil	1:55.55	Q
3	3	4	Bence Biczó	Hungary	1:55.71	Q
4	3	3	Tyler Clary	United States	1:55.95	Q
5	5	4	Takeshi Matsuda	Japan	1:55.98	Q
6	5	3	Chen Yin	China	1:56.23	Q
7	3	2	Chad le Clos	South Africa	1:56.37	Q
8	5	6	László Cseh	Hungary	1:56.39	Q
9	5	5	Paweł Korzeniowski	Poland	1:56.51	Q
10	3	7	Marcin Cieślak	Poland	1:56.56	Q
11	4	4	Michael Phelps	United States	1:56.77	Q
12	3	8	Stefanos Dimitriadis	Greece	1:56.82	Q
13	3	1	Ioannis Drymonakos	Greece	1:56.88	Q
14	3	5	Kaio de Almeida	Brazil	1:56.92	Q
15	4	3	Wu Peng	China	1:56.98	Q
16	3	6	Michael Rock	Great Britain	1:57.03	Q
17	5	8	Sebastien Rousseau	South Africa	1:57.15	
18	5	2	Jayden Hadler	Australia	1:57.17	
19	2	7	Velimir Stjepanović	Serbia	1:57.40	NR
20	4	5	Ryusuke Sakata	Japan	1:57.66	
21	2	3	Robert Žbogar	Slovenia	1:57.71	NR
22	4	6	Nikolay Skvortsov	Russia	1:57.85	
23	2	6	Chang Gyu-Cheol	South Korea	1:58.02	
24	4	7	Joseph Roebuck	Great Britain	1:58.20	
25	4	1	Stefan Hirniak	Canada	1:58.72	
26	4	8	Hsu Chi-Chieh	Chinese Taipei	1:59.33	
27	2	1	Gal Nevo	Israel	1:59.68	
28	2	4	Duarte Mourao	Portugal	1:59.81	
29	2	8	Israel Duran	Mexico	2:00.55	
30	2	5	Omar Pinzón	Colombia	2:00.79	
31	1	2	Diego Castillo	Panama	2:00.80	
32	4	2	Travis Nederpelt	Australia	2:00.98	
33	1	4	Võ Thái Nguyên	Vietnam	2:01.25	
34	2	2	Jan Šefl	Czech Republic	2:01.34	
35	1	8	Hocine Haciane	Andorra	2:04.14	
36	1	6	Jessie Lacuna	Philippines	2:04.23	
37	1	3	Donny Utomo	Indonesia	2:05.23	
38	1	5	Hoàng Quý Phước	Vietnam	2:05.42	
39	1	1	Edwin Angjeli	Albania	2:06.68	
40	1	7	Rommie Benjamin	Dominican Republic	2:06.75	

=== Semifinals ===
The semifinals were held at 19.35.

==== Semifinal 1 ====
Rank	Lane	Name	Nationality	Time	Notes
1	3	Chen Yin	China	1:54.80	Q
2	5	Tyler Clary	United States	1:56.01	
3	1	Kaio de Almeida	Brazil	1:56.06	
4	2	Marcin Cieślak	Poland	1:56.13	
5	6	László Cseh	Hungary	1:56.32	
6	4	Leonardo de Deus	Brazil	1:57.58	
7	7	Stefanos Dimitriadis	Greece	1:58.16	
8	8	Michael Rock	Great Britain	1:58.78	

==== Semifinal 2 ====
Rank	Lane	Name	Nationality	Time	Notes
1	3	Takeshi Matsuda	Japan	1:54.30	Q
2	7	Michael Phelps	United States	1:54.85	Q
3	4	Dinko Jukić	Austria	1:54.94	Q
4	8	Wu Peng	China	1:55.28	Q
5	5	Bence Biczó	Hungary	1:55.35	Q
6	6	Chad le Clos	South Africa	1:55.56	Q
7	2	Paweł Korzeniowski	Poland	1:55.85	Q
8	1	Ioannis Drymonakos	Greece	1:57.77	

=== Final ===
The final was held at 18:22.

Rank	Lane	Name	Nationality	Time	Notes
1st place, gold medalist(s)	3	Michael Phelps	United States	1:53.34	
2nd place, silver medalist(s)	4	Takeshi Matsuda	Japan	1:54.01	
3rd place, bronze medalist(s)	2	Wu Peng	China	1:54.67	
4	5	Chen Yin	China	1:55.00	
5	1	Chad le Clos	South Africa	1:55.07	
6	8	Paweł Korzeniowski	Poland	1:55.39	
7	6	Dinko Jukić	Austria	1:55.48	
8	7	Bence Biczó	Hungary	1:55.53	
