= Open water swimming at the 2011 World Aquatics Championships – Men's 25 km =

Men's 25 km at the Open water swimming at the 2011 World Aquatics Championships
- Dates: 23 July

The Men's 25 km competition of the Open water swimming events at the 2011 World Aquatics Championships was held on July 23.

== Medalists ==
Gold	Silver	Bronze
Petar Stoychev (BUL)	Vladimir Dyatchin (RUS)	Csaba Gercsák (HUN)

== Results ==
The final was held on July 23.

Rank	Swimmer	Nationality	Time
1st place, gold medalist(s)	Petar Stoychev	Bulgaria	5:10:39.8
2nd place, silver medalist(s)	Vladimir Dyatchin	Russia	5:11:15.6
3rd place, bronze medalist(s)	Csaba Gercsák	Hungary	5:11:18.1
4	Francisco Jose Hervas Jodar	Spain	5:11:20.4
5	Trent Grimsey	Australia	5:11:28.2
6	Allan do Carmo	Brazil	5:11:32.2
7	Vasily Boykov	Russia	5:11:36.3
8	Joanes Hedel	France	5:13:03.1
9	Yuri Kudinov	Kazakhstan	5:13:08.6
10	Libor Smolka	Czech Republic	5:13:20.1
11	Bertrand Venturi	France	5:13:26.9
12	Erwin Maldonado	Venezuela	5:14:03.5
13	Guillermo Bertola	Argentina	5:14:29.9
14	Simon Tobin	Canada	5:19:43.1
15	Xavier Desharnais	Canada	5:20:44.2
16	Samuel de Bona	Brazil	5:27:38.1
17	Han Lidu	China	5:32:02.1
18	Gabriel Villagoiz	Argentina	5:37:25.9
19	Weng Jingwei	China	5:47:16.0
–	Josip Soldo	Croatia	DNF
–	Valerio Cleri	Italy	DNF
–	Rok Kerin	Slovenia	DNF
–	Tomislav Soldo	Croatia	DNF
–	Rostislav Vitek	Czech Republic	DNF
–	Gergely Kutasi	Hungary	DNF
–	Angel Moreira	Venezuela	DNF
–	Codie Grimsey	Australia	DNF
–	Edoardo Stochino	Italy	DNF
–	Benjamin Konschak	Germany	DNF
–	Tom Vangeneugden	Belgium	DNS
–	Islam Mohsen	Egypt	DNS
–	Alex Meyer	United States	DNS
–	Brian Ryckeman	Belgium	DNS
–	Mazen Mohamed Aziz	Egypt	DNS
–	Thomas Lurz	Germany	DNS
