= Australia at the 2011 World Aquatics Championships =

- Flag of Australia
- World Aquatics code: AUS
- National federation: Swimming Australia
- Website: swimming.org.au

in Shanghai, China
- Competitors: 97 in 5 sports
- Medals Ranked 7th: Gold 2 Silver 10 Bronze 4 Total 16

World Aquatics Championships appearances
- 1973; 1975; 1978; 1982; 1986; 1991; 1994; 1998; 2001; 2003; 2005; 2007; 2009; 2011; 2013; 2015; 2017; 2019; 2022; 2023; 2024; 2025

Australia competed at the 2011 World Aquatics Championships in Shanghai, China from 16 to 31 July 2011. Australian athletes have competed in every FINA World Aquatics Championships. Swimming Australia sent a total of 97 athletes to the Championships to compete in all 5 sports.

== Medalists ==
Medal	Name	Sport	Event	Date
Gold	James Magnussen; Matthew Targett; Matthew Abood; Eamon Sullivan; Kyle Richardson; James Roberts	Swimming	Men's 4×100 m freestyle relay	24 July
Gold	James Magnussen	Swimming	Men's 100 m freestyle	28 July
Silver	Alexandra Croak; Melissa Wu	Diving	Women's 10 m synchronized platform	18 July
Silver	Melissa Gorman; Ky Hurst; Rhys Mainstone	Open water swimming	Team	21 July
Silver	Matthew Targett	Swimming	Men's 50 m butterfly	25 July
Silver	Alicia Coutts	Swimming	Women's 100 m butterfly	25 July
Silver	Alicia Coutts	Swimming	Women's 200 m individual medley	25 July
Silver	Leisel Jones	Swimming	Women's 100 m breaststroke	26 July
Silver	Kylie Palmer	Swimming	Women's 200 m freestyle	27 July
Silver	Bronte Barratt; Blair Evans; Angie Bainbridge; Kylie Palmer; Jade Neilsen	Swimming	Women's 4×200 m freestyle relay	28 July
Silver	Belinda Hocking	Swimming	Women's 200 m backstroke	30 July
Silver	Hayden Stoeckel; Brenton Rickard; Geoff Huegill; James Magnussen; Ben Treffers; Christian Sprenger; Sam Ashby; James Roberts	Swimming	Men's 4×100 m medley relay	31 July
Bronze	Anabelle Smith; Sharleen Stratton	Diving	Women's 3 m synchronized springboard	16 July
Bronze	Geoff Huegill	Swimming	Men's 50 m butterfly	25 July
Bronze	Belinda Hocking; Leisel Jones; Alicia Coutts; Merindah Dingjan; Stephanie Rice	Swimming	Women's 4×100 m medley relay	30 July
Bronze	Stephanie Rice	Swimming	Women's 400 m individual medley	31 July

== Diving ==
Australia will send 7 divers to the 2011 World Aquatics Championships.

Men

Athlete	Event	Preliminary		Semifinals		Final	
Athlete	Event	Points	Rank	Points	Rank	Points	Rank
Grant Nel	1 m springboard	340.85	19			did not advance	
Grant Nel	3 m springboard	383.95	27	did not advance			
James Connor	10 m platform	356.60	26	did not advance			

Women

Athlete	Event	Preliminary		Semifinals		Final	
Athlete	Event	Points	Rank	Points	Rank	Points	Rank
Sharleen Stratton	1 m pringboard	282.45	3 Q			281.65	7
Sharleen Stratton	3 m springboard	324.45	4 Q	327.40	8 Q	330.75	5
Brittany Broben	1 m springboard	257.10	10 Q			267.20	11
Brittany Broben	10 m platform	276.55	15 Q	263.95	17	did not advance	
Anabelle Smith	3 m springboard	256.50	28	did not advance			
Alexandra Croak	10 m platform	320.50	8 Q	330.35	6 Q	337.75	7
Anabelle Smith; Sharleen Stratton	3 m synchronized springboard	285.90	5 Q			306.90	Bronze medal
Alexandra Croak; Melissa Wu	10 m synchronized platform	303.66	2 Q			325.92	Silver medal

== Open water swimming ==
Men

Athlete	Event	Final	
Athlete	Event	Time	Position
Codie Grimsey	5 km	56:40.4	24
Codie Grimsey	25 km	DNF	
Trent Grimsey	5 km	56:33.4	16
Trent Grimsey	25 km	5:11:28.2	5
Ky Hurst	10 km	1:54:33.9	5
Rhys Mainstone	10 km	1:55:51.5	30

Women

Athlete	Event	Final	
Athlete	Event	Time	Position
Bonnie Macdonald	5 km	1:01:08.3	21
Danielle de Francesco	5 km	1:00:46.8	8
Danielle de Francesco	10 km	2:05:47.3	31
Melissa Gorman	10 km	2:02:12.0	4
Tash Harrison	25 km	5:53.35.4	14

Mixed

Athlete	Event	Final	
Athlete	Event	Time	Position
Melissa Gorman; Ky Hurst; Rhys Mainstone	Team	57:01.8	Silver medal

== Swimming ==
Australia qualified 47 swimmers.

Men (23): Matthew Abood, Sam Ashby, Craig Calder, Ashley Delaney, Tommaso D'Orsogna, Thomas Fraser-Holmes, Jayden Hadler, Geoff Huegill, Jarrod Killey, Mitch Larkin, James Magnussen, Kenrick Monk, Ryan Napoleon, Travis Nederpelt, Kyle Richardson, Brenton Rickard, James Roberts, Christian Sprenger, Hayden Stoeckel, Eamon Sullivan, Matthew Targett, Kenneth To, Ben Treffers

Women (24): Jessica Ashwood, Angie Bainbridge, Bronte Barratt, Alicia Coutts, Merindah Dingjan, Blair Evans, Sally Foster, Katie Goldman, Melissa Gorman (pool and open water), Marieke Guehrer, Olivia Halicek, Samantha Hamill, Belinda Hocking, Leisel Jones, Rebecca Kemp, Yolane Kukla, Meagen Nay, Jade Neilsen, Kylie Palmer, Leiston Pickett, Stephanie Rice, Jessicah Schipper, Emily Seebohm, Kelly Stubbins

Men

Athlete	Event	Heats		Semifinals		Final	
Athlete	Event	Time	Rank	Time	Rank	Time	Rank
Matthew Abood	50 m freestyle	22.17	9 Q	22.16	12	did not advance	
Matt Targett	50 m freestyle	22.31	14 Q	22.09	9	did not advance	
Matt Targett	50 m butterfly	23.53	8 Q	23.41	7 Q	23.28	Silver medal
James Magnussen	100 m freestyle	48.21	2 Q	47.90	1 Q	47.63	Gold medal
James Roberts	100 m freestyle	48.93	16 Q	48.49	10	did not advance	
Kenrick Monk	200 m freestyle	1:48.42	16 Q	1:47.86	11	did not advance	
Thomas Fraser-Holmes	200 m freestyle	1:48.86	22	did not advance			
Thomas Fraser-Holmes	400 m freestyle	3:50.71	19			did not advance	
Thomas Fraser-Holmes	400 m individual medley	4:18.49	13			did not advance	
Ryan Napoleon	400 m freestyle	3:48.54	13			did not advance	
Ryan Napoleon	800 m freestyle	7:56.84	13			did not advance	
Jarrod Killey	1500 m freestyle	15:51.66	24			did not advance	
Hayden Stoeckel	50 m backstroke	25.29	13 Q	25.20	10	did not advance	
Hayden Stoeckel	100 m backstroke	54.05	9 Q	53.70	9	did not advance	
Ashley Delaney	50 m backstroke	25.33	14 Q	25.43	13	did not advance	
Ashley Delaney	200 m backstroke	2:00.15	21	did not advance			
Ben Treffers	100 m backstroke	53.89	6 Q	53.87	10	did not advance	
Mitch Larkin	200 m backstroke	2:00.52	23	did not advance			
Mitch Larkin	200 m individual medley	2:04.57	34	did not advance			
Mitch Larkin	400 m individual medley	4:26.91	25			did not advance	
Brenton Rickard	50 m breaststroke	27.89	13 Q	27.80	13	did not advance	
Brenton Rickard	100 m breaststroke	1:00.48	13 Q	1:00.04	4 Q	1:00.11	5
Brenton Rickard	200 m breaststroke	2:13.51	21	did not advance			
Christian Sprenger	100 m breaststroke	1:00.35	7 Q	1:00.44	10	did not advance	
Craig Calder	200 m breaststroke	2:13.90	26	did not advance			
Geoff Huegill	50 m butterfly	23.27	2 Q	23.26	2 Q	23.35	Bronze medal
Geoff Huegill	100 m butterfly	51.83	3 Q	51.85	6 Q	52.36	8
Sam Ashby	100 m butterfly	52.27	10 Q	52.19	11	did not advance	
Jayden Hadler	200 m butterfly	1:57.17	18	did not advance			
Travis Nederpelt	200 m butterfly	2:00.98	32	did not advance			
Kenneth To	200 m individual medley	1:59.02	3 Q	1:59.17	7 Q	1:59.26	7
James Magnussen; Matt Targett; Matthew Abood; Eamon Sullivan; Kyle Richardson*; James Roberts*	4 × 100 m freestyle relay	3:13.79	5 Q			3:11.00	Gold medal
Thomas Fraser-Holmes; Kenrick Monk; Jarrod Killey; Ryan Napoleon; Tommaso D'Orsogna*	4 × 200 m freestyle relay	7:11.80	4 Q			7:08.48	5
Hayden Stoeckel; Brenton Rickard; Geoff Huegill; James Magnussen; Ben Treffers*; Christian Sprenger*; Sam Ashby*; James Roberts*	4 × 100 m medley relay	3:34.88	5 Q			3:32.26	Silver medal

- * raced in heats only

Women

Athlete	Event	Heats		Semifinals		Final	
Athlete	Event	Time	Rank	Time	Rank	Time	Rank
Olivia Halicek	50 m freestyle	25.18	12 Q	25.20	12	did not advance	
Yolane Kukla	50 m freestyle	25.11	9 Q	25.11	10	did not advance	
Yolane Kukla	100 m freestyle	54.37	6 Q	54.87	14	did not advance	
Yolane Kukla	50 m butterfly	27.24	24	did not advance			
Alicia Coutts	100 m freestyle	54.37	6 Q	53.78	3 Q	53.81	6
Alicia Coutts	100 m butterfly	57.49	2 Q	57.41	4 Q	56.94	Silver medal
Alicia Coutts	200 m individual medley	2:11.64	5 Q	2:10.65	4 Q	2:09.00	Silver medal
Bronte Barratt	200 m freestyle	1:57.37	3 Q	1:56.90	6 Q	1:56.60	5
Bronte Barratt	400 m freestyle	4:08.62	11			did not advance	
Kylie Palmer	200 m freestyle	1:57.42	5 Q	1:56.59	3 Q	1:56.04	Silver medal
Kylie Palmer	400 m freestyle	4:06.38	5 Q			4:04.62	4
Katie Goldman	800 m freestyle	8:28.35	5 Q			8:29.20	6
Melissa Gorman	800 m freestyle	8:30.00	13			did not advance	
Melissa Gorman	1500 m freestyle	16:07.39	7 Q			16:05.98	5
Jessica Ashwood	1500 m freestyle	16:25.85	15			did not advance	
Emily Seebohm	50 m backstroke	28.39	8 Q	28.19	8 Q	28.07	5
Emily Seebohm	100 m backstroke	59.87	3 Q	59.54	4 Q	59.21	4
Belinda Hocking	50 m backstroke	28.92	20	did not advance			
Belinda Hocking	100 m backstroke	1:00.23	6 Q	59.69	6 Q	59.53	6
Belinda Hocking	200 m backstroke	2:08.50	4 Q	2:07.78	2 Q	2:06.06	Silver medal
Meagen Nay	200 m backstroke	2:08.50	4 Q	2:08.53	7 Q	2:08.69	6
Leisel Jones	50 m breaststroke	30.93	5 Q	31.14	5 Q	31.01	6
Leisel Jones	100 m breaststroke	1:07.72	6 Q	1:06.66	2 Q	1:06.25	Silver medal
Leiston Pickett	50 m breaststroke	31.07	6 Q	30.96	4 Q	30.74	4
Leiston Pickett	100 m breaststroke	1:08.06	11 Q	1:07.87	10	did not advance	
Sally Foster	200 m breaststroke	2:27.07	6 Q	2:26.43	12	did not advance	
Rebecca Kemp	200 m breaststroke	2:29.82	23	did not advance			
Marieke Guehrer	50 m butterfly	26.59	13 Q	26.12	6 Q	26.21	8
Jessicah Schipper	100 m butterfly	57.86	4 Q	57.95	7 Q	57.95	7
Jessicah Schipper	200 m butterfly	2:08.62	9 Q	2:06.93	6 Q	2:06.64	7
Stephanie Rice	200 m butterfly	2:08.43	7 Q	2:07.32	8 Q	2:06.08	5
Stephanie Rice	200 m individual medley	2:12.68	8 Q	2:09.65	1 Q	2:09.65	4
Stephanie Rice	400 m individual medley	4:37.32	5 Q			4:34.23	Bronze medal
Samantha Hamill	400 m individual medley	4:45.32	19			did not advance	
Bronte Barratt; Marieke Guehrer; Merindah Dingjan; Alicia Coutts; Kelly Stubbins*; Yolane Kukla*	4 × 100 m freestyle relay	3:38.35	5 Q			3:36.70	5
Bronte Barratt; Blair Evans; Angie Bainbridge; Kylie Palmer; Jade Neilsen*	4 × 200 m freestyle relay	7:55.68	6 Q			7:47.42	Silver medal
Belinda Hocking; Leisel Jones; Alicia Coutts; Merindah Dingjan; Stephanie Rice*	4 × 100 m medley relay	3:59.62	4 Q			3:57.13	Bronze medal

- * raced in heats only

== Synchronised swimming ==
Australia has qualified 10 athletes in synchronised swimming.

Women

Athlete	Event	Preliminary		Final	
Athlete	Event	Points	Rank	Points	Rank
Eloise Amberger; Sarah Bombell	Duet technical routine	76.400	26	did not advance	
Eloise Amberger; Sarah Bombell	Duet free routine	76.690	26	did not advance	
Eloise Amberger; Sarah Bombell; Olia Burtaev; Tamika Domrow; Bianca Hammett; Louise McConnell; Samantha Reid; Li-Ching Yew	Team technical routine	75.200	18	did not advance	
Eloise Amberger; Sarah Bombell; Olia Burtaev; Li-Ching Yew; Tamika Domrow; Bianca Hammett; Jenny-Lyn Anderson; Samantha Reid	Team free routine	76.720	17	did not advance	

Reserves

- Amie Thompson

== Water polo ==
=== Men ===
Team Roster

- Joel Dennerley
- Richard Campbell
- Timothy Cleland
- Mitchell Baird
- Robert Maitland
- Anthony Martin
- Aidan Joseph Roach
- Samuel McGregor – Captain
- Aaron Younger
- Gavin Woods
- Rhys Howden
- William Miller
- Luke Quinliven

==== Group B ====
Team	Pld	W	D	L	GF	GA	GD	Pts
Serbia	3	3	0	0	41	19	+22	6
Australia	3	2	0	1	30	27	+3	4
Romania	3	1	0	2	27	31	–4	2
China	3	0	0	3	22	43	–21	0

July 18, 2011; 12:10	Report	Romania	8–9	Australia	Shanghai Oriental Sports Center, Shanghai; Attendance: 500; Referees: Peris (CRO), Koganov (AZE)
July 18, 2011; 12:10	Report	Score by quarters: 2–1, 2–1, 3–3, 1–4			Shanghai Oriental Sports Center, Shanghai; Attendance: 500; Referees: Peris (CRO), Koganov (AZE)
July 18, 2011; 12:10	Report	Three players 2	Goals	Miller 3	Shanghai Oriental Sports Center, Shanghai; Attendance: 500; Referees: Peris (CRO), Koganov (AZE)

July 20, 2011; 21:00	Report	Australia	12–7	China	Shanghai Oriental Sports Center, Shanghai; Attendance: 550; Referees: Koryzna (POL), Pinker (RSA)
July 20, 2011; 21:00	Report	Score by quarters: 1–2, 1–2, 3–2, 7–1			Shanghai Oriental Sports Center, Shanghai; Attendance: 550; Referees: Koryzna (POL), Pinker (RSA)
July 20, 2011; 21:00	Report	Campbell, Younger 3	Goals	Pan Ning, Li Bin 2	Shanghai Oriental Sports Center, Shanghai; Attendance: 550; Referees: Koryzna (POL), Pinker (RSA)

July 22, 2011; 19:40	Report	Serbia	12–9	Australia	Shanghai Oriental Sports Center, Shanghai; Attendance: 550; Referees: Caputi (ITA), Bock (GER)
July 22, 2011; 19:40	Report	Score by quarters: 5–3, 2–1, 3–2, 2–3			Shanghai Oriental Sports Center, Shanghai; Attendance: 550; Referees: Caputi (ITA), Bock (GER)
July 22, 2011; 19:40	Report	Filipović 5	Goals	three players 2	Shanghai Oriental Sports Center, Shanghai; Attendance: 550; Referees: Caputi (ITA), Bock (GER)

==== Playoff round ====
July 24, 2011; 15:30	Report	Spain	9–8	Australia	Shanghai Oriental Sports Center, Shanghai; Attendance: 750; Referees: Brgulian (MNE), Rotsart (USA)
July 24, 2011; 15:30	Report	Score by quarters: 2–1, 3–1, 3–4, 1–2			Shanghai Oriental Sports Center, Shanghai; Attendance: 750; Referees: Brgulian (MNE), Rotsart (USA)
July 24, 2011; 15:30	Report	Perrone, García 3	Goals	three players 2	Shanghai Oriental Sports Center, Shanghai; Attendance: 750; Referees: Brgulian (MNE), Rotsart (USA)

==== Classification 9–12 ====
July 26, 2011; 12:40	Report	Australia	15–9	Japan	Shanghai Oriental Sports Center, Shanghai; Referees: Ciric (SRB), Ni (CHN)
July 26, 2011; 12:40	Report	Score by quarters: 6–4, 1–1, 3–1, 5–3			Shanghai Oriental Sports Center, Shanghai; Referees: Ciric (SRB), Ni (CHN)
July 26, 2011; 12:40	Report	three players 3	Goals	Takei 3	Shanghai Oriental Sports Center, Shanghai; Referees: Ciric (SRB), Ni (CHN)

==== Ninth place game ====
July 28, 2011; 10:50	Report	Canada	6–8	Australia	Shanghai Oriental Sports Center, Shanghai; Attendance: 300; Referees: Brgulian (MNE), Ni (CHN)
July 28, 2011; 10:50	Report	Score by quarters: 2–0, 1–2, 2–3, 1–3			Shanghai Oriental Sports Center, Shanghai; Attendance: 300; Referees: Brgulian (MNE), Ni (CHN)
July 28, 2011; 10:50	Report	Graham 3	Goals	Younger 2	Shanghai Oriental Sports Center, Shanghai; Attendance: 300; Referees: Brgulian (MNE), Ni (CHN)

=== Women ===
Team Roster

- Alicia McCormack
- Gemma Jane Beadsworth
- Sophie Elizabeth Smith
- Rebecca Marie Rippon
- Jane Moran
- Alice Bronwen Knox
- Rowena Evelyn Webster
- Kate Maree Gynther – Captain
- Glencora Ralph
- Holly Jane Lincoln Smith
- Melissa Alison Rippon
- Nicola Maree Zagame
- Victoria Jayne Brown

==== Group B ====
Team	Pld	W	D	L	GF	GA	GD	Pts
Canada	3	3	0	0	43	17	+26	6
Australia	3	2	0	1	46	16	+30	4
New Zealand	3	1	0	2	27	29	−2	2
Uzbekistan	3	0	0	3	14	68	−54	0

July 17, 2011; 12:10	Report	Australia	7–10	Canada	Shanghai Oriental Sports Center, Shanghai; Attendance: 500; Referees: Stavridis (GRE); Bock (GER)
July 17, 2011; 12:10	Report	Score by quarters: 0–2, 2–3, 2–3, 3–2			Shanghai Oriental Sports Center, Shanghai; Attendance: 500; Referees: Stavridis (GRE); Bock (GER)
July 17, 2011; 12:10	Report	Webster 2	Goals	five players 2	Shanghai Oriental Sports Center, Shanghai; Attendance: 500; Referees: Stavridis (GRE); Bock (GER)

July 19, 2011; 10:50	Report	Australia	12–4	New Zealand	Shanghai Oriental Sports Center, Shanghai; Attendance: 450; Referees: Ni (CHN), Pinker (RSA)
July 19, 2011; 10:50	Report	Score by quarters: 3–0, 2–0, 4–2, 3–2			Shanghai Oriental Sports Center, Shanghai; Attendance: 450; Referees: Ni (CHN), Pinker (RSA)
July 19, 2011; 10:50	Report	Ralph 3	Goals	Mason 2	Shanghai Oriental Sports Center, Shanghai; Attendance: 450; Referees: Ni (CHN), Pinker (RSA)

July 21, 2011; 18:20	Report	Australia	27–2	Uzbekistan	Shanghai Oriental Sports Center, Shanghai; Attendance: 400; Referees: Wengenroth (SUI), Gonzalez (PUR)
July 21, 2011; 18:20	Report	Score by quarters: 3–1, 9–0, 6–1, 9–0			Shanghai Oriental Sports Center, Shanghai; Attendance: 400; Referees: Wengenroth (SUI), Gonzalez (PUR)
July 21, 2011; 18:20	Report	three players 4	Goals	Sarancha, Plyusova 1	Shanghai Oriental Sports Center, Shanghai; Attendance: 400; Referees: Wengenroth (SUI), Gonzalez (PUR)

==== Playoff round ====
July 23, 2011; 15:30	Report	Hungary	9–10	Australia	Shanghai Oriental Sports Center, Shanghai; Attendance: 900; Referees: Margeta (SLO), Borrell (ESP)
July 23, 2011; 15:30	Report	Score by quarters: 2–3, 2–2, 1–3, 4–2			Shanghai Oriental Sports Center, Shanghai; Attendance: 900; Referees: Margeta (SLO), Borrell (ESP)
July 23, 2011; 15:30	Report	four players 2	Goals	Webster 4	Shanghai Oriental Sports Center, Shanghai; Attendance: 900; Referees: Margeta (SLO), Borrell (ESP)

==== Quarterfinals ====
July 25, 2011; 16:40	Report	Italy	14–12 (OT)	Australia	Shanghai Oriental Sports Center, Shanghai; Attendance: 550; Referees: Juhaz (HUN), Borrell (ESP)
July 25, 2011; 16:40	Report	Score by quarters: 0–1, 4–0, 4–6, 0–1 OT: 1–1 Pen 5–3			Shanghai Oriental Sports Center, Shanghai; Attendance: 550; Referees: Juhaz (HUN), Borrell (ESP)
July 25, 2011; 16:40	Report	Bianconi 4	Goals	four players 2	Shanghai Oriental Sports Center, Shanghai; Attendance: 550; Referees: Juhaz (HUN), Borrell (ESP)

==== Classification 5–8 ====
July 27, 2011; 15:30	Report	Netherlands	7–12	Australia	Shanghai Oriental Sports Center, Shanghai; Attendance: 900; Referees: Juhaz (HUN), Balfanbayev (KAZ)
July 27, 2011; 15:30	Report	Score by quarters: 1–4, 2–4, 3–3, 1–1			Shanghai Oriental Sports Center, Shanghai; Attendance: 900; Referees: Juhaz (HUN), Balfanbayev (KAZ)
July 27, 2011; 15:30	Report	van Belkum 3	Goals	Knox 4	Shanghai Oriental Sports Center, Shanghai; Attendance: 900; Referees: Juhaz (HUN), Balfanbayev (KAZ)

==== Fifth place game ====
July 29, 2011; 10:50	Report	United States	5–10	Australia	Shanghai Oriental Sports Center, Shanghai; Attendance: 250; Referees: Deslieres (CAN), Peris (CRO)
July 29, 2011; 10:50	Report	Score by quarters: 2–1, 0–4, 2–4, 1–1			Shanghai Oriental Sports Center, Shanghai; Attendance: 250; Referees: Deslieres (CAN), Peris (CRO)
July 29, 2011; 10:50	Report	Villa, Dries 2	Goals	Knox 4	Shanghai Oriental Sports Center, Shanghai; Attendance: 250; Referees: Deslieres (CAN), Peris (CRO)
