= Swimming at the 2011 World Aquatics Championships – Women's 200 metre butterfly =

Women's 200 metre butterfly at the 2011 World Aquatics Championships
- Dates: July 27, 2011 (heats and semifinals); July 28, 2011 (final)
- Competitors: 33 from 24 nations
- Winning time: 2:05.55

Medalists
gold medal	Jiao Liuyang	China
silver medal	Ellen Gandy	Great Britain
bronze medal	Liu Zige	China

The women's 200 metre butterfly competition of the swimming events at the 2011 World Aquatics Championships was held on July 27 with the heats and the semifinals and July 28 with the final.

== Records ==
Prior to the competition, the existing world and championship records were as follows.

	Name	Nation	Time	Location	Date
World record	Liu Zige	China	2:01.81	Jinan	October 21, 2009
Championship record	Jessicah Schipper	Australia	2:03.41	Rome	July 30, 2009

== Results ==
=== Heats ===
33 swimmers participated in 5 heats.

Rank	Heat	Lane	Name	Nationality	Time	Notes
1	4	5	Natsumi Hoshi	Japan	2:07.34	Q
2	4	6	Zsuzsanna Jakabos	Hungary	2:07.60	Q
3	5	6	Kathleen Hersey	United States	2:07.91	Q
4	5	5	Ellen Gandy	Great Britain	2:08.14	Q
5	5	4	Liu Zige	China	2:08.28	Q
6	3	5	Mireia Belmonte García	Spain	2:08.34	Q
7	4	2	Stephanie Rice	Australia	2:08.43	Q
8	4	4	Jiao Liuyang	China	2:08.47	Q
9	4	3	Jessicah Schipper	Australia	2:08.62	Q
10	3	3	Teresa Crippen	United States	2:08.63	Q
11	3	4	Jemma Lowe	Great Britain	2:08.67	Q
12	3	6	Audrey Lacroix	Canada	2:08.88	Q
13	3	7	Otylia Jędrzejczak	Poland	2:09.01	Q
14	3	2	Martina Granström	Sweden	2:09.12	Q
15	5	7	Choi Hye-Ra	South Korea	2:09.33	Q
16	5	1	Ida Marko-Varga	Sweden	2:09.38	Q
17	4	1	Katerine Savard	Canada	2:09.41	
18	3	8	Martina van Berkel	Switzerland	2:09.68	NR
19	5	3	Katinka Hosszú	Hungary	2:10.48	
19	5	2	Judit Ignacio Sorribes	Spain	2:10.48	
21	4	8	Mirela Olczak	Poland	2:10.69	
22	4	7	Anja Klinar	Slovenia	2:10.83	
23	2	6	Rita Medrano	Mexico	2:10.84	
24	2	4	Sara Oliveira	Portugal	2:11.37	
25	5	8	Yana Martynova	Russia	2:11.82	
26	2	3	Emilia Pikkarainen	Finland	2:12.44	
27	3	1	Alessia Polieri	Italy	2:13.65	
28	2	2	Sara Nordenstam	Norway	2:16.09	
29	2	5	Cheng Wan-Jung	Chinese Taipei	2:16.63	
30	2	7	Katarina Listopadova	Slovakia	2:17.72	
31	1	4	Simona Muccioli	San Marino	2:22.03	
32	1	3	Marie Laura Meza	Costa Rica	2:23.68	
33	1	5	Noel Borshi	Albania	2:29.16	

=== Semifinals ===
The semifinals were held at 19:03.

==== Semifinal 1 ====
Rank	Lane	Name	Nationality	Time	Notes
1	5	Ellen Gandy	Great Britain	2:06.73	Q
2	4	Zsuzsanna Jakabos	Hungary	2:06.77	Q
3	6	Jiao Liuyang	China	2:06.99	Q
4	3	Mireia Belmonte Garcia	Spain	2:07.94	
5	1	Martina Granström	Sweden	2:08.01	NR
6	7	Audrey Lacroix	Canada	2:08.70	
7	2	Teresa Crippen	United States	2:09.27	
8	8	Ida Marko-Varga	Sweden	2:09.56	

==== Semifinal 2 ====
Rank	Lane	Name	Nationality	Time	Notes
1	7	Jemma Lowe	Great Britain	2:06.30	Q
2	4	Natsumi Hoshi	Japan	2:06.65	Q
3	3	Liu Zige	China	2:06.69	Q
4	2	Jessicah Schipper	Australia	2:06.93	Q
5	6	Stephanie Rice	Australia	2:07.32	Q
6	5	Kathleen Hersey	United States	2:07.94	
7	8	Choi Hye-Ra	South Korea	2:08.81	
8	1	Otylia Jędrzejczak	Poland	2:09.27	

=== Final ===
The final was held at 18:48.

Rank	Lane	Name	Nationality	Time	Notes
1st place, gold medalist(s)	1	Jiao Liuyang	China	2:05.55	
2nd place, silver medalist(s)	6	Ellen Gandy	Great Britain	2:05.59	
3rd place, bronze medalist(s)	3	Liu Zige	China	2:05.90	
4	5	Natsumi Hoshi	Japan	2:05.91	NR
5	8	Stephanie Rice	Australia	2:06.08	
6	2	Zsuzsanna Jakabos	Hungary	2:06.35	
7	4	Jemma Lowe	Great Britain	2:06.64	
7	7	Jessicah Schipper	Australia	2:06.64	
