= Diving at the 2011 World Aquatics Championships – Women's 1 metre springboard =

The women's 1 metre springboard competition of the diving events at the 2011 World Aquatics Championships was held on July 17 with the preliminary round and the final on July 19.

== Medalists ==
Gold	Silver	Bronze
Shi Tingmao; China	Wang Han; China	Tania Cagnotto; Italy

== Results ==
The preliminary round was held at 13:00. The final was held on July 19 at 14:00.

Green denotes finalists

Rank	Diver	Nationality	Preliminary		Final	
Rank	Diver	Nationality	Points	Rank	Points	Rank
1st place, gold medalist(s)	Shi Tingmao	China	294.65	2	318.65	1
2nd place, silver medalist(s)	Wang Han	China	306.60	1	310.20	2
3rd place, bronze medalist(s)	Tania Cagnotto	Italy	253.15	12	295.45	3
4	Maria Marconi	Italy	264.25	6	290.15	4
5	Nadezhda Bazhina	Russia	262.75	7	286.20	5
6	Abby Johnston	United States	282.40	4	282.85	6
7	Sharleen Stratton	Australia	282.45	3	281.65	7
8	Anna Lindberg	Sweden	276.05	5	279.55	8
9	Kelci Bryant	United States	257.00	11	274.25	9
10	Olena Fedorova	Ukraine	258.30	9	274.15	10
11	Brittany Broben	Australia	257.10	10	267.20	11
12	Anastasia Pozdniakova	Russia	260.00	8	251.70	12
13	Hanna Pysmenska	Ukraine	251.40	13		
14	Jennifer Abel	Canada	250.95	14		
15	Sophie Somloi	Austria	249.45	15		
16	Uschi Freitag	Germany	247.70	16		
17	Sharon Chan	Hong Kong	245.10	17		
18	Inge Jansen	Netherlands	241.95	18		
19	Jun Hoong Cheong	Malaysia	241.95	18		
20	Sayaka Shibusawa	Japan	240.80	20		
21	Jennifer Benitez	Spain	232.50	21		
22	Arantxa Chavez	Mexico	232.35	22		
23	Vianey Hernandez	Mexico	227.85	23		
24	Fanny Bouvet	France	227.10	24		
25	Hannah Starling	Great Britain	226.40	25		
26	Choi Sut Ian	Macau	224.50	26		
27	Marion Farissier	France	221.65	27		
28	Julia Loennegren	Sweden	221.05	28		
29	Yuka Mabuchi	Japan	219.50	29		
30	Alicia Blagg	Great Britain	212.50	30		
31	Beannelys Velasquez	Venezuela	211.30	31		
32	Diana Pineda	Colombia	209.60	32		
33	Tina Punzel	Germany	206.05	33		
34	Maria Florencia Betancourt	Venezuela	204.90	34		
35	Sari Ambarwati	Indonesia	200.05	35		
36	Lei Sio I	Macau	192.00	36		
37	Leyre Eizaguirre	Spain	189.95	37		
38	Huang En-Tien	Chinese Taipei	187.25	38		
39	Carolina Murillo	Colombia	181.85	39		
40	Hsu Shi-Han	Chinese Taipei	146.15	40		
