= Diving at the 2011 World Aquatics Championships – Women's synchronized 10 metre platform =

The women's synchronized 10 metre platform competition at 2011 World Aquatics Championships was held on July 18 with the preliminary round in the morning and the final in the evening session.

== Medalists ==
Gold	Silver	Bronze
Wang Hao; Chen Ruolin; China	Alexandra Croak; Melissa Wu; Australia	Christin Steuer; Nora Subschinski; Germany

== Results ==
The preliminary round was held at 10:00 local time. The final was held at 17:15.

Green denotes finalists The top twelve teams advance to the final.

Rank	Diver	Nationality	Preliminary		Final	
Rank	Diver	Nationality	Points	Rank	Points	Rank
1st place, gold medalist(s)	Wang Hao; Chen Ruolin	China	335.34	1	362.58	1
2nd place, silver medalist(s)	Alexandra Croak; Melissa Wu	Australia	303.66	2	325.92	2
3rd place, bronze medalist(s)	Christin Steuer; Nora Subschinski	Germany	292.56	3	316.29	3
4	Tonia Couch; Sarah Barrow	Great Britain	290.28	4	314.52	4
5	Viktoriya Potyekhina; Iuliia Prokopchuk	Ukraine	283.62	7	311.64	5
6	Leong Mun Yee; Pandelela Rinong	Malaysia	289.50	6	305.34	6
7	Meaghan Benfeito; Roseline Filion	Canada	289.65	5	303.87	7
8	Paola Espinosa; Tatiana Ortiz	Mexico	269.49	10	298.80	8
9	Daria Govor; Yulia Koltunova	Russia	266.28	11	291.24	9
10	Choe Kum Hui; Kim Jin Ok	North Korea	273.06	8	278.64	10
11	Anna James; Mary Beth Dunnichay	United States	272.10	9	278.22	11
12	Corina Popovici; Mara Aiacoboae	Romania	253.62	12	273.48	12
13	Villő Kormos; Zsófia Reisinger	Hungary			244.68	13
14	Lisette Ramirez; Florencia Betancourt	Venezuela			221.04	14
