= Sweden at the 2011 World Aquatics Championships =

- Flag of Sweden
- FINA code: SWE
- National federation: Svenska Simidrott
- Website: www.svensksimidrott.se

in Shanghai, China
- Competitors: 5 in 2 sports
- Medals: Gold 1 Silver 1 Bronze 0 Total 2

World Aquatics Championships appearances (overview)
- 1973; 1975; 1978; 1982; 1986; 1991; 1994; 1998; 2001; 2003; 2005; 2007; 2009; 2011; 2013; 2015; 2017; 2019; 2022; 2023; 2024

Sweden competed at the 2011 World Aquatics Championships in Shanghai, China between July 16 and 31, 2011.

== Medalists ==
Medal	Name	Sport	Event	Date
Gold	Therese Alshammar	Swimming	Women's 50m Freestyle	31 July
Silver	Therese Alshammar	Swimming	Women's 50m Butterfly	30 July

== Diving ==
Sweden has qualified 5 athletes in diving.

Men

Athlete	Event	Preliminary		Semifinals		Final	
Athlete	Event	Points	Rank	Points	Rank	Points	Rank
Alexander Andresen	Men's 1m Springboard	363.95	11 Q			282.15	12
Alexander Andresen	Men's 3m Springboard	328.85	42	did not advance			
Jonathan Jörnfalk	Men's 1m Springboard	335.35	22			did not advance	
Jonathan Jörnfalk	Men's 3m Springboard	339.45	40	did not advance			
Christofer Eskilsson	Men's 10m Platform	407.65	22	did not advance			

Women

Athlete	Event	Preliminary		Semifinals		Final	
Athlete	Event	Points	Rank	Points	Rank	Points	Rank
Anna Lindberg	Women's 1m Springboard	276.05	5 Q			279.55	8
Anna Lindberg	Women's 3m Springboard	264.05	22	did not advance			
Julia Loennegren	Women's 1m Springboard	221.05	28			did not advance	
Julia Loennegren	Women's 10m Platform	200.65	32	did not advance			

== Swimming ==
Sweden qualified 20 swimmers.

Men

Athlete	Event	Heats		Semifinals		Final	
Athlete	Event	Time	Rank	Time	Rank	Time	Rank
Stefan Nystrand	Men's 50m Freestyle	22.15	6 Q	22.23	14	did not advance	
Stefan Nystrand	Men's 100m Freestyle	49.80	32	did not advance			
Robin Andreasson	Men's 200m Freestyle	1:52.21	37	did not advance			
Simon Sjodin	Men's 100m Backstroke	56.06	38	did not advance			
Simon Sjodin	Men's 200m IM	2:01.60	25	did not advance			
Mattias Carlsson	Men's 200m Backstroke	2:00.44	22	did not advance			
Jakob Dorch	Men's 50m Breaststroke	28.42	30	did not advance			
Jakob Dorch	Men's 100m Breaststroke	1:02.71	51	did not advance			
Lars Frolander	Men's 100m Butterfly	52.56	15 Q	52.34	12	did not advance	
Stefan Nystrand; Petter Stymne; Lars Frolander; Robin Andreasson	Men's 4 × 100 m Freestyle Relay	3:17.07	11			did not advance	
Simon Sjodin; Jakob Dorch; Lars Frolander; Petter Stymne	Men's 4 × 100 m Medley Relay	3:38.34	16			did not advance	

Women

Athlete	Event	Heats		Semifinals		Final	
Athlete	Event	Time	Rank	Time	Rank	Time	Rank
Therese Alshammar	Women's 50m Freestyle	24.82	1 Q	24.63	3 Q	24.14	Gold medal
Therese Alshammar	Women's 50m Butterfly	25.68	1 Q	25.52	1 Q	25.76	Silver medal
Therese Alshammar	Women's 100m Butterfly	58.71	14 Q	58.20	10	did not advance	
Gabriella Fagundez	Women's 100m Freestyle	54.81	14 Q	54.92	15	did not advance	
Gabriella Fagundez	Women's 200m Freestyle	2:00.05	27	did not advance			
Ida Marko-Varga	Women's 100m Freestyle	54.81	14 Q	54.78	11	did not advance	
Ida Marko-Varga	Women's 200m Butterfly	2:09.38	16 Q	2:09.56	16	did not advance	
Sarah Sjöström	Women's 200m Freestyle	1:58.26	12 Q	1:56.71	5 Q	1:56.41	4
Sarah Sjöström	Women's 50m Butterfly	26.17	5 Q	25.90	4 Q	25.87	4
Sarah Sjöström	Women's 100m Butterfly	58.10	6 Q	57.29	3 Q	57.38	4
Therese Svendsen	Women's 100m Backstroke	1:03.36	36	did not advance			
Therese Svendsen	Women's 200m Backstroke	2:18.12	33	did not advance			
Rebecca Ejdervik	Women's 50m Breaststroke	31.19	7 Q	31.41	8 Q	31.45	8
Jennie Johansson	Women's 50m Breaststroke	30.89	4 Q	31.16	6 Q	30.89	5
Jennie Johansson	Women's 100m Breaststroke	1:07.80	7 Q	1:08.02	11	did not advance	
Joline Höstman	Women's 100m Breaststroke	1:08.63	16 Q	1:08.55	14	did not advance	
Joline Höstman	Women's 200m Breaststroke	2:28.88	21	did not advance			
Martina Granström	Women's 200m Butterfly	2:09.12	14 Q	2:08.01	11	did not advance	
Ida Sandin	Women's 200m IM	2:16.87	23	did not advance			
Stina Gardell	Women's 200m IM	2:15.45	19	did not advance			
Stina Gardell	Women's 400m IM	4:44.53	16			did not advance	
Ida Marko-Varga; Gabriella Fagundez; Michelle Coleman; Petra Granlund	Women's 4 × 100 m Freestyle Relay	3:40.45	10			did not advance	
Ida Marko-Varga; Gabriella Fagundez; Sarah Sjöström; Stina Gardell	Women's 4 × 200 m Freestyle Relay	8:02.30	12			did not advance	
Sarah Sjöström; Joline Höstman; Martina Granström; Ida Marko-Varga	Women's 4 × 100 m Medley Relay	4:02.71	10			did not advance	
