= Macau at the 2011 World Aquatics Championships =

Sporting event delegation

Flag of Macau

Macau competed at the 2011 World Aquatics Championships in Shanghai, China between July 16 and 31, 2011.

== Diving ==
Macau has qualified 3 athletes in diving.

Women

Athlete	Event	Preliminary		Semifinals		Final	
Athlete	Event	Points	Rank	Points	Rank	Points	Rank
Sut Ian Choi	Women's 1m Springboard	224.50	26			did not advance	
Sut Ian Choi	Women's 3m Springboard	263.30	23	did not advance			
Sio I Lei	Women's 1m Springboard	192.00	36			did not advance	
Sio I Lei	Women's 3m Springboard	246.30	31	did not advance			
Sut Ian Choi; I Teng Lo	Women's 3m Synchro Springboard	253.62	12 Q			249.60	12

== Swimming ==
Macau qualified 3 swimmers.

Men

Athlete	Event	Heats		Semifinals		Final	
Athlete	Event	Time	Rank	Time	Rank	Time	Rank
Antonio Tong	Men's 50m Backstroke	28.46	31	did not advance			
Antonio Tong	Men's 100m Backstroke	1:00.34	47	did not advance			

Women

Athlete	Event	Heats		Semifinals		Final	
Athlete	Event	Time	Rank	Time	Rank	Time	Rank
Ma Cheok Mei	Women's 200m Freestyle	2:12.39	45	did not advance			
Ma Cheok Mei	Women's 200m IM	2:27.59	34	did not advance			
Lei On Kei	Women's 50m Breaststroke	32.90	24	did not advance			
Lei On Kei	Women's 200m Breaststroke	2:41.62	31	did not advance			

== Synchronised swimming ==
Macau has qualified 12 athletes in synchronized swimming.

Women

Athlete	Event	Preliminary		Final	
Athlete	Event	Points	Rank	Points	Rank
Sin Ieng Au Ieong	Solo Free Routine	68.170	28	did not advance	
Chin Kou; Wai Lam Lo	Duet Free Routine	65.910	40	did not advance	
Sin Ieng Au Ieong; Lok Ian Chan; Si Wai Chang; Ka Ieng Cheong; Sin I Ho; Chin Kou; Wai Lam Lo; Teng I Wong	Team Free Routine	68.690	19	did not advance	
Ka U Ao; Sin Ieng Au Ieong; Lok Ian Chan; Si Wai Chang; Ka Ieng Cheong; Sin I ho Chin Kou; Tsz Ching Liu; Wai Lam Lo; Teng I Wong	Free Routine Combination	71.570	11 Q	70.610	11

Reserves

- Teng Wai Lao
- Wa Hei Leong
