= United States at the 2011 World Aquatics Championships =

- Flag of the United States
- World Aquatics code: USA
- National federation: United States Aquatic Sports
- Website: www.usaquaticsports.org

in Shanghai, China
- Medals Ranked 1st: Gold 17 Silver 6 Bronze 9 Total 32

World Aquatics Championships appearances
- 1973; 1975; 1978; 1982; 1986; 1991; 1994; 1998; 2001; 2003; 2005; 2007; 2009; 2011; 2013; 2015; 2017; 2019; 2022; 2023; 2024; 2025

The American team competed at the 2011 World Aquatics Championships in Shanghai, China from July 16 to July 31. The United States topped the gold medal count in the competition with 17 golds and finished the competition with 32 total medals, behind China's 36. 16 of the 17 gold medals came from the swimming competition and one came from the open water swimming competition. Individually, Michael Phelps won the most overall medals in the competition with seven (four golds, two silvers, one bronze). Ryan Lochte won the most gold medals among the male competitors with five and finished the competition with six medals total.

== Medalists ==
Medal	Name	Sport	Event	Time/Score	Date	Ref
Gold	Andrew Gemmell; Sean Ryan; Ashley Twichell	Open water swimming	5 km team event	57:00.6	July 21	
Gold	Dana Vollmer	Swimming	Women's 100 m butterfly	56.87	July 25	
Gold	Ryan Lochte	Swimming	Men's 200 m freestyle	1:44.44	July 26	
Gold	Rebecca Soni	Swimming	Women's 100 m breaststroke	1:05.05	July 26	
Gold	Michael Phelps	Swimming	Men's 200 m butterfly	1:53.34	July 27	
Gold	Ryan Lochte	Swimming	Men's 200 m individual medley	1:54.00 (WR)	July 28	
Gold	Missy Franklin; Dagny Knutson; Katie Hoff; Allison Schmitt; Jasmine Tosky	Swimming	Women's 4×200 m freestyle relay	7:46.14	July 28	
Gold	Ryan Lochte	Swimming	Men's 200 m backstroke	1:52.96	July 29	
Gold	Rebecca Soni	Swimming	Women's 200 m breaststroke	2:21.47	July 29	
Gold	Michael Phelps; Peter Vanderkaay; Ricky Berens; Ryan Lochte; David Walters; Conor Dwyer	Swimming	Men's 4×200 m freestyle relay	7:02.67	July 29	
Gold	Missy Franklin	Swimming	Women's 200 m backstroke	2:05.10 (AM) (NR)	July 30	
Gold	Michael Phelps	Swimming	Men's 100 m butterfly	50.71	July 30	
Gold	Natalie Coughlin; Rebecca Soni; Dana Vollmer; Missy Franklin; Elizabeth Pelton; Christine Magnuson; Amanda Weir	Swimming	Women's 4×100 m medley relay	3:52.36 (AM) (NR)	July 30	
Gold	Jessica Hardy	Swimming	Women's 50 m breaststroke	30.19	July 31	
Gold	Ryan Lochte	Swimming	Men's 400 m individual medley	4:07.13	July 31	
Gold	Elizabeth Beisel	Swimming	Women's 400 m individual medley	4:31.78	July 31	
Gold	Nick Thoman; Mark Gangloff; Michael Phelps; Nathan Adrian; David Plummer; Eric Shanteau; Tyler McGill; Garrett Weber-Gale	Swimming	Men's 4×100 m medley relay	3:32.06	July 31	
Silver	David Boudia	Diving	Men's 10 m platform	544.25	July 24	
Silver	Natalie Coughlin; Missy Franklin; Jessica Hardy; Dana Vollmer; Amanda Weir; Kara Lynn Joyce	Swimming	Women's 4×100 m freestyle relay	3:34.47	July 24	
Silver	Michael Phelps	Swimming	Men's 200 m freestyle	1:44.79	July 26	
Silver	Kate Ziegler	Swimming	Women's 1500 m freestyle	15:55.60	July 26	
Silver	Michael Phelps	Swimming	Men's 200 m individual medley	1:54.16	July 28	
Silver	Tyler Clary	Swimming	Men's 400 m individual medley	4:11.17	July 31	
Bronze	Ashley Twichell	Open water swimming	Women's 5 km	1:00:40.2	July 22	
Bronze	Michael Phelps; Garrett Weber-Gale; Jason Lezak; Nathan Adrian; Ryan Lochte; Scot Robison; David Walters	Swimming	Men's 4×100 m freestyle relay	3:11.96	July 24	
Bronze	Ariana Kukors	Swimming	Women's 200 m individual medley	2:09.12	July 25	
Bronze	Natalie Coughlin	Swimming	Women's 100 m backstroke	59.15	July 26	
Bronze	Missy Franklin	Swimming	Women's 50 m backstroke	28.01	July 28	
Bronze	Tyler Clary	Swimming	Men's 200 m backstroke	1:54.69	July 29	
Bronze	Tyler McGill	Swimming	Men's 100 m butterfly	51.26	July 30	
Bronze	Kate Ziegler	Swimming	Women's 800 m freestyle	8:23.36	July 30	
Bronze	Rebecca Soni	Swimming	Women's 50 m breaststroke	30.58	July 31	

Key: (WR) = World record, (AM) = Americas record, (NR) = National record
(If a swim is a world record, it is subsequently an area and national record).

== Diving ==
There are two spots in each individual event (1 m, 3 m, and 10 m) and one team spot for each synchronized event (3 m and 10 m) that American divers are eligible for. The first selection for men's and women's 3 m and 10 m events was the 2011 USA Diving Winter National Championships, where the four divers with the top cumulative score moved onto the second selection event, the 2011 Fina USA Diving Grand Prix. At the 2011 Fina USA Diving Grand Prix, the top two divers with the highest cumulative score are selected to represent the United States.

The selection for synchronized events and the men's and women's 1 m springboard took place in May.

In all, there will be 14 divers (6 men & 8 females). The divers who are going to the 2011 Fina USA Diving Grand Prix, and are eligible to be selected to represent the United States is as follows:

Men
Athlete	Event	Preliminary		Semifinals		Final	
Athlete	Event	Points	Rank	Points	Rank	Points	Rank
Chris Colwill	Men's 1 m springboard	387.80	5 Q			427.15	4
Aaron Fleshner	Men's 1 m springboard	373.20	9 Q			364.60	9
Troy Dumais	Men's 3 m springboard	434.95	9 Q	466.80	5 Q	479.45	5
Kristian Ipsen	Men's 3 m springboard	370.60	31	Did not advance			
David Boudia	Men's 10 m platform	474.80	7 Q	486.30	4 Q	544.25	Silver medal
Nick McCrory	Men's 10 m platform	509.00	3 Q	458.50	7 Q	501.65	6
Troy Dumais; Kristian Ipsen	Men's 3 m synchronized springboard	410.64	4 Q			429.06	4
David Boudia; Nick McCrory	Men's 10 m synchronized platform	447.21	2 Q			420.69	5

Women
Athlete	Event	Preliminary		Semifinals		Final	
Athlete	Event	Points	Rank	Points	Rank	Points	Rank
Abby Johnston	Women's 1 m springboard	282.40	4 Q			282.85	6
Kelci Bryant	Women's 1 m springboard	257.00	11 Q			274.25	9
Kelci Bryant	Women's 3 m springboard	313.65	8 Q	335.25	5 Q	322.95	7
Christina Loukas	Women's 3 m springboard	321.60	6 Q	328.95	6 Q	350.10	4
Jessica Parratto	Women's 10 m platform	273.35	17 Q	294.25	15	Did not advance	
Brittany Viola	Women's 10 m platform	279.15	14 Q	305.70	12 Q	308.05	10
Kassidy Cook; Christina Loukas	Women's 3 m synchronized springboard	276.90	6 Q			288.00	7
Mary Beth Dunnichay; Anna James	Women's 10 m synchronized platform	272.10	9 Q			278.22	11

== Open water swimming ==
In the men's and women's 25 km race, both held on July 23, USA Swimming recommended its athletes not compete due to "extreme temperature conditions." USA swimming said the water temperature exceeded its recommended limit and as a result, Alex Meyer and Haley Anderson withdrew from the race. However, Claire Thompson elected to stay in the race and was afforded the opportunity because of the Amateur Sports Act, which guarantees athletes the right to compete. But USA Swimming said they would monitor her closely. Thompson did not complete the race.

Men (three have qualified).
Athlete	Event	Final	
Athlete	Event	Time	Position
Andrew Gemmell	Men's 5 km	56:24.8	5
Sean Ryan	Men's 5 km	56:30.1	11
Sean Ryan	Men's 10 km	1:55:35.7	25
Alex Meyer	Men's 10 km	1:54:33.1	4
Alex Meyer	Men's 25 km	Withdrew	

Women (five have qualified).
Athlete	Event	Final	
Athlete	Event	Time	Position
Ashley Twichell	Women's 5 km	1:00:40.2	Bronze medal
Eva Fabian	Women's 5 km	1:00:50.0	12
Eva Fabian	Women's 10 km	2:05:41.9	30
Christine Jennings	Women's 10 km	2:02:24.6	13
Claire Thompson	Women's 25 km	DNF	
Haley Anderson	Women's 25 km	Withdrew	

=== Mixed ===
Athlete	Event	Final	
Athlete	Event	Time	Position
Andrew Gemmell; Ashleyn Twichell; Sean Ryan	Team	57:00.6	Gold medal

== Swimming ==
There will be 43 swimmers (21 men & 22 females) that will compete at the 2011 World Aquatics Championships.

=== Men ===
Nathan Adrian, Mihail Alexandrov, Ricky Berens, Tyler Clary, Conor Dwyer, Mark Gangloff, Charlie Houchin, Cullen Jones, Elliott Keefer, Chad LaTourette, Jason Lezak, Ryan Lochte, Tyler McGill, Michael Phelps, David Plummer, Scot Robison, Eric Shanteau, Nick Thoman, Peter Vanderkaay, David Walters, and Garrett Weber-Gale.

=== Women ===
Amanda Beard, Elizabeth Beisel, Natalie Coughlin, Teresa Crippen, Missy Franklin, Jessica Hardy, Kathleen Hersey, Katie Hoff, Kara Lynn Joyce, Dagny Knutson, Ariana Kukors, Caitlin Leverenz, Christine Magnuson, Elizabeth Pelton, Allison Schmitt, Morgan Scroggy, Rebecca Soni, Chloe Sutton, Jasmine Tosky, Dana Vollmer, Amanda Weir, and Kate Ziegler.

=== Results ===
Men
Athlete(s)	Event	Heats		Semifinals		Final	
Athlete(s)	Event	Time	Rank	Time	Rank	Time	Rank
Nathan Adrian	Men's 50 m freestyle	22.03	2 Q	21.94	3 Q	21.93	4
Nathan Adrian	Men's 100 m freestyle	48.62	8 Q	48.05	2 Q	48.23	6
Cullen Jones	Men's 50 m freestyle	22.37	20	Did not advance			
Cullen Jones	Men's 50 m butterfly	24.19	23	Did not advance			
Jason Lezak	Men's 100 m freestyle	49.03	20	Did not advance			
Ryan Lochte	Men's 200 m freestyle	1:46.34	1 Q	1:46.11	3 Q	1:44.44	Gold medal
Ryan Lochte	Men's 200 m backstroke	1:57.34	4 Q	1:55.65	1 Q	1:52.96	Gold medal
Ryan Lochte	Men's 200 m individual medley	1:59.04	4 Q	1:56.74	1 Q	1:54.00 (WR)	Gold medal
Ryan Lochte	Men's 400 m individual medley	4:11.89	1 Q			4:07.13	Gold medal
Michael Phelps	Men's 200 m freestyle	1:46.98	5 Q	1:46.91	5 Q	1:44.79	Silver medal
Michael Phelps	Men's 100 m butterfly	51.95	5 Q	51.47	1 Q	50.71	Gold medal
Michael Phelps	Men's 200 m butterfly	1:56.77	11 Q	1:54.85	3 Q	1:53.34	Gold medal
Michael Phelps	Men's 200 m individual medley	1:59.48	8 Q	1:57.26	2 Q	1:54.16	Silver medal
Charlie Houchin	Men's 400 m freestyle	3:48.80	14			Did not advance	
Peter Vanderkaay	Men's 400 m freestyle	3:45.02	2 Q			3:44.83	4
Peter Vanderkaay	Men's 800 m freestyle	7:49.13	6 Q			7:46.64	7
Peter Vanderkaay	Men's 1500 m freestyle	14:54.99	3 Q			15:00.47	6
Chad LaTourette	Men's 800 m freestyle	7:49.94	8 Q			7:46.52	6
Chad LaTourette	Men's 1500 m freestyle	14:55.59	4 Q			14:52.36	5
David Plummer	Men's 50 m backstroke	25.22	8 Q	25.03	5 Q	24.92	5
David Plummer	Men's 100 m backstroke	53.68	3 Q	53.30	4 Q	53.04	5
Nick Thoman	Men's 50 m backstroke	25.22	8 Q	25.03	5 Q	25.01	6
Nick Thoman	Men's 100 m backstroke	54.13	10 Q	53.49	6 Q	53.01	4
Tyler Clary	Men's 200 m backstroke	1:56.32	1 Q	1:56.00	3 Q	1:54.69	Bronze medal
Tyler Clary	Men's 200 m butterfly	1:55.95	4 Q	1:56.01	9	Did not advance	
Tyler Clary	Men's 400 m individual medley	4:14.98	4 Q			4:11.17	Silver medal
Mark Gangloff	Men's 50 m breaststroke	27.49	4 Q	27.57	8 Q	27.58	6
Mark Gangloff	Men's 100 m breaststroke	1:00.29	6 Q	1:00.19	6 Q	8	1:00.52
Mihail Alexandrov	Men's 100 m breaststroke	1:01.41	25	Did not advance			
Eric Shanteau	Men's 200 m breaststroke	2:10.77	3 Q	2:10.03	4 Q	2:09.28	4
Elliott Keefer	Men's 200 m breaststroke	2:13.13	18	Did not advance			
Tyler McGill	Men's 100 m butterfly	51.76	1 Q	51.56	3 Q	51.26	Bronze medal
Heats; Garrett Weber-Gale (48.49); Ryan Lochte (48.28); Scot Robison (48.62); David Walters (48.11); Final; Michael Phelps (48.08); Garrett Weber-Gale (48.33); Jason Lezak (48.15); Nathan Adrian (47.40)	Men's 4×100 m freestyle relay	3:13.50	2 Q			3:11.96	Bronze medal
Heats; David Walters (1:48.01); Conor Dwyer (1:47.31); Richard Berens (1:46.99); Peter Vanderkaay (1:46.53); Final; Michael Phelps (1:45.53); Peter Vanderkaay (1:46.07); Richard Berens (1:46.51); Ryan Lochte (1:44.56)	Men's 4×200 m freestyle relay	7:08.84	1 Q			7:02.67	Gold medal
Heats; David Plummer (53.97); Eric Shanteau (1:00.13); Tyler McGill (51.00); Garrett Weber-Gale (47.32) Final; Nick Thoman (53.61); Mark Gangloff (1:00.24); Michael Phelps (50.57); Nathan Adrian (47.64)	Men's 4×100 m medley relay	3:32.42	1 Q			3:32.06	Gold medal

Women
Athlete(s)	Event	Heats		Semifinals		Final	
Athlete(s)	Event	Time	Rank	Time	Rank	Time	Rank
Jessica Hardy	Women's 50 m freestyle	24.82	1 Q	25.00	7 Q	24.87	8
Jessica Hardy	Women's 50 m breaststroke	30.20	1 Q	30.40	1 Q	30.19	Gold medal
Amanda Weir	Women's 50 m freestyle	25.11	9 Q	25.14	11	Did not advance	
Natalie Coughlin	Women's 100 m freestyle	54.72	12 Q	54.05	6 Q	54.22	8
Natalie Coughlin	Women's 100 m backstroke	59.73	1 Q	59.38	1 Q	59.15	Bronze medal
Dana Vollmer	Women's 100 m freestyle	54.24	4 Q	54.05	6 Q	54.19	7
Dana Vollmer	Women's 50 m butterfly	25.98	3 Q	26.32	8 Q	26.06	7
Dana Vollmer	Women's 100 m butterfly	56.97	1 Q	56.47	1 Q	56.87	Gold medal
Allison Schmitt	Women's 200 m freestyle	1:56.66	1 Q	1:57.07	8 Q	1:56.98	6
Morgan Scroggy	Women's 200 m freestyle	1:59.22	20	Did not advance			
Chloe Sutton	Women's 400 m freestyle	4:08.22	9			Did not advance	
Chloe Sutton	Women's 800 m freestyle	8:27.72	3 Q			8:24.05	4
Chloe Sutton	Women's 1500 m freestyle	16:13.20	9			Did not advance	
Katie Hoff	Women's 400 m freestyle	4:07.93	8 Q			4:08.22	7
Kate Ziegler	Women's 800 m freestyle	8:28.28	4 Q			8:23.36	Bronze medal
Kate Ziegler	Women's 1500 m freestyle	16:02.53	3 Q			15:55.60	Silver medal
Elizabeth Pelton	Women's 50 m backstroke	28.35	5 Q	28.85	16	Did not advance	
Elizabeth Pelton	Women's 100 m backstroke	1:00.19	5 Q	1:00.14	12	Did not advance	
Elizabeth Beisel	Women's 200 m backstroke	2:08.40	3 Q	2:07.82	3 Q	2:08.16	5
Elizabeth Beisel	Women's 400 m individual medley	4:34.95	1 Q			4:31.78	Gold medal
Missy Franklin	Women's 50 m backstroke	28.37	6 Q	28.14	6 Q	28.01	Bronze medal
Missy Franklin	Women's 200 m backstroke	2:07.71	1 Q	2:05.90 †, ‡	1 Q	2:05.10 †, ‡	Gold medal
Rebecca Soni	Women's 50 m breaststroke	30.72	2 Q	30.74	2 Q	30.58	Bronze medal
Rebecca Soni	Women's 100 m breaststroke	1:05.54	1 Q	1:04.91	1 Q	1:05.05	Gold medal
Rebecca Soni	Women's 200 m breaststroke	2:23.30	1 Q	2:21.03	1 Q	2:21.47	Gold medal
Amanda Beard	Women's 100 m breaststroke	1:08.51	14 Q	1:08.64	15	Did not advance	
Amanda Beard	Women's 200 m breaststroke	2:26.73	4 Q	2:25.99	11	Did not advance	
Christine Magnuson	Women's 50 m butterfly	26.20	6 Q	26.43	11	Did not advance	
Christine Magnuson	Women's 100 m butterfly	58.49	10 Q	58.59	12	Did not advance	
Kathleen Hersey	Women's 200 m butterfly	2:07.91	3 Q	2:07.94	9	Did not advance	
Teresa Crippen	Women's 200 m butterfly	2:08.63	10 Q	2:09.27	14	Did not advance	
Caitlin Leverenz	Women's 200 m individual medley	2:11.01	1 Q	2:11.15	6 Q	2:10.40	5
Caitlin Leverenz	Women's 400 m individual medley	4:36.78	3 Q			4:38.80	8
Ariana Kukors	Women's 200 m individual medley	2:11.84	6 Q	2:09.83	2 Q	2:09.12	Bronze medal
Heats; Amanda Weir (54.35); Missy Franklin (53.57); Kara Lynn Joyce (54.10); Jessica Hardy (53.62); Final; Natalie Coughlin (54.09); Missy Franklin (52.99); Jessica Hardy (54.12); Dana Vollmer (53.27)	Women's 4×100 m freestyle relay	3:35.64	1 Q			3:34.47	Silver medal
Heats; Missy Franklin (1:56.98); Katie Hoff (1:57.01); Jasmine Tosky (1:59.20); Dagny Knutson (1:57.27); Final; Missy Franklin (1:55.06); Dagny Knutson (1:57.18); Katie Hoff (1:57.41); Allison Schmitt (1:56.49)	Women's 4×200 m freestyle relay	7:50.46	1 Q			7:46.14	Gold medal
Heats; Elizabeth Pelton (1:00.19); Rebecca Soni (1:04.97); Christine Magnuson (57.54); Amanda Weir (54.25); Final; Natalie Coughlin (59.12); Rebecca Soni (1:04.71); Dana Vollmer (55.74); Missy Franklin (52.79)	Women's 4×100 m medley relay	3:56.95	1 Q			3:52.36 †, ‡	Gold medal

Key: (WR) = World record, † = Americas record, ‡ = National record

== Synchronized swimming ==
United States has qualified 10 athletes in synchronised swimming.

Women
Athlete	Event	Preliminary		Final	
Athlete	Event	Points	Rank	Points	Rank
Mary Killman	Solo Technical Routine	87.700	10 Q	87.100	11
Mary Killman; Lyssa Wallace	Duet Technical Routine	89.000	8 Q	88.500	9
Mary Killman; Lyssa Wallace	Duet Free Routine	87.970	10 Q	86.190	11
Morgan Fuller; Megan Hansley; Mary Killman; Maria Koroleva; Michelle Moore; Leah Pinette; Lyssa Wallace; Alison Williams	Team Technical Routine	88.100	9 Q	87.900	9
Morgan Fuller; Megan Hansley; Mary Killman; Michelle Moore; Leah Pinette; Lyssa Wallace; Katy Wiita; Alison Williams	Team Free Routine	87.780	9 Q	86.800	10

Reserve

- Heidi Homma

== Water polo ==
=== Men ===
Team Roster

- Merill Moses
- Peter Varellas
- Peter Hudnut
- Jeffery Powers
- Adam Wright
- Brain Alexander
- Ronald Beaubien
- Anthony Azevedo – Captain
- Timothy Hutten
- Jesse Smith
- Shea Buckner
- Andrew Stevens

==== Preliminary round ====
For the preliminary round, the United States has been grouped with Italy, Germany, and South Africa.

==== Group D ====
Team	Pld	W	D	L	GF	GA	GD	Pts
Italy	3	3	0	0	32	12	+20	6
Germany	3	2	0	1	31	22	+9	4
United States	3	1	0	2	32	20	+12	2
South Africa	3	0	0	3	12	53	–41	0

==== Results ====
July 18, 2011; 18:20	Report	United States	7–9	Germany	Shanghai Oriental Sports Center, Shanghai; Attendance: 800; Referees: Brgulian (MNE), Stavridis (GRE)
July 18, 2011; 18:20	Report	Score by quarters: 0–4, 2–2, 4–1, 1–2			Shanghai Oriental Sports Center, Shanghai; Attendance: 800; Referees: Brgulian (MNE), Stavridis (GRE)
July 18, 2011; 18:20	Report	Azevedo 2	Goals	Oeler 3	Shanghai Oriental Sports Center, Shanghai; Attendance: 800; Referees: Brgulian (MNE), Stavridis (GRE)

July 20, 2011; 17:00	Report	United States	5–8	Italy	Shanghai Oriental Sports Center, Shanghai; Attendance: 650; Referees: Margeta (SLO), Tulga (TUR)
July 20, 2011; 17:00	Report	Score by quarters: 1–2, 1–2, 1–3, 2–1			Shanghai Oriental Sports Center, Shanghai; Attendance: 650; Referees: Margeta (SLO), Tulga (TUR)
July 20, 2011; 17:00	Report	Alexander 2	Goals	Gitto, Felugo 2	Shanghai Oriental Sports Center, Shanghai; Attendance: 650; Referees: Margeta (SLO), Tulga (TUR)

July 22, 2011; 12:10	Report	United States	20–3	South Africa	Shanghai Oriental Sports Center, Shanghai; Attendance: 450; Referees: Reemnet (NED), Menendez (CUB)
July 22, 2011; 12:10	Report	Score by quarters: 5–0, 4–1, 5–0, 6–2			Shanghai Oriental Sports Center, Shanghai; Attendance: 450; Referees: Reemnet (NED), Menendez (CUB)
July 22, 2011; 12:10	Report	Azevedo 5	Goals	three players 1	Shanghai Oriental Sports Center, Shanghai; Attendance: 450; Referees: Reemnet (NED), Menendez (CUB)

==== Playoff round ====
July 24, 2011; 16:50	Report	Canada	4–17	United States	Shanghai Oriental Sports Center, Shanghai; Attendance: 800; Referees: Ciric (SRB), Korzyna (POL)
July 24, 2011; 16:50	Report	Score by quarters: 2–5, 0–6, 2–4, 0–2			Shanghai Oriental Sports Center, Shanghai; Attendance: 800; Referees: Ciric (SRB), Korzyna (POL)
July 24, 2011; 16:50	Report	Diggle 2	Goals	four players 3	Shanghai Oriental Sports Center, Shanghai; Attendance: 800; Referees: Ciric (SRB), Korzyna (POL)

==== Quarterfinals ====
July 26, 2011; 14:00	Report	Hungary	9–8	United States	Shanghai Oriental Sports Center, Shanghai; Attendance: 450; Referees: Koryzna (POL), Flahive (AUS)
July 26, 2011; 14:00	Report	Score by quarters: 1–3, 3–2, 3–2, 2–1			Shanghai Oriental Sports Center, Shanghai; Attendance: 450; Referees: Koryzna (POL), Flahive (AUS)
July 26, 2011; 14:00	Report	three players 2	Goals	Varellas, Bailey 3	Shanghai Oriental Sports Center, Shanghai; Attendance: 450; Referees: Koryzna (POL), Flahive (AUS)

==== Classification 5–8 ====
July 28, 2011; 12:10	Report	United States	9–8	Germany	Shanghai Oriental Sports Center, Shanghai; Attendance: 350; Referees: Caputi (ITA), Menendez (CUB)
July 28, 2011; 12:10	Report	Score by quarters: 4–2, 4–2, 0–2, 1–2			Shanghai Oriental Sports Center, Shanghai; Attendance: 350; Referees: Caputi (ITA), Menendez (CUB)
July 28, 2011; 12:10	Report	Bailey 2	Goals	Kreuzmann, Oeler 2	Shanghai Oriental Sports Center, Shanghai; Attendance: 350; Referees: Caputi (ITA), Menendez (CUB)

==== Fifth place game ====
July 30, 2011; 10:50	Report	United States	10–11	Spain	Shanghai Oriental Sports Center, Shanghai; Referees: Ciric (SRB), Flahive (AUS)
July 30, 2011; 10:50	Report	Score by quarters: 0-4, 3-2, 3-2, 4-3			Shanghai Oriental Sports Center, Shanghai; Referees: Ciric (SRB), Flahive (AUS)
July 30, 2011; 10:50	Report	Varellas 3	Goals	Molina Rios, Perez Vargas 3	Shanghai Oriental Sports Center, Shanghai; Referees: Ciric (SRB), Flahive (AUS)

=== Women ===
Team Roster

- Elizabeth Anne Armstrong
- Heather Danielle Petri
- Melissa Jon Seidemann
- Brenda Villa
- Lauren Ashley Wenger
- Margaret Ann Steffens
- Courtney Mathewson
- Jessica Marie Steffens
- Elsie Ann Windes
- Kelly Kristen Rulon
- Annika Madsen Dries
- Kameryn Louise Craig
- Tumuaialii Anae

==== Preliminary round ====
For the preliminary round, the United States has been grouped with the Netherlands, Kazakhstan, and Hungary.

==== Group A ====
Team	Pld	W	D	L	GF	GA	GD	Pts
United States	3	2	1	0	37	18	+19	5
Netherlands	3	1	2	0	29	19	+10	4
Hungary	3	1	1	1	37	31	+6	3
Kazakhstan	3	0	0	3	13	48	−35	0

==== Results ====
July 17, 2011; 09:30	Report	Netherlands	7–7	United States	Shanghai Oriental Sports Center, Shanghai; Attendance: 700; Referees: Caputi (ITA); Margets (SLO)
July 17, 2011; 09:30	Report	Score by quarters: 1–1, 2–2, 3–2, 1–2			Shanghai Oriental Sports Center, Shanghai; Attendance: 700; Referees: Caputi (ITA); Margets (SLO)
July 17, 2011; 09:30	Report	Vermeer 3	Goals	Wenger 3	Shanghai Oriental Sports Center, Shanghai; Attendance: 700; Referees: Caputi (ITA); Margets (SLO)

July 19, 2011; 18:20	Report	Hungary	7–16	United States	Shanghai Oriental Sports Center, Shanghai; Attendance: 650; Referees: Bock (GER), Naumov (RUS)
July 19, 2011; 18:20	Report	Score by quarters: 2–3, 2–4, 3–5, 0–4			Shanghai Oriental Sports Center, Shanghai; Attendance: 650; Referees: Bock (GER), Naumov (RUS)
July 19, 2011; 18:20	Report	Szűcs 3	Goals	Mathewson 3	Shanghai Oriental Sports Center, Shanghai; Attendance: 650; Referees: Bock (GER), Naumov (RUS)

July 21, 2011; 17:00	Report	Kazakhstan	4–14	United States	Shanghai Oriental Sports Center, Shanghai; Attendance: 600; Referees: Ciric (SRB), Menendez (CUB)
July 21, 2011; 17:00	Report	Score by quarters: 3–4, 0–4, 0–4, 1–2			Shanghai Oriental Sports Center, Shanghai; Attendance: 600; Referees: Ciric (SRB), Menendez (CUB)
July 21, 2011; 17:00	Report	Chebotova 2	Goals	Dries, Craig 3	Shanghai Oriental Sports Center, Shanghai; Attendance: 600; Referees: Ciric (SRB), Menendez (CUB)

==== Quarterfinals ====
July 25, 2011; 14:00	Report	United States	7–9	Russia	Shanghai Oriental Sports Center, Shanghai; Attendance: 450; Referees: Tulga (TUR), Bock (GER)
July 25, 2011; 14:00	Report	Score by quarters: 2–0, 3–2, 1–5, 1–2			Shanghai Oriental Sports Center, Shanghai; Attendance: 450; Referees: Tulga (TUR), Bock (GER)
July 25, 2011; 14:00	Report	Seidemann, Wenger 2	Goals	Prokofyeva 5	Shanghai Oriental Sports Center, Shanghai; Attendance: 450; Referees: Tulga (TUR), Bock (GER)

==== Classification 5–8 ====
July 27, 2011; 12:10	Report	United States	8–4	Canada	Shanghai Oriental Sports Center, Shanghai; Attendance: 250; Referees: Naumov (RUS), Menendez (CUB)
July 27, 2011; 12:10	Report	Score by quarters: 2–2, 2–0, 2–1, 2–1			Shanghai Oriental Sports Center, Shanghai; Attendance: 250; Referees: Naumov (RUS), Menendez (CUB)
July 27, 2011; 12:10	Report	Petri 2	Goals	Csikos 2	Shanghai Oriental Sports Center, Shanghai; Attendance: 250; Referees: Naumov (RUS), Menendez (CUB)

==== Fifth place game ====
July 29, 2011; 10:50	Report	United States	5–10	Australia	Shanghai Oriental Sports Center, Shanghai; Attendance: 250; Referees: Deslieres (CAN), Peris (CRO)
July 29, 2011; 10:50	Report	Score by quarters: 2–1, 0–4, 2–4, 1–1			Shanghai Oriental Sports Center, Shanghai; Attendance: 250; Referees: Deslieres (CAN), Peris (CRO)
July 29, 2011; 10:50	Report	Villa, Dries 2	Goals	Knox 4	Shanghai Oriental Sports Center, Shanghai; Attendance: 250; Referees: Deslieres (CAN), Peris (CRO)
