= Swimming at the 2011 World Aquatics Championships – Women's 200 metre individual medley =

Women's 200m IM, 2011 Aquatics

Women's 200 metre individual medley at the 2011 World Aquatics Championships
- Dates: July 24, 2011 (heats and semifinals); July 25, 2011 (final)
- Competitors: 38 from 30 nations
- Winning time: 2:08.90

Medalists
gold medal	Ye Shiwen	China
silver medal	Alicia Coutts	Australia
bronze medal	Ariana Kukors	United States

The women's 200 metre individual medley competition of the swimming events at the 2011 World Aquatics Championships took place July 24 and 25. The heats and semifinals took place July 24 and the final was held July 25.

== Records ==
Prior to the competition, the existing world and championship records were as follows.

	Name	Nation	Time	Location	Date
World record Championship record	Ariana Kukors	United States	2:06.15	Rome	July 27, 2009

== Results ==
=== Heats ===
38 swimmers participated in 5 heats, qualified swimmers are listed:

Rank	Heat	Lane	Name	Nationality	Time	Notes
1	4	3	Caitlin Leverenz	United States	2:11.01	Q
2	3	5	Mireia Belmonte Garcia	Spain	2:11.38	Q
3	3	4	Katinka Hosszú	Hungary	2:11.53	Q
4	5	4	Ye Shiwen	China	2:11.63	Q
5	4	4	Alicia Coutts	Australia	2:11.64	Q
6	4	5	Ariana Kukors	United States	2:11.84	Q
7	3	3	Hannah Miley	Great Britain	2:11.95	Q
8	5	3	Stephanie Rice	Australia	2:12.68	Q
9	3	2	Choi Hye-Ra	South Korea	2:13.00	Q
10	3	6	Julia Wilkinson	Canada	2:13.16	Q
11	5	2	Kirsty Coventry	Zimbabwe	2:13.32	Q
12	5	5	Evelyn Verrasztó	Hungary	2:13.33	Q
13	5	6	Erica Morningstar	Canada	2:13.71	Q
14	4	8	Barbora Závadová	Czech Republic	2:14.08	Q
15	4	7	Siobhan-Marie O'Connor	Great Britain	2:14.30	Q
16	3	1	Fanny Lecluyse	Belgium	2:14.97	Q
17	4	2	Zhu Xiaoya	China	2:14.98	
18	5	8	Katheryn Anne Meaklim	South Africa	2:15.15	
19	5	1	Stina Gardell	Sweden	2:15.45	
20	5	7	Yuliya Efimova	Russia	2:15.56	
21	2	4	Ganna Dzerkal	Ukraine	2:16.17	
22	2	2	Ranohon Amanova	Uzbekistan	2:16.75	
23	4	1	Ida Sandin	Sweden	2:16.87	
24	3	8	Jördis Steinegger	Austria	2:17.09	
25	2	3	Tanja Smid	Slovenia	2:17.45	
26	2	8	Hrafnhildur Lúthersdóttir	Iceland	2:18.20	NR
27	3	7	Alessia Polieri	Italy	2:18.69	
28	2	1	Nadia Vieira	Portugal	2:19.74	
29	2	6	Emilia Pikkarainen	Finland	2:19.94	
30	2	5	Cheng Wan-jung	Chinese Taipei	2:20.20	
31	1	4	Natthanan Junkrajang	Thailand	2:20.38	
32	2	7	Erla Haraldsdóttir	Iceland	2:21.86	
33	1	5	Samantha Arevalo	Ecuador	2:22.39	NR
34	1	6	Ma Cheok Mei	Macau	2:27.59	
35	1	3	Nibal Yamout	Lebanon	2:27.93	
36	1	7	Daniella van den Berg	Aruba	2:30.02	
37	1	2	Loreen Whitfield	American Samoa	2:31.97	
	4	6	Rita Medrano	Mexico	DNS	

=== Semifinals ===
The semifinals were held at 18:24.

==== Semifinal 1 ====
Rank	Lane	Name	Nationality	Time	Notes
1	6	Stephanie Rice	Australia	2:09.65	Q
2	3	Ariana Kukors	United States	2:09.83	Q
3	5	Ye Shiwen	China	2:10.08	Q
4	2	Julia Wilkinson	Canada	2:11.76	Q
5	4	Mireia Belmonte Garcia	Spain	2:12.37	
6	7	Evelyn Verrasztó	Hungary	2:12.51	
7	8	Fanny Lecluyse	Belgium	2:13.68	NR
8	1	Barbora Závadová	Czech Republic	2:14.03	

==== Semifinal 2 ====
Rank	Lane	Name	Nationality	Time	Notes
1	3	Alicia Coutts	Australia	2:10.65	Q
2	6	Hannah Miley	Great Britain	2:10.95	Q
3	5	Caitlin Leverenz	United States	2:11.15	Q
4	5	Katinka Hosszú	Hungary	2:11.71	Q
5	7	Kirsty Coventry	Zimbabwe	2:12.21	
6	1	Erica Morningstar	Canada	2:12.67	
7	8	Siobhan-Marie O'Connor	Great Britain	2:13.26	
8	2	Choi Hye-Ra	South Korea	2:15.90	

=== Final ===
The final was held 19:17.

Rank	Lane	Name	Nationality	Time	Notes
1st place, gold medalist(s)	3	Ye Shiwen	China	2:08.90	
2nd place, silver medalist(s)	6	Alicia Coutts	Australia	2:09.00	
3rd place, bronze medalist(s)	5	Ariana Kukors	United States	2:09.12	
4	4	Stephanie Rice	Australia	2:09.65	
5	7	Caitlin Leverenz	United States	2:10.40	
6	1	Katinka Hosszú	Hungary	2:11.24	
7	2	Hannah Miley	Great Britain	2:11.36	
8	8	Julia Wilkinson	Canada	2:16.18	
