= Diving at the 2011 World Aquatics Championships – Women's synchronized 3 metre springboard =

The women's synchronized 3 metre springboard competition at 2011 World Aquatics Championships was held on July 16 with the preliminary round in the morning and the final in the evening session. These were the first gold medals awarded of the 2011 World Aquatics Championships. The top three teams advanced to the 2012 Summer Olympics.

== Medalists ==
Gold	Silver	Bronze
Wu Minxia; He Zi; China	Émilie Heymans; Jennifer Abel; Canada	Anabelle Smith; Sharleen Stratton; Australia

== Results ==
The preliminary round was held at 10:00 local time. The final was held at 17:15.

Green denotes finalists The top twelve teams advanced to the final.

Rank	Diver	Nationality	Preliminary		Final	
Rank	Diver	Nationality	Points	Rank	Points	Rank
1st place, gold medalist(s)	Wu Minxia; He Zi	China	324.90	1	356.40	1
2nd place, silver medalist(s)	Émilie Heymans; Jennifer Abel	Canada	275.10	8	313.50	2
3rd place, bronze medalist(s)	Anabelle Smith; Sharleen Stratton	Australia	285.90	5	306.90	3
4	Hanna Pysmenska; Olena Fedorova	Ukraine	291.90	2	302.40	4
5	Katja Dieckow; Uschi Freitag	Germany	276.90	6	299.40	5
6	Francesca Dallapé; Tania Cagnotto	Italy	288.30	3	297.60	6
7	Christina Loukas; Kassidy Cook	United States	276.90	6	288.00	7
8	Svetlana Philippova; Anastasia Pozdniakova	Russia	288.12	4	282.72	8
9	Arantxa Chavez; Laura Sánchez	Mexico	272.10	9	278.10	9
10	Leong Mun Yee; Ng Yan Yee	Malaysia	254.40	11	264.60	10
11	Fanny Bouvet; Marion Farissier	France	255.84	10	254.10	11
12	Lo I Teng; Choi Sut Ian	Macau	253.62	12	249.60	12
13	Mai Nakagawa; Sayaka Shibusawa	Japan	247.80	13		
14	Flora Gondos; Zsofia Reisinger	Hungary	241.38	14		
15	Alicia Blagg; Rebecca Gallantree	Great Britain	239.40	15		
16	Eleni Katsouli; Iouliana Banousi	Greece	235.23	16		
17	Jennifer Benitez; Leyre Eizaguirre	Spain	235.14	17		
18	Ngai Ho Wing; Chan Sharon	Hong Kong	192.18	18		
