= Song Wenyan =

Chinese swimmer (born 1992)

Personal information
- Born: April 9, 1992 (age 34) Shandong, China

Sport
- Sport: Swimming

Song Wenyan (born 9 April 1992) is a Chinese swimmer. She competed for China at the 2012 Summer Olympics in the 200 m freestyle.

== See also ==
- China at the 2012 Summer Olympics - Swimming
