= Antoinette Guedia Mouafo =

Cameroonian swimmer (born 1995)

Personal information
- Full name: Antoinette Joyce Guedia Mouafo
- Nationality: Cammeroonian
- Born: 21 October 1995 (age 30)

Sport
- Sport: Swimming
- Strokes: freestyle, breaststroke

Antoinette Joyce Guedia Mouafo (born 21 October 1995) is a Cameroonian swimmer.

She began swimming in 2003, at the age of 8, and became national champion in the women's 100 metre breaststroke category in 2006.

Guedia represented Cameroon at the 2008 Summer Olympics in Beijing, and was, at the age of 12, the youngest athlete of any nationality at the Games. Competing in the 50 metre freestyle, she finished fourth in her heat with a time of 33.59 seconds. She had trained in a 22-metre pool in a hotel in Cameroon.

She competed in the women's 50m freestyle at the 2012 Summer Olympics in London, finishing with a time of 29.28 seconds in 53rd place in the heats.
