= Open water swimming at the 2009 World Aquatics Championships =

- Host city: Rome
- Date(s): 21-25 July
- Events: 6

The Open Water Swimming competition at the 2009 World Aquatics Championships were held from 21 to 25 July at the beach of Ostia in Rome.

== Schedule ==
Date	Events
Tuesday, July 21	Women's 5K, Men's 5K
Wednesday, July 22	Women's 10K, Men's 10K
Saturday, July 25	Women's 25K, Men's 25K

Note: Originally, the Open water events were scheduled to occur on Sunday, July 19 (5K), Tuesday, July 21 (women's 10K) and Thursday, July 23 (women's 25K); however the FINA Bureau on July 18, 2009, altered the open water schedule due to weather conditions in Ostia.

== Medal table ==
Rank	Nation	Gold	Silver	Bronze	Total
1	Germany (GER)	3	0	0	3
2	Australia (AUS)	1	1	0	2
3	Italy (ITA)	1	0	2	3
4	Great Britain (GBR)	1	0	0	1
5	Russia (RUS)	0	3	1	4
6	United States (USA)	0	1	1	2
7	Greece (GRE)	0	1	0	1
8	Brazil (BRA)	0	0	1	1
8	South Africa (RSA)	0	0	1	1
Totals (9 entries)		6	6	6	18

== Medal summary ==
=== Men ===
Event	Gold	Silver	Bronze
5 km	Thomas Lurz (GER)	Spyridon Gianniotis (GRE)	Chad Ho (RSA)
10 km	Thomas Lurz (GER)	Andrew Gemmell (USA)	Fran Crippen (USA)
25 km	Valerio Cleri (ITA)	Trent Grimsey (AUS)	Vladimir Dyatchin (RUS)

=== Women ===
Event	Gold	Silver	Bronze
5 km	Melissa Gorman (AUS)	Larisa Ilchenko (RUS)	Poliana Okimoto (BRA)
10 km	Keri-Anne Payne (GBR)	Ekatarina Seliverstova (RUS)	Martina Grimaldi (ITA)
25 km	Angela Maurer (GER)	Anna Uvarova (RUS)	Federica Vitale (ITA)
