= Open water swimming at the 2009 World Aquatics Championships – Men's 25 km =

Men's 25 km at the 2009 World Aquatics Championships
- Location: Rome
- Dates: 25 July
- Competitors: 23 from 15 nations

The Men's 25 km Open Water swimming race took place on Saturday, 25 July, at Ostia beach in Rome. 23 men from 15 countries competed. Valerio Cleri of Italy took home the gold with a time of 5:26:31.6.

== Results ==
Rank	Swimmer	Nationality	Time
1st place, gold medalist(s)	Valerio Cleri	Italy	5:26:31.6
2nd place, silver medalist(s)	Trent Grimsey	Australia	5:26:50.7
3rd place, bronze medalist(s)	Vladimir Dyatchin	Russia	5:29:29.3
4	Brian Ryckeman	Belgium	5:30:18.4
5	Loic Branda	France	5:30:20.9
6	Bertrand Venturi	France	5:30:22.9
7	Brendan Capell	Australia	5:30:27.5
8	Rostislav Vitek	Czech Republic	5:32:38.8
9	Simon Tobin-Daignault	Canada	5:34:48.2
10	Libor Smolka	Czech Republic	5:35:06.4
11	Sean Ryan	United States	5:36:22.2
12	Andrea Volpini	Italy	5:36:37.9
13	Manuel Chiu	Mexico	5:39:12.1
14	Rodrigo Elorza	Mexico	5:43:26.4
15	Danill Serebrennikov	Russia	5:46:21.7
16	Arseniy Lavrentyev	Portugal	5:48:43.0
17	Saleh Mohammad	Syria	5:49:30.6
18	Adel El-Behary	Egypt	5:54:00.3
--	Evgenij Pop Avec	Macedonia	OTL
--	Mohammed Jassim Alghareeb	Saudi Arabia	DNF
--	Alex Meyer	United States	DSQ
--	Mazen Metwaly	Egypt	DNS
--	Diego Nogueira Montero	Spain	DNS

Key: OTL = Over Time Limit, DSQ = Disqualified, DNF = Did not finish, DNS = Did not start

== See also ==
- Open water swimming at the 2007 World Aquatics Championships – Men's 25 km
