= 2010 FINA World Open Water Swimming Championships – Men's 10K =

The Men's 10K race at the 2010 FINA World Open Water Swimming Championships was swum on Sunday, July 18, 2010, in Roberval, Quebec, Canada.

The race began at 11:30 a.m., and was swum in the Lac Saint-Jean in the city centre. 37 men swam the event.

The 10-kilometre distance of the race was reached by completed 4 laps of the 2.5-kilometre course set up for the championships.

== Results ==
All times in hours : minutes : seconds

Place	Swimmer	Country	Time	Notes
1	Valerio Cleri	Italy	2:00:59.3	
2	Evgeny Drattsev	Russia	2:01:00.6	
3	Vladimir Dyatchin	Russia	2:01:03.0	
4	Fran Crippen	USA	2:01:05.0	
5	Luca Ferretti	Italy	2:01:07.8	
6	Thomas Lurz	Germany	2:01:08.5	
7	Chip Peterson	USA	2:01:10.0	
8	Igor Chervynskiy	Ukraine	2:01:12.9	
9	Petar Stoychev	Bulgaria	2:01:13.0	
10	Allan do Carmo	Brazil	2:01:15.2	
11	Rodrigo Elorza	Mexico	2:01:17.5	
12	Bertrand Venturi	France	2:01:18.0	
13	Richard Weinberger	Canada	2:01:20.6	
14	Julien Codevelle	France	2:01:28.3	
15	David Browne	Australia	2:01:56.9	
16	Sergiy Fesenko	Ukraine	2:02:14.5	
17	Simon Tobin	Canada	2:02:17.3	
18	Iván López	Mexico	2:02:20.3	
19	Christian Reichert	Germany	2:02:51.4	
20	Tom Vangeneugden	Belgium	2:03:01.7	
21	Filipe Alcantra	Brazil	2:03:12.2	
22	Chad Ho	South Africa	2:04:44.5	
23	Michael Dmitriev	Israel	2:05:45.1	
24	Ivan Enderica Ochoa	Ecuador	2:06:16.9	
25	Jan Posmourny	Czech Republic	2:06:44.7	
26	Jakub Fichtl	Czech Republic	2:09:42.4	
27	Tomislav Soldo	Croatia	2:13:11.5	
28	Michal Skrodzki	Poland	2:24:30.7	
–	Josip Soldo	Croatia	DSQ	
–	Diego Nogueira Montera	Spain	DNF	
–	Kostiantyn Ukradyga	Ukraine	DNF	
–	Rhys Mainstone	Australia	DNF	
–	Daniel Fogg	Great Britain	DNF	
–	Fancisco Jose Hervas Jadar	Spain	DNF	
–	Thomas Allen	Great Britain	DNF	
–	Brian Ryckeman	Belgium	DNF	
–	Spyridon Gianniots	Greece	DNF	
