= 2010 FINA World Open Water Swimming Championships – Men's 5K =

The Men's 5K race at the 2010 FINA World Open Water Swimming Championships was swum on Tuesday, July 20, 2010 in Roberval, Quebec, Canada.

The race began at 2 p.m., and was swum in the Lac Saint-Jean in the city centre. 29 men swam the event.

The 5 kilometre distance of the race was reached by completed 2 laps of the 2.5-kilometre course set up for the championships.

== Results ==
All times in hours:minutes:seconds

Place	Swimmer	Country	Time	Notes
1	Thomas Lurz	Germany	57:42.6	
2	Evgeny Drattsev	Russia	57:44.1	
3	Fran Crippen	USA	57:46.5	
4	Igor Chervynskiy	Ukraine	57:48.4	
5	Spyridon Gianniots	Greece	57:49.3	
6	Rhys Mainstone	Australia	57:51.6	
7	Chad Ho	South Africa	57:57.7	
8	Luca Ferretti	Italy	57:59.1	
9	Jan Posmourny	Czech Republic	58:00.1	
10	Simone Ruffini	Italy	58:00.4	
11	Sergey Fesenko	Azerbaijan	58:00.5	
12	Ivan Enderica Ochoa	Ecuador	58:00.7	
13	Diego Nogueira Montera	Spain	58:01.1	
14	Fancisco Jose Hervas Jadar	Spain	58:01.5	
15	Samuel de Bona	Brazil	58:02.0	
16	Sebastien Fraysse	France	58:02.0	
17	Richard Weinberger	Canada	58:02.9	
18	Daniel Fogg	Great Britain	58:02.9	
19	Allan do Carmo	Brazil	58:03.5	
20	Andrew Beato	Australia	58:03.6	
21	Chip Peterson	USA	58:04.0	
22	Julien Sauvage	France	58:04.4	
23	Jan Wolfgarten	Germany	58:04.4	
24	Kostiantyn Ukradyga	Ukraine	58:04.7	
25	Daniil Serebrennikov	Russia	58:05.8	
26	Rodrigo Elorza	Mexico	58:07.7	
27	Jakub Fichtl	Czech Republic	59:16.9	
28	Manuel Chiu	Mexico	1:02:34.2	
29	Tomas Vachan	Slovakia	1:04:05.0	
