= 2010 FINA World Open Water Swimming Championships – Women's 5K =

The Women's 5K race at the 2010 FINA World Open Water Swimming Championships was swum on Tuesday, July 20, 2010, in Roberval, Quebec, Canada.

The race began at 10:30 a.m., and was swum in the Lac Saint-Jean in the city centre. 35 women swam the event.

The 5 kilometre distance of the race was reached by completed 2 laps of the 2.5-kilometre course set up for the championships.

== Results ==
All times in hours:minutes:seconds

Place	Swimmer	Country	Time	Notes
1	Eva Fabian	USA	1:02:00.99	
2	Giorgia Consiglio	Italy	1:02:01.09	
3	Ana Marcela Cunha	Brazil	1:02:02.69	
4	Poliana Okimoto	Brazil	1:02:02.79	
5	Christine Jennings	USA	1:02:02.79	
6	Aurélie Muller	France	1:02:04.49	
7	Kalliopi Araouzou	Greece	1:02:04.79	
8	Teja Zupan	Slovenia	1:02:06.39	
9	Cara Baker	New Zealand	1:02:07.29	
10	Karla Šitić	Croatia	1:02:07.59	
11	Alice Franco	Italy	1:02:08.29	
12	Yurema Requena	Spain	1:02:09.19	
13	Jana Pechanová	Czech Republic	1:02:11.39	
14	Ophélie Aspord	France	1:02:13.59	
15	Cassandra Patten	Great Britain	1:02:18.09	
16	Fang Yanqiao	China	1:02:18.89	
17	Olga Beresnyeva	Ukraine	1:02:23.79	
18	Danielle de Fransesco	Australia	1:02:26.29	
19	Nadine Reichert	Germany	1:02:29.69	
20	Bonnie Macdonald	Australia	1:02:37.69	
21	Natalie du Toit	South Africa	1:02:38.19	
22	Maria Bulakhova	Russia	1:02:41.09	
23	Li Xue	China	1:02:42.09	
24	Katia Barros Esquivel	Ecuador	1:02:47.99	
25	Karyn Jewel	Canada	1:03:22.59	
26	Nataly Caldas Calle	Ecuador	1:03:26.49	
27	Alejandra Gonzalez	Mexico	1:04:46.89	
28	Inha Kotsur	Azerbaijan	1:05:18.29	
29	Zsofia Balazs	Canada	1:05:30.29	
30	Odette Saldivar	Mexico	1:06:55.99	
31	Alexandra Farkasova	Slovakia	1:06:55.99	
–	Ekaterina Seliverstova	Russia	DQ	
–	Anastasia Zhidkova	Azerbaijan	DNS	
–	Keri-anne Payne	Great Britain	DNS	
–	Marianna Lymperta	Greece	DNS	
