= Dick Shoulberg =

American swimming coach

Richard "Dick" Shoulberg
- Shoulberg circa 1983

Biographical details
- Born: c. 1940; Norristown, Pennsylvania

Playing career
- circa 1954-58: Norristown High School

Coaching career (HC unless noted)
- 1959-1960: Penn Square Swim Club; Norristown, Pa. Dates Approximate
- 1958-1968: Norristown YWCA
- 1960-1972: Mermaid Swim Club
- 1968-1969: Roxborough YMCA
- 1969-2015: Germantown Academy
- 1969-1985 2000-2015: Germantown Academy; Aquatic Club
- 1985-2000: Foxcatcher Swim Club
- 1987-1990: U.S. Women's Olympic Team; Asst. Coach
- 1992: Assistant US Olympic Swim Team Coach (Men)

Head coaching record
- Overall: From 1969-2009; Germantown Academy Win % Men 82% Women 98%

Accomplishments and honors

Championships
- 2 x Men’s National Prep School Champions; 1985, 1986; 5 x Women’s Prep School Champions; 1986, 1987, 1992, 1994, 2004, 2005; Top eight at Senior Nationals (Germantown Academy)

Awards
- ASCA Coach of the Year Award 1982, 1989; NISCA Hall of Fame Award 2000; NISCA Nat. Colleg. & Schol. Swim. Trophy 1996

Dick Shoulberg was an American Hall of Fame club, Prep School, and U.S. Olympic swim coach best known for coaching swimming at Pennsylvania's Germantown Academy in Fort Washington. From 1969 to 2015, he led the Germantown Academy men's team to two National Prep School Championships, and the Women's team to five women's Prep School Championships. He also coached and founded the prestigious Germantown Academy Aquatic age group team, which merged with the Foxcatcher Swim Club from 1985 to 2000.

Born in Norristown, Pennsylvania, in Norriton township outside Philadelphia, Shoulberg swam for Norristown High School where he graduated and then did a year of additional studies at Malvern Preparatory School. At Norristown High, Shoulberg helped manage the Track Team under Coach Pete Lewis, and had dreams of coaching as a profession. Despite choosing swim coaching as a career, Shoulberg has noted he was not an exceptional high school swimmer, never broke a standing record, and never swam for a college team. A Norristown area native, he lived within a two-mile radius of East Norriton township in the Philadelphia area his entire life. After High School, he served in the U.S. Army from 1958 to 1959 and then from 1961 to 1962.

== Early coaching ==
After his service in the army, he started work as a precision machinist, married his wife Molly around 1958, and eventually had four children, Steve, Rick, Becky and Bert. He began swim coaching at the Norristown YWCA upon his return from military service around 1958, remaining there through 1968. From 1959 to 1960, he coached at Penn Square Swim Club. Some minor discrepancies exist among sources as to the exact dates of his coaching years prior to his time at Germantown Academy, so the dates provided by the American Swimming Coaches Association are used. He had a long stint at the Mermaid Swim Club from 1958 to 1968, and coached at the Roxborough YMCA from 1968 to 1969.

== Germantown Academy coach ==
Shoulberg began coaching at Germantown Academy in 1969, and remained there through a 45-year career, retiring in 2015. According to one account, he got the job by applying to a classified ad. His teams at Germantown Academy twice captured the Men's National Prep School Championships in 1985 and 1986, and the Germantown women took five National Prep School Championships in 1986, 1987, 1992, 1994, 2004 and 2005. His Prep School teams have finished in the top eight at Senior National Championships. With exceptionally high winning records, since 1969 through around 1990, the winning percentage for his women's team has been 98% and his men's team around 82%. He also coached his Germantown Academy Aquatic Club during this period.

=== Foxcatcher and Germantown Academy Aquatic (GAAC) clubs ===
While at Germantown Academy, Shoulberg coached the prestigious Foxcatcher Swim Club which initially met at Newtown Square's Foxcatcher Farm swimming facilities. Foxcatcher merged with Shoulberg's Germantown Academy Aquatic Club (GAAC) which was under the Foxcatcher name from 1985 to 2000. Foxcatcher was a prestigious club that was started by Hall of Fame Coach Frank Keefe in 1976 and initially practiced at John DuPont's Foxcatcher Farm's six-lane 50-meter pool. Keefe left the club to Coach at Yale in September 1978, but a string of outstanding coaches followed. After 2000, the Germantown Academy Aquatic Club continued under its original name. While coaching at GAAC, Shoulberg had two of his swimmers capture new World Records and more than eight of his swimmers set American records. A large number of the swimmers in his program have set a number of both High School and National Records.

By 2015, Shoulberg coached with the Plymouth Whitemarsh Aquatic Club in his later career with Caroline Bouland, continuing through at least 2019.

== Top swimmers ==
His top swimmers have included Distance swimmer Fran Crippen, Whitney Jorgensen, a stroke and 200 IM specialist who swam for Boise State, and Alicia Aemisegger, a Princeton IM swimmer who swam the 400 IM in the 2008 Olympic Trials, twice made the Olympic trial finals, and would Assistant Coach at New York University. Shoulberg also coached Katie Riefenstahl, a six-time University of Texas All American, and Sierra Schmidt, a University of Michigan swimmer and 2016 World Cup Medalist in freestyle who swam for Shoulberg's Germantown Academy from 2012 to 2014 where she competed in the 1650 and 500 freestyle. At Plymouth Whitemarsh Aquatic Club, Shoulberg coached 2017-2019 Pan American Games and World Junior Swimming Championships six-time freestyle gold medalist Andrew Abruzzo. Shoulberg also coached Bill Smythe who was fourth in the 200-meter backstroke in the 1992 Olympic trials, and later coached Intermediate Medley and Distance swimming at the University of Virginia.

=== Olympians coached ===
Olympians he has coached include Fran's sister Maddy Crippen (2000), who would later coach at Villanova, Alex Fung (2000), a backstroke and IM Olympic competitor for Hong Kong, Pathunyu "Guy" Yimsomruay (2000), Dave Wharton (1988, 1992), David Berkoff (1992), Sean Killion (1992), Karin LaBerge (1980), Dan Jorgenson (1988), Trina Radke (1988), Erika Hansen (1988), and Sue Heon (1984). David Berkoff, Dan Jorgensen, Sean Killian and Dave Wharton trained with Shoulberg at Germantown Academy Aquatics Club and Foxcatcher Swim Club for the 1992 swim season in preparation for the Olympics. Shoulberg's work as an Olympic Coach and Advisor in the 1988 and 1992 Olympics and with the U.S. Olympic team gave him extra time to work with Olympians.

Since 1969 he has produced in excess of 300 Preparatory School and High School All-American swimming student-athletes from Germantown Academy and from his club team Germantown Academy Aquatic Club which use the Prep School's swimming facilities. Like many Hall of Fame Coaches Shoulberg was characterized by several of his swimmers as tough and at times a disciplinarian, and could be intimidating. His swimmer David Wharton believed Shoulberg was "one of the best technique coaches in the world."

== Swimming community work ==
Shoulberg offered swimming clinics on a global basis over many years, in countries that include Australia, Canada, China, England, France, Germany, Guam, Hong Kong, Ireland, Japan, Mexico, Russian, Spain, Thailand, Israel, Finland, and the United States. He had been the author of swimming related articles in the American Swimming Coaches Association Magazine, NISCA Magazine, Swimming Technique Magazine, and Swimming World. He wrote a chapter on Individual Medley Training for The Swim Coaches Bible, and a number of his swimmers were world rated individual medley competitors. He was Head Coach of the USA Jr. Team in 2006 and 2008. He helped Coach the August 1988 Pan Pacifics in Tokyo, and the World Championships in Perth, Australia in January, 1991.

=== Honors ===
In 2003, he was inducted into the Montgomery County Coaches Hall of Fame, and in 2000 received the National Interscholastic Swimming Coaches Association of America (NISCA) Hall of Fame Award. He was awarded the NISCA National Collegiate & Scholastic Swimming Trophy in 1996. In 1995, he was inducted into Germantown Academy Hall of Fame, and received the Coach of the Year Award from the American Swimming Coaches Association (ASCA) in both 1982 and 1989. In 1987, he became a member of the Pennsylvania Aquatic Hall of Fame, and was inducted into the Pennsylvania Hall of Fame in 1986.
