= Evgeny Drattsev =

Russian swimmer (born 1983)

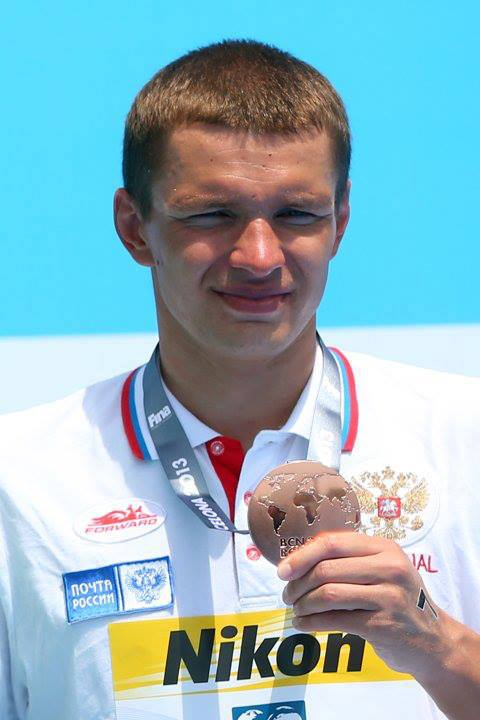

Personal information
- Full name: Yevgeny Yuryevich Drattsev
- National team: Russia
- Born: 24 January 1983 (age 43) Yaroslavl, Russian SFSR, Soviet Union
- Height: 1.80 m (5 ft 11 in)
- Weight: 74 kg (163 lb)

Sport
- Sport: Swimming
- Strokes: Open water
Medal record
World Championships
Silver medal – second place	2007 Melbourne	5 km marathon
Bronze medal – third place	2007 Melbourne	10 km marathon
Bronze medal – third place	2011 Shanghai	5 km marathon
Bronze medal – third place	2013 Barcelona	25 km marathon
Bronze medal – third place	2017 Budapest	25 km marathon
World Open Water Championships
Silver medal – second place	2010 Roberval	5 km marathon
Silver medal – second place	2010 Roberval	10 km marathon
Bronze medal – third place	2006 Naples	10 km marathon
European Championships
Silver medal – second place	2014 Berlin	25 km marathon
Bronze medal – third place	2010 Budapest	10 km marathon
Bronze medal – third place	2014 Berlin	10 km marathon
European Open Water Championships
Silver medal – second place	2008 Dubrovnik	5 km
Silver medal – second place	2008 Dubrovnik	5 km team

Yevgeny Yuryevich Drattsev (also Evgeny Drattsev, Russian: Евгений Юрьевич Дратцев; born 24 January 1983) is a Russian swimmer, who specialized in open water marathon. He is considered one of the fastest professional open water swimmers in the world, finishing near the top of FINA World Cup races for the 10 km marathon. He also won two medals (silver and bronze) for the 5 and 10 km open water marathon at the 2007 FINA World Championships in Melbourne, Australia.

== Biography ==
Drattsev qualified for the 2008 Summer Olympics in Beijing, after placing fifth from the FINA World Open Water Swimming Championships in Seville, Spain. He swam in the first-ever men's 10 km open water marathon against 24 other competitors, including former pool swimmers Petar Stoychev of Bulgaria and Thomas Lurz of Germany, and his teammate Vladimir Dyatchin. Drattsev finished the race in fifth place, with a time of 1:52:08.9, approximately 17 seconds behind winner Maarten van der Weijden of the Netherlands.

At the 2009 FINA World Championships in Rome, Italy, Drattsev displayed a poor performance in the open water marathon, finishing fifth in the 5 km and twelfth in the 10 km. The following year, he recaptured his success by winning two silver medals for the same categories at the 2010 FINA World Open Water Swimming Championships in Roberval, Quebec, Canada. He also reinforced his lead in the FINA 10 km Marathon Swimming World Cup circuit, reaching the top position in all eight meets of the series, including his first-place finish in Santos, Brazil. Drattsev continued his medal streak in the 10 km marathon by claiming the bronze at the 2010 European Aquatics Championships in Balatonfüred, Hungary, with a time of 1:54:26.6.

In 2011, Drattsev won the gold medal at the third stage of FINA Open Water Swimming Grand Prix in Viedma, Argentina, with a time of 2:33:07, three seconds ahead of his teammate Sergey Bolshakov (2:33:10). Drattsev eventually qualified for the FINA World Championships in Shanghai, China, where he won the bronze medal in the men's 5 km marathon, with a time of 56:18.5, approximately one second behind Greece's Spyridon Gianniotis. He also achieved a fifth-place finish in the team trials, along with his fellow open water swimmers Sergey Bolshakov and Ekaterina Seliverstova.

In 2012, Drattsev withdrew from the FINA Olympic Marathon Swim Qualifier in Setubal, Portugal, to focus on his competitive career for the FINA 10 km Marathon Swimming World Cup circuit. Although he did not win a single meet of the series, Drattsev was able to take home two bronze medals in Viedma, Argentina (second stage) and in Eilat, Israel (third stage).
