= Eva Fabian =

American-Israeli open water swimmer (born 1993)

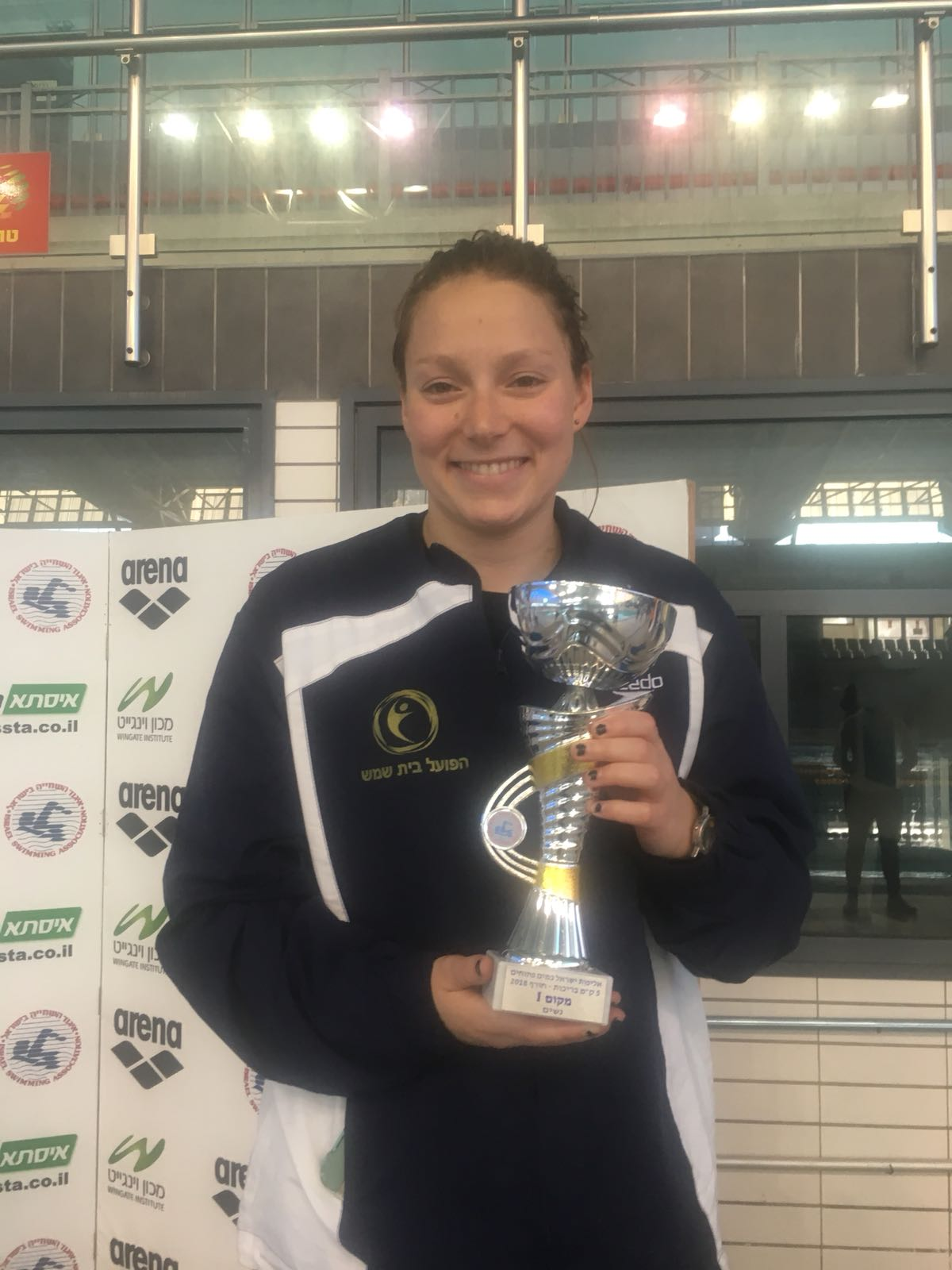
- Eva Fabian, Israeli champion in 5 km, February 2018

Personal information
- Native name: אווה פביאן
- National team: United States Israel
- Born: August 3, 1993 (age 33) Frederick, Maryland, U.S.
- Occupations: Professional swimmer High Technology
- Height: 5 ft 3 in (160 cm)
- Weight: 125 lb (57 kg)
- Spouse: Zohar Tavor (m 2022)

Sport
- Sport: Swimming
- Strokes: Freestyle
- Club: Greenwood Memorial Swim Club; Wingate Institute (Netanya)
- College team: Yale University
- Coach: Jack Fabian (father); Don Lemieux (Greenwood SC); Jim Henry (Yale); Hanan Gilad (Israel)
Medal record
Women's swimming
Representing the United States
World Championships
Bronze medal – third place	2013 Barcelona	25 km open water
World Open Water Championships
Gold medal – first place	2010 Roberval	5 km open water
Pan Pacific Championships
Silver medal – second place	2010 Irvine	10 km open water
Silver medal – second place	2014 Gold Coast	10 km open water
Pan American Games
Gold medal – first place	2015 Toronto	10 km open water

Eva Fabian (Hebrew: אווה פביאן; born August 3, 1993) is an American-Israeli open water swimmer. She was the 2010 world champion in the 5-kilometer swim, and won a gold medal at the 2015 Pan American Games in the women's 10k. After her move to Israel in 2017, she continued to compete in open water events and swam with the Israeli national team, before retiring from swimming in 2024. After her swimming retirement, she worked for a high technology firm, residing in Netanya, Israel with her spouse, Zohar Tavor whom she married in 2022.

== Early life ==
Fabian was born August 23, 1993, in Frederick, Maryland, to mother Claire, a doctor, and father Jack Fabian, a professor and swim coach, noted fro training open water swimmers, who played collegiate rugby. After starting competitive training around the age of six, she became interested in Open Water swimming after completing a pier-to-pier ocean race in New Jersey at age eleven. Graduating in 2012, she was educated through Oak Meadow High School, a private school in Vermont focused on distance learning, where she was homeschooled. Homeschooling was a convenience due to the frequent travel required by her international swim meets. She has an older brother, Max, who was also a swimmer. She spent several of her High School years in Keene, New Hampshire, and swam for the Greenwood Memorial Swim Club in nearby Gardner, Massachusetts, a strong program, 30 miles Southeast of Keene. The Greenwood Swim Club had a long history training at the Greenwood Memorial Pool in Gardner, and had produced national high school champions and Samantha Arsenault, a 2000 Olympic gold medalist. At Greenwood, later known as Greenwood Aquatics, Fabian was managed by Head Coach Don Lemieux, who trained swimmers at Greenwood from around 1981–2024. Fabian may have also received some training from Michael Spring, of Crimson Aquatics, a noted distance coach. Fabian's best events during her High School years were in distance competitions and included the 500, 1000, and 1650 yard freestyle.

=== Yale University ===
She attended Yale University, from 2012 to 2016 where she competed in swimming under women's Head coach Jim Henry and graduated with a degree in music in 2016. Leading the women's team, Jim Henry began coaching the women's swim program at Yale in 2012, Fabian's freshman year, and through 2025 led the Yale women to a 108–13 record in dual meets, and a record in the Ivy League of 71–12.

Fabian excelled in freestyle distance events at Yale, with her best times in the 200, 500, 1000, and 1650-yard freestyle. With a strong collegiate career, as a Senior in 2016, Fabian received the Ivy League Career High Point award, and in 2013-15 was First Team All-Ivy. She was a CSCAA First Team Scholar and a recipient of the McLeish Memorial Swimming trophy in 2014, given for high ideals in sports, and loyalty to the university. As an underclassman, she received the Harry Burke Award in 2013, given for outstanding swimming by a Yale underclassman. In her Senior year at Yale, Fabian won the 1650-yard, the one mile event at the Nike Cup Invitational. She placed second in the event at the Ivy League Championships.

After a move to Israel in 2017, Eva earned a master's degree (MA) in Political science from Tel Aviv University in 2021.

=== Coaches ===
One of her early and continuing coaches was Jack Fabian, her father, who coached swimming and diving at Keene State College, and was a National development Coach for the Greenwood Swimming Club. Jack was particularly skilled in training swim athletes in Open Water and distance swimming, and considered one of the more outstanding open water coaches in America. After her move to Israel, her primary coach was Hanan Gilad, a well-known Israeli swim coach also specializing in open water swimming, who played a critical role in Eva's success as an elite international competitor and helped her become a prominent figure in Israeli swimming. Gilad coached the Israeli National Swimming Team at Wingate Institute, as their Open Water Coach. Jim Henry, her coach at Yale, also played a prominent role in her development as a distance swimmer in events up to one mile during her time competing with the Yale women's team.

== Distance competition highlights as an American ==
At the 2009 World Aquatics Championships in Rome, Italy, Fabian placed 10th in the 25-kilometer open water event. At the 2009 Open Water National Championships she won the 5K and came in second in the 10K.

At the July 2010 FINA World Open Water Swimming Championships, Fabian won a gold medal in the 5-kilometer swim in 1:02:00.98 in Lac Saint-Jean, Canada, at 16 years of age. In the 10 km, she was disqualified along with Brazil's Poliana Okimoto for failing to round a turn buoy properly. At the 2010 Pan Pacific Swimming Championships, Fabian won a silver medal behind Christine Jennings in the 10-kilometer open water event.

In June, 2011, she swam in choppy waters, yet was able to place first in the 10-K competition at Fort Lauderdale's USA Swimming Open Water National Championships.

At the 2011 Pan American Games in Guadalajara, Mexico, Fabian placed fourth in the 25-kilometer open water event, only two seconds out of third place. At the 2011 USA Swimming Open Water National Championships she won the gold medal in the 10K in 2:18:31.

In 2013 she won bronze medals at the National Championships in the 10K, and at the FINA World Aquatics Championships in Barcelona, Spain, in the 25K with a time of 5:07:20.4.

In 2014 she won a bronze medal at the 2014 US Open Water National Championships in the 10K, and a silver medal at the 2014 Pan Pacific Swimming Championships in Gold Coast, Queensland, Australia, in the 10K.

She won a gold medal at the 2015 Pan American Games in Toronto, Canada, in the women's marathon 10k in 2:03:17.0. She missed most of the 2016 season due to injury.

After recovering from an injury in 2016 which left her sidelined for several months, she began training with her father Jack at New York's Asphalt Green Unified Aquatics, and represented Fike Swim, a manufacturer of swimming products founded by Jim Fike. In 2016, she considered the demanding 10k open water swim her favorite event, and swam an average of 70–85,000 yards per week, around 48 miles, or 73K meters. The distance would equal that done by Olympic swimmers training for standard distance or sprint events, though swimming in open water can often be more exhausting than a pool due to current, chop, and ocean temperatures.

=== Move to Israel ===
Around the age of 20, Fabian immigrated to Israel, and became an Israeli citizen in late 2017, though she had never been in Israel prior to immigrating. She was attracted to competing in Israel partly due to the rare opportunity to train with their national open water team, as many countries had yet to have a national open water team. She was also attracted to Israel's large and scenic beachfront, and the warmer water in Israel's oceans, allowing her to train year round, an opportunity she lacked with the cold ocean water in her native New Hampshire. At the time, Fabian trained with nine demanding training sessions per week, with an average minimum distance of 7 km or 4.3 miles per session. She has lived and trained at Wingate Institute in Netanya and swam with the Israeli National Team. In December 2017 she won a silver medal at the Israel National Short Course Swimming Championships in the 400 m freestyle, with a time of 4:15.74. She represented Israel at the 2019 World Aquatics Championships in Gwangju, South Korea.

In August 2024, at the age of 31, Fabian retired from competitive swimming.

== Personal life ==
As of 2017, Fabian lived in Netanya, Israel. She is an amateur expert violinist, who started to play at age 4, and also plays piano. She worked for Israeli hi-tech companies in her early post-swimming career. In 2022 she married Zohar Tavor, the captain of Israel's national female rugby team.
