= 2010 FINA World Open Water Swimming Championships – Women's 25K =

The Women's 25K race at the 2010 FINA World Open Water Swimming Championships was swum on Thursday, July 22, 2010, in Roberval, Quebec, Canada.

The race began at 9:15 a.m., and was swum in the Lac Saint-Jean in the city centre. 14 women swam the event.

The 25 kilometre distance of the race was reached by completed 10 laps of the 2.5-kilometre course set up for the championships.

== Results ==
All times in hours:minutes:seconds

Place	Swimmer	Country	Time	Notes
1	Linsy Heister	Netherlands	5:52:13.06	
2	Margarita Dominguez Cabezas	Spain	5:55:59.29	
3	Celia Barrot	France	5:57:02.87	
4	Haley Anderson	USA	6:00:15.23	
5	Anna Uvarova	Russia	6:00:21.89	
6	Emily Hanson	USA	6:03:15.75	
7	Kseniya Popova	Russia	6:06:25.02	
8	Joannie Guillemette Simard	Canada	6:23:05.36	
9	Antonella Bogarin	Argentina	6:41:51.11	
–	Ivana Sitic	Croatia	OTL	
–	Lara Rodriguez Anido	Argentina	OTL	
–	Martina Grimaldi	Italy	DSQ	
–	Federica Vitale	Italy	DNF	
–	Stacey Hansford	Australia	DNF	
