= Pathunyu Yimsomruay =

Thai swimmer (born 1979)

Personal information
- Full name: Pathunyu Yimsomruay
- Nickname: Guy
- National team: Thailand
- Born: 6 July 1979 (age 47) Bangkok, Thailand
- Height: 1.75 m (5 ft 9 in)
- Weight: 68 kg (150 lb)

Sport
- Sport: Swimming
- Strokes: Backstroke, medley
- College team: University of Virginia (U.S.)
- Coach: Mark Bernardino (University of Virginia); Dick Shoulberg (Germantown Academy)
Medal record
Men's swimming
Representing Thailand
Southeast Asian Games
Gold medal – first place	2003 Hanoi	4×100 m medley
Silver medal – second place	1999 Brunei	200 m medley
Bronze medal – third place	2001 Kuala Lumpur	200 m medley
Bronze medal – third place	2001 Kuala Lumpur	400 m medley

Pathunyu "Guy" Yimsomruay (born July 6, 1979) is a Thai former swimmer, who specialized in backstroke and in individual medley events. He swam for Thailand in the 2000 Sydney Olympics, but did not make it to the finals. He excelled, however, as a four-time medalist at the Southeast Asian Games in 1997, 1999, 2001, and 2003. While studying in the United States, Yimsomruay earned four All-American and five All-ACC honors for the Virginia Cavaliers.

== Early years ==
Yimsomruay was born in Bangkok, Thailand, on July 6, 1979, the son of Sayan, a Bangkok advertising executive, and Sumalee Yimsomruay. He started his sporting career at an early age, as a member of Bangkok's Singha Swimming Club. At Singha, by late Junior High, he regularly practiced four hours a day, five days a week. He accepted a full scholarship to study at the Germantown Academy in Fort Washington, Pennsylvania, which was provided by the sponsors of the Singha Swimming Club. At Germantown Academy, he was coached by Hall of Fame Coach Dick Shoulberg who helped improve his technique and was known for getting the most out of his more talented swimmers. Coach Shoulberg first took note of Yimsomruay at Thailand's National Youth Games in Thailand in 1994.

== Germantown Academy era ==
At Germantown Academy, Yimsomruay increased his practice times from four hours a day weekdays to six hours a day six days a week under the demanding training regiment of Dick Shoulberg. By his Junior year in High School in December 1997, he had swum the 400-meter IM in 4:30.8 and the 200-meter IM in 2:06.7, which gave him Senior National Status in the two events. During his high school career, he set Germantown Academy records in the 100-yard butterfly (50.65) and 100-yard backstroke (50.40), and received all-league and all-section honors.

== University of Virginia ==
In 1999, Yimsomruay attended the University of Virginia in Charlottesville, where he majored in sociology, and swam for the Virginia Cavaliers, swimming and diving team under head coach Mark Bernardino. While swimming for the Cavaliers, he received four All-American and five All-ACC honors, and eventually helped the school's team claim a 200-yard freestyle relay title at the 2002 Atlantic Coast Conference Championships.

== 2000 Sydney Olympics ==
Yimsomruay competed for Thailand in the men's 200 m individual medley at the 2000 Summer Olympics in Sydney. After winning his first gold medal at the SEA Games in Brunei, his entry time of 2:04.90 was officially accredited under a FINA B-standard. He challenged seven other swimmers in heat four of the 2000 Olympics, including Latvia's two-time Olympian and top favorite Valērijs Kalmikovs. He closed out the field to last place by 4.31 seconds behind winner Dean Kent of New Zealand. Yimsomruay failed to advance into the semifinals, as he placed forty-third overall in heat four with a time of 2:08.38.

== Southeast Asian Games ==
Yimsomruay excelled in Southeast Asian Games competitions, bringing greater recognition to Thai swimmers. At the age of 18, in one of the high points of his early swimming career he took a second place silver medal with a 4:30.8 in the 400-meter IM in the Southeast Asian Games in Indonesia in October 1997. Yimsomruay also competed for the national team when Thailand hosted the 1998 Asian Games, but failed to collect a medal in his signature events, the 200-meter backstroke or the 200-meter individual medley.

At the 2001 Southeast Asian Games in Kuala Lumpur, Malaysia, Yimsomruay won two bronze medals one in the 200 m individual medley (2:07.38), and in the 400 m individual medley (4:32.29).

In the 1999 and 2003 Asian Games, benefitting from demanding training and quality coaching, he won a gold medal in the 200-meter medley in 1999 in Brunei, and another gold medal in the 4x100-meter relay in 2003 in Hanoi.
