= 2010 FINA World Open Water Swimming Championships =

Swimming competition in Quebec, Canada

The 6th FINA World Open Water Swimming Championships was being held July 15–23, 2010 in Lac Saint-Jean near Roberval, Quebec, Canada.

The championships featured 3 race distances: 5-kilometre (5K), 10-kilometre (10K) and 25-kilometre (25K). Schedule for the championships was:

- Saturday, July 17: Women's 10K (11:30 a.m.)
- Sunday, July 18: Men's 10K (11:30 a.m.)
- Tuesday, July 20: Women's 5K (10:30 a.m.), Men's 5K (2:00 p.m.)
- Thursday, July 22: Women's 25K (9:15 a.m. start), Men's 25K (9:00 a.m. start)

The 2010 edition of the Open Water Worlds were the last stand-alone "open" (meaning no age limit) championships, and a Junior Open Water Worlds is to be created in its place. However, the Open Water events will remain in the biennial World Championships. This change brings the open water discipline closer to matching FINA's other disciplines in championships structuring.

== Participating countries ==
On 14 June 2010, the event organizers announced that 144 athletes from 30 countries have entered the championships. Countries entered are:

- Argentina (4)
- Australia (7)
- Azerbaijan (3)
- Belgium (3)
- Brazil (5)
- Bulgaria (1)
- Canada (7)
- China (3)
- Croatia (4)
- Czech Republic (5)
- Ecuador (3)
- France (8)
- Germany (5)
- Great Britain (4)
- Greece (3)
- Israel (1)
- Italy (8)
- Mexico (5)
- Netherlands (1)
- New Zealand (1)
- Poland (1)
- Russia (10)
- Slovakia (2)
- Slovenia (1)
- South Africa (2)
- Spain (5)
- Syria^{*}
- Ukraine (3)
- United Arab Emirates^{*}
- USA (8)

^{*}Syria and the UAE are both listed in the overview of teams attending; however, neither have entries on the athlete roster for the Championships.

== Results ==
Event	Gold		Silver		Bronze	
Women's 5K details	Eva Fabian (United States) USA	1:02:00.9	Giorgia Consiglio; Italy	1:02:01.0	Ana Marcela Cunha; Brazil	1:02:02.6
Men's 5K details	Thomas Lurz; Germany	57:42.6	Evgeny Drattsev; Russia	57:44.1	Fran Crippen (United States) USA	57:46.5
Women's 10K details	Martina Grimaldi; Italy	2:05:45.2	Giorgia Consiglio; Italy	2:05:57.4	Melissa Gorman; Australia	2:05:57.9
Men's 10K details	Valerio Cleri; Italy	2:00:59.3	Evgeny Drattsev; Russia	2:01:00.6	Vladimir Dyatchin; Russia	2:01:03.0
Women's 25K details	Linsy Heister; Netherlands	5:52:13.06	Margarita Dominguez; Spain	5:55:59.29	Celia Barrot; France	5:57:02.87
Men's 25K details	Alex Meyer (United States) USA	5:32:39.38	Valerio Cleri; Italy	5:32:40.40	Petar Stoychev; Bulgaria	5:33:50.29

== Overall standings ==
=== Medals ===
Rank	Nation	Gold	Silver	Bronze	Total
1	Italy (ITA)	2	3	0	5
2	United States (USA)	2	0	1	3
3	Germany (GER)	1	0	0	1
3	Netherlands (NED)	1	0	0	1
5	Russia (RUS)	0	2	1	3
6	Spain (ESP)	0	1	0	1
7	Australia (AUS)	0	0	1	1
7	Brazil (BRA)	0	0	1	1
7	Bulgaria (BUL)	0	0	1	1
7	France (FRA)	0	0	1	1
Totals (10 entries)		6	6	6	18

=== Points ===
Overall point standings for the 6th Open Water Worlds are:

Rank	Country	Points Women	Points Men	Total
1	Italy	52	64	116
2	USA	55	56	111
3	Russia	16	46	62
4	France	24	16	40
5	Brazil	33	3	36
5	Germany	10	26	36
7	Australia	14	10	24
8	Spain	21	–	21
8	Netherlands	21	–	21
10	Bulgaria	–	18	18
11	Ukraine	–	17	17
12	Greece	6	10	16
13	Canada	5	8	13
14	China	12	–	12
15	Argentina	4	4	8
16	Czech Republic	–	8	8
17	South Africa	–	6	6
18	Great Britain	5	–	5
18	Slovenia	5	–	5
20	New Zealand	4	–	4
21	Croatia	3	0	3
21	Mexico	1	2	3
23	Azerbaijan	–	2	2
24	Ecuador	–	1	1

== See also ==
- 2008 FINA World Open Water Swimming Championships
