= Sierra Schmidt =

American swimmer (born 1998)

Personal information
- Nationality: United States
- Born: May 6, 1998 (age 28) Scottsdale, Arizona, U.S.
- Height: 5 ft 6 in (1.67 m)
- Weight: 139 lb (63 kg)

Sport
- Sport: Swimming
- Strokes: Freestyle
- Club: Germantown Academy; North Baltimore Aquatic Club
- College team: University of Michigan
- Coach: Dick Shoulberg (Germantown Academy); Mike Bottom (University of Michigan)
Medal record
Women's swimming
Representing the United States
Pan American Games
Gold medal – first place	2015 Toronto	800 m freestyle
Swimming World Cup
Silver medal – second place	2016 Hong Kong	400 m freestyle
Bronze medal – third place	2016 Hong Kong	800 m freestyle
World Junior Championships
Gold medal – first place	2015 Singapore	800 m freestyle
Silver medal – second place	2015 Singapore	400 m freestyle
Silver medal – second place	2015 Singapore	1500 m freestyle
World University Games
Bronze medal – third place	2017 Taipei	400 m freestyle
Bronze medal – third place	2019 Naples	400 m freestyle
Junior Pan Pacific Championships
Gold medal – first place	2014 Maui	800 m freestyle
Gold medal – first place	2014 Maui	1500 m freestyle

Sierra Schmidt (born May 6, 1998) is an American former competition swimmer who swam for the University of Michigan and was a distance freestyle medalist in the 2015 Pan American Games and 2016 World Cup.

== Early life and swimming ==
Schmidt was born to Melinda and Joseph Schmidt in Scottsdale, Arizona.

In Junior High, around 2012–2014, Sierra swam for Hall of Fame Coach Dick Shoulberg while attending Germantown Academy in Fort Washington, Pennsylvania and competed in a number of events including the 1650 free. On February 22–23, 2014, taking a first-place finish with a time of 4:46.29 in the 500 freestyle, she helped lead Germantown Academy to a first-place finish at the Eastern Interscholastic Swimming and Diving Championships at LaSalle University. In 2014, she was named a Catholic League All-Star.

Schmidt graduated from the 21st Century Cyber Charter School in Exton, Pennsylvania in 2017. She was a multiple time junior national champion in 2014 and competed for the North Baltimore Aquatic Club from 2014 to 2016.

== Career ==
Schmidt won a gold medal at the 2015 Pan American Games in the 800 metre freestyle. This performance set a Pan American Games record.

She competed for the University of Michigan and Club Wolverine under Head Coach Mike Bottom from 2017 to 2021 and graduated from the University of Michigan in May 2021, earning a BA in film, Television, and Media, with honors. She was a six-time CSCAA All-American, Big Ten champion in the 800 free relay, as well as a two-time Big-Ten Distinguished Scholar and four-time CSCAA Scholar All-American during her time in Ann Arbor.

Schmidt announced that she signed a sponsorship deal with TYR Sport on June 3, 2021.

Schmidt is known as the “Dancing Queen” for her ritual of dancing behind the starting blocks prior to her races.

Schmidt qualified for the 2016 U.S. Olympic Trials, where she finished 10th in the 400 meter freestyle and 8th in the 800 meter freestyle. At the postponed 2020 U.S. Olympic Trials, June 13–20, 2021, Sierra finished 6th in the 400 meter freestyle, 8th in the 800 meter freestyle, and 7th in the 1500 meter freestyle, one of only three swimmers to qualify for all three distance finals in the arduous Olympic prelim/final schedule. Her best time in the 1500 free from a month prior, 16:06.85, was ranked 19th in the world at that time.

Schmidt announced her retirement on June 29, 2023, following her participation at the 2023 U.S. National Championships in Indianapolis. Schmidt's last event in the competition was the 400 meter freestyle, which took place on June 30, 2023.
