= Open water swimming at the 2009 World Aquatics Championships – Men's 10 km =

Men's 10 km at the 2009 World Aquatics Championships
- Location: Rome
- Dates: 22 July
- Competitors: 48 from 27 nations

The men's 10K (10 kilometer) race at the 2009 World Championships occurred on Wednesday, July 22 at Ostia Beach in Rome, Italy. In total, 48 males from 27 countries were entered in the race.

== Results ==
Rank	Swimmer	Nationality	Time
1st place, gold medalist(s)	Thomas Lurz	Germany	1:52:06.9
2nd place, silver medalist(s)	Andrew Gemmell	USA	1:52:08.3
3rd place, bronze medalist(s)	Fran Crippen	USA	1:52:10.7
4	Valerio Cleri	Italy	1:52:11.4
5	Brian Ryckeman	Belgium	1:52:13.1
6	Spyridon Gianniotis	Greece	1:52:13.6
7	Francisco Jose Hervas	Spain	1:52:14.7
8	Trent Grimsey	Australia	1:52:14.8
9	Mazen Metwaly	Egypt	1:52:14.9
10	Evgeny Drattsev	Russia	1:52:15.0
11	Luis Escobar	Mexico	1:52:18.0
12	Jakub Fitchl	Czech Republic	1:52:24.0
13	Csaba Gercsák	Hungary	1:52:28.0
14	Arseniy Lavrentyev	Portugal	1:52:28.2
15	Diego Nogueira Montero	Spain	1:52:37.1
16	Antonios Fokaidis	Greece	1:52:41.3
17	Daniel Fogg	(United Kingdom) Great Britain	1:52:44.3
18	Sergey Bolshakov	Russia	1:52:44.5
19	Ivan Lopez	Mexico	1:52:45.9
20	Julien Codeville	France	1:52:47.2
21	Rhys Mainstone	Australia	1:52:50.2
22	Allan do Carmo	Brazil	1:52:52.2
23	Chad Ho	South Africa	1:53:13.1
24	Bertrand Venturi	France	1:53:14.5
25	Adel El-Behary	Egypt	1:53:52.1
26	Simon Tobin-Daignault	Canada	1:53:53.9
27	Christian Reichert	Germany	1:54:09.9
28	Michael Dmitriev	Israel	1:54:29.6
29	Petar Stoychev	Bulgaria	1:54:50.8
30	Jan Posmourny	Czech Republic	1:55:17.4
31	Ventsislav Aydarski	Bulgaria	1:55:53.5
32	Simone Ercoli	Italy	1:56:46.3
33	Daniel Viegas	Spain	1:58:21.3
34	Craig Hamilton	(United Kingdom) Great Britain	1:58:55.7
35	Kurt Niehaus	Costa Rica	1:59:25.0
36	Ivan Enderica	Ecuador	1:59:29.4
37	Philippe Dubreuil	Canada	1:59:38.9
38	Marcelo Romanelli Soares	Brazil	2:00:42.2
39	Esteban Enderica	Ecuador	2:01:48.8
40	Josip Soldo	Croatia	2:08:07.2
41	Tomislav Soldo	Croatia	2:12:19.8
42	Juan Prem Biere	Guatemala	2:20:48.2
--	Elgun Babayev	Azerbaijan	DNF
--	Ruslan Bolshakov	Azerbaijan	DNF
--	Angel Moreira	Venezuela	DNF
--	Igor Chervynskiy	Ukraine	DQ
--	Igor Snitko	Ukraine	DQ
--	Yvan Hernandez	Venezuela	DQ

Key: DNF = Did not finish, DQ = Disqualified

== Protest over finish ==
Due to a protest about the race finish, results from the race were delayed a day, until after a meeting on Thursday, July 23, 2009. At issue was the USA's Fran Crippen's finish approach.

On July 23, 2009, it was decided that Crippen's finish approach was legal and he was awarded the bronze medal.

== See also ==
- Open water swimming at the 2007 World Aquatics Championships – Men's 10 km
- Swimming at the 2008 Summer Olympics
