= Trina Radke =

American swimmer (born 1970)

Katrina Radke
- Born: December 17, 1970 (age 55); Morris, Minnesota, U.S.
- Education: {{plainlist|: University of California, Berkeley (B.A.); Southern Connecticut State University (Master's); Yale University School of Medicine (Internship); }}
- Occupations: Swimmer, MFT, author, college professor, television personality
- Employer: Foothill College
- Website: www.katrinaradke.com

Swimming career
Personal information
- National team: USA Swimming
- Height: 5 ft 7 in (1.70 m)
- Weight: 137 lb (62 kg)

Sport
- Sport: Swimming
- Strokes: Butterfly, freestyle
- Club: Germantown Academy Aquatic Club
- College team: University of California
- Coach: Dick Shoulberg (Germantown Academy)
Medal record
Women's swimming
Representing the United States
Pan Pacific Championships
Gold medal – first place	1985 Tokyo	4 × 200 m freestyle
Gold medal – first place	1987 Brisbane	4 × 200 m freestyle

Katrina Diane Radke (born December 17, 1970) is an American former competitive swimmer who represented the United States at the 1988 Summer Olympics in Seoul, South Korea.

== Early life and career ==
Radke was born December 17, 1970. She was raised in Morris, Minnesota. She broke all of the Minnesota Age Group State Records, except breaststroke. In 1982 and 1983, her family lived in Adelaide, Australia, where she swam for the Burnside Southside Swim Club, breaking several State Age Group Records.

At the age of 13 she and her family moved to Emmaus, Pennsylvania. By the time she was 14, she landed a spot on the U.S. National Swim Team, where she was its youngest member.

Radke won gold medals and broke the American and U.S. Open Record at the Pan Pacific Swimming Championships in 1985 and 1987 as part of the 800-meter (4 × 200 m) Freestyle Relay Team.

In 1988, as a member of the U.S. Olympic Swim Team, she finished fifth in the final of the women's 200-meter butterfly event at the Seoul Olympics, recording a time of 2:11.55.

During this time she was also a member of the swim team at her high school, Germantown Academy in Fort Washington, Pennsylvania, where she swam for Hall of Fame Coach Dick Shoulberg. At Germantown Academy, she was a member of a swimming team that won the team national title, and Radke broke two national prep school records.

In 1990, Radke won the U.S. National Title, winning the 200-meter butterfly. Radke won two more international gold medals and broke national records in Italy. She was captain of the USA Swimming in 1991.

== College years ==
Upon graduating from Germantown Academy in 1989, she enrolled at the University of California, Berkeley, where she broke school records and was All American each year, while swimming for their varsity team. During her time in college, she also continued swimming for Team USA, winning two more gold medals along the way, while becoming a national champion swimmer in the 200-meter butterfly at the 1990 U.S. Long-Course Championships, where she competed alongside other swimmers, including Janet Evans. Radke also was a co-captain on Team USA. She graduated Berkeley with a Bachelor's degree in International Business and Ethics, and a Minor in Russian Language, and then earned a Master's degree in Marriage and Family Therapy at Southern Connecticut State University. She completed her internship through Yale University School of Medicine.

== Health issues ==
While still in high school, Radke contracted mononucleosis. Despite this, she continued to compete in swim meets even at the highest level. In 1991, she learned that she had chronic fatigue syndrome, which forced her to sit out the 1992 Olympic trials. Soon, her condition got so bad, that she found herself bedridden and had to use handicapped parking spaces when driving. In 1993, she retired from competitive swimming due to her ongoing bout with CFIDS. After 12 years of battling the disease, she finally felt well enough to attempt a comeback in Olympic swimming. She participated in the 2004 Olympic trials, thus enabling her to re-enter the world rankings after more than a decade of retirement.

In 2012 Radke authored and released a book on her life story, healing from CFIDS, and tools for the reader to maximize their potential and well-being, as they tap into their true selves, entitled Be Your Best Without the Stress.

== Survivor ==
=== Heroes vs. Healers vs. Hustlers ===
On August 30, 2017, it was announced that Radke was one of 18 competitors on Survivor: Heroes v. Healers v. Hustlers, the 35th season of the US version of Survivor. She was part of the Levu (Heroes) tribe. Radke became the first person voted out of Season 35, due to her being the oldest person on that season, according to the editing done by CBS.

== Personal life ==
Radke is married to former Stanford University and Olympic swim coach Ross Gerry. They reside in Excelsior, Minnesota and have two children.

== Later career ==
Radke works as a marriage and family therapist (MFT), and an online professor for Foothill College in Los Altos Hills, California. She and her husband run a motivational coaching and health business in the Twin Cities, called WeCoach4U. In addition, she is a contributing writer to Swim Swam magazine; and in 2016, she was elected president of the newly-formed Minnesota chapter of the United States Olympians and Paralympians Association.

== Bibliography ==
- Be Your Best Without the Stress; Motivational Press, Inc. (2012), ISBN 978-1-9357-2361-5

== See also ==
- List of University of California, Berkeley alumni
