= Open water swimming at the 2014 European Aquatics Championships – Men's 10 km =

Men's 10 km at the Open water swimming at the 2014 European Aquatics Championships
- Dates: 14 August
- Competitors: 39 from 17 nations
- Winning time: 1:49:56.2

Medalists
gold medal	Ferry Weertman	Netherlands
silver medal	Thomas Lurz	Germany
bronze medal	Evgeny Drattsev	Russia

The Men's 10 km competition of the 2014 European Aquatics Championships was held on 14 August.

== Results ==
The race was started at 10:00.

Rank	Swimmer	Nationality	Time
1st place, gold medalist(s)	Ferry Weertman	Netherlands	1:49:56.2
2nd place, silver medalist(s)	Thomas Lurz	Germany	1:49:59.0
3rd place, bronze medalist(s)	Evgeny Drattsev	Russia	1:50:00.6
4	Federico Vanelli	Italy	1:50:02.3
5	Matteo Furlan	Italy	1:50:03.8
6	Jack Burnell	Great Britain	1:50:04.1
7	Kirill Abrosimov	Russia	1:50:05.1
8	Spyridon Gianniotis	Greece	1:50:05.1
9	Axel Reymond	France	1:50:07.6
10	Gergely Gyurta	Hungary	1:50:08.0
11	Christian Reichert	Germany	1:50:09.4
12	Antonios Fokaidis	Greece	1:50:10.1
13	Romain Beraud	France	1:50:11.6
14	Thomas Allen	Great Britain	1:50:12.5
15	Simone Ruffini	Italy	1:50:12.8
16	Christopher Bryan	Ireland	1:50:13.4
17	Márk Papp	Hungary	1:50:14.3
18	Marcel Schouten	Netherlands	1:50:14.6
19	Ihor Chervynskyi	Ukraine	1:50:14.6
20	Andreas Waschburger	Germany	1:50:39.9
21	Ihor Snitko	Ukraine	1:50:40.1
22	Ventsislav Aydarski	Bulgaria	1:50:44.9
23	Mateusz Sawrymowicz	Poland	1:50:45.9
24	Caleb Hughes	Great Britain	1:50:56.7
25	Volodymyr Voronko	Ukraine	1:51:55.9
26	Patrik Rakos	Hungary	1:52:01.2
27	Matthias Schweinzer	Austria	1:52:02.5
28	Damien Cattin-Vidal	France	1:52:12.1
29	Daniil Serebrennikov	Russia	1:52:12.3
30	Shahar Resman	Israel	1:52:16.0
31	Jan Urbaniak	Poland	1:53:25.0
32	Vasco Gaspar	Portugal	1:53:32.7
33	Yuval Safra	Israel	1:53:51.8
34	Karel Baloun	Czech Republic	1:53:57.8
35	Vit Ingeduld	Czech Republic	1:58:32.8
36	Georgios Arniakos	Greece	1:58:59.1
37	Antonio Arroyo	Spain	2:02:59.7
—	Thomas Liess	Switzerland	DNF
—	Jan Kutnik	Czech Republic	DNF
