= Trent Grimsey =

Australian swimmer

Personal information
- National team: Australia
- Born: 4 May 1988 (age 38)

Sport
- Sport: Swimming
- Strokes: Freestyle, open water
Medal record
Men's swimming
Representing Australia
World Aquatics Championships
Silver medal – second place	2009 Rome	25 km

Trent Grimsey (born 4 May 1988) is an Australian retired long distance swimmer who set a new record time for crossing the English Channel in 2012. He won the silver medal in the 25 kilometre open water at the 2009 World Aquatics Championships in Rome. He also finished 8th in the 10 km event. Two years later he finished fifth in the 25 km at the 2011 World Aquatics Championships in Shanghai.

On 8 September 2012, Grimsey became the world record holder for the fastest crossing of the English Channel with a time of 6 hours and 55 minutes, breaking the previous record held by Bulgarian Petar Stoychev by 2 minutes.

Grimsey participated in several freestyle events in the pool at the 2006 Pan Pacific Swimming Championships in Victoria, British Columbia, Canada. In 2008 he missed Olympic qualification in the 1500 metre by finishing third at the Australian trials in Sydney.
