= Bill Rose (swim coach) =

American swimming coach

Biographical details
- Born: 1943 (age 82–83); Long Beach, California
- Education: University of the Pacific

Playing career
- 1960–1964: University of the Pacific; Coach Chris Kjeldsen
- Positions: Breaststroke, Individual Medley

Coaching career (HC unless noted)
- 1967–1968: San Joaquin Delta College
- 1968–1974: University of the Pacific; Stockton, California
- 1971–1974: Pacific Aquatic Club; Stockton, CA
- 1974–1976: DeAnza Swim Club
- 1976–1979: Canadian Dolphin Team; Vancouver, Canada
- 1979–1981: Arizona State University; Women's Team
- 1982–1992: Dean Witter & Prudential Bache (Vice-President, Stockbroker)
- 1992–2017: Mission Viejo Nadadores

Accomplishments and honors

Championships
- 2 PCAA Conf. Championships (U of Pacific)

Awards
- ASCA Swimming Hall of Fame, 2004; 2006, 2008 Developmental Coach of the Year (U.S. Olympic Committee); Southern California Coach of the Year

Robert William "Bill" Rose Jr. is an American club and collegiate swimming coach best known for coaching the Mission Viejo Nadadores from 1992–2017. He served on the coaching staff for the U.S. national team at the World University Games in 1997 and 1999, was on the U.S. Olympic coaching staff in 2008, and has served as the Head Olympic coach for Mexico. During his career of over 45 years, he coached 6 U.S. Olympic participants, including three Olympic medalists, Mike Bruner, Larsen Jensen and Tom Shields.

== Early life ==
Rose was born in 1943 in Long Beach, California to Mr. and Mrs. Robert Rose, and attended Wilson High School in the Moore-Coast High School Swimming League, where he excelled as a swimmer. Swimming for the Dolphins Swim Club under Coach Jerry LaBonte, he was on a 14–15 age group team that recorded a time of 2:16.8 in the 200-yard medley relay in late August that broke the existing AAU age-group national record by two seconds. The record time, though unofficial as it did not occur at a sanctioned AAU meet, occurred during a practice at the Mayfair Pool in Lakewood, California in preparation for 1957 AAU Junior Olympic Championship swimming meet later held on September 6–7.

In June 1959 at the age of 16, while helping to win the Pacific Southwest Swimming and Diving Championship for the Long Beach YMCA team under Coach Jerry LaBonte in Sacramento, Rose was part of a 200-yard medley relay team that broke the national AAU medley relay record by four seconds with an unofficial combined time of 1:50.8. During his High School years in 1957–58, Rose was elected as Vice-President and later President of the Starlighters, the large teenage social organization for the junior members of the Pacific Coast Club of Long Beach, which hosted social events including dances. The club at one time featured an Olympic sized swimming pool and hosted a swim team. Rose set a new meet record swimming for Wilson High School in the 100-yard breaststroke of 1:37.5 at the Moore League Invitational tournament in March, 1959.

== Swimming for the Pacific Tigers ==
Rose swam for the University of the Pacific Tigers in Stockton, California under Coach Chris Kjeldsen from 1960–1964, specializing in the breaststroke, medley relay, and individual medley. He also played water polo, serving as Captain in his Senior Year, when the team was rated first in the nation among small colleges. In his Freshman year, he swam the breaststroke leg for a 400 Medley Relay team that set a Tigers's school record with a combined time of 4:07.3. As a sophomore, and a leading goal scorer, he was chosen as the Most Valuable Player for the Tigers's Water Polo team, and played first base for the school's baseball team his Junior year. Rose was later known for injecting team spirit and unity as a swim coach, and was elected Yell Leader by the Pacific Student Association in May, 1961, also serving as a cheerleader.

Rose planned to wed Christine Ann Parker in the summer of 1965, a year after college graduation. He pursued advanced studies in physical education and business administration after graduating the University of the Pacific in 1964.

== Coaching ==
In April, 1967, Rose coached the San Joaquin Delta Junior College to a third place in the Valley Conference swim standings. In 1968, while coaching at Delta College, he led the team to the State Junior College Championships in May where they set nine school records. Aware of the need for serious distance training, Rose had his team swim 6000 yards in workouts in preparation for the State Meet before tapering their practices. Several of his swimmers captured National Junior College All American swimming team status at the state meet.

=== University of the Pacific ===
He started his first major collegiate swim assignment career at the University of the Pacific, Stockton where he led the team to two Pacific Coast Athletic Association (PCAA) Conference Championships during his coaching tenure from 1968–1974. Rose also taught Water Polo while at the University of the Pacific. During his tenure as Coach, in July, 1970, the University announced the construction of a new Olympic sized competition pool, which was planned to be completed by June, 1971.

Rose excelled in expanding club membership, and improving team performance in competitions. From 1971–1974, while coaching the Pacific Aquatic Club in Stockton, California, and simultaneously coaching at the University of the Pacific, Rose grew the Pacific Club from 37 to 235 members. Among his swimmers at the Pacific Athletic Club in the summer of 1973 was future Olympic Medalist Mike Bruner.

=== DeAnza swim club ===
As the coach for the DeAnza Swim Club in DeAnza, California from 1974–1976, he doubled the club's size from 320 to 627 and went from being unable to score in national meets to a fourth place finish in 1976. Three of his swimmers at DeAnza swam for the Taiwan Swim Team at the Olympics, and Rose was selected as Taiwan's Head Swim Coach at the 1976 Montreal Olympics. Canadian authorities refused to allow the Taiwanese team to swim under the name Republic of China, as the People's Republic of China did not recognize the Republic of China as the official name of Taiwan and Canada had previously recognized the People's Republic of China, in Mainland, China. The Taiwanese government would not fly a different flag identifying them as Taiwan or take a different name, and decided not to compete. His most outstanding swimmer at DeAnza Club, was Mike Bruner, a gold medal winner in the 200-meter butterfly at the 1976 Montreal Olympics. Rose helped Bruner prepare for the 1976 Olympics, when Bruner temporarily left Stanford to train at DeAnza in December, 1975. In the summer of 1976, the DeAnza team placed fifth among American teams at the National Long Course Championships.

=== Dolphin swim club ===
Rose coached the Canadian Dolphin Swim Club of Vancouver from 1976–1979, replacing Coach Deryk Snelling. While attending the 1976 Montreal Olympics, Rose had noted the quality of the Canadian team, and that many of their swimmers were from Vancouver. The Dolphins had the most successful age group program in Vancouver with a membership of around 150 at the time, though Rose grew the club significantly during his tenure. The Dolphins also had the luxury of a heated indoor pool to accommodate year round training, the first indoor pool at which Rose had coached. Rose expected swimmers Karen Reeser, a world class swimmer, and Joan Chessley to follow him to the Dolphin club. World ranked individual medley swimmers Mike Saphir and Kevin Drake also followed Rose to the Dolphin team.

In one of his last collegiate coaching stints, Rose coached the Arizona State Women's swim team from 1979–1981, leading the team to top 5 national rankings in 1980 and 1981. In 1980–81, one of Rose's outstanding swimmers at Arizona State in was Anne Gagnon, an NCAA swimming champion in both the 100 and 200-meter breaststroke, who had also trained with Rose in Vancouver, BC. He also coached Nancy Garapick, a 1975 World Record holder.

Rose's wife Siga was considered one of swimming's top age group coaches during her career. She founded Manhattan Beach's Surfside Swim Club, has coached at Lakewood Aquatics with Jim Montrella, and the Golden West and Beach Swim Club in Huntington Beach with Coach John Urbanchek. Siga served as an age group coach for the Mission Bay Nadadores from 1981–1986.

=== Mission Viejo Nadadores ===
In August, 1992, the Mission Viejo Nadadores announced that Rose would take over as head coach after the resignation of Coach Terry Stoddard. One of the America's largest and most successful age-group programs, the Nadadores have had at least one of their swimmers at every Olympics from 1976 through 2000. Rose's wife Siga returned as an Assistant Coach for the Nadadores in 1992 as well.

At the age of 73, Rose retired from his coaching duties with the Nadadores in December 2017, with his wife Siga retiring as well.

=== International coaching ===
Coach Rose served as the Coach for the U.S. National Team in Bremen, Germany, and as Head Coach of the Canadian Pan-American Women's Team, the World Championship Team of Canada, and the Commonwealth Team of Canada.

Rose coached the U.S. swim team at the 1995 Pan American Games in Mar Del Plata, Argentina. In August, 1997, he was part of the staff of the U.S. World University Games Team in Sicily, Italy. Rose served as the Head Women's Coach for the 1999 World University Games team that competed in Palma de Mallorca, Spain. Coach Rose helped put Chad Carvin on the 2000 US Olympic team and six swimmers from other nations. In 2000, he served as the Head Olympic Coach for Mexico after coaching so many of their swimmers to the Olympic games.

=== Long distance coach ===
Rose specialized in coaching long distance swimmers, and was named to the staff of the August, 2006 U.S.A. World University Games in Turkey, where his swimmer Justin Mortimer, captured a Gold Medal in the 1500 meter freestyle, a distance approximating the mile. Rose served as the Head Coach for the U.S.A. Open Water Team in 2007 at the Melbourne, Australia World Championships. Coach Rose was named to the USA Olympic Team Coaching staff in 2008, and became the Head Coach for the first Olympic swim of the 10 kilometer distance. Chloe Sutton, one of his swimmers, was the first American woman to compete in this Olympic event, though she did not place in medal contention. Rose chaired the Open Water Steering and Open Water Swimming committees for USA Swimming.

== Notable swimmers ==
Rose coached multiple Olympians, including 2004 Olympic silver medalist Larsen Jensen, 2000 Olympian Chad Carvin, 2008 and 2012 Olympic participant Chloe Sutton Mackey, 2016 and 2020 Olympic gold medalist Tom Shields, and 2020 Olympic participant Ashley Twichell. He coached the late distance swimmer Fran Crippen, who swam with Rose and the Nadadores from 2006–2008. He also coached Grant Shoults, a 2017 World University Games medalist.

== Honors ==
Rose was made a member of the American Swimming Coaches Hall of Fame by his peers in 2004. He was inducted into the University of the Pacific Hall of Fame in 1989. Nearing the end of his coaching years, Rose was Southern California Swimming (SCS) Coach of the Year in both 2013 and 2014.
