= 2010 FINA World Open Water Swimming Championships – Men's 25K =

The Men's 25K race at the 2010 FINA World Open Water Swimming Championships was swum on Thursday, July 22, 2010 in Roberval, Quebec, Canada.

The race began at 9 a.m., and was swum in the Lac Saint-Jean in the city centre. 21 men swam the event.

The 25 kilometre distance of the race was reached by completed 10 laps of the 2.5-kilometre course set up for the championships.

== Results ==
All times in hours:minutes:seconds

Place	Swimmer	Country	Time	Notes
1	Alex Meyer	USA	5:32:39.38	
2	Valerio Cleri	Italy	5:32:40.40	
3	Petar Stoychev	Bulgaria	5:33:50.29	
4	Edoardo Stochino	Italy	5:35:08.46	
5	Bertrand Venturi	France	5:36:10.75	
6	Simon Tobin	Canada	5:37:09.74	
7	Josef Kinderwater	USA	5:37:32.67	
8	Joanes Hedel	France	5:37:48.38	
9	Damián Blaum	Argentina	5:39:27.33	
10	Libor Smolka	Czech Republic	5:39:31.30	
11	David Browne	Australia	5:39:52.44	
12	Rostislav Vitek	Czech Republic	5:42:24.45	
13	Xavier Desharnais	Canada	5:51:48.45	
14	Josip Soldo	Croatia	5:59:43.05	
15	Evgenij Popacev	Macedonia	6:03:01.01	
16	Ivan Afanevich	Russia	6:13:18.56	
17	Michal Skrodzki	Poland	6:18:25.99	
–	Raul Alberto Macedo	Argentina	DNF	
–	Vasily Boykov	Russia	DNF	
–	Tomislav Soldo	Croatia	DNF	
–	Sergiy Fesenko	Azerbaijan	DNS	
