= Mazen Metwaly =

Egyptian swimmer

Personal information
- Full name: Mazen Muhammad Aziz Metwaly
- Nationality: Egyptian
- Born: March 14, 1990 (age 36) Jeddah
- Height: 182 cm (6 ft 0 in)
- Weight: 80 kg (176 lb)

Sport
- Sport: Swimming
- Club: Southern Illinois Salukis, Carbondale (USA)

Mazen Mohamed Aziz Metwaly (Arabic: مازن متولي; born 14 March 1990) is an Egyptian professional swimmer, specialising in open water swimming.

At the 2007 Open Water Swimming World Cup, he won a bronze medal. In 2008, he winning the event at Lac Saint-Jean. That year he also won one silver and one bronze medal and finished third overall in the World Cup.

Mazen Aziz won the Dakar-Gorée crossing at the 2006 African Swimming Championships in Dakar. At these championships, he also won a bronze medal in the 4 × 200 m freestyle.

At the 2008 African Swimming Championships in Johannesburg, he won a silver medal in the 5 km open water race.

He finished ninth in the 10 km open water swimming event at the 2009 World Aquatics Championships in Rome.

He competed at the 2012 Summer Olympics.
