= Fran Crippen =

American swimmer (1984–2010)

Personal information
- Full name: Francis Crippen
- National team: United States
- Born: April 17, 1984 Bryn Mawr, Pennsylvania, U.S.
- Died: October 23, 2010 (aged 26) Fujairah, United Arab Emirates
- Height: 6 ft 2 in (188 cm)

Sport
- Sport: Swimming
- Strokes: Freestyle
- Club: Mission Viejo Nadadores (MVN 2006-2008)
- College team: University of Virginia
- Coach: Dick Shoulberg (Germantown Acad.); Bill Rose (Mission Viejo Nad.)
Medal record
Men's swimming
Representing the United States
World Championships
| Bronze medal – third place | 2009 Rome | 10 km open water |
World Open Water Championships
| Bronze medal – third place | 2010 Roberval | 5 km open water |
Pan Pacific Championships
| Silver medal – second place | 2006 Victoria | 10 km open water |
| Silver medal – second place | 2010 Irvine | 10 km open water |
Pan American Games
| Gold medal – first place | 2007 Rio | 10 km open water |
| Silver medal – second place | 2003 Santo Domingo | 400 m freestyle |
| Silver medal – second place | 2003 Santo Domingo | 1500 m freestyle |

Francis Crippen (April 17, 1984 – October 23, 2010) was an American long-distance swimmer. After being a pool swimmer for most of his career, Crippen made the transition to open water swimming in 2006. In international competitions, Crippen won seven medals, five of which were in the open water and two in the pool. Crippen died during an open water swimming race in the United Arab Emirates in 2010 at the age of 26.

== Early life ==
Crippen was born in Bryn Mawr, Pennsylvania, in 1984 to Pete and Pat Crippen. Crippen started swimming at the age of six because of his sister Maddy, as she and his other two sisters are all also competitive swimmers. Maddy was a 2000 Olympian in the 400 individual medley and swam for Villanova University. His sister Claire is an NCAA All-American and Olympic Trials qualifier who swam for the University of Virginia. Teresa Crippen is a Pan-American Games Champion in the 200 meter backstroke and U.S. national team member.

=== Germantown Academy ===
He graduated from Germantown Academy in Fort Washington, Pennsylvania, in 2002 where he swam for Head Coach Dick Shoulberg, who by 1990 had coached four Olympic swimmers. By his senior year just prior to his 18th birthday, Crippen was one of the top 500-yard and 200-yard freestyle swimmers in Germantown's history and one of the top 500-yard freestylers in the country. In 1999, Crippen was selected for the U.S. Junior National Team.

== Swimming career ==
Crippen swam for the University of Virginia, where he was an 11-time All-American and two-time Atlantic Coast Conference (ACC) swimmer of the year. Crippen received MVP awards in 2003-4, a rookie of the year award in 2003, a hardest worker award in 2006 as well as a Coaches award and a Ramirez family leadership award from the University of Virginia. His sister Claire received the MVP award swimming for Virginia in 2008. He graduated from the University of Virginia in 2006 where he majored in sociology. During Crippen's time at UVA, he was a member of the IMP Society, one of the University's secret societies.

He earned a bronze medal as a member of USA Swimming at the 2001 Goodwill Games in Brisbane, Australia. At the 2003 Pan American Games, in Santo Domingo, Dominican Republic, he won two individual silver medals in the 400 and 1500 m freestyle. Crippen represented the United States at the Pan Pacific Championships in 2006, where he earned a silver medal in the 10 km open water swim. From 2006 to 2008 Crippen trained with the Mission Viejo Nadadores in California and swam for coach Bill Rose, who specialized in training distance swimmers. In 2007, he earned a gold medal in the 10 km distance event at the Pan American Games in Rio de Janeiro, Brazil. Two years later, Crippen won a bronze medal in the 10 km open water race at the 2009 World Aquatics Championships. A year later, Crippen again won silver in the 10 km at the 2010 Pan Pacific Swimming Championships in Irvine, California.

Crippen was a six-time US National Champion. He won two national titles in the 800 m freestyle, two in the 5 km open water, and two in the 10 km open water event.

During his swimming career, Crippen represented TYR Sports and Swimming, Inc.

== Death ==
Crippen died while swimming the last race of FINA's 2010 10K series in Fujairah, United Arab Emirates after having won the penultimate race in Cancun, Mexico the weekend before. Crippen's absence at the finish was reportedly first noticed by fellow USA swimmer Alex Meyer. After searching for Crippen and not finding him, Meyer and other swimmers returned to the water to try to locate Crippen. Two hours after the finish of the men's race, and after 90 minutes of searching by other swimmers, Crippen's body was found underwater by deep-sea divers near the race course's final buoy about 500 yards from shore. Crippen was rushed to the local hospital, where he was pronounced dead, though it was suspected he died at the scene.

Winner Thomas Lurz and other swimmers cited the water as being overly warm—above 30 °C (86 °F) during the race—and several other swimmers experienced heat-related symptoms upon completing the race, including two Americans and one Brazilian (Allan do Carmo) who were briefly hospitalized.

FINA president Dr. Julio Maglione said it was the first death in any FINA event and an investigation was opened. Crippen had told his coach after 8 kilometers that he was feeling thirsty, yet continued with the race. A report released by FINA following Crippen's death called for an update in open water swimming safety regulations. The report concluded that Crippen may have died of a "cardiac abnormality" and "uncontrolled exercise-induced asthma in unfavourable race environmental conditions".

== Changing the open water scene ==
Following Crippen's death, members of the swimming community and overall Olympic community were outraged with the lack of regulations at the site where Crippen drowned. The former vice president of the International Olympic Committee, Dick Pound, headed a separate investigation through USA Swimming due to the lack of compliance from the international governing body, World Aquatics. According to USA Today, Crippen's former coach Dick Shoulburg of Germantown Academy, and the Crippen family brought pressure on World Aquatics to adopt better safety regulations.

In USA Swimming, changes were made for the well-being of the athletes. Organizers of an open water swim in Fort Myers have reconsidered the timing of their race because it may exceed the recommended water temperature of 87.8 °F (31.0 °C), or the combined air and water temperature of 145.4 °F (63.0 °C).

United States Masters Swimming (USMS) adopted a warm water conditions rule to the USMS Open Water Rule 302.2.2 (3) A swim of 5 kilometers or greater shall not begin if the water temperature exceeds 85°F (29.45°C). A swim of less than 5 kilometers shall not begin if the water temperature exceeds 87.8°F (31°C).

== See also ==
- List of University of Virginia people
