= Alex Meyer (swimmer) =

American swimmer, Olympic athlete, world champion

Personal information
- Full name: Alexander Meyer
- Nickname: "Alex"
- National team: United States
- Born: July 5, 1988 (age 38) Rochester, Minnesota, U.S.
- Height: 5 ft 10 in (178 cm)
- Weight: 165 lb (75 kg)

Sport
- Sport: Swimming
- Strokes: Freestyle
- Club: Crimson Aquatics
- College team: Harvard University
Medal record
Men's swimming
Representing the United States
World Championships
Silver medal – second place	2015 Kazan	25 km
World Open Water Championships
Gold medal – first place	2010 Roberval	25 km open water

Alexander Meyer (born July 5, 1988) is a former American competition swimmer who specialized in open water and long-distance swimming. He won a gold medal at the 2010 FINA World Open Water Swimming Championships in the 25-kilometer open water event. He was a member of the 2012 United States Olympic team, and placed tenth in the 10-kilometer open water event at the 2012 Summer Olympics. Alex won his final race before retirement, the 62nd Traversée internationale du lac St-Jean held on July 30, 2016.

== Early years ==
Meyer was born in Rochester, Minnesota. He has always been around the water ever since he was a baby, and started swimming competitively when he was 7 years old in Glens Falls, New York. Meyer and his family then moved to Ithaca, New York when he was 11. In Ithaca, Meyer swam for Ithaca Aquatics Club and joined the high school varsity team as a seventh grader. In high school, he was a four-time All-American swimmer and a two-time academic All-American. He won back-to-back New York state championships during his junior and senior years.

== College career ==
Meyer attended Harvard University, where he majored in human evolutionary biology. At Harvard, he swam for the Harvard Crimson swimming team, and was a two-time All-Ivy League selection. He made two appearances at the NCAA Division I Championships. His second year, Meyer qualified for and competed in the 2008 U.S. Olympic Team Trials, in both the 400-meter and 1,500-meter freestyle events. At the 2009 World Aquatics Championships, he was disqualified in the 25-kilometer event. As a senior, Meyer was the Harvard men's team co-captain where he earned All-America honors with a 14th-place finish at the NCAA Division I Championships. That year, he also received the Harold S. Ulen Award as the career high-point swimmer, and the Phil Moriarty Award as the high-point swimmer at the Ivy League Championships.

== International career ==
After graduation from Harvard, Meyer stayed in the Boston area and trained with Crimson Aquatics under Harvard men's swimming head coach Kevin Tyrrell. The summer after graduation, he won his first international gold medal at the 2010 FINA World Open Water Swimming Championships in the 25 km. The following year, Meyer competed in the Open Water Grand Prix and World Cup events. In June 2011, he won gold again in the 10K U.S. Open Water Championships, giving him a bid to the 2011 10K Open Water World Championships in Shanghai, China. Meyer placed fourth in Shanghai, making him the first swimmer to qualify for the 2012 U.S. Olympic Team. 2016 winner of the prestigious and difficult "Traversée du Lac St.Jean" (Lac St. Jean) 32 km Fina Grand Prix race in Lac St. Jean in Roberval, Quebec Canada on his first ever participation with a time of 6h28m01s.

== Personal ==
Meyer's parents were both swimmers. His father, Steve, was a swimmer and diver at Hobart and William Smith Colleges and his mother, Shawn, swam for the University of Georgia. He has one brother, Sam, who is a hockey player. Meyer is a fan of many different kinds of music, his favorites are jazz and blues. When he's not swimming, he enjoys playing the guitar and spending time outside, especially camping and boating with family and friends.

Meyer considers the most influential person in his open water career to be Fran Crippen. Crippen was a seasoned veteran in the sport when Meyer first made the U.S. Team, and the two became roommates when traveling and Crippen took him under his wing. Crippen died while they were both competing in an event in the United Arab Emirates. Meyer uses Crippen's memory as inspiration in training and competition. Recently when asked about being the only men's open water swimmer to qualify for the U.S. Olympic Team, Meyer replied, "I like [U.S. teammate] Sean Ryan a lot, and I was hoping he would make the team with me. He's such a great swimmer and a great person. But then after some time passed, I realized that spot had to be unfilled, because that is Fran Crippen's spot. That is something Fran and I talked about a lot. We dreamed of it together, being Olympic teammates in London. So no offense to Sean or anyone else, but I'm not going to London alone. Fran's going with me, and we're going to represent our country, our schools, our family and friends, and we are going to give it our best."

At the 2012 Summer Olympics in London, Meyer placed tenth in the 10-kilometer marathon event with a time of 1:50:48.2, 53 seconds behind winner Oussama Mellouli over the 6.2-mile distance.

== Awards and results ==
- 2011 Golden Goggle Award – Breakout Swimmer of the Year

2012 London Olympics

- Open Water 10K, 10th

Open Water World Championships

- 2010 – 25 K, Gold Medalist
- 2011 – 10 K, 4th
- 2015 – 25 K, 2nd

U.S. Open Water National Championships

- 2008 – 5k, 10th
- 2009 – 10 K, 4th
- 2011 – 10 K, Gold Medalist

Olympic Trials

- 2008 – 1500 Free, 34th

U.S. National Championships

- 2007 – 1500 Free, 15th

NCAA Championships

- 2010 – 1650 Free, 14th

High School

- 2005 – 500 Free, New York State Champion
- 2006 – 500 Free, New York State Champion

== See also ==
- Harvard Crimson
- List of Harvard University people
