= Mission Viejo Nadadores =

California swim team

The Mission Viejo Nadadores is one of the largest swimming and diving clubs in the United States. The team is located in Mission Viejo, California, with training at the Marguerite Aquatic Center. The "Nadadores" were started in 1968 and have had athletes at every Olympics since 1976. The team holds the record for winning the most team titles at the USA swimming Nationals, having won 48. The Dive Team has also won 48 National Championship and is the only team in history to sweep all 4 World Championships in one year.

At the 1984 Summer Olympics, Nadadores athletes won 13 medals (10 Gold). Notable alumni include: Brian Goodell, Shirley Babashoff, Mary T. Meagher, Robin Leamy, Greg Louganis, Michele Mitchell, Amy Shaw, Wendy Wyland, Jennifer Chandler, Wendy Williams (diver), Matt Scoggin, Megan Neyer, Ricardo Prado, Louise Messinger, Jesse Vassallo, Tiffany Cohen, Chloe Sutton, Dara Torres, Chad Carvin, Coach Mike O'Brien, Coach Mark Schubert, Coach Ron O'Brien, Coach Terry Stoddard, Coach Dr. Sammy Lee, Coach Jim Montrella, and 2008 US Olympic Open Water Coach Coach John Dussliere.

Founded by the Mission Viejo Company in 1968, during the tenure of Mark Schubert who coached from 1972 to 1985, and 2016 to 2022, the Nadadores won 18 National Championships. Under Terry Stoddard who coached from 1985-1992, the Nadadores won an additional national championship in 1986. Bill Rose, a member of the American Swimming Coaches Association Hall of Fame, coached the Nadadores from 1992-2017. Michele Mitchell has served as the High Performance Director and Head Coach of the Diving Team. At the 2004 Summer Olympic Games, Nadadore Larsen Jensen, (American Record Holder) captured a Silver Medal in the Men's 1500 freestyle.

In 2007, the oldest swimming world record was broken by Kate Ziegler in the 1500m freestyle at the TYR Swim Meet of Champions, which the team hosts annually.
