= Valerio Cleri =

Italian swimmer

Personal information
- Full name: Valerio Cleri
- Nationality: Italy
- Born: 19 June 1981 (age 45) Palestrina
- Height: 1.77 m (5 ft 9 1/2 in)

Sport
- Sport: Swimming
- Strokes: Freestyle
Medal record
Men's Swimming
Representing Italy
World Championships
Gold medal – first place	2009 Rome	25km Open Water
World Open Water Championships
Gold medal – first place	2010 Roberval	10km Open Water
Silver medal – second place	2006 Naples	10 km
Silver medal – second place	2010 Roberval	25km Open Water
European Aquatics Championships
Gold medal – first place	2008 Dubrovnik	25 km
Gold medal – first place	2010 Budapest	25km Open Water
Silver medal – second place	2010 Budapest	10km Open Water

Valerio Cleri (born 19 June 1981 in Palestrina) is a freestyle swimmer from Italy, who primarily competes in open water swimming.

== Career ==
Cleri won a gold medal in the 25 km open water race at the 2009 World Aquatics Championships in Rome. At the 2010 FINA World Open Water Swimming Championships in Canada he won the gold medal over the 10 km distance. At the 2010 European Aquatics Championships in Budapest, Hungary he won silver medal over the 10 km distance and gold medal over the 25 km distance. He competed at the 10 km swimming marathon at the 2008 Summer Olympics (finishing fourth) and at the 2012 Summer Olympics (finishing 17th).

Awards
Preceded by (Germany) Thomas Lurz	World Open Water Swimmer of the Year; 2010	Succeeded by (Germany) Thomas Lurz and (Greece) Spyridon Gianniotis
Preceded by First award	FINA Open Water Swimmer of the Year; 2010	Succeeded by (Germany) Thomas Lurz
