= Artistic swimming at the 2020 Summer Olympics – Women's duet =

Women's Duet at the Games of the XXXII Olympiad
- Venue: Tokyo Aquatics Centre
- Dates: 2–4 August 2021
- Competitors: 44 from 22 nations

Medalists
1st place, gold medalist(s)		Svetlana Kolesnichenko; Svetlana Romashina	ROC
2nd place, silver medalist(s)		Huang Xuechen; Sun Wenyan	China
3rd place, bronze medalist(s)		Marta Fiedina; Anastasiya Savchuk	Ukraine

The women's duet event at the 2020 Summer Olympics in Tokyo, Japan, took place at the Tokyo Aquatics Centre from 2 to 4 August 2021. It was the 9th time the women's duet event was held at the Olympic Games.

Russian synchronized swimmers won this event for the sixth time in a row, with Svetlana Romashina becoming a six-time Olympic champion.

== Competition format ==
The preliminary phase consisted of a free routine, then a technical routine with required elements. The scores from the two routines were added together and the top twelve duets qualified for the final. The final repeated the same free routine and the score from the final free routine was added to the score from the preliminary technical routine to decide the overall winners. Both preliminary free and technical routines starting lists were decided by random draw. For the final however, two groups were made: the last six and the first six qualified duets, the former group starting first.

The technical routine must be completed in between 2 minutes 5 seconds and 2 minutes 35 seconds. There are 3 panels of 5 judges for each routine. In the technical routine, one panel each considers execution (30% of score), impression (30%), and elements (40%). The execution and impression judges each give a single score, while the elements judges give a score for each element. Scores are between 0 and 10, with 0.1 point increments. The highest and lowest score from each panel (including within each element, for the elements panel) are discarded. The remaining scores are averaged and weighted by the percentage for that panel, with element scores weighted within the element panel by degree of difficulty. The maximum possible score is 100. In addition to a lift, jump, or throw (which can be placed anywhere in the routine, there are 5 required elements, which must be done in order:

1. Difficulty 2.3: Starting in Vertical position. Full twist as one leg is bent to Bent Knee Vertical position. Another full twist while the leg is straightened. Finally, a 1080 degree continuous spin.
2. Difficulty 2.9: Starting in Back Layout position. Transitions to Ballet Leg, then Surface Flamingo, then Surface Ballet Leg Double, then Submerged Back Pike positions. A 360 degree rotation ends in Surface Flamingo position. Transitions back through Ballet Leg to Back Layout position.
3. Difficulty 2.8: Starting in Fishtail position. 2 rapid rotations, totaling 720 degrees. One full twist as leg is raised into Vertical position. A 720 degree continuous spin.
4. Difficulty 3.0: Begins with a Cyclone into Vertical position. Half twist. Another 180 degree rotation while transitioning into Split position. Ending with a Walkout Front.
5. Difficulty 2.5: Starting in Submerged Back Pike position. Thrust to Vertical; maintaining height, one leg brought down to Fishtail position. A 360 spin while returning to Vertical position.

The free routine time limits are 2 minutes 45 seconds to 3 minutes 15 seconds. There is no restriction on the routine. The 3 panels for the free routine consider execution (30% of score), artistic impression (40%), and difficulty (30%). Each judge gives a single score. The highest and lowest score from each panel are discarded, with the remaining scores averaged and weighted. The maximum possible score is 100.

== Qualification ==
A total of 22 duets qualify for the event. The 10 National Olympic Committees (NOC) qualified for the team competition were automatically awarded a place for duets. Each continent also received one dedicated duet place; Africa, Asia, and Oceania used the 2019 World Aquatics Championships to determine their selections, while the 2019 Pan American Games and the 2019 European Champions Cup served as qualifiers for the Americas and Europe. The final 7 places will be determined through a 2020 Olympic Qualification Tournament.

New Zealand declined the duet quota.

== Schedule ==
All times are Japan Standard Time (UTC+9)

The schedule for the women's duet event covers three consecutive days of competition.

Date	Time	Round
Monday, 2 August 2021	19:30	Preliminary Free Routine
Tuesday, 3 August 2021	19:30	Preliminary Technical Routine
Wednesday, 4 August 2021	19:30	Final Free Routine

== Results ==
=== Preliminary ===
Top 12 qualify for the Final

Rank	Nation	Athletes	Free Preliminary	Technical	Total
1	ROC	Svetlana Kolesnichenko & Svetlana Romashina	97.9000	97.1079	195.0079
2	China	Huang Xuechen & Sun Wenyan	96.2333	95.5499	191.7832
3	Ukraine	Marta Fiedina & Anastasiya Savchuk	94.9333	93.8620	188.7953
4	Japan	Yukiko Inui & Megumu Yoshida	93.9333	93.3499	187.2832
5	Canada	Claudia Holzner & Jacqueline Simoneau	91.2333	91.4798	182.7131
6	Italy	Linda Cerruti & Costanza Ferro	91.2000	91.1035	182.3035
7	Austria	Anna-Maria Alexandri & Eirini Alexandri	90.5000	90.3773	180.8773
8	France	Charlotte Tremble & Laura Tremble	88.5667	87.3474	175.9141
9	Netherlands	Bregje de Brouwer & Noortje de Brouwer	88.1667	87.2612	175.4279
10	Belarus	Vasilina Khandoshka & Daria Kulagina	88.0333	87.2101	175.2434
11	Spain	Alisa Ozhogina & Iris Tió	88.3000	86.9281	175.2281
12	Mexico	Nuria Diosdado & Joana Jiménez	86.5333	86.6190	173.1523
13	United States	Anita Alvarez & Lindi Schroeder	86.5333	86.1960	172.7293
14	Great Britain	Kate Shortman & Isabelle Thorpe	84.7333	85.1548	169.8881
15	Israel	Eden Blecher & Shelly Bobritsky	84.6333	83.8580	168.4913
16	Kazakhstan	Alexandra Nemich & Yekaterina Nemich	83.8667	83.2338	167.1005
17	Liechtenstein	Lara Mechnig & Marluce Schierscher	83.0333	83.2489	166.2822
18	Colombia	Estefanía Álvarez & Mónica Arango	81.9667	82.0526	164.0193
19	Egypt	Hanna Hiekal & Laila Mohsen	78.9000	77.8625	156.7625
20	Australia	Emily Rogers & Amie Thompson	76.3667	75.5343	151.9010
21	South Africa	Clarissa Johnston & Laura Strugnell	72.1667	70.9099	143.0766
	Greece	Evangelia Platanioti & Evangelia Papazoglou	88.1667	DNS (Note: Originally advanced to the preliminary technical routine, but one of the team members tested positive for COVID-19 as the team was forced to withdraw from the event)	88.1667

=== Final ===
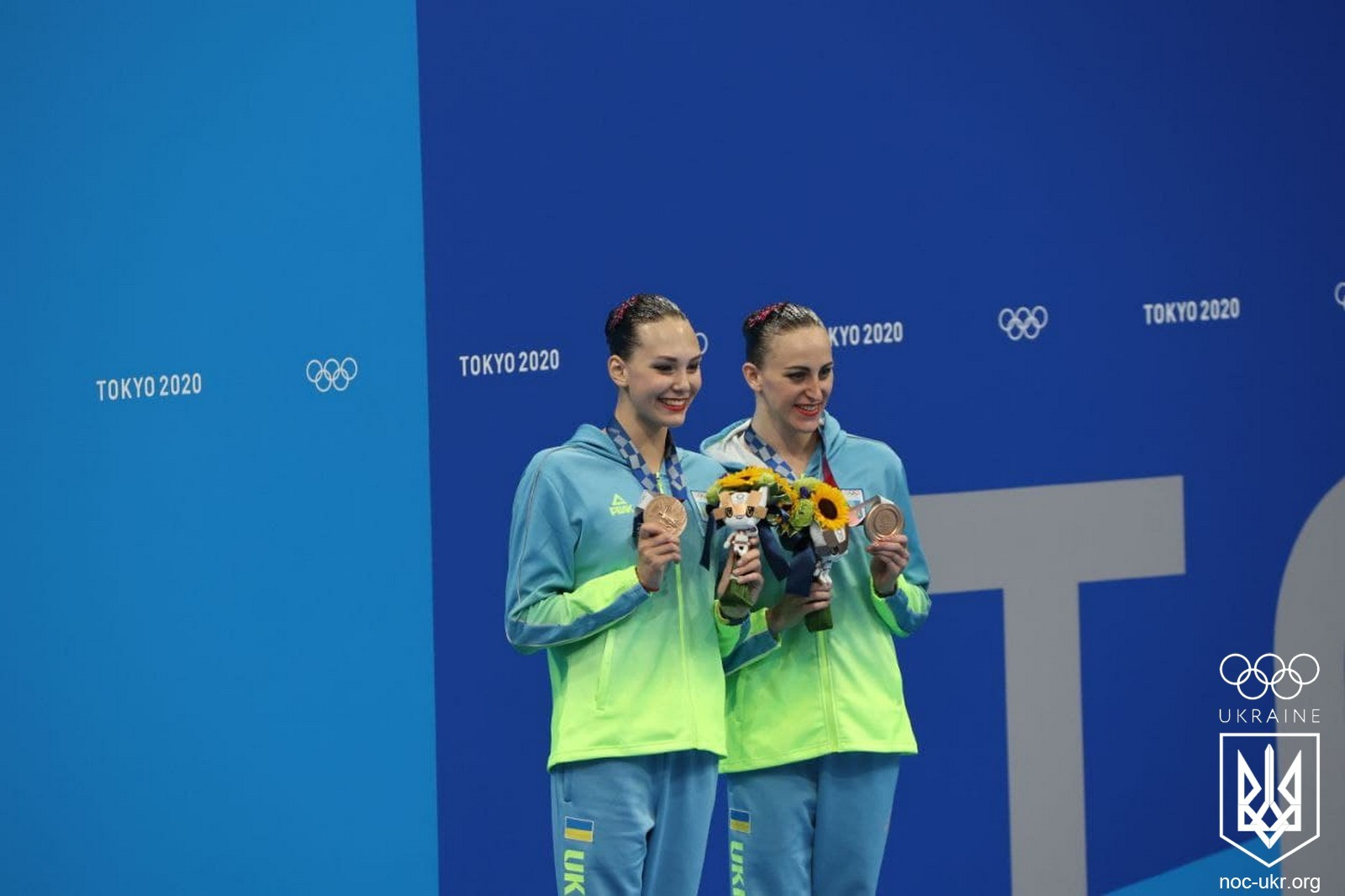
Fiedina and Savchuk with their bronze medals during the victory ceremony

The final will be contested by the top 12 duets in the preliminary round. The technical routine score will carry over from the preliminary round to the final, but the free routine will be repeated.

Rank	Nation	Athletes	Technical	Free Final	Total
1st place, gold medalist(s)	ROC	Svetlana Kolesnichenko & Svetlana Romashina	97.1079	98.8000	195.9079
2nd place, silver medalist(s)	China	Huang Xuechen & Sun Wenyan	95.5499	96.9000	192.4499
3rd place, bronze medalist(s)	Ukraine	Marta Fiedina & Anastasiya Savchuk	93.8620	95.6000	189.4620
4	Japan	Yukiko Inui & Megumu Yoshida	93.3499	94.4667	187.8166
5	Canada	Claudia Holzner & Jacqueline Simoneau	91.4798	93.0000	184.4798
6	Italy	Linda Cerruti & Costanza Ferro	91.1035	92.4667	183.5702
7	Austria	Anna-Maria Alexandri & Eirini Alexandri	90.3773	91.8000	182.1773
8	France	Charlotte Tremble & Laura Tremble	87.3474	89.6333	176.9807
9	Netherlands	Bregje de Brouwer & Noortje de Brouwer	87.2612	88.9000	176.1612
10	Spain	Alisa Ozhogina & Iris Tió	86.9281	88.6667	175.5948
11	Belarus	Vasilina Khandoshka & Daria Kulagina	87.2101	87.8000	175.0101
12	Mexico	Nuria Diosdado & Joana Jiménez	86.6190	86.5667	173.1857
