= Synchronized swimming at the 2014 Central American and Caribbean Games =

Synchronized Swimming at the 2014 Central American and Caribbean Games
- Venue: Leyes de Reforma Aquatic Center
- Location: (Mexico) Veracruz
- Dates: 15-21 November

The Synchronized swimming competition at the 2014 Central American and Caribbean Games was held in Veracruz, Mexico.

The tournament was scheduled to be held from 15–21 November at the Leyes de Reforma Aquatic Center.

== Medal summary ==
=== Women's events ===
Event	Gold	Silver	Bronze
Solo Technical Routine	Nuria Diosdado (MEX)	Mónica Arango (COL)	Greisy Gomez (VEN)
Solo Free Routine	Nuria Diosdado (MEX)	Jennifer Cerquera (COL)	Karla Loaiza (VEN)
Duet Technical Routine	Mexico (MEX); Blanca Delgado; Nuria Diosdado	Colombia (COL); Estefanía Álvarez; Mónica Arango	Venezuela (VEN); Oriana Carrillo; Greisy Gomez
Duet Free Routine	Mexico (MEX); Blanca Delgado; Nuria Diosdado	Colombia (COL); Estefanía Álvarez; Mónica Arango	Aruba (ARU); Anouk Eman; Kyra Hoevertsz
Team Technical Routine	Mexico (MEX); Karem Achach; Karla Arreola; Mariana Cifuentes; Nuria Diosdado; Evelyn Guajardo; Joana Jimenez; Sofia Rios; Luisa Rodriguez	Colombia (COL); Estefanía Álvarez; Mónica Arango; Jennifer Cerquera; Zully Perez; Jhoselyne Taborda; Ingrid Usuga; Viviana Valle; Daniela Velez	Venezuela (VEN); Laumeth Araque; Albany Avila; Oriana Carrillo; Maria Escalona; Greisy Gomez; Wendy Hernandez; Karla Loaiza; Maria Laura Villasana
Team Free Routine	Mexico (MEX); Karem Achach; Karla Arreola; Mariana Cifuentes; Blanca Delgado; Evelyn Guajardo; Joana Jimenez; Luisa Rodriguez; Jessica Sobrino	Colombia (COL); Estefanía Álvarez; Mónica Arango; Jennifer Cerquera; Jessica Grajales; Zully Perez; Jhoselyne Taborda; Viviana Valle; Daniela Velez	Venezuela (VEN); Laumeth Araque; Albany Avila; Valeria Bermudez; Oriana Carrillo; Maria Escalona; Greisy Gomez; Karla Loaiza; Maria Laura Villasana
Free Routine Combination	Mexico (MEX); Karem Achach; Karla Arreola; Mariana Cifuentes; Blanca Delgado; Nuria Diosdado; Evelyn Guajardo; Joana Jimenez; Sofia Rios; Luisa Rodriguez; Jessica Sobrino	Colombia (COL); Estefanía Álvarez; Mónica Arango; Jennifer Cerquera; Jessica Grajales; Zully Perez; Jhoselyne Taborda; Ingrid Usuga; Viviana Valle; Daniela Velez; Jhossely Zafra	Venezuela (VEN); Laumeth Araque; Albany Avila; Valeria Bermudez; Patricia Camaran; Oriana Carrillo; Maria Escalona; Greisy Gomez; Wendy Hernandez; Karla Loaiza; Maria Laura Villasana

== Medal table ==
* Host nation (Mexico)

Rank	Nation	Gold	Silver	Bronze	Total
1	Mexico (MEX)*	7	0	0	7
2	Colombia (COL)	0	7	0	7
3	Venezuela (VEN)	0	0	6	6
4	Aruba (ARU)	0	0	1	1
Totals (4 entries)		7	7	7	21
