= Mexico at the 2015 Pan American Games =

- IOC code: MEX
- NOC: Comité Olímpico Mexicano (in Spanish)

in Toronto, Canada 10–26 July 2015
- Competitors: 509 in 36 sports
- Flag bearer (opening): Paola Longoria
- Flag bearer (closing): Paola Longoria
- Medals Ranked 6th: Gold 22 Silver 30 Bronze 43 Total 95

Pan American Games appearances (overview)
- 1951; 1955; 1959; 1963; 1967; 1971; 1975; 1979; 1983; 1987; 1991; 1995; 1999; 2003; 2007; 2011; 2015; 2019; 2023

Mexico competed in the 2015 Pan American Games in Toronto, Ontario, Canada from July 10 to 26, 2015.

Racquetball Paola Longoria was the flagbearer of the team during the opening ceremony.

== Competitors ==
The following table lists Mexico's delegation per sport and gender.

Sport	Men	Women	Total
Archery	3	3	6
Athletics	22	17	39
Badminton	4	4	8
Basketball	12	0	12
Beach volleyball	2	2	4
Bowling	2	2	4
Boxing	8	2	10
Canoeing	11	7	18
Cycling	9	8	17
Diving	4	4	8
Equestrian	10	3	13
Fencing	9	6	15
Field hockey	16	16	32
Football	18	18	36
Golf	2	2	4
Gymnastics	6	14	20
Handball	0	15	15
Judo	6	6	12
Karate	2	4	6
Modern pentathlon	3	2	5
Roller sports	3	3	6
Roller sports	3	3	6
Rowing	12	3	15
Rugby sevens	12	12	24
Sailing	7	4	11
Shooting	12	7	19
Softball	15	0	15
Squash	3	3	6
Swimming	12	14	26
Synchronized swimming	0	9	9
Table tennis	3	3	6
Taekwondo	4	4	8
Tennis	3	3	6
Triathlon	3	3	6
Volleyball	12	0	12
Water polo	13	13	26
Water skiing	4	1	5
Weightlifting	5	4	9
Wrestling	6	4	10
Total	281	228	509

== Medalists ==
Medal	Name	Sport	Event	Date
Gold	Rommel Pacheco	Diving	Men's 3 m springboard	July 11
Gold	Paola Espinosa	Diving	Women's 10 m platform	July 11
Gold	Ivan García	Diving	Men's 10 m platform	July 12
Gold	Crisanto Grajales	Triathlon	Men's Individual	July 12
Gold	Rommel Pacheco; Jahir Ocampo	Diving	Men's synchronized 3 m springboard	July 13
Gold	Paola Espinosa; Dolores Hernández	Diving	Women's synchronized 3 m springboard	July 13
Gold	Mike Páez	Roller sports	Men's 10,000 metres points race	July 13
Gold	Goretti Zumaya	Shooting	Women's 10 m air rifle	July 13
Gold	Alan Armenta; Alexis López	Rowing	Men's lightweight double sculls	July 14
Gold	Juan René Serrano; Luis Álvarez; Ernesto Horacio Boardman	Archery	Men's team	July 17
Gold	Luis Álvarez	Archery	Men's individual	July 18
Gold	María Guadalupe González	Athletics	Women's 20 km walk	July 19
Gold	Carlos Navarro	Taekwondo	Men's 58 kg	July 19
Gold	Saul Gutiérrez	Taekwondo	Men's 68 kg	July 20
Gold	Rodolfo Ontiveros; Juan Virgen	Beach volleyball	Men's tournament	July 21
Gold	Brenda Flores	Athletics	Women's 10,000 m	July 23
Gold	Joselito Velázquez	Boxing	Men's light flyweight	July 24
Gold	Paola Longoria	Racquetball	Women's singles	July 24
Gold	Paola Longoria; Samantha Salas	Racquetball	Women's doubles	July 24
Gold	Juan Luis Barrios	Athletics	Men's 5000 m	July 25
Gold	Álvaro Beltrán; Daniel de la Rosa; Javier Moreno	Racquetball	Men's team	July 26
Gold	Paola Longoria; Samantha Salas; Susana Acosta	Racquetball	Women's team	July 26
Silver	Nuria Diosdado; Karem Achach	Synchronized swimming	Women's Duet	July 11
Silver	Nuria Diosdado; Karem Achach; Teresa Alonso; Karla Arreola; Blanca Delgado; Evelyn Guajardo; Joana Jiménez; Luisa Rodríguez; Jessica Sobrino	Synchronized swimming	Women's team	July 11
Silver	Paola Diaz	Triathlon	Women's Individual	July 11
Silver	Jahir Ocampo	Diving	Men's 3 m springboard	July 11
Silver	Alejandra Zavala	Shooting	Women's 10 m air pistol	July 12
Silver	Bredni Roque	Weightlifting	Men's 69 kg	July 12
Silver	Vanessa Zambotti	Judo	Women's +78 kg	July 14
Silver	Alí Soto	Wrestling	Men's Greco-Roman 59 kg	July 15
Silver	Victoria Rodríguez	Tennis	Women's Singles	July 16
Silver	Victoria Rodríguez; Marcela Zacarías	Tennis	Women's Doubles	July 16
Silver	Alma Valencia	Wrestling	Women's Freestyle 53 kg	July 16
Silver	Aída Román; Alejandra Valencia; Karla Hinojosa	Archery	Women's team	July 17
Silver	Ignacio Prado	Cycling	Men's omnium	July 17
Silver	César Salazar; Eric Gálvez; Arturo Salazar	Squash	Men's team	July 17
Silver	Tamara Vega	Modern pentathlon	Women's	July 18
Silver	David Mier	Sailing	Men's RS:X	July 18
Silver	Demita Vega	Sailing	Women's RS:X	July 18
Silver	Dafne Navarro Loza	Gymnastics	Women's trampoline	July 19
Silver	Ismael Hernández Uscanga	Modern pentathlon	Men's	July 19
Silver	Itzel Manjarrez	Taekwondo	Women's 49 kg	July 19
Silver	Paulina Armeria	Taekwondo	Women's 57 kg	July 20
Silver	Brenda Flores	Athletics	Women's 5000 m	July 21
Silver	Victoria Heredia	Taekwondo	Women's 67 kg	July 21
Silver	Ignacio Prado	Cycling	Men's road time trial	July 22
Silver	María Espinoza	Taekwondo	Women's +67 kg	July 22
Silver	Úrusula González; María Pliego; Julieta Toledo	Fencing	Women's team sabre	July 23
Silver	Álvaro Beltrán	Racquetball	Men's singles	July 24
Silver	Lindolfo Delgado	Boxing	Men's Lightweight	July 25
Silver	Xhunashi Caballero	Karate	Women's 68 kg	July 25
Silver	Mexico men's national football team: Gibran Lajud; Carlos Guzmán; Hedgardo Marín; Luis López; José Abella; Josecarlos Van Rankin; Jonathan Espericueta; Uvaldo Luna; Marco Bueno; Ángel Zaldívar; Carlos Cisneros; Luis Cárdenas; Jordan Silva; Kevin Escamilla; Michael Pérez; Alfonso Tamay; Martín Zúñiga; Daniel Álvarez	Football	Men's tournament	July 26
Bronze	Edna Carrillo	Judo	Women's 48 kg	July 11
Bronze	Jonathan Ruvalcaba	Diving	Men's 10 m platform	July 12
Bronze	Dolores Hernández	Diving	Women's 3 m springboard	July 12
Bronze	Jorge Martínez	Roller sports	Men's 200 m time-trial	July 12
Bronze	César Salazar	Squash	Men's singles	July 12
Bronze	Samantha Terán	Squash	Women's singles	July 12
Bronze	Irving Pérez	Triathlon	Men's Individual	July 12
Bronze	Quisia Guicho	Weightlifting	Women's 58 kg	July 12
Bronze	Everardo Cristóbal	Canoeing	Men's C-1 1000 metres	July 13
Bronze	Paola Espinosa; Alejandra Orozco	Diving	Women's synchronized 10 m platform	July 13
Bronze	Isao Cárdenas	Judo	Men's 90 kg	July 13
Bronze	Jorge Martínez	Roller sports	Men's 500 m	July 13
Bronze	Samantha Terán; Karla Urrutia	Squash	Women's doubles	July 13
Bronze	Job Castillo; Lino Muñoz	Badminton	Men's doubles	July 14
Bronze	Karina Alanís; Maricela Montemayor	Canoeing	Women's K-2 500 m	July 14
Bronze	Daniel Corral	Gymnastics	Men's pommel horse	July 14
Bronze	José Cuevas	Judo	Men's +100 kg	July 14
Bronze	Diego Sánchez; Leopoldo Tejeda	Rowing	Men's coxless pair	July 14
Bronze	Aremi Fuentes	Weightlifting	Women's 69 kg	July 14
Bronze	Mariana Nava	Shooting	Women's 25 m pistol	July 15
Bronze	Juan Escobar	Wrestling	Men's Greco-Roman 75 kg	July 15
Bronze	Samantha Terán; Karla Urrutia; Diana García	Squash	Women's team	July 16
Bronze	Lizbeth Salazar; Sofía Arreola; Íngrid Drexel; Mayra Rocha	Cycling	Women's team pursuit	July 17
Bronze	Diana Miranda	Wrestling	Women's Freestyle 69 kg	July 17
Bronze	Karla Hinojosa	Archery	Women's individual	July 18
Bronze	Mayan Oliver	Modern pentathlon	Women's	July 18
Bronze	Jesse Ruiz	Wrestling	Men's Freestyle 97 kg	July 18
Bronze	Karla Diaz Arnal	Gymnastics	Women's rhythmic individual ball	July 19
Bronze	Juan Luis Barrios	Athletics	Men's 10,000 m	July 21
Bronze	Victoria Torres	Boxing	Women's light welterweight	July 21
Bronze	René Lizárraga	Taekwondo	Men's 80 kg	July 21
Bronze	Misael Rodríguez	Boxing	Men's Middleweight	July 22
Bronze	Daniel Gómez	Fencing	Men's foil	July 22
Bronze	Carolina Chapoy	Water skiing	Women's overall	July 22
Bronze	Rogelio Romero	Boxing	Men's Light heavyweight	July 23
Bronze	Daniel de la Rosa	Racquetball	Men's singles	July 23
Bronze	Álvaro Beltrán; Daniel de la Rosa	Racquetball	Men's doubles	July 23
Bronze	Mexico women's national football team: Cecilia Santiago; Pamela Tajonar; Kenti Robles; Christina Murillo; Greta Espinoza; Valeria Miranda; Jennifer Ruiz; Nayeli Rangel; Teresa Noyola; Nancy Antonio; Stephany Mayor; Mónica Ocampo; Bianca Sierra; Arianna Romero; Monica Alvarado; Fabiola Ibarra; Verónica Pérez; Maria Sánchez	Football	Women's tournament	July 24
Bronze	Daniel Vargas	Karate	Men's 67 kg	July 24
Bronze	Merillela Arreola	Karate	Women's 61 kg	July 24
Bronze	Daniel Gómez; Raúl Arízaga; Jesús Beltrán	Fencing	Men's team foil	July 25
Bronze	Denisse Hernández; Nataly Michel; Melissa Rebolledo	Fencing	Women's team foil	July 25
Bronze	Horacio Nava	Athletics	Men's 50 kilometres walk	July 26

Medals by sport
Sport	1st place, gold medalist(s)	2nd place, silver medalist(s)	3rd place, bronze medalist(s)	Total
Diving	5	1	3	9
Racquetball	4	1	2	7
Athletics	3	1	2	6
Taekwondo	2	4	1	7
Archery	2	1	1	4
Boxing	1	1	3	5
Shooting	1	1	1	3
Triathlon	1	1	1	3
Roller sports	1	0	2	3
Rowing	1	0	1	2
Beach volleyball	1	0	0	1
Wrestling	0	2	3	5
Cycling	0	2	1	3
Modern pentathlon	0	2	1	3
Sailing	0	2	0	2
Synchronized swimming	0	2	0	2
Tennis	0	2	0	2
Squash	0	1	4	5
Fencing	0	1	3	4
Judo	0	1	3	4
Gymnastics	0	1	2	3
Karate	0	1	2	3
Weightlifting	0	1	2	3
Football	0	1	1	2
Canoeing	0	0	2	2
Badminton	0	0	1	1
Water skiing	0	0	1	1
Total	22	30	43	95

== Aquatics ==
=== Diving ===
Mexico has qualified a full team of eight athletes (four men and four women).

Men
Athlete	Event	Preliminary		Final	
Athlete	Event	Points	Rank	Points	Rank
Rommel Pacheco	Men's 3 m Springboard	466.35	1 Q	483.35	1st place, gold medalist(s)
Jahir Ocampo	Men's 3 m Springboard	383.35	6 Q	442.15	2nd place, silver medalist(s)
Iván García	Men's 10 m Platform	437.55	2 Q	521.70	1st place, gold medalist(s)
Jonathan Ruvalcaba	Men's 10 m Platform	428.65	4 Q	437.5	3rd place, bronze medalist(s)
Rommel Pacheco; Jahir Ocampo	Men's 3 m Synchro	—N/a		438.27	1st place, gold medalist(s)
Iván García; Jonathan Ruvalcaba	Men's 10 m Synchro Platform	—N/a		381.18	4

Women
Athlete	Event	Preliminary		Final	
Athlete	Event	Points	Rank	Points	Rank
Arantxa Chávez	Women's 3 m Springboard	281.20	7 Q	321.80	4
Dolores Hernández	Women's 3 m Springboard	307.90	4 Q	323.10	3rd place, bronze medalist(s)
Paola Espinosa	Women's 10 m Platform	347.25	2 Q	383.20	1st place, gold medalist(s)
Alejandra Orozco	Women's 10 m Platform	312.60	5 Q	345.05	4
Paola Espinosa; Dolores Hernández	Women's 3 m Synchro	—N/a		301.20	1st place, gold medalist(s)
Paola Espinosa; Alejandra Orozco	Women's 10 m Synchro Platform	—N/a		287.91	3rd place, bronze medalist(s)

=== Swimming ===
Mexico qualified 26 swimmers (12 men and 14 women)

Men
Athlete	Event	Heat		Final	
Athlete	Event	Time	Rank	Time	Rank
Luis Campos	100 m freestyle	51.29	5 FB	51.70	13
Luis Campos	200 m freestyle	1:50.24	4 FB	1:51.37	14
Long Yuan Gutiérrez	200 m freestyle	1:54.46	6	DNA	18
Ricardo Vargas	400 m freestyle	3:53.40	3 FA	3:55.42	8
Arturo Pérez Vertti	400 m freestyle	4:00.28	6 FB	4:00.96	16
Ricardo Vargas	1500 m freestyle	—N/a		15:27.23	9
Arturo Pérez Vertti	1500 m freestyle	—N/a		15:42.39	11
Daniel Torres	100 m backstroke	57.38	4 FB	56.91	10
Ezequiel Trujillo	200 m backstroke	2:03.51	5 FB	2:03.09	12
Andy Song An	200 m backstroke	2:04.00	4 FB	2:02.20	10
Miguel de Lara	100 m breastroke	1:01.85	2 FA	1:01.42	6
Miguel de Lara	200 m breastroke	2:13.79	3 FA	2:14.11	7
Miguel Chávez	200 m breastroke	2:16.07	4 FB	2:15.19	10
Long Yuan Gutiérrez	100 m butterfly	52.57	2 FA	52.58	5
Long Yuan Gutiérrez	200 m butterfly	2:00.30	4 FB	2:00.09	9
José Martínez	200 m butterfly	2:03.15	5 FB	2:02.39	13
Ezequiel Trujillo	200 metre individual medley	2:05.69	4 FB	2:04.83	11
José Martínez	200 metre individual medley	2:03.30	3 FB	2:02.95	10
Juan del Pino	400 metre individual medley	4:28.37	4 FB	4:26.29	10
Julio Olvera	400 metre individual medley	DSQ			
José Martínez; Long Yuan Gutiérrez; Luis Campos; Julio Olvera	4 × 200 metre freestyle relay	7:30.34	5 FA	7:22.12	5
Long Yuan Gutiérrez; Luis Campos; Daniel Torres; Miguel de Lara	4 × 100 metre medley relay	3:45.60	4 FA	3:42.77	7
Daniel Delgadillo	10 km open water	—N/a		2:00:07.4	10
Arturo Pérez Vertti	10 km open water	—N/a		2:00:55.2	11

Women
Athlete	Event	Heat		Final	
Athlete	Event	Time	Rank	Time	Rank
Liliana Ibáñez	50 m freestyle	25.46	4 FB	25.48	9
Liliana Ibáñez	100 m freestyle	55.80	4 FB	55.90	9
Natalia Jaspeado	200 m freestyle	2:05.21	5 FB	2:03.69	12
María Richaud	200 m freestyle	2:06.84	5 FB	2:03.69	12
Natalia Jaspeado	200 m freestyle	4:18.30	3 FB	4:17.25	11
Allyson Macías	200 m freestyle	4:20.45	5 FB	4:17.49	12
Natalia Jaspeado	800 m freestyle	—N/a		8:53.70	11
Monserrat Oruño	800 m freestyle	—N/a		8:45.81	8
Fernanda González	100 m backstroke	1:01.25	2 FA	1:01.06	6
Estela Davis	100 m backstroke	1:03.36	4 FB	1:03.19	12
Fernanda González	200 m backstroke	2:14.28	3 FA	2:16.79	8
Estela Davis	200 m backstroke	2:16.49	4 FB	2:16.61	10
Esther González	100 m breaststroke	1:10.83	4 FB	1:10.54	10
Arantxa Medina	100 m breaststroke	1:11.70	4 FB	1:11.32	12
Esther González	200 m breaststroke	2:28.15	2 FA	2:29.83	7
Byanca Rodríguez	200 m breaststroke	2:28.73	3 FA	2:28.87	5
Diana Luna	100 m butterfly	1:01.85	5 FB	1:01.49	11
Ana Sofía Revilak	100 m butterfly	1:01.25	4 FB	1:01.16	10
Diana Luna	200 m butterfly	2:14.21	3 FA	2:13.90	7
Esther González	200 metre individual medley	DNS			
Arantxa Medina	200 metre individual medley	2:19.26	3 FB	2:18.82	11
Natalia Jaspeado	400 metre individual medley	4:51.69	4 FA	4:49.89	6
Moniika González-Hermosillo	400 metre individual medley	4:52.24	5 FA	4:53.83	7
Natasha Gvakharia; María Richaud; Liliana Ibáñez; Esther González	4 × 100 metre freestyle relay	3:51.61	6 FA	3:47.65	6
Liliana Ibáñez; María Richaud; Esther González; Natalia Jaspeado	4 × 200 metre freestyle relay	8:22.04	4 FA	DSQ	
Liliana Ibáñez; Fernanda González; Ana Sofía Revilak; Byanca Rodríguez	4 × 100 metre medley relay	4:12.63	4 FA	4:08.26	5
Monserrat Ortuño	10 km open water	—N/a		2:06:28.2	11
Zaira Cárdenas	10 km open water	—N/a		2:03:28.3	6

=== Synchronized swimming ===
Mexico has qualified a full team of nine athletes.

Athlete	Event	Technical Routine		Free Routine (Final)			
Athlete	Event	Points	Rank	Points	Rank	Total Points	Rank
Nuria Diosdado; Karem Achach	Women's duet	84.4133	2	86.3667	2	170.7800	2nd place, silver medalist(s)
Nuria Diosdado; Karem Achach; Teresa Alonso; Karla Arreola; Blanca Delgado; Evelyn Guajardo; Joana Jiménez; Luisa Rodríguez; Jessica Sobrino	Women's team	85.6740	2	86.8333	2	172.5073	2nd place, silver medalist(s)

== Archery ==
Mexico has qualified the maximum team of three men and three women, for a total of six athletes.

Men
Athlete	Event	Ranking Round		Round of 32	Round of 16	Quarterfinals	Semifinals	Final / BM	Rank
Athlete	Event	Score	Seed	Opposition Score	Opposition Score	Opposition Score	Opposition Score	Opposition Score	Rank
Juan René Serrano	Individual	656	8	T Flossbach (GUA); L 6 -4	Did not advance				17
Luis Álvarez	Individual	663	5	Ó Ticas (ESA); W 6 – 0	D Betancur (COL); W 6 – 0	M Dalmeida (BRA); W 7 3	Z Garrett (USA); W 3 -7	B Ellison (USA); W 6 – 4	1st place, gold medalist(s)
Ernesto Boardman	Individual	659	6	D Martínez (DOM); L 6 -0	Did not advance				17
Juan René Serrano; Luis Álvarez; Ernesto Boardman	Team	1978	2	—N/a		Chile; W 0 – 6	Cuba; W 4 – 5	United States; W 2 – 6	1st place, gold medalist(s)

Women
Athlete	Event	Ranking Round		Round of 32	Round of 16	Quarterfinals	Semifinals	Final / BM	Rank
Athlete	Event	Score	Seed	Opposition Score	Opposition Score	Opposition Score	Opposition Score	Opposition Score	Rank
Aída Román	Individual	655	2	Y Camilo (DOM); W 0 – 6	G Thiffeault (CAN); W 0 – 6	M Sarduy (CUB); W 3 – 7	K Lorig (USA); L 6 – 5	K Hinojosa (MEX); L 6 – 4	4
Alejandra Valencia	Individual	655	1	C García (DOM); W 6 – 0	M Sepúlveda (COL); W 4 – 6	Did not advance			9
Karla Hinojosa	Individual	651	4	K Chang (CHI); W 2 – 6	S Nikitin (BRA); W 2 – 6	N Sánchez (COL); W 5 – 6	A Rendón (COL); L 6 – 0	A Román (MEX); W 6 – 4	3rd place, bronze medalist(s)
Aída Román; Alejandra Valencia; Karla Hinojosa	Team	1961	1	—N/a	BYE	Chile; W 6 – 0	Venezuela; W 6 – 2	Colombia; L 1 – 5	2nd place, silver medalist(s)

== Athletics ==
Mexico's team consists on 39 athletes (22 men and 17 women).

Key

- Note–Ranks given for track events are for the entire round
- Q = Qualified for the next round
- q = Qualified for the next round as a fastest loser or, in field events, by position without achieving the qualifying target
- NR = National record
- GR = Games record
- PB = Personal best
- DNF = Did not finish
- NM = No mark
- N/A = Round not applicable for the event
- Bye = Athlete not required to compete in round

Men
Athlete	Event	Round 1		Semifinal		Final	
Athlete	Event	Result	Rank	Result	Rank	Result	Rank
César Ramírez	200 m	20.64	5	Did not advance			16
James Eichberger	800 m	—N/a		1:49.68	6	DNA	10
José Juan Esparza	1500 m	—N/a				3:42.52	5
José Juan Esparza	5000 m	—N/a				13:51.50	7
Juan Luis Barrios	5000 m	—N/a				13:46.47	1st place, gold medalist(s)
Juan Luis Barrios	10,000 m	—N/a				28:51.57	3rd place, bronze medalist(s)
Genaro Rodríguez	110 m hurdles	—N/a		14.15	6	DNA	18
Sergio Rios	400 m hurdles	—N/a		53.37	7	DNA	20
Luis Enrique Ibarra	3000 m steeplechase	—N/a				8:57.70	6
Eder Sánchez	20 km walk	—N/a				1:28.16	7
Julio César Salazar	20 km walk	—N/a				1:25.11	4
Christian David Berdeja	50 km walk	—N/a				4:05.44	5
Horacio Nava	50 km walk	—N/a				3:57.28	3rd place, bronze medalist(s)
Alejandro Suárez	Marathon	—N/a				DNF	
Daniel de Jesús Vargas	Marathon	—N/a				2:17.57	4

Field events

Athlete	Event	Qualification		Final	
Athlete	Event	Distance	Position	Distance	Position
Edgar Rivera	High jump	—N/a		2.20	7
Luis Rivera	Long jump	7.85	2 q	7.63	9
Mario Cota	Shot put	—N/a		17.53	11
Stephen Sáenz	Shot put	—N/a		18.58	8
Mario Cota	Discus throw	—N/a		59.89	8
Diego del Real	Hammer throw	—N/a		71.74	6

Combined events – Decathlon
Athlete	Event	100 m	LJ	SP	HJ	400 m	110H	DT	PV	JT	1500 m	Final	Rank
Rodrigo Sagaón	Result	10.80	6.33 m	13.18 m	1.82 m	49.00	14.75	NM	4.00 m	56.77 m	4:33.00	6659	11
Rodrigo Sagaón	Points	906	659	678	644	861	880	0	617	689	725	6659	11
Román Garibay	Result	11.12	6.82 m	14.23 m	1.85 m	52.06	15.41	44.51 m	4.20 m	65.78 m	4:49.12	7419 PB	10
Román Garibay	Points	834	771	742	670	722	801	757	673	825	624	7419 PB	10

Women
Athlete	Event	Round 1		Semifinal		Final	
Athlete	Event	Result	Rank	Result	Rank	Result	Rank
Gabriela Medina	800 m	—N/a		2:03.94	4 q	2:03.91	6
Cristina Guevara	1500 m	—N/a				4:20.40	7
Brenda Flores	5000 m	—N/a				15:47.19	2nd place, silver medalist(s)
Brenda Flores	10,000 m	—N/a				32:41.33 PR	1st place, gold medalist(s)
Marisol Romero	10,000 m	—N/a				33:16.12	6
Zudikey Rodríguez	400 m hurdles	—N/a		57.64	2 Q	57.56	6
Ana Narváez	3000 m steeplechase	—N/a				10:04.86	5
Gabriela Medina; Natali Brito; Paola Morán; Zudikey Rodríguez	4 × 400 metres relay	—N/a		3:32.29	5	DNA	9
Alejandra Ortega	20 km walk	—N/a				1:35.03	8
María Guadalupe González	20 km walk	—N/a				1:29.24 PR	1st place, gold medalist(s)
Margarita Hernández	Marathon	—N/a				2:41.57	6
Vianey de la Rosa	Marathon	—N/a				2:51.42	10

Field events
Athlete	Event	Qualification		Final	
Athlete	Event	Distance	Position	Distance	Position
Ximena Esquivel	High jump	—N/a		1.80	8
Abigail Gómez	Javelin throw	—N/a		NM	

Combined events – Heptathlon
Athlete	Event	100H	HJ	SP	200 m	LJ	JT	800 m	Final	Rank
Jessamyn Sauceda	Result	14.09	1.74 m	12.16 m	25.11	6.35 m	38.51 m	2:23.97	5786	8
Jessamyn Sauceda	Points	966	903	672	877	959	639	770	5786	8

== Badminton ==
Mexico has qualified a team of eight athletes (four men and four women).

Men
Athlete	Event	First round	Second round	Third round	Quarterfinals	Semifinals	Final	Rank
Athlete	Event	Opposition Result	Opposition Result	Opposition Result	Opposition Result	Opposition Result	Opposition Result	Rank
Lino Muñoz	Men's singles	BYE	J Guardado (ESA); W 2 -0	B Seguin (USA); W 2 -0	O Guerrero (CUB); L 2 – 0	Did not advance		5
Luis Ramón Garrido	Men's singles	BYE	J Guevara (PER); W 2 -0	K Cordón (GUA); L 0 -2	Did not advance			14
Job Castillo	Men's singles	A Corpancho (PER); W 2 -0	J Sánchez (VEN); W 2 -0	YC Oliveira (BRA); L 0 -2	Did not advance			13
Job Castillo; Lino Muñoz	Men's doubles	—N/a		BYE	M Cuba (PER); M Valle (PER); W 2 – 0	P Chew (USA); S Pongnairat (USA); L 2 – 0	DNA	3rd place, bronze medalist(s)
Luis Ramón Garrido; Antonio Ocegueda	Men's doubles	—N/a		L Martínez (CUB); E Reyes (CUB); L 1 – 2	Did not advance			12

Women

Athlete	Event	First round	Second round	Third round	Quarterfinals	Semifinals	Final	Rank
Athlete	Event	Opposition Result	Opposition Result	Opposition Result	Opposition Result	Opposition Result	Opposition Result	Rank
Haramara Gaitán	Women's singles	BYE	S Scott (BAR); W 2 -0	LM Zornoza (PER); W 2 - 1	J Subandhi (USA); L 2 – 0	Did not advance		6
Mariana Ugalde	Women's singles	N Sotomayor (GUA); W 2 -0	K Wynter (JAM); W 2 -0	F Silva (BRA); L 0 -2	Did not advance			13
Sabrina Solís	Women's singles	—N/a	M Zambrano (ECU); W 2 -0	R Honderich (CAN); L 0 -2	Did not advance			14
Haramara Gaitán; Cynthia González	Women's doubles	—N/a		PB Pereira (BRA); F Silva (BRA); W 0 – 2	R Honderich (CAN); M Li (CAN); W 0 – 2	Did not advance		6

Mixed
Athlete	Event	First round	Second round	Quarterfinals	Semifinals	Final	Rank
Athlete	Event	Opposition Result	Opposition Result	Opposition Result	Opposition Result	Mixed doubles	Rank
Antonio Ocegueda; Sabrina Solís	Mixed doubles	A Corpancho (PER); LM Zornoza (PER); L 0 -2	Did not advance				26
Lino Muñoz; Cynthia González	Mixed doubles	H Arthuso (BRA); F Silva (BRA); W 2 -1	P Chew (USA); J Subandhi (BRA); L 2 – 0	Did not advance			9

== Basketball ==
Mexico has qualified a men's team of 12 athletes.

=== Men's tournament ===
Squad: The Mexico men's national basketball team roster for the 2015 Pan American Games.

Mexico men's national basketball team – 2015 Pan American Games roster
Players
Coaches

Pos.	No.	Name	Age – Date of birth	Height	Club
SF	4	González, Jesús	29 – 14 Jul 1986	1.95 m (6 ft 5 in)	(Mexico) Pioneros de Cancún
PF	5	Ramos, Marco	28 – 26 Feb 1987	2.00 m (6 ft 7 in)	(Mexico) Halcones Rojos Veracruz
C	6	Garibay, Edgar	25 – 5 Mar 1990	2.11 m (6 ft 11 in)	(Mexico) Gigantes del Estado de México
PG	7	Toussaint, Carlos	23 – 24 Oct 1991	1.82 m (6 ft 0 in)	(Mexico) Gigantes del Estado de México
C	8	López, Jesús	31 – 18 Dec 1983	2.05 m (6 ft 9 in)	(Mexico) Pioneros de Cancún
SG	9	Cruz, Francisco	25 – 3 Oct 1989	1.90 m (6 ft 3 in)	(Mexico) Halcones de Xalapa
PG	10	Girón, Gabriel	27 – 27 Feb 1988	1.92 m (6 ft 4 in)	(Mexico) Fuerza Regia
PG	11	Meza, Pedro	29 – 15 Oct 1985	1.92 m (6 ft 4 in)	(Mexico) Halcones de Xalapa
PF	12	Hernández, Héctor	30 – 15 Jun 1985	2.05 m (6 ft 9 in)	(Mexico) Pioneros de Quintana Roo
SG	13	Méndez-Valdez, Orlando	29 – 29 Apr 1986	1.83 m (6 ft 0 in)	(Mexico) Halcones de Xalapa
C	14	Zamora, Adrián	28 – 28 Oct 1986	2.06 m (6 ft 9 in)	(Mexico) Halcones Rojos Veracruz
C	15	Gutiérrez, Israel	22 – 15 Jan 1993	2.06 m (6 ft 9 in)	(Mexico) Halcones Rojos Veracruz

Head coach

(Spain) Sergio Valdeolmillos

Legend

- Age – as of 16 July 2015
- Club – before start of Games

Group B

Team	Pld	W	L	PF	PA	PD	Pts	Qualification
Canada	3	3	0	289	247	+42	6	Qualified for the semifinals
Dominican Republic	3	1	2	253	255	−2	4 (Note: 1st tie-breaker: The bottom 3 teams had the exact same head-to-head record of 1–1) (Note: 2nd tie-breaker: Dominican Republic had a +15 head-to-head point differential, Argentina had a +8 head-to-head point differential, and Mexico had a −23 head-to-head point differential.)	Qualified for the semifinals
Argentina	3	1	2	247	244	+3	4	
Mexico	3	1	2	232	275	−43	4	

Notes:

21 July 2015
13:30

Report

Mexico	86–84 (OT)	Argentina
Scoring by quarter: 12–15, 25–14, 27–22, 12–25, Overtime: 10–8
Pts: Hernández 19; Rebs: Gutiérrez 14; Asts: Cruz 2		Pts: Laprovíttola 21; Rebs: Delía 10; Asts: Campazzo 5

Ryerson Athletic Centre, Toronto

22 July 2015
10:30

Report

Dominican Republic	95–70	Mexico
Scoring by quarter: 24–20, 27–20, 30–16, 14–14
Pts: Stokley 22; Rebs: Manuel Guzmán 6 Asts: Acosta, Suero 3		Pts: Cruz 21; Rebs: Ramos, Gutiérrez 7 Asts: Girón 7

Ryerson Athletic Centre, Toronto

23 July 2015
18:00

Report

Canada	96–76	Mexico
Scoring by quarter: 27–16, 22–23, 22–18, 25–19
Pts: Heslip 20; Rebs: Nicholson 10; Asts: Cadougan, Murray 2		Pts: Mendez 24; Rebs: Garibay 6 Asts: Giron 4

Ryerson Athletic Centre, Toronto

Seventh place match

24 July 2015
10:30

Report

Venezuela	83–59	Mexico
Scoring by quarter: 16–6, 28–23, 19–15, 19–15
Pts: Cox 24; Rebs: Vargas 6 Asts: Vargas 4		Pts: Gonzalez, Ramos 11; Rebs: Gonzalez, Gutiérrez 7 Asts: Cruz 4

Ryerson Athletic Centre, Toronto

Final rank:' 8th

== Bowling ==
Mexico has qualified a total of four athletes.

Singles
Athlete	Event	Qualification															Eighth Finals	Quarterfinals	Semifinals	Finals	
Athlete	Event	Block 1 (Games 1–6)						Block 2 (Games 7–12)						Total	Average	Rank	Eighth Finals	Quarterfinals	Semifinals	Finals	
Athlete	Event	1	2	3	4	5	6	7	8	9	10	11	12	Total	Average	Rank	Opposition Scores	Opposition Scores	Opposition Scores	Opposition Scores	Rank
Alejandro Cruz	Men's																				
Mario Quintero	Men's																				
Iliana Lomelí	Women's																				
Sandra Guadalupe Góngora	Women's																				

Pairs
Athlete	Event	Block 1 (Games 1–6)								Block 2 (Games 7–12)								Grand Total	Final Rank
Athlete	Event	1	2	3	4	5	6	Total	Average	7	8	9	10	11	12	Total	Average	Grand Total	Final Rank
Alejandro Cruz; Mario Quintero	Men's																		
Illiana Lomelí; Sandra Guadalupe Góngora	Women's																		

== Boxing ==
|+Men

Athlete	Event	Preliminaries	Quarterfinals	Semifinals	Final
Athlete	Event	Opposition Result	Opposition Result	Opposition Result	Opposition Result
Joselito Vázquez	Light flyweight				
Orlando Huitzil	Flyweight				
Lindolfo Delgado	Lightweight				
Raúl Curiel	Light Welterweight				
Marvin Cabrera	Welterweight				
Misael Rodríguez	Middleweight				
Rogelio Romero	Light Heavyweight				
Édgar Ramírez	Super Heavyweight	—N/a			

Women
Athlete	Event	Quarterfinals	Semifinals	Final
Athlete	Event	Opposition Result	Opposition Result	Opposition Result
Sulem Urbina	Flyweight			
Victoria Torres	Light welterweight			

== Canoeing ==
=== Slalom ===
Mexico has qualified 3 athletes in the following boats:

Athlete(s)	Event	Preliminary						Semifinal		Final	
Athlete(s)	Event	Run 1	Rank	Run 2	Rank	Best	Rank	Time	Rank	Time	Rank
Nicolás Sierra	Men's C-1										
Andrés Sierra	Men's K-1										
Sofía Reinoso Díaz	Women's K-1										

=== Sprint ===
Mexico has qualified 15 athletes in the sprint discipline (6 in men's kayak, 5 in women's kayak, 3 in men's canoe and 1 in women's canoe).

Men
Athlete	Event	Heats		Semifinals		Final	
Athlete	Event	Time	Rank	Time	Rank	Time	Rank
Omar Alejandro Peña	K-1 200 m						
Jonathan Ballina	K-1 1000 m						
Agustín Medina; Jordán Salazar	K-2 200 m						
Agustín Medina; Jordán Salazar	K-2 1000 m						
Javier López Quintero; Jesús Nestor Valdez; Jordán Salazar; Osbaldo Fuentes	K-4 1000 m	—N/a					
Everardo Cristóbal	C-1 1000 m						
Everardo Cristóbal; Adolfo Cámara	C-2 1000 m						

Women
Athlete	Event	Heats		Semifinals		Final	
Athlete	Event	Time	Rank	Time	Rank	Time	Rank
Rosa Hinojosa	K-1 500 m	2:05.279	4 QS	2:03.383	1 QF		
Maricela Montemayor; Karina Alanís	K-2 500 m						
Brenda Gutiérrez; Karina Alanís; Maricela Montemayor; Beatriz Briones	K-4 500 m	—N/a				1:38.007	4
Abigail Morales	C-1 200 m	—N/a					

Qualification Legend: QF = Qualify to final; QS = Qualify to semifinal

== Cycling ==
Mexico has qualified 9 male riders and 8 female riders for a total of 17 athletes.

BMX
Athlete	Event	Seeding		Quarterfinal		Semifinal		Final	
Athlete	Event	Result	Rank	Points	Rank	Points	Rank	Result	Rank
Christopher Mireles	Men's BMX	38.464	10	15	5	Did not advance			
Alan Román	Men's BMX	Did not start							

Mountain biking
Athlete	Event	Time	Rank
José Juan Escárcega	Men's cross-country		
José Gerardo Ulloa	Men's cross-country		
Daniela Campuzano	Women's cross-country		
Laura Lorenza Morfín	Women's cross-country		

Road cycling
Athlete	Event	Final	
Athlete	Event	Time	Rank
José Ramón Aguirre	Men's road race		
Ignacio de Jesús Prado	Men's road race		
Ignacio Sarabia	Men's road race		
Juan Pablo Magallanes	Men's road race		
Íngrid Drexel	Women's road race		
Laura Lorenza Morfín	Women's road race		
Lizbeth Salazar	Women's road race		

Track cycling
Keirin

Athlete	Event	1st round	Final
Athlete	Event	Rank	Rank
Daniela Gaxiola	Women's keirin		

Sprint
Athlete	Event	Qualification		Round 1	Repechage 1	Quarterfinals	Semifinals	Final	
Athlete	Event	Time Speed (km/h)	Rank	Opposition Time Speed (km/h)	Opposition Time Speed (km/h)	Opposition Time Speed (km/h)	Opposition Time Speed (km/h)	Opposition Time Speed (km/h)	Rank
Daniela Gaxiola	Women's sprint								
Frany María Fong	Women's sprint								

Omnium
Athlete	Event	Flying lap		Points race		Elimination race	Individual pursuit		Scratch race	Time trial		Total points	Rank
Athlete	Event	Time	Rank	Points	Rank	Rank	Time	Rank	Rank	Time	Rank	Total points	Rank
Ignacio Sarabia	Men's omnium												

Team pursuit and sprint
Athlete	Event	Qualification		Semifinals		Final	
Athlete	Event	Time	Rank	Opponent results	Rank	Opponent results	Rank
Ignacio Sarabia; José Ramón Aguirre; Diego Jonathan Yépez; Ignacio de Jesús Prado	Men's team pursuit						
Sofía Arreola; Íngrid Drexel; Mayra Del Rocio Rocha; Lizbeth Salazar	Women's team pursuit						
Daniela Gaxiola; Frany María Fong	Women's team sprint						

== Equestrian ==
Mexico qualified a full team of twelve athletes (four per discipline).

Dressage
Athlete	Horse	Event	Round 1		Round 2		Final			
Athlete	Horse	Event	Score	Rank	Score	Rank	Score	Rank	Total Score	Rank
Bernadette Pujals	Heslegaards Rolex	Individual	69.440	12						
Jesús Enrique Palacios	Wizard Banamex	Individual	69.526	10						
José Luis Padilla	Donnesberg	Individual	66.237	23						
Mariana Quintana	Guapo	Individual	Did not start							
Bernadette Pujals; Jesús Enrique Palacios; José Luis Padilla; Mariana Quintana	See above	Team	206.703	3	—N/a					

Eventing
Athlete	Horse	Event	Dressage		Cross-country		Jumping				Total	
Athlete	Horse	Event	Dressage		Cross-country		Qualifier		Final		Total	
Athlete	Horse	Event	Penalties	Rank	Penalties	Rank	Penalties	Rank	Penalties	Rank	Penalties	Rank
Daniela Moguel		Individual										
Guillermo Germán del Campo		Individual										
José Alan Triana		Individual										
José Enrique Mercado		Individual										
Daniela Moguel; Guillermo Germán del Campo; José Alan Triana; José Enrique Mercado	See above	Team										

Jumping

Individual
Athlete	Horse	Event	Round 1		Round 2			Round 3			Final					
Athlete	Horse	Event	Round 1		Round 2			Round 3			Round A		Round B		Total	
Athlete	Horse	Event	Penalties	Rank	Penalties	Total	Rank	Penalties	Total	Rank	Penalties	Rank	Penalties	Rank	Penalties	Rank
Federico Fernández		Individual														
José Alberto Martínez		Individual														
José Antonio Chedraui		Individual														
Mario Oñate		Individual														
Salvador Oñate		Individual														

Team
Athlete	Horse	Event	Qualifying round		Final					
Athlete	Horse	Event	Qualifying round		Round 1		Round 2		Total	
Athlete	Horse	Event	Penalties	Rank	Penalties	Rank	Penalties	Rank	Penalties	Rank
Federico Fernández; José Alberto Martínez; José Antonio Chedraui; Mario Oñate; Salvador Oñate	See above	Team								

== Fencing ==
Mexico has qualified 15 fencers (9 men, 6 women).

Men
Athlete	Event	Pool Round		Round of 16	Quarterfinals	Semifinals	Final / BM	
Athlete	Event	Result	Seed	Opposition Score	Opposition Score	Opposition Score	Opposition Score	Rank
	Épée							
	Épée Team	—N/a						
	Foil							
	Foil Team	—N/a						
	Sabre							
	Sabre Team	—N/a						

Women
Athlete	Event	Pool Round		Round of 16	Quarterfinals	Semifinals	Final / BM	
Athlete	Event	Result	Seed	Opposition Score	Opposition Score	Opposition Score	Opposition Score	Rank
	Foil							
	Foil Team	—N/a						
	Sabre							
	Sabre Team	—N/a						

== Field hockey ==
Mexico has qualified both a men's and women's teams, for a total of 32 athletes (16 men and 16 women).

=== Men's tournament ===
- Francisco Aguilar
- Edgar Borquez Silva
- Alexis Campillo Lopez
- Daniel Castillo Ortiz
- Irvin Chavez Gomez
- Edgar Garcia Lopez
- Roberto Garcia Lopez
- Ricardo Garcia Miranda
- Jose Hernandez
- Ruben Martinez Munive
- Pol Moreno Quiroz
- Miguel Othon Moreno
- Guillermo Pedraza Saenz
- Bruno Peraza Garcia
- Moises Vargas Garcia
- Argenis Vasquez Garcia

Pool B

Pos	Team	Pld	W	D	L	GF	GA	GD	Pts	Qualification
1	Canada (H)	3	3	0	0	18	2	+16	9	Quarter-finals
2	Chile	3	2	0	1	6	4	+2	6	Quarter-finals
3	Brazil	3	1	0	2	3	12	−9	3	Quarter-finals
4	Mexico	3	0	0	3	3	12	−9	0	Quarter-finals

Source: FIH
Rules for classification: 1) points; 2) matches won; 3) goal difference; 4) goals for; 5) head-to-head result.
(H) Hosts

14 July 2015
17:00

Chile	3–2	Mexico
Richter 25'; Martín 34'; Rodríguez 56'	Report	Campillo 2'; Pedraza 55'

Umpires:
Grant Hundley (USA)
Donny Gobinsingh (TTO)

16 July 2015
17:00

Brazil	1–0	Mexico
Paixao 44'	Report

Umpires:
You Suolong (CHN)
Donny Gobinsingh (TTO)

18 July 2015
19:00

Canada	8–1	Mexico
Ho-Garcia 6', 14', 52', 54'; Sarmento 31', 47'; Guest 38'; Wharton 55'	Report	Campillo 36'

Umpires:
Federico Garcia (URU)
Andres Ledesma (ARG)

=== Women's tournament ===
The Mexico field hockey women's team that will compete at the 2015 Pan American Games:

- Maribel Acosta
- Mireya Bianchi
- Ahide Castillo
- Cindy Correa
- María Correa
- Marlet Correa
- Eliana Cota
- Arlette Estrada
- María Hinojosa
- Montserrat Inguanzo
- Ana Juarez
- Michel Navarro
- Karen Orozco
- Fernanda Oviedo
- Jéssica Sánchez
- Jennifer Valdes

Pool A

Pos	Team	Pld	W	D	L	GF	GA	GD	Pts	Qualification
1	Argentina	3	3	0	0	26	0	+26	9	Quarterfinals
2	Canada	3	2	0	1	16	6	+10	6	Quarterfinals
3	Mexico	3	0	1	2	1	14	−13	1	Quarterfinals
4	Dominican Republic	3	0	1	2	2	25	−23	1	Quarterfinals

Source: FIH
Rules for classification: 1) points; 2) goal difference; 3) goals scored; 4) head-to-head result.

13 July 2015
17:00

Argentina	9–0	Mexico
Merino 7', 22'; Ortiz 10'; Barrionuevo 21', 35'; Albertarrio 24', 26'; Habif 36'; Rodríguez 58'	Report

Umpires:
Suzi Sutton (USA)
Aleesha Unka (NZL)

15 July 2015
17:00

Mexico	1–1	Dominican Republic
Sánchez 35'	Report	Oflaherti Paganini 26'

Umpires:
Meghan McLennan (CAN)
Soledad Iparraguirre (ARG)

17 July 2015
19:00

Mexico	0–4	Canada
	Report	Johansen 17'; Culley 26'; Haughn 30', 56'

Umpires:
Verónica Villafañe (ARG)
Nur Hafizah Azman (MAS)

Quarterfinal

20 July 2015
11:30

Chile	7–0	Mexico
García 1'; Villagra 11'; Urroz 24', 34', 44'; Vidaurre 37'; Venegas 40'	Report

Umpires:
Aleesha Unka (NZL)
Ayanna McClean (TTO)

Classification semifinal

22 July 2015
09:00

Cuba	0–1	Mexico
	Report	C. Correa 10'

Umpires:
Camila Cabargas (CHI)
Nur Hafizah Azman (MAS)

Fifth place match

24 July 2015
11:30

Mexico	1–1	Uruguay
Marlet Correa 24'	Report	Casarotti 44'
Penalties
Orozco (penalty shoot-out missed); María Correa (penalty shoot-out missed); Marlet Correa (penalty shoot-out scored); Oviedo (penalty shoot-out scored); Navarro (penalty shoot-out missed)	2–3	Vilar del Valle (penalty shoot-out scored); Norbis (penalty shoot-out scored); Lamberti (penalty shoot-out scored); Villar (penalty shoot-out missed)

Umpires:
Meghan McLennan (CAN)
Megan Robertson (CAN)

2015 Pan American Games 6th

Mexico

== Football ==
Mexico has qualified a men's and women's teams for a total of 36 athletes (18 male and 18 female).

=== Men's tournament ===
Squad

The roster for Mexico was as follows.

Head Coach: Raúl Gutiérrez

No.	Pos.	Player	Date of birth (age)	Club
1	GK	Gibrán Lajud	25 December 1993 (aged 21)	(Mexican Football Federation) Tijuana
2	DF	Carlos Guzmán	19 May 1994 (aged 21)	(Mexican Football Federation) Tijuana
3	DF	Hedgardo Marín	21 February 1993 (aged 22)	(Mexican Football Federation) Guadalajara
4	DF	Luis López	25 August 1993 (aged 21)	(Mexican Football Federation) Monterrey
5	DF	José Abella	10 February 1994 (aged 21)	(Mexican Football Federation) Santos Laguna
6	DF	Josecarlos Van Rankin	14 May 1993 (aged 22)	(Mexican Football Federation) UNAM
7	MF	Jonathan Espericueta	9 August 1994 (aged 20)	(Mexican Football Federation) UANL
8	MF	Uvaldo Luna	21 December 1993 (aged 21)	(Mexican Football Federation) UANL
9	FW	Marco Bueno	31 March 1994 (aged 21)	(Mexican Football Federation) León
10	FW	Ángel Zaldívar	8 February 1994 (aged 21)	(Mexican Football Federation) Guadalajara
11	MF	Carlos Cisneros	30 August 1993 (aged 21)	(Mexican Football Federation) Guadalajara
12	GK	Luis Cárdenas	15 September 1993 (aged 21)	(Mexican Football Federation) Monterrey
13	DF	Jordan Silva	30 July 1994 (aged 20)	(Mexican Football Federation) Toluca
14	MF	Kevin Escamilla	21 February 1994 (aged 21)	(Mexican Football Federation) UNAM
15	MF	Michael Pérez	14 March 1994 (aged 21)	(Mexican Football Federation) Guadalajara
16	MF	Alfonso Tamay	13 May 1993 (aged 22)	(Mexican Football Federation) Puebla
17	FW	Martín Zúñiga	14 April 1993 (aged 22)	(Mexican Football Federation) América
18	MF	Daniel Álvarez	22 July 1994 (aged 20)	(Mexican Football Federation) Atlas

Group B

Pos	Team	Pld	W	D	L	GF	GA	GD	Pts	Qualification
1	Mexico	3	2	1	0	6	3	+3	7	Medal round
2	Uruguay	3	2	0	1	5	1	+4	6	Medal round
3	Paraguay	3	1	1	1	6	3	+3	4	
4	Trinidad and Tobago	3	0	0	3	3	13	−10	0	

Source: Toronto 2015
July 13, 2015
20:35

Paraguay	1–1	Mexico
Cardozo 71'	Report	Zúñiga 15'

Hamilton Pan Am Soccer Stadium, Hamilton
Referee: Mathieu Bourdeau (Canada)

July 17, 2015
17:35

Mexico	1–0	Uruguay
Silva 90+1'	Report

Hamilton Pan Am Soccer Stadium, Hamilton
Referee: Marcos Brea (Cuba)

July 21, 2015
17:35

Trinidad and Tobago	2–4	Mexico
John 7'; Henry 39'	Report	Espericueta 60'; Álvarez 68'; Bueno 90'; Zúñiga 90+3'

Hamilton Pan Am Soccer Stadium, Hamilton
Referee: Sherwim Moore (Guyana)

Semifinal

July 23, 2015
20:35

Mexico	2–1	Panama
Zaldívar 2'; Cisneros 61'	Report	Núñez 59'

Hamilton Pan Am Soccer Stadium, Hamilton
Referee: Javier Santos (Puerto Rico)

Gold medal match

July 26, 2015
13:05

(gold) Uruguay	1–0	Mexico (silver)
Lozano 11'	Report

Hamilton Pan Am Soccer Stadium, Hamilton
Referee: Óscar Reyna (Guatemala)

=== Women's tournament ===
Squad

Head coach: (Mexico) Leonardo Cuellar

No.	Pos.	Player	Date of birth (age)	Club
1	GK	Cecilia Santiago	19 October 1994 (aged 20)	(United States Soccer Federation) FC Kansas City
12	GK	Pamela Tajonar	2 December 1984 (aged 30)	(Royal Spanish Football Federation) Sevilla FC
2	DF	Kenti Robles	15 February 1991 (aged 24)	(Royal Spanish Football Federation) RCD Espanyol
3	DF	Christina Murillo	28 January 1993 (aged 22)	(United States Soccer Federation) University of Michigan
4	DF	Greta Espinoza	5 June 1995 (aged 20)	(United States Soccer Federation) Sedona FC Strikers
5	DF	Valeria Miranda	18 August 1992 (aged 22)	(Mexican Football Federation) UNAM
6	MF	Jennifer Ruiz	9 August 1983 (aged 31)	(United States Soccer Federation) Seattle Reign FC
7	MF	Nayeli Rangel	28 February 1992 (aged 23)	(United States Soccer Federation) Sky Blue FC
8	MF	Teresa Noyola	15 April 1990 (aged 25)	(United States Soccer Federation) Houston Dash
9	MF	Nancy Antonio	2 April 1996 (aged 19)	(Mexican Football Federation) MacroSoccer
10	MF	Stephany Mayor	23 September 1991 (aged 23)	(Mexican Football Federation) UDLA
11	MF	Mónica Ocampo	4 January 1987 (aged 28)	(United States Soccer Federation) Sky Blue FC
13	DF	Bianca Sierra	25 June 1992 (aged 23)	(United States Soccer Federation) Boston Breakers
14	DF	Arianna Romero	29 July 1992 (aged 22)	(United States Soccer Federation) Washington Spirit
15	MF	Monica Alvarado	11 January 1991 (aged 24)	(United States Soccer Federation) Texas Christian University
16	MF	Fabiola Ibarra	2 February 1994 (aged 21)	(Mexican Football Federation) Tijuana
17	MF	Verónica Pérez	18 May 1988 (aged 27)	(United States Soccer Federation) Washington Spirit
18	MF	Maria Sánchez	20 February 1996 (aged 19)	(United States Soccer Federation) Idaho State Bengals

Group A

Pos	Team	Pld	W	D	L	GF	GA	GD	Pts	Qualification
1	Colombia	3	2	1	0	4	1	+3	7	Medal round
2	Mexico	3	2	0	1	6	3	+3	6	Medal round
3	Trinidad and Tobago	3	0	2	1	4	6	−2	2	
4	Argentina	3	0	1	2	3	7	−4	1	

Source: Toronto 2015
July 11, 2015
11:05

Mexico	0–1	Colombia
	Report	Usme 65'

Hamilton Pan Am Soccer Stadium, Hamilton
Referee: Maurees Skeete (Guyana)

July 14, 2015
17:35

Argentina	1–3	Mexico
Bonsegundo 82'	Report	Noyola 1'; Rangel 73'; Ruiz 76'

Hamilton Pan Am Soccer Stadium, Hamilton
Referee: Marianela Cruz (Costa Rica)

July 18, 2015
17:35

Trinidad and Tobago	1–3	Mexico
Shade 51' (pen.)	Report	Mayor 28', 45'; Ocampo 70'

Hamilton Pan Am Soccer Stadium, Hamilton
Referee: Mirian Leon (El Salvador)

Semifinal

July 22, 2015
17:35

Brazil	4–2	Mexico
Cristiane 4'; Rafaelle 45+1', 73'; Romero 46' (o.g.)	Report	Fabiana 25' (o.g.); Rangel 70'

Hamilton Pan Am Soccer Stadium, Hamilton
Referee: Marie-Soleil Beaudoin (Canada)

Bronze medal match

July 24, 2015
20:35

(bronze) Mexico	2–1	Canada
Ocampo 29'; Mayor 37'	Report	Fleming 88' (pen.)

Hamilton Pan Am Soccer Stadium, Hamilton
Referee: Ekaterina Koroleva (United States)

== Golf ==
Athlete(s)	Event	Final					
Athlete(s)	Event	Round 1	Round 2	Round 3	Round 4	Total	Rank
Álvaro Ortiz	Men's individual	78	77	74	74	303	27
Luis Gerardo Garza	Men's individual	79	73	70	77	299	23
Marijosse Navarro	Women's individual	73	68	73	71	285	4
Margarita Ramos	Women's individual	77	75	75	69	296	8
Álvaro Ortiz; Luis Gerardo Garza; Marijosse Navarro; Margarita Ramos	Mixed team	151	141	143	143	578	5

== Gymnastics ==
Mexico has qualified a total of 20 gymnasts in the following categories:

=== Artistic ===
Mexico qualified 10 athletes.

Men Team and Individual Qualification
Athlete	Event	Final							
Athlete	Event	Apparatus						Total	Rank
Athlete	Event	F	PH	R	V	PB	HB	Total	Rank
Daniel Corral	Qualification	14.300 Q	15.200 Q	14.950	13.700	15.000 Q	13.400	86.550	6 Q
Rodolfo Bonilla	Qualification	12.850	9.850	—N/a	13.200	14.000	12.550	62.450	38
Javier Balboa	Qualification	—N/a	12.100	14.750	—N/a	14.000	—N/a	40.850	52
Kevin Cerda	Qualification	14.450 Q	—N/a	13.550	14.350	—N/a	14.650	57.000	42
Javier Cervantes	Qualification	12.450	12.650	14.200	14.750	13.850	13.550	81.450	12 Q
Total	Team	41.600 (5)	39.950 (5)	43.900 (7)	42.800 (7)	43.000 (6)	41.600 (7)	252.850	6

Qualification Legend: Q = Qualified to apparatus final

Women Team and Individual Qualification
Athlete	Event	Final					
Athlete	Event	Apparatus				Total	Rank
Athlete	Event	F	V	UB	BB	Total	Rank
Elsa García	Qualification						
Alexa Moreno	Qualification						
Ana Lago	Qualification						
Athziri Sandoval	Qualification						
Karla Retiz	Qualification						
Total	Team						

Qualification Legend: Q = Qualified to apparatus final

=== Rhythmic ===
Mexico has qualified a full team of eight gymnasts (six in group and two in individual).

Individual
Athlete	Event	Final					
Athlete	Event	Hoop	Ball	Clubs	Ribbon	Total	Rank
Rut Castillo	Individual						
Karla Díaz	Individual						

Qualification Legend: Q = Qualified to apparatus final

Group
Athletes	Event	Final			
Athletes	Event	5 Ribbons	6 Clubs & 2 Hoops	Total	Rank
Diana Casillas; Luz Morales; Erándeni Nava; María Eugenia Nava; Marialicia Ortega; Pamela Reynolds	Group all-around				
Diana Casillas; Luz Morales; Erándeni Nava; María Eugenia Nava; Marialicia Ortega; Pamela Reynolds	Group 5 Ribbons		—N/a		
Diana Casillas; Luz Morales; Erándeni Nava; María Eugenia Nava; Marialicia Ortega; Pamela Reynolds	Group 6 Clubs & 2 Hoops	—N/a			

=== Trampoline ===
Mexico has qualified 2 athletes.

Athlete	Event	Qualification		Final	
Athlete	Event	Score	Rank	Score	Rank
José Alberto Vargas	Men's				
Dafne Navarro	Women's				

== Handball ==
Mexico has qualified a women's team of 15 athletes.

=== Women's tournament ===
coach: Monica Piña

- Itzel Aguirre
- Tania Navarro
- Guadalupe Saavedra
- Fernanda Rivera
- Violeta Yedra
- Denisse Romo
- Laura Morales
- Marlene Sosa
- Nashely Jaramillo
- Lucero Quezada
- Maria Rocha
- Manuela Zavala
- Anali Favela
- Belen Aguirre
- Selene Sifuentes

Group A

Team	Pld	W	D	L	GF	GA	GD	Pts	Qualification
Brazil	3	3	0	0	120	52	+68	6	Qualified for the Semifinals
Mexico	3	2	0	1	83	86	−3	4	Qualified for the Semifinals
Puerto Rico	3	0	1	2	72	98	−26	1	
Canada	3	0	1	2	55	94	−39	1	

July 16; 13:30	Mexico	25–22	Canada	Exhibition Centre – Hall B Referees: Lemes, Sosa (URU)
July 16; 13:30	Aguirre, Saavedra 4	(14–10)	Lochet 5	Exhibition Centre – Hall B Referees: Lemes, Sosa (URU)
July 16; 13:30	3× (yellow card) 4× (suspension)	Report	2× (yellow card) 4× (suspension)	Exhibition Centre – Hall B Referees: Lemes, Sosa (URU)

July 18; 13:30	Puerto Rico	30–39	Mexico	Exhibition Centre – Hall B Referees: Minore, Marina (ARG)
July 18; 13:30	Cabrera, Ceballos 6	(17–14)	Rocha 6	Exhibition Centre – Hall B Referees: Minore, Marina (ARG)
July 18; 13:30	3× (yellow card) 9× (suspension) 1× (red card)	Report	3× (yellow card) 3× (suspension)	Exhibition Centre – Hall B Referees: Minore, Marina (ARG)

July 20; 13:30	Brazil	34–19	Mexico	Exhibition Centre – Hall B Referees: Lemes, Sosa (URU)
July 20; 13:30	Nascimento 8	(19–12)	Jaramillo 3	Exhibition Centre – Hall B Referees: Lemes, Sosa (URU)
July 20; 13:30	3× (yellow card) 1× (suspension)	Report	3× (yellow card) 1× (suspension)	Exhibition Centre – Hall B Referees: Lemes, Sosa (URU)

Semifinal

July 22; 20:30	Mexico	16–27	Argentina	Exhibition Centre – Hall B Referees: Gjeding, Hansen (DEN)
July 22; 20:30	Jaramillo, Sifuentes 4	(6–11)	Pizzo 7	Exhibition Centre – Hall B Referees: Gjeding, Hansen (DEN)
July 22; 20:30	3× (yellow card) 3× (suspension)	report	3× (yellow card) 5× (suspension)	Exhibition Centre – Hall B Referees: Gjeding, Hansen (DEN)

Bronze medal match

July 24; 17:30	(bronze) Uruguay	29–21	Mexico	Exhibition Centre – Hall B Referees: Zuñiga, Reyes (CUB)
July 24; 17:30	Barreiro 11	(11–8)	Saavedra 7	Exhibition Centre – Hall B Referees: Zuñiga, Reyes (CUB)
July 24; 17:30	3× (yellow card) 2× (suspension)	Report	2× (yellow card) 6× (suspension)	Exhibition Centre – Hall B Referees: Zuñiga, Reyes (CUB)

== Judo ==
Mexico has qualified a team of twelve judokas (six men and six women).

Men
Athlete	Event	Round of 16	Quarterfinals	Semifinals	Repechage	Final / BM	
Athlete	Event	Opposition Result	Opposition Result	Opposition Result	Opposition Result	Opposition Result	Rank
Luis Alberto Damas	−60 kg	J Futtinico (COL); L 000S1 - 100	Did not advance				
David Tavera	−73 kg						
Germán Ayala	−81 kg						
Isao Cárdenas	−90 kg						
Jaime Esquivel	−100 kg						
José Cuevas	+100 kg						

Women
Athlete	Event	Round of 16	Quarterfinals	Semifinals	Repechage	Final / BM	
Athlete	Event	Opposition Result	Opposition Result	Opposition Result	Opposition Result	Opposition Result	Rank
Edna Carrillo	−48 kg	—N/a	J González (CHI); W 012 - 000S2	D Mestre (CUB); L 000S1 - 001S1	—N/a	I Sánchez (DOM); W 001S1 - 000	3rd place, bronze medalist(s)
Jennifer Cruz	−52 kg	—N/a	A Delgado (USA); L 000 - 011S1	—N/a	G Romero (CUB); L 000 - 100S1	DNA	7
Andrea Cassandra Gutiérrez	−63 kg						
Andrea Poo	−70 kg						
Norma Cárdenas	−78 kg						
Vanessa Zambotti	+78 kg						

== Karate ==
Mexico has qualified a team of two men and four women for a total of 6 athletes.

Men
Athlete	Event	Round robin				Semifinals	Final	
Athlete	Event	Opposition Result	Opposition Result	Opposition Result	Rank	Opposition Result	Opposition Result	Rank
Daniel Vargas	–67 kg							
Antonio Gutiérrez	–84 kg							

Women

Athlete	Event	Round robin				Semifinals	Final	
Athlete	Event	Opposition Result	Opposition Result	Opposition Result	Rank	Opposition Result	Opposition Result	Rank
Cecilia Cuéllar	–50 kg							
Merillela Arreola	–61 kg							
Xhunashi Caballero	–68 kg							
Guadalupe Quintal	+68 kg							

== Modern Pentathlon ==
Mexico has qualified a team of two men and two women for a total of 4 athletes.

Men
Athlete	Event	Fencing (Épée One Touch)			Swimming (200 m Freestyle)			Riding (Show Jumping)			Shooting/Running (10 m Air Pistol/3000m)			Total Points	Final Rank
Athlete	Event	Results	Rank	MP Points	Time	Rank	MP Points	Penalties	Rank	MP Points	Time	Rank	MP Points	Total Points	Final Rank
Ismael Hernández	Men's														
Jorge Inzunza	Men's														
Álvaro Sandoval	Men's														

Women
Athlete	Event	Fencing (Épée One Touch)			Swimming (200 m Freestyle)			Riding (Show Jumping)			Shooting/Running (10 m Air Pistol/3000m)			Total Points	Final Rank
Athlete	Event	Results	Rank	MP Points	Time	Rank	MP Points	Penalties	Rank	MP Points	Time	Rank	MP Points	Total Points	Final Rank
Tamara Vega	Women's														
Carmen Mayan	Women's														

== Racquetball ==
Mexico has qualified a team of three men and four women for a total of seven athletes.

Men
Athlete	Event	Qualifying Round robin				Round of 16	Quarterfinals	Semifinals	Final	Rank
Athlete	Event	Match 1	Match 2	Match 3	Rank	Opposition Result	Opposition Result	Opposition Result	Opposition Result	Rank
	Singles									
	Singles									
	Doubles	—N/a				—N/a				
Álvaro Beltrán; Daniel de la Rosa; Javier Moreno	Team	—N/a								

Women
Athlete	Event	Qualifying Round robin				Round of 16	Quarterfinals	Semifinals	Final	Rank
Athlete	Event	Match 1	Match 2	Match 3	Rank	Opposition Result	Opposition Result	Opposition Result	Opposition Result	Rank
Paola Longoria	Singles									
	Singles									
Paola Longoria	Doubles	—N/a				—N/a				
Paola Longoria; Samantha Salas; Susana Acosta	Team	—N/a								

== Roller sports ==
Mexico has qualified a team of three men and three women for a total of six athletes.

Figure skating

Athlete	Event	Short Program		Long Program	
Athlete	Event	Result	Rank	Result	Rank
Luis Felipe Reyna	Men's free skating	105.20	7		
Alejandra Hernández	Women's free skating	104.00	7		

Speed Skating

Men
Athlete	Event	Quarterfinals		Semifinals		Final Time	Rank
Athlete	Event	Time	Rank	Time	Rank	Final Time	Rank
	200 m time-trial	—N/a					
	500 m						
	Men's 10,000 m	—N/a					

Women
Athlete	Event	Quarterfinals		Semifinals		Final Time	Rank
Athlete	Event	Time	Rank	Time	Rank	Final Time	Rank
	200 m time-trial	—N/a					
	500 m						
	Women's 10,000 m	—N/a					

== Rowing ==
Mexico has qualified 9 boats.

Men
Athlete	Event	Heats		Repechage		Final	
Athlete	Event	Time	Rank	Time	Rank	Time	Rank
Juan Carlos Cabrera	Single Sculls	7:17.26	3 R	7:21.92	2 FA		
Miguel Carballo; Juan Flores	Double Sculls	6:57.92	4 R	6:53.47	2 FA		
Alan Armenta; Alexis López	Lwt Double Sculls	6:32.59	2 FA	—N/a			
Juan Francisco Jiménez; Juan José Flores; Miguel Ángel Carballo; Alan Armenta	Quadruple Sculls			—N/a			
Diego Sánchez; Leopoldo Tejada	Coxless Pair						
Hugo Carpio; José Alberto Arriaga; Klaus Rasmussen; Omar López	Coxless Four			—N/a			
	Lwt Coxless Four						

Women
Athlete	Event	Heats		Repechage		Final	
Athlete	Event	Time	Rank	Time	Rank	Time	Rank
Kenia Lechuga	Lwt Single Sculls						
Fabiola Núñez; Itzama Medina	Lwt Double Sculls	7:53.54	2 R	7:43.56	3 FA		

Qualification Legend: FA=Final A (medal); FB=Final B (non-medal); R=Repechage

== Rugby sevens ==
Mexico has qualified a men's and women's teams for a total of 24 athletes (12 men and 12 women).

=== Men's tournament ===
Group A

Team	Pld	W	D	L	PF	PA	PD	Pts	Qualification
United States	3	3	0	0	126	7	+119	9	Qualified for the quarterfinals
Uruguay	3	2	0	1	54	69	−15	7	Qualified for the quarterfinals
Chile	3	1	0	2	62	46	+16	5	Qualified for the quarterfinals
Mexico	3	0	0	3	0	120	−120	3	Qualified for the quarterfinals

11 July 2015
11:33

Uruguay	34–0	Mexico
	Report

Exhibition Stadium, Toronto

11 July 2015
16:05

United States	46–0	Mexico
	Report

Exhibition Stadium, Toronto

11 July 2015
18:49

Chile	38–0	Mexico
	Report

Exhibition Stadium, Toronto

=== Women's tournament ===
The Mexico women's rugby sevens team:

- Michelle Farah
- Maria Carrillo
- Bertha Landeros
- Alejandra Rosales
- Andrea Rodriguez
- Wendy Garcia
- Georgina Zenteno
- Dorian Avelar
- Bertha Fernandez
- Alma Rivera
- Paulina Islas
- Rosa Rivera

11 July 2015
10:49

Mexico	5–40	Argentina
	Report

Exhibition Stadium, Toronto

11 July 2015
13:33

Canada	60–0	Mexico
	Report

Exhibition Stadium, Toronto

11 July 2015
18:17

Colombia	24–19	Mexico
	Report

Exhibition Stadium, Toronto

12 July 2015
10:49

Mexico	0–71	United States
	Report

Exhibition Stadium, Toronto

12 July 2015
13:11

Brazil	57–0	Mexico
	Report

Exhibition Stadium, Toronto

== Sailing ==
Mexico qualified 6 boats.

Men
Athlete	Event	Race																	Net Points	Final Rank
Athlete	Event	1	2	3	4	5	6	7	8	9	10	11	12	13	14	15	16	M*	Net Points	Final Rank
David Mier y Terán	RS:X																			
Yanic Gentry	Laser																			

Women
Athlete	Event	Race																	Net Points	Final Rank
Athlete	Event	1	2	3	4	5	6	7	8	9	10	11	12	13	14	15	16	M*	Net Points	Final Rank
Demita Vega	RS:X																			
Natalia Montemayor	Laser Radial													—N/a						

Open

Athlete	Event	Race													Net Points	Final Rank
Athlete	Event	1	2	3	4	5	6	7	8	9	10	11	12	M*	Net Points	Final Rank
Jacobo Margules	Sunfish															
Armando Noriega; Carlota Iturbe	Hobie 16															
Kenneth Porter; Gerrit Gentry; Pamela Noriega; Daniel Baños	J/24															

== Shooting ==
Mexico has qualified 19 shooters.

Men
Event	Athlete	Qualification		Final	
Event	Athlete	Score	Rank	Score	Rank
Mario Gutiérrez	10 m air pistol				
Antonio Tavarez	10 m air pistol				
Adan Rodríguez	25 m rapid fire pistol				
Maurillo Morales	50 m pistol				
Luis Madrazo	10 m air rifle				
Luis Morales	50 m rifle prone				
José Luis Sánchez	50 m rifle three				
Álvaro Sánchez	50 m rifle three				
Juan Zanella	Trap				
Ramón Toca	Trap				
Luis Gallardo	Skeet				
Javier Rodríguez	Skeet				

Women
Event	Athlete	Qualification		Final	
Event	Athlete	Score	Rank	Score	Rank
Alejandra Zavala	10 m air pistol				
Nancy Alejandra Leal	10 m air pistol				
Salma Maricruz	10 m air rifle				
Alexis Martínez	50 m rifle three				
Andrea Palafox	50 m rifle three				
Anabel Molina	Skeet				
Gabriela Rodríguez	Skeet				

== Softball ==
Mexico has qualified a men's squad of 15 athletes.

=== Men's tournament ===
Group A

Team	Pld	W	L	RF	RA	RD	Qualification
Canada	5	5	0	33	13	+20	Qualified for the semifinals
Argentina	5	3	2	19	15	+4	Qualified for the semifinals
Venezuela	5	3	2	14	10	+4	Qualified for the semifinals
United States	5	2	3	16	10	+6	Qualified for the semifinals
Mexico	5	2	3	16	22	−6	
Dominican Republic	5	0	5	5	33	−28	

12 July 2015; 19:00	Canada	10–5	Mexico	President’s Choice Ajax Pan Am Ballpark, Ajax; Attendance: 1,243
12 July 2015; 19:00		Boxscore		President’s Choice Ajax Pan Am Ballpark, Ajax; Attendance: 1,243

13 July 2015; 14:00	Mexico	5–3	Argentina	President’s Choice Ajax Pan Am Ballpark, Ajax; Attendance: 220
13 July 2015; 14:00		Boxscore		President’s Choice Ajax Pan Am Ballpark, Ajax; Attendance: 220

14 July 2015; 16:30	Dominican Republic	2–4	Mexico	President’s Choice Ajax Pan Am Ballpark, Ajax; Attendance: 363
14 July 2015; 16:30		Boxscore		President’s Choice Ajax Pan Am Ballpark, Ajax; Attendance: 363

15 July 2015; 14:00	Venezuela	5–1	Mexico	President’s Choice Ajax Pan Am Ballpark, Ajax; Attendance: 215
15 July 2015; 14:00		Boxscore		President’s Choice Ajax Pan Am Ballpark, Ajax; Attendance: 215

16 July 2015; 19:00	Mexico	1–2	United States	President’s Choice Ajax Pan Am Ballpark, Ajax; Attendance: 89
16 July 2015; 19:00		Boxscore		President’s Choice Ajax Pan Am Ballpark, Ajax; Attendance: 89

== Squash ==
Mexico has qualified a full team of 6 athletes (3 men and 3 women).

Men
Athlete	Event	Round of 32	Round of 16	Quarterfinals	Semifinal	Final	
Athlete	Event	Opposition Score	Opposition Score	Opposition Score	Opposition Score	Opposition Score	Result
César Salazar	Singles	N Caballero (PAR); W 3 - 0					
Arturo Salazar	Singles	Leandro Romiglio (ARG); L 2 - 3	Did not advance				
	Doubles	—N/a	—N/a				

Athletes	Event	Preliminaries Group Stage			Quarterfinal	Semifinal	Final
Athletes	Event	Opposition Result	Opposition Result	Opposition Result	Opposition Result	Opposition Result	Opposition Result
César Salazar; Arturo Salazar; Eric Gálvez	Team						

Women
Athlete	Event	Round of 32	Round of 16	Quarterfinals	Semifinal	Final	
Athlete	Event	Opposition Score	Opposition Score	Opposition Score	Opposition Score	Opposition Score	Result
Samantha Terán	Singles	K González (COL); W 3 - 0					
Karla Urrutia	Singles	T Serafini (BRA); L 3 – 0					
Samantha Terán	Doubles	—N/a	—N/a				

Athletes	Event	Preliminaries Group Stage			Quarterfinal	Semifinal	Final
Athletes	Event	Opposition Result	Opposition Result	Opposition Result	Opposition Result	Opposition Result	Opposition Result
Samantha Terán; Diana García; Karla Urrutia	Team						

== Table tennis ==
Mexico has qualified a men's and women's team.

Men
Athlete	Event	Group Stage				Round of 32	Round of 16	Quarterfinals	Semifinals	Final / BM	
Athlete	Event	Opposition Result	Opposition Result	Opposition Result	Rank	Opposition Result	Opposition Result	Opposition Result	Opposition Result	Opposition Result	Rank
Marcos Madrid	Singles										
Miguel Ángel Lara	Singles										
José Ricardo Villa	Singles										
Marcos Madrid; Miguel Ángel Lara; José Ricardo Villa	Team					—N/a					

Women
Athlete	Event	Group Stage				Round of 32	Round of 16	Quarterfinals	Semifinals	Final / BM	
Athlete	Event	Opposition Result	Opposition Result	Opposition Result	Rank	Opposition Result	Opposition Result	Opposition Result	Opposition Result	Opposition Result	Rank
Yadira Silva	Singles										
Mónica Serrano	Singles										
Mercedes Madrid	Singles										
Yadira Silva; Mónica Serrano; Mercedes Madrid	Team					—N/a					

== Taekwondo ==
Mexico has qualified a full team of eight athletes (four men and four women).

Men
Athlete	Event	Round of 16	Quarterfinals	Semifinals	Repechage	Bronze Medal	Final	
Athlete	Event	Opposition Result	Opposition Result	Opposition Result	Opposition Result	Opposition Result	Opposition Result	Rank
Carlos Navarro	Men's -58kg							
Saúl Gutiérrez	Men's -68kg							
René Lizárraga	Men's -80kg							
Misael López	Men's +80kg							

Women
Athlete	Event	Round of 16	Quarterfinals	Semifinals	Repechage	Bronze Medal	Final	
Athlete	Event	Opposition Result	Opposition Result	Opposition Result	Opposition Result	Opposition Result	Opposition Result	Rank
Itzel Manjarrez	Women's -49kg							
Paulina Armería	Women's -57kg							
Victoria Heredia	Women's -67kg							
María Espinoza	Women's +67kg							

== Tennis ==
Brazil has qualified a full team of six athletes (three men and three women).

Men
Athlete	Event	1st Round	Round of 32	Round of 16	Quarterfinals	Semifinals	Final
Athlete	Event	Opposition Score	Opposition Score	Opposition Score	Opposition Score	Opposition Score	Opposition Score
Hans Hach	Singles	J-Y Aubone (USA); L 6 – 3, 1 – 6, 3 – 6	Did not advance				
Luis Patiño	Singles	W González (GUA); L 3 – 6, 1 – 6	Did not advance				
Manuel Sánchez	Singles	C Díaz Figueroa (GUA); L 4 – 6, 2 – 6	Did not advance				
Hans Hach; Luis Patiño	Doubles						

Women
Athlete	Event	Round of 32	Round of 16	Quarterfinals	Semifinals	Final
Athlete	Event	Opposition Score	Opposition Score	Opposition Score	Opposition Score	Opposition Score
Marcela Zacarías	Singles	A Koch (CHI); W 6 – 4, 6 – 0				
Victoria Rodríguez	Singles					
Ana Sofía Sánchez	Singles					
Victoria Rodríguez; Marcela Zacarías	Doubles					

Mixed
Athlete	Event	Round of 16	Quarterfinals	Semifinals	Final
Athlete	Event	Opposition Score	Opposition Score	Opposition Score	Opposition Score
Ana Sofía Sánchez; Manuel Sánchez	Doubles				

== Triathlon ==
Mexico qualified a full team of three men and three women, for a total of six athletes.

Men
Athlete	Event	Swim (1.5 km)	Trans 1	Bike (40 km)	Trans 2	Run (10 km)	Total	Rank
Crisanto Grajales	Men's individual	18.53	0:22	58:21	0:22	30:57	1:48:58	1st place, gold medalist(s)
Irving Pérez	Men's individual	18:46	0:24	58:28	0:21	31:05	1:49:05	3rd place, bronze medalist(s)
Rodrigo González	Men's individual	19:07	0:23	58:09	0:21	31:55	1:49:56	11

Women

Athlete	Event	Swim (1.5 km)	Trans 1	Bike (40 km)	Trans 2	Run (10 km)	Total	Rank
Claudia Rivas	Women's individual	19:01	0:33	1:02:02	0:23	DNF		
Cecilia Pérez	Women's individual	18:37	0:41	1:00:53	0:22	36:43	1:58:48	7
Paola Díaz	Women's individual	20:11	0:39	1:00:51	0:23	35:42	1:57:48	2nd place, silver medalist(s)

== Volleyball ==
=== Beach ===
Mexico has qualified a men's and women's pair for a total of four athletes.

Athlete	Event	Preliminary round			Quarterfinals	Semifinals	Finals	
Athlete	Event	Opposition Score	Opposition Score	Opposition Score	Opposition Score	Opposition Score	Opposition Score	Rank
Juan Virgen; Lombardo Ontiveros	Men's							
Bibiana Candelas; Martha Revuelta	Women's							

=== Indoors ===
Mexico has qualified a men's team of 12 athletes.

Men's tournament

Group B

Pos	Team	Pld	W	L	Pts	SPW	SPL	SPR	SW	SL	SR
1	Canada	3	3	0	12	280	249	1.124	9	3	3.000
2	Puerto Rico	3	2	1	10	268	248	1.081	7	4	1.750
3	United States	3	1	2	7	295	294	1.003	6	7	0.857
4	Mexico	3	0	3	1	195	247	0.789	1	9	0.111

Source: Archived 2016-03-04 at the Wayback Machine

17 July 2015; 19:05	Canada	3–0	Mexico	Exhibition Centre, Toronto; Attendance: 4,500
17 July 2015; 19:05	(25–18, 25–19, 25–18) result statistics			Exhibition Centre, Toronto; Attendance: 4,500

19 July 2015; 21:30	United States	3–1	Mexico	Exhibition Centre, Toronto; Attendance: 2,700
19 July 2015; 21:30	(20–25, 27–25, 25–16, 25–17) result statistics			Exhibition Centre, Toronto; Attendance: 2,700

21 July 2015; 15:47	Mexico	0–3	Puerto Rico	Exhibition Centre, Toronto; Attendance: 600
21 July 2015; 15:47	(23–25, 14–25, 20–25) result statistics			Exhibition Centre, Toronto; Attendance: 600

Seventh place match

24 July 2015; 13:35	Colombia	0–3	Mexico	Exhibition Centre, Toronto; Attendance: 3,500
24 July 2015; 13:35	(20–25, 17–25, 18–25) result statistics			Exhibition Centre, Toronto; Attendance: 3,500

2015 Pan American Games 7th place

Mexico

== Water polo ==
Mexico has qualified a men's and women's teams. Each team will consist of 13 athletes, for a total of 26.

=== Men's tournament ===
Roster

Mexico's team roster:

- Orlando Ortega
- Diego Marcado
- Jose Avalos
- Edgar O'Brien Jr
- Manuel Paniagua
- Pablo Carballo
- Oliver Alvarez
- Jose Serrano
- Armando Garcia
- Perseo Ponce
- Ever Resendiz
- Rodolfo Cervantes
- Alfredo De La Mora

Group B

Team	Pld	W	D	L	GF	GA	GD	Pts	Qualification
Brazil	3	3	0	0	55	20	+35	6	Qualified for the semifinals
Canada	3	2	0	1	44	22	+22	4	Qualified for the semifinals
Mexico	3	0	1	2	27	50	−23	1	
Venezuela	3	0	1	2	13	47	−34	1	

7 July 2015; 16:08	Report	Venezuela	9–9	Mexico	Markham Pan Am Centre; Referees: Mark Maretzki (USA), Reynel Castillo (PUR)
7 July 2015; 16:08	Report	Score by quarters: 3–1, 1–4, 3–2, 2–2			Markham Pan Am Centre; Referees: Mark Maretzki (USA), Reynel Castillo (PUR)
7 July 2015; 16:08	Report	Borges 3	Goals	Ponce 3	Markham Pan Am Centre; Referees: Mark Maretzki (USA), Reynel Castillo (PUR)

9 July 2015; 16:08	Report	Brazil	22–9	Mexico	Markham Pan Am Centre; Referees: Mark Maretzki (USA), Guillermo Grgicevic (ARG)
9 July 2015; 16:08	Report	Score by quarters: 3–3, 7–1, 4–2, 8–3			Markham Pan Am Centre; Referees: Mark Maretzki (USA), Guillermo Grgicevic (ARG)
9 July 2015; 16:08	Report	Gomes 7	Goals	Ponce 3	Markham Pan Am Centre; Referees: Mark Maretzki (USA), Guillermo Grgicevic (ARG)

11 July 2015; 18:08	Report	Mexico	9–19	Canada	Markham Pan Am Centre; Referees: Humberto Navarro (USA), Thomas Mulnar (HUN)
11 July 2015; 18:08	Report	Score by quarters: 0-2, 3-5, 3-5, 3-7			Markham Pan Am Centre; Referees: Humberto Navarro (USA), Thomas Mulnar (HUN)
11 July 2015; 18:08	Report	Alvarez 2	Goals	Boyd 5, Mcelroy Conway Bicari 3	Markham Pan Am Centre; Referees: Humberto Navarro (USA), Thomas Mulnar (HUN)

Crossover

13 July 2015; 14:00	Report	Mexico	17–7	Ecuador	Markham Pan Am Centre; Referees: Guillermo Grgicevic (ARG), William Mackay (CAN)
13 July 2015; 14:00	Report	Score by quarters: 3-3, 3-4, 6-0, 5-0			Markham Pan Am Centre; Referees: Guillermo Grgicevic (ARG), William Mackay (CAN)
13 July 2015; 14:00	Report	O'Brien Jr. 5	Goals	Kaltenbach 4	Markham Pan Am Centre; Referees: Guillermo Grgicevic (ARG), William Mackay (CAN)

Fifth place match

15 July 2015; 14:00	Report	Mexico	14–11	Venezuela	Markham Pan Am Centre; Referees: Reynel Castillo (PUR), Stéphane Roy (CAN)
15 July 2015; 14:00	Report	Score by quarters: 3-3, 4-2, 2-3, 5-3			Markham Pan Am Centre; Referees: Reynel Castillo (PUR), Stéphane Roy (CAN)
15 July 2015; 14:00	Report	Avalos 4	Goals	Perez Ribas 3	Markham Pan Am Centre; Referees: Reynel Castillo (PUR), Stéphane Roy (CAN)

=== Women's tournament ===
Roster

Group A

Team	Pld	W	D	L	GF	GA	GD	Pts	Qualification
United States	3	3	0	0	73	9	+64	6	Qualified for the semifinals
Cuba	3	2	0	1	24	30	−6	4	Qualified for the semifinals
Argentina	3	1	0	2	16	48	−32	2	
Mexico	3	0	0	3	20	46	−26	0	

7 July 2015; 10:08	Report	Mexico	3–25	United States	Markham Pan Am Centre; Referees: Hugo Paredes (ECU), João Cardenuto (BRA)
7 July 2015; 10:08	Report	Score by quarters: 0–6, 1–10, 0–7, 2–2			Markham Pan Am Centre; Referees: Hugo Paredes (ECU), João Cardenuto (BRA)
7 July 2015; 10:08	Report	Rios 2	Goals	Steffens, Grossman 4	Markham Pan Am Centre; Referees: Hugo Paredes (ECU), João Cardenuto (BRA)

8 July 2015; 08:08	Report	Mexico	8–10	Argentina	Markham Pan Am Centre; Referees: João Cardenuto (BRA), Reynel Castillo (PUR)
8 July 2015; 08:08	Report	Score by quarters: 1–2, 1–2, 3–2, 3–4			Markham Pan Am Centre; Referees: João Cardenuto (BRA), Reynel Castillo (PUR)
8 July 2015; 08:08	Report	Castro, Morales 2	Goals	M De Virgilio 4, Bertaina 2, Font 2, Hatcher 1, R De Virgilio 1	Markham Pan Am Centre; Referees: João Cardenuto (BRA), Reynel Castillo (PUR)

11 July 2015; 10:08	Report	Mexico	9–11	Cuba	Markham Pan Am Centre; Referees: Reynel Castillo (PUR), William Mackay (CAN)
11 July 2015; 10:08	Report	Score by quarters: 4-4, 2-1, 2-3, 1-3			Markham Pan Am Centre; Referees: Reynel Castillo (PUR), William Mackay (CAN)
11 July 2015; 10:08	Report	Murrieta 3	Goals	Ortiz 2	Markham Pan Am Centre; Referees: Reynel Castillo (PUR), William Mackay (CAN)

Crossover

12 July 2015; 14:00	Report	Mexico	10–8	Venezuela	Markham Pan Am Centre; Referees: Stéphane Roy (CAN), Edmundo Rodrigues (BRA)
12 July 2015; 14:00	Report	Score by quarters: 3-2, 3-2, 3-2, 2-1			Markham Pan Am Centre; Referees: Stéphane Roy (CAN), Edmundo Rodrigues (BRA)
12 July 2015; 14:00	Report	Castro 3	Goals	Hernandez Cabrera 3	Markham Pan Am Centre; Referees: Stéphane Roy (CAN), Edmundo Rodrigues (BRA)

Fifth place match

14 July 2015; 14:00	Report	Puerto Rico	12–11	Mexico	Markham Pan Am Centre; Referees: Juan Menendez (CUB), Diego Garibaldi (ARG)
14 July 2015; 14:00	Report	Score by quarters: 2–3, 4–3, 4–1, 2–4			Markham Pan Am Centre; Referees: Juan Menendez (CUB), Diego Garibaldi (ARG)
14 July 2015; 14:00	Report	Nazario 4	Goals	Castro 4	Markham Pan Am Centre; Referees: Juan Menendez (CUB), Diego Garibaldi (ARG)

Final Rank: 6th

== Water skiing ==
Mexico qualified a full team of 5 athletes. 4 in water skiing and 1 in wakeboarding.

=== Men ===
Athlete	Event	Preliminaries		Final	
Athlete	Event	Total	Rank	Total	Rank
Álvaro Lamadrid	Tricks				
Álvaro Lamadrid	Slalom				
Álvaro Lamadrid	Jump				
Carlos Lamadrid	Tricks				
Carlos Lamadrid	Slalom				
Carlos Lamadrid	Jump				
Sandro Ambrosi	Tricks				
Sandro Ambrosi	Slalom				
Sandro Ambrosi	Jump				
Jorge Alberto Pérez	Wakeboard				

=== Women ===
Athlete	Event	Preliminaries		Final	
Athlete	Event	Total	Rank	Total	Rank
Sandra Carolina Chapoy	Tricks				
Sandra Carolina Chapoy	Slalom				
Sandra Carolina Chapoy	Jump				

=== Overall ===
Athlete	Event	Final				
Athlete	Event	Tricks	Slalom	Jump	Total	Rank
Sandro Ambrosi	Men's overall					
Sandra Carolina Chapoy	Women's overall					

== Weightlifting ==
Mexico has qualified a team of 9 athletes (5 men and 4 women).

Athlete	Event	Snatch			Clean & Jerk			Total	Rank
Athlete	Event	Attempt 1	Attempt 2	Attempt 3	Attempt 1	Attempt 2	Attempt 3	Total	Rank
Antonio Vázquez	Men's 62 kg	115	~~120~~	120	155	~~163~~	~~163~~	275	5
	Men's 105 kg								
	Men's 105 kg								
	Men's +105 kg								
	Women's 48 kg								
	Women's 53 kg								
	Women's 63 kg								
	Women's 75 kg								

== Wrestling ==
Mexico qualified a team of 10 athletes (6 men and 4 women)

=== Men ===
==== Freestyle ====
Athlete	Event	Quarterfinals	Semifinals	Final
Athlete	Event	Opposition Result	Opposition Result	Opposition Result
	Men's 97 kg			

==== Greco-Roman ====
Athlete	Event	Quarterfinals	Semifinals	Final
Athlete	Event	Opposition Result	Opposition Result	Opposition Result
	Men's 59 kg			
	Men's 66 kg			
	Men's 75 kg			
	Men's 85 kg			
	Men's 98 kg			

=== Women ===
==== Freestyle ====
Athlete	Event	Quarterfinals	Semifinals	Final
Athlete	Event	Opposition Result	Opposition Result	Opposition Result
	Women's 53 kg			
	Women's 58 kg			
	Women's 69 kg			
	Women's 75 kg			

== See also ==
- Mexico at the 2016 Summer Olympics
