= Artistic swimming at the 2018 Central American and Caribbean Games =

Artistic swimming competition

- Venue: Complejo Acuático
- Location: (Colombia) Barranquilla
- Dates: 28 July – 2 August

The Synchronized swimming competition at the 2018 Central American and Caribbean Games was held in Barranquilla, Colombia from 28 July to 2 August at the Complejo Acuático.

== Medal summary ==
Event	Gold	Silver	Bronze
Solo Technical Routine	Joana Jiménez (MEX)	Mónica Arango (COL)	Kyra Hoevertsz (ARU)
Solo Free Routine	Nuria Diosdado (MEX)	Jennifer Cerquera (COL)	Kyra Hoevertsz (ARU)
Duet Technical Routine	Mexico (MEX); Nuria Diosdado; Karem Achach	Colombia (COL); Mónica Arango; Estefanía Álvarez	Venezuela (VEN); Lilia Núñez; Karla Loaiza
Duet Free Routine	Mexico (MEX); Nuria Diosdado; Karem Achach	Colombia (COL); Mónica Arango; Estefanía Álvarez	Aruba (ARU); Kyra Hoevertsz; Abigail Veer
Team Technical Routine	Mexico (MEX); Karem Achach; Teresa Alonso; Amaya Velázquez; Jessica Sobrino; Joana Jiménez; Luisa Rodríguez; Regina Alférez; Ana Soto	Colombia (COL); Estefanía Álvarez; Jennifer Cerquera; Juliana Jaramillo; Mónica Arango; Ingrid Cubillos; Jhoselyn Taborda; Sara Rodríguez; Viviana Valle	Venezuela (VEN); Lilia Núñez; Nicolle Salazar; Sandry Navarro; Yolexys Rodríguez; Sharon Bastardo; Naigeris Sánchez; Anastasia Roque; Karla Loaiza
Team Free Routine	Mexico (MEX); Nuria Diosdado; Joana Jiménez; Luisa Rodríguez; Regina Alférez; Karem Achach; Teresa Alonso; Amaya Velázquez; Jessica Sobrino	Colombia (COL); Estefanía Álvarez; Mónica Arango; Jennifer Cerquera; Viviana Valle; Ingrid Cubillos; Juliana Jaramillo; Jhoselyn Taborda; Sara Rodríguez	Venezuela (VEN); Lilia Núñez; Sandry Navarro; Naigeris Sánchez; Úrsula Alvarez; Sharon Bastardo; Nicolle Salazar; Anastasia Roque; Karla Loaiza
Team Free Routine Combination	Mexico (MEX); Nuria Diosdado; Joana Jiménez; Luisa Rodríguez; Regina Alférez; Ana Soto; Karem Achach; Teresa Alonso; Amaya Velázquez; Jessica Sobrino; Wendy Mayor	Colombia (COL); Estefanía Álvarez; Jennifer Cerquera; Juliana Jaramillo; Sara Rodríguez; Viviana Valle; Ingrid Cubillos; Jhoselyn Taborda; Mónica Arango; Valentina Orozco; Kerly Barrera	Venezuela (VEN); Lilia Núñez; Sandry Navarro; Naigeris Sánchez; Úrsula Alvarez; Yolexys Rodríguez; Sharon Bastardo; Nicolle Salazar; Anastasia Roque; Karla Loaiza

== Medal table ==
* Host nation (Host country)

Rank	Nation	Gold	Silver	Bronze	Total
1	Mexico	7	0	0	7
2	Colombia*	0	7	0	7
3	Venezuela	0	0	4	4
4	Aruba	0	0	3	3
Totals (4 entries)		7	7	7	21
