= Synchronized swimming at the 2015 Pan American Games – Qualification =

== Qualification system ==
A total of 80 synchronized swimmers will qualify to compete at the games. 8 teams of nine athletes (including one reserve) along with an additional four duets will qualify to compete at the games. The host nation is automatically qualified with a team of nine athletes. A NOC may enter a maximum of nine athletes, if it has qualified a team and two athletes if it has qualified only a duet.

Canada as host nation and the United States, as being the only member located in zone 3 automatically qualify a full team. The South American region and the Central American and Caribbean region will qualify three teams and five duets each. Therefore, a total of eight teams and twelve duets will qualify. All countries qualifying a team will also qualify a duet, the pair most consist of two athletes that compete in the team event.

== Qualification timeline ==
Event	Date	Venue
2014 South American Aquatics Championships	October 8–11, 2014	(Argentina) Mar del Plata
2014 Central American and Caribbean Games	November 15–21, 2014	(Mexico) Veracruz

== Qualification summary ==
NOC	Team	Duet	Athletes
Argentina	X	X	9
Aruba	X	X	9
Brazil	X	X	9
Canada	X	X	9
Chile		X	2
Colombia		X	2
Costa Rica		X	2
Cuba	X	X	9
Guatemala		X	2
Mexico	X	X	9
Peru	X		9
United States	X	X	9
Venezuela		X	2
Total: 13 NOC's	8	12	82

== Team ==
Competition	Vacancies	Qualified
Host nation	1	Canada
Qualified automatically	1	United States
2014 South American Championships	3	Brazil; Argentina; ~~Colombia~~; Peru
2014 Central American and Caribbean Games	3	Mexico; Aruba; Cuba
Total	8	

== Duet ==
Competition	Vacancies	Qualified
Host nation	1	Canada
Qualified automatically	1	United States
2014 South American Championships	3	Brazil; Argentina; Colombia
2014 South American Championships	2	Venezuela; Chile
2014 Central American and Caribbean Games	3	Mexico; Aruba; Cuba
2014 Central American and Caribbean Games	2	Costa Rica; ~~Puerto Rico~~; Guatemala
Total	12	
