= Artistic swimming at the 2023 Central American and Caribbean Games =

- Venue: Complejo Acuático El Polvorín
- Location: (El Salvador) San Salvador
- Dates: 24 – 28 June
- Competitors: 66 from 9 nations

The artistic swimming competition at the 2023 Central American and Caribbean Games will be held in San Salvador, El Salvador from 24 to 28 June at the Complejo Acuático El Polvorín.

== Participating nations ==
A total of 9 countries qualified athletes. The number of athletes a nation entered is in parentheses beside the name of the country.

- Aruba (9)
- Colombia (10)
- Costa Rica (3)
- Cuba (10)
- El Salvador (10)
- Centro Caribe Sports (3)
- Mexico (10)
- Panama (3)
- Puerto Rico (2)

== Medal table ==
* Host nation (El Salvador)

Rank	Nation	Gold	Silver	Bronze	Total
1	Mexico (MEX)	5	4	0	9
2	Colombia (COL)	4	3	2	9
3	Aruba (ARU)	0	2	4	6
4	Centro Caribe Sports (CCS)	0	0	1	1
4	El Salvador (ESA)*	0	0	1	1
4	Puerto Rico (PUR)	0	0	1	1
Totals (6 entries)		9	9	9	27

== Medal summary ==
=== Women's events ===
Event	Gold	Silver	Bronze
Solo Technical Routine	Mónica Arango (COL)	Joana Jiménez (MEX)	Kyra Hoevertsz (ARU)
Solo Free Routine	Nuria Diosdado (MEX)	Kyra Hoevertsz (ARU)	Mónica Arango (COL)
Duet Technical Routine	Mexico (MEX); Nuria Diosdado; Joana Jiménez	Colombia (COL); Estefanía Roa; Melisa Ceballos	Aruba (ARU); Mikayla Morales; Kyra Hoevertsz
Duet Free Routine	Mexico (MEX); Nuria Diosdado; Joana Jiménez	Aruba (ARU); Mikayla Morales; Kyra Hoevertsz	Colombia (COL); Estefanía Roa; Melisa Ceballos
Team Technical Routine	Colombia (COL); Isabella Franco; Sara Castañeda; Jhoselyne Taborda; Estefanía Roa; Valentina Orozco; Melisa Ceballos; Kerly Barrera; Mónica Arango	Mexico (MEX); Itzamary González; Jessica Sobrino; Nuria Diosdado; Daniela Estrada; Regina Alferez; Joana Jimenez; Glenda Inzunza; Pamela Toscano	Aruba (ARU); Emylaine Mathilda; Marayah Tromp; Angelina Hamoen; Mikayla Morales; Melanie Tromp; Kyra Hoevertsz; Meghan Tromp; Mariajose Salazar
Team Free Routine	Mexico (MEX); Itzamary González; Jessica Sobrino; Daniela Estrada; Regina Alferez; Luisa Rodriguez; Joana Jimenez; Glenda Inzunza; Pamela Toscano	Colombia (COL); Isabella Franco; Sara Castañeda; Jhoselyne Taborda; Estefanía Roa; Valentina Orozco; Melisa Ceballos; Kerly Barrera; Mónica Arango	El Salvador (ESA); Grecia Mendoza; Brandy Alvarado; Gabriela Moran; Gabriela Magana; Maria Agueta; Brigitte Guadron; Cesia Castaneda; Daira Sanchez

=== Mixed events ===
Event	Gold	Silver	Bronze
Mixed Duet Technical Routine	Colombia (COL); Gustavo Sánchez; Jennifer Cerquera	Mexico (MEX); Itzamary González; Diego Villalobos	Centro Caribe Sports (CCS); Rebeca Urías; Kevin García
Mixed Duet Free Routine	Mexico (MEX); Itzamary Gonzalez; Diego Villalobos	Colombia (COL); Gustavo Sánchez; Jennifer Cerquera	Puerto Rico (PUR); Nicolle Torrens; Javier Ruisanchez
Highlight Routine	Colombia (COL); Isabella Franco; Sara Castañeda; Estefanía Roa; Gustavo Sánchez; Melisa Ceballos; Kerly Barrera; Mónica Arango; Jennifer Cerquera	Mexico (MEX); Itzamary González; Jessica Sobrino; Nuria Diosdado; Daniela Estrada; Regina Alferez; Luisa Rodriguez; Glenda Inzunza; Pamela Toscano	Aruba (ARU); Emylaine Mathilda; Marayah Tromp; Angelina Hamoen; Mikayla Morales; Melanie Tromp; Kyra Hoevertsz; Meghan Tromp; Mariajose Salazar
