= Swimming at the 2015 Pan American Games – Men's 100 metre backstroke =

Men's 100 metre backstroke at the 2015 Pan American Games
- Venue: CIBC Pan Am/Parapan Am Aquatics Centre and Field House
- Dates: July 17 (preliminaries and finals)
- Competitors: 16 from 13 nations
- Winning time: 53.20

Medalists
Gold medal	Nick Thoman	United States
Silver medal	Guilherme Guido	Brazil
Bronze medal	Eugene Godsoe	United States

The men's 100 metre backstroke competition of the swimming events at the 2015 Pan American Games took place on July 17 at the CIBC Pan Am/Parapan Am Aquatics Centre and Field House in Toronto, Canada. The defending Pan American Games champion was Thiago Pereira of Brazil.

This race consisted of two lengths of the pool, both lengths in backstroke. The top eight swimmers from the heats would qualify for the A final (where the medals would be awarded), while the next best eight swimmers would qualify for the B final.

== Records ==
Prior to this competition, the existing world and Pan American Games records were as follows:

World record	Aaron Peirsol (USA)	51.94	Indianapolis, United States	July 8, 2009
Pan American Games record	Randall Bal (USA)	53.66	Rio de Janeiro, Brazil	July 22, 2007

The following new records were set during this competition.

Date	Event	Name	Nationality	Time	Record
17 July	A Final	Nick Thoman	United States	53.20	GR

== Qualification ==
Each National Olympic Committee (NOC) was able to enter up to two entrants providing they had met the A standard (56.59) in the qualifying period (January 1, 2014 to May 1, 2015). NOCs were also permitted to enter one athlete providing they had met the B standard (59.99) in the same qualifying period. All other competing athletes were entered as universality spots.

== Schedule ==
All times are Eastern Time Zone (UTC-4).

Date	Time	Round
July 17, 2015	10:18	Heats
July 17, 2015	19:18	Final B
July 17, 2015	19:24	Final A

== Results ==
KEY:	q	Fastest non-qualifiers	Q	Qualified	GR	Games record	NR	National record	PB	Personal best	SB	Seasonal best

=== Heats ===
The first round was held on July 17.

Rank	Heat	Lane	Name	Nationality	Time	Notes
1	2	4	Guilherme Guido	Brazil	54.04	QA
2	3	4	Nick Thoman	United States	54.35	QA
3	2	5	Eugene Godsoe	United States	54.38	QA
4	1	4	Russell Wood	Canada	54.55	QA
5	1	5	Federico Grabich	Argentina	54.87	QA
6	2	3	Omar Pinzón	Colombia	54.94	QA
7	1	3	Albert Subirats	Venezuela	55.24	QA
8	3	3	Markus Thormeyer	Canada	55.26	QA
9	3	6	Armando Barrera	Cuba	56.14	QB
10	3	2	Charles Hockin	Paraguay	56.56	QB
11	1	6	Robinson Molina	Venezuela	57.08	QB
12	1	2	Luis Martínez	Guatemala	57.22	QB
13	2	6	Daniel Torres	Mexico	57.38	QB
14	3	7	Timothy Winter	Jamaica	57.86	QB
15	2	2	Christopher Courtis	Barbados	58.15	QB
16	1	7	Matthew Mays	Virgin Islands	59.15	QB
	2	7	Jordan Augier	Saint Lucia		DNS
	3	5	Thiago Pereira	Brazil		DNS

=== B Final ===
The B final was also held on July 17.

Rank	Lane	Name	Nationality	Time	Notes
9	4	Armando Barrera	Cuba	56.14	
10	2	Daniel Torres	Mexico	56.91	
11	5	Charles Hockin	Paraguay	57.25	
12	6	Luis Martínez	Guatemala	57.30	
13	7	Timothy Winter	Jamaica	57.47	
14	3	Robinson Molina	Venezuela	57.92	
15	1	Christopher Courtis	Barbados	57.93	
16	8	Matthew Mays	Virgin Islands	59.14	

=== A Final ===
The A final was also held on July 17.

Rank	Lane	Name	Nationality	Time	Notes
1st place, gold medalist(s)	5	Nick Thoman	United States	53.20	GR
2nd place, silver medalist(s)	4	Guilherme Guido	Brazil	53.35	
3rd place, bronze medalist(s)	3	Eugene Godsoe	United States	53.96	
4	6	Russell Wood	Canada	54.30	
5	2	Federico Grabich	Argentina	54.61	
6	7	Omar Pinzón	Colombia	55.22	
7	8	Markus Thormeyer	Canada	55.52	
8	1	Albert Subirats	Venezuela	56.09	
