= Synchronized swimming at the 2015 Pan American Games =

- Synchronized swimming pictogram for the games
- Venue: CIBC Pan Am/Parapan Am Aquatics Centre and Field House
- Dates: July 9–11
- No. of events: 2 (2 women)
- Competitors: 82 from 13 nations

Synchronized swimming competitions at the 2015 Pan American Games in Toronto was held from July 9 to 11 at the Toronto Pan Am Sports Centre (CIBC Pan Am/Parapan Am Aquatics Centre and Field House). Due to naming rights the arena will be known as the latter for the duration of the games. The competition was split into two events a duet event and team competition (open only to women). Due to Pan American Games being scheduled to be held roughly around the same time as the 2015 World Aquatics Championships scheduled for Kazan, Russia, the synchronized swimming events began the day before the opening ceremony (when events are traditionally not held until after the ceremony).

The highest placing duet (not already qualified) qualified for the 2016 Summer Olympics in Rio de Janeiro, Brazil.

== Competition schedule ==
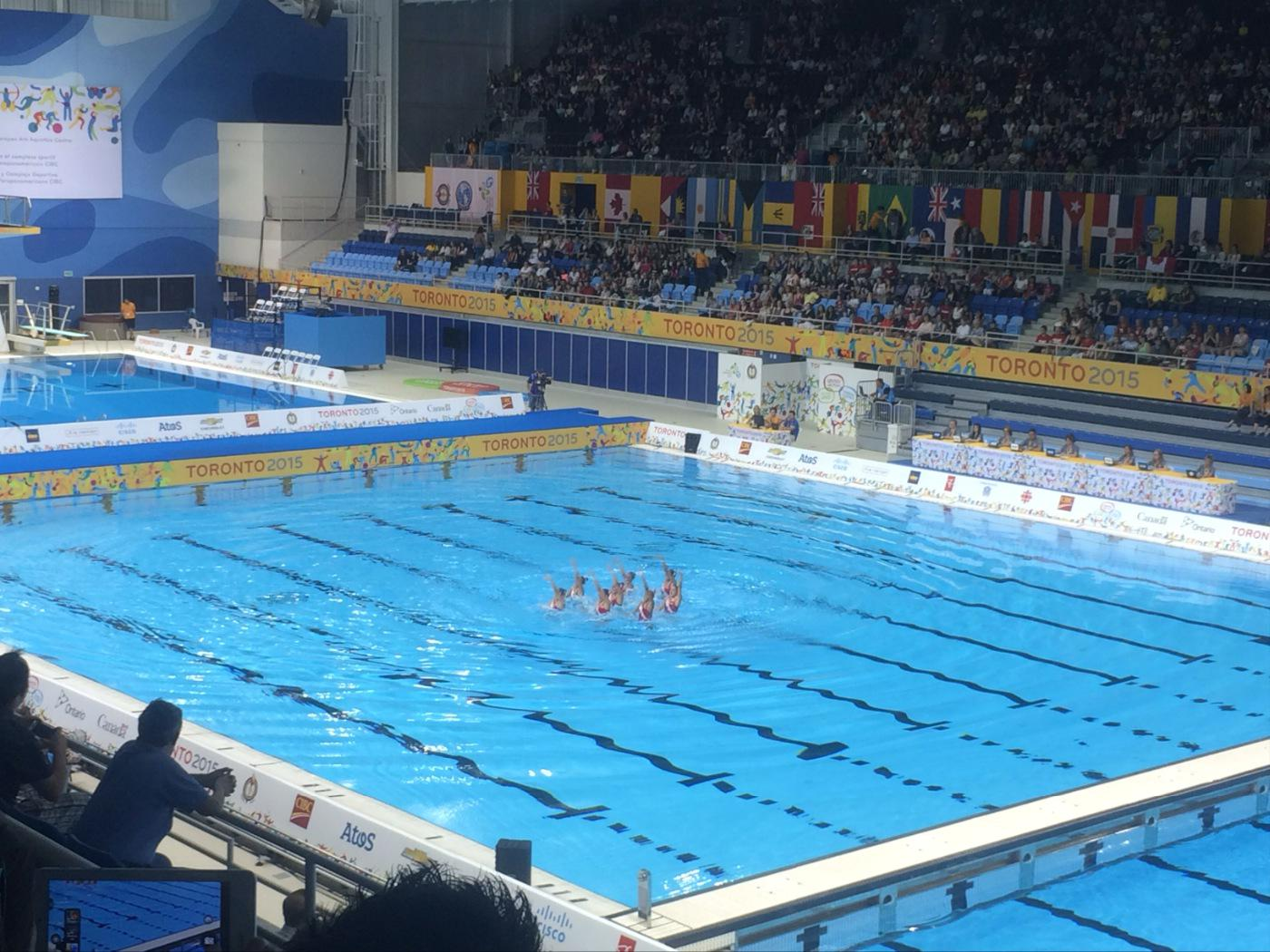
CIBC Pan Am/Parapan Am Aquatics Centre and Field House was the venue for the swimming competitions (pictured here during the competition.

The following is the competition schedule for the synchronized swimming competitions:

| T | Technical routine | F | Free routine |

| Event↓/Date → | Thu 9 | Sat 11 |
|---|---|---|
| Duet | T | F |
| Team | T | F |

== Medal table ==
* Host nation (Canada)

| Rank | Nation | Gold | Silver | Bronze | Total |
|---|---|---|---|---|---|
| 1 | Canada* | 2 | 0 | 0 | 2 |
| 2 | Mexico | 0 | 2 | 0 | 2 |
| 3 | United States | 0 | 0 | 2 | 2 |
| Totals (3 entries) | | 2 | 2 | 2 | 6 |

== Medalists ==
| Event | Gold | Silver | Bronze |
|---|---|---|---|
| Duet | Canada; Jacqueline Simoneau; Karine Thomas | Mexico; Karem Achach; Nuria Diosdado | United States; Mariya Koroleva; Alison Williams |
| Team | Canada; Gabriella Brisson; Annabelle Frappier; Claudia Holzner; Lisa Mikelberg; Marie-Lou Morin; Samantha Nealon; Jacqueline Simoneau; Karine Thomas | Mexico; Karem Achach; Karla Arreola; Isabel Delgado; Nuria Diosdado; Evelyn Guajardo; Joana Jimenez; Samantha Rodríguez; Jessica Sobrino | United States; Anita Alvarez; Claire Barton; Mary Killman; Mariya Koroleva; Sandra Ortellado; Sarah Rodríguez; Karensa Tjoa; Alison Williams |

== Participating nations ==
A total of 13 countries have qualified athletes. The number of athletes a nation has entered is in parentheses beside the name of the country.

- Argentina (9)
- Aruba (9)
- Brazil (9)
- Canada (9)
- Chile (2)
- Colombia (2)
- Costa Rica (2)
- Cuba (9)
- Guatemala (2)
- Mexico (9)
- Peru (8)
- United States (9)
- Venezuela (2)

== Qualification ==
A total of 80 synchronized swimmers qualified to compete at the games. 8 teams of nine athletes (including one reserve) along with an additional four duets qualified to compete at the games. The host nation is automatically qualified with a team of nine athletes. A NOC may enter a maximum of nine athletes, if it has qualified a team and two athletes if it has qualified only a duet.

== See also ==
- Synchronized swimming at the 2016 Summer Olympics
