= Artistic swimming at the 2019 Pan American Games – Qualification =

The following is the qualification system and qualified countries for the artistic swimming at the 2019 Pan American Games scheduled to be held in Lima, Peru.

== Qualification system ==
A total of 80 artistic swimmers will qualify to compete at the games. As host nation, Peru qualifies the maximum team size of nine athletes (eight athletes + a reserve). Seven other teams will qualify (each with nine athletes). Each team will also be required to compete in the duet event with athletes already qualified for the team event. A further four countries will qualify a duet only.

Canada and the United States, as being the only members located in zone 4 and zone 3 respectively, automatically qualify a full team. The South American region and the Central American and Caribbean region will qualify three teams and five duets each. Therefore, a total of eight teams and twelve duets will qualify.

== Qualification timeline ==
Event	Date	Venue
2018 Central American and Caribbean Games	July 28 – August 2, 2018	Barranquilla, Colombia
2018 South American Aquatics Championships	October 31 – November 3, 2018	Lima, Peru

== Qualification summary ==
A total of 12 NOC's qualified athletes.

NOC	Team	Duet	Athletes
Argentina		X	2
Aruba		X	2
Brazil	X	X	9
Canada	X	X	9
Chile		X	2
Colombia	X	X	9
Cuba	X	X	9
El Salvador		X	2
Guatemala	X	X	9
Mexico	X	X	9
Peru	X	X	9
United States	X	X	9
Total: 12 NOC's	8	12	80

== Team ==
Competition	Vacancies	Qualified
Host nation	1	Peru
Zone 3	1	United States
Zone 4	1	Canada
2018 Central American and Caribbean Games	3	Mexico; Cuba; Guatemala
2018 South American Championships	2	Brazil; Colombia
Total	8	

== Duet ==
Competition	Vacancies	Qualified
Host nation	1	Peru
Zone 3	1	United States
Zone 4	1	Canada
2018 Central American and Caribbean Games	3	Mexico; Cuba; Guatemala
2018 Central American and Caribbean Games	2	Aruba; El Salvador
2018 South American Championships	2	Colombia; Brazil
2018 South American Championships	2	Argentina; Chile
Total	12	
