= Isabel Delgado =

Mexican synchronized swimmer

Personal information
- National team: Mexico
- Born: 9 July 1987 (age 38) Mexico City, Mexico
- Height: 1.68 m (5 ft 6 in)
- Weight: 59 kg (130 lb)

Sport
- Sport: Synchronized swimming
- Club: Tijuca Tennis Club
Medal record
Representing Mexico
Pan American Games
Silver medal – second place	2015 Toronto	Team
Central American and Caribbean Games
Gold medal – first place	2006 Cartagena	Team
Gold medal – first place	2006 Cartagena	Team, combination
Gold medal – first place	2020 Mayagüez	Team, technical
Gold medal – first place	2014 Veracruz	Duet, free
Gold medal – first place	2014 Veracruz	Duet, technical
Gold medal – first place	2014 Veracruz	Team
Gold medal – first place	2014 Veracruz	Team, free
Silver medal – second place	2006 Cartagena	Duet
- Updated on 3 June 2024

Bianca Isabel Delgado Plancarte (born 9 July 1987) is a Mexican synchronized swimmer. She competed in the women's duet at both the 2008 and 2012 Summer Olympics. In 2008, she competed with Mariana Cifuentes, and in 2012 with Nuria Diosdado.
