= Clarissa Johnston =

South African synchronized swimmer

Personal information
- Nationality: South Africa
- Born: 14 November 1990 (age 34)

Sport
- Sport: Synchronized swimming
- Event: Women's duet

Clarissa Johnston (born 14 November 1990) is a South African synchronized swimmer. She competed in the 2020 Summer Olympics.
