= Estefanía Álvarez =

Colombian synchronized swimmer (born 1994)

Personal information
- Full name: Estefanía Álvarez Piedrahita
- Born: 25 August 1994 (age 31) Medellín, Colombia

Sport
- Sport: Synchronized swimming
Medal record
Representing Colombia
Central American and Caribbean Games
Silver medal – second place	2014 Veracruz	Duet, technical
Silver medal – second place	2014 Veracruz	Duet, free
Silver medal – second place	2014 Veracruz	Team, technical
Silver medal – second place	2014 Veracruz	Team, free
Silver medal – second place	2014 Veracruz	Team, free routine
Silver medal – second place	2018 Barranquilla	Duet, technical
Silver medal – second place	2018 Barranquilla	Duet, free
Silver medal – second place	2018 Barranquilla	Team, technical
Silver medal – second place	2018 Barranquilla	Team, free
Silver medal – second place	2018 Barranquilla	Team, free routine
- Updated on 7 June 2024

Estefanía Álvarez Piedrahita (born 25 August 1994) is a Colombian synchronized swimmer. She competed in the women's duet at the 2016 Summer Olympics.

She represented Colombia at the 2020 Summer Olympics.
