= Daniel Torres Samaniego =

Mexican swimmer

Daniel Torres
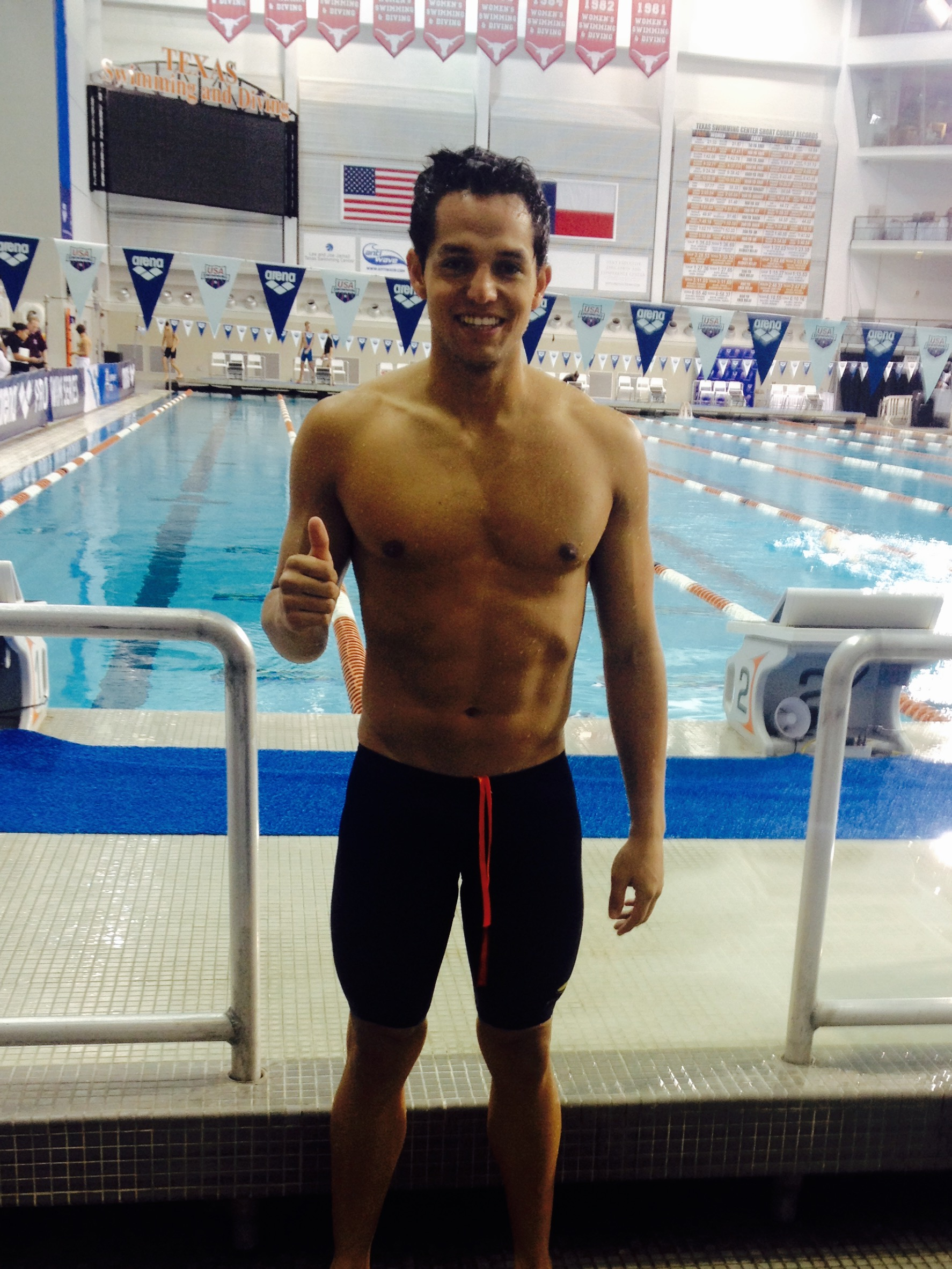
- Torres at the 2015 Arena Pro Swim Series in Austin

Personal information
- Full name: Daniel Torres Samaniego
- National team: Mexico
- Born: June 9, 1991 (age 35) Chihuahua, Mexico
- Height: 5 ft 9 in (1.75 m)
- Weight: 158 lb (72 kg)

Sport
- Sport: Swimming
- Strokes: Backstroke
- Club: Azura Florida Aquatics
- College team: University of the Incarnate Word

Daniel Torres Samaniego (born June 9, 1991) is a Mexican competition swimmer who specializes in the backstroke. He is the current Mexican record holder in the 50-meter backstroke.

== Career ==
Torres was born in Chihuahua, Mexico in 1991, the son of Gerardo Torres and Cristy Samaniego. He is a 2010 graduate of COBACH 3 high school and 2015 graduate of the University of the Incarnate Word, where he majored in international business. Swimming for the Incarnate Word Cardinals, he earned seven individual and four relay CSCAA All-American honors over two years at the NCAA Division-II level.

At the 2015 Pan American Games, Torres was a finalist in the 100-meter backstroke and as a member of the 4x100-meter medley relay.

== Personal bests ==
As of July 24, 2018.

Event	Time	Venue	Date	Note(s)
50 m backstroke (long course)	25.98	Barranquilla	July 24, 2018	NR
100 m backstroke (long course)	55.98	Toronto	April 6, 2016	
100 m butterfly (long course)	54.53	Toronto	April 9, 2016	

Key: NR = National record

== See also ==
- List of Mexican records in swimming
