= Mónica Arango =

Colombian synchronized swimmer (born 1992)

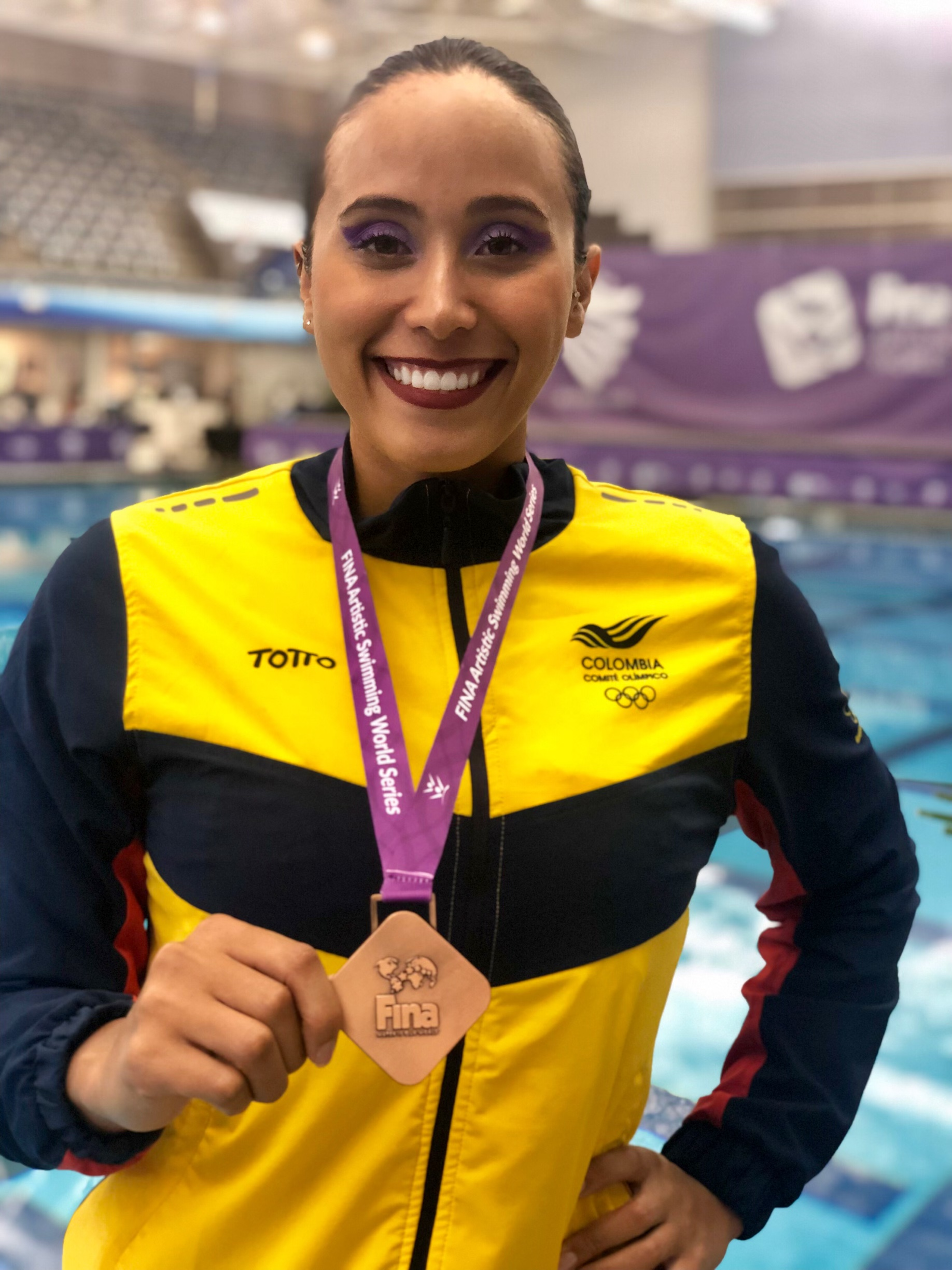
- Arango in 2019

Personal information
- Full name: Mónica Sarai Arango
- Nationality: Colombian
- Born: 5 June 1992 (age 34) Medellín, Colombia

Sport
- Sport: Synchronized swimming
Medal record
Women's artistic swimming
Representing Colombia
Central American and Caribbean Games
Gold medal – first place	2010 Mayagüez	Duet
Gold medal – first place	2010 Mayagüez	Team
Gold medal – first place	2010 Mayagüez	Team, free
Gold medal – first place	2023 San Salvador	Solo, technical
Gold medal – first place	2023 San Salvador	Team, technical
Gold medal – first place	2023 San Salvador	Mixed highlight
Silver medal – second place	2010 Mayagüez	Duet, free
Silver medal – second place	2010 Mayagüez	Team, technical
Silver medal – second place	2014 Veracruz	Solo, technical
Silver medal – second place	2014 Veracruz	Duet, free
Silver medal – second place	2014 Veracruz	Duet, technical
Silver medal – second place	2014 Veracruz	Team
Silver medal – second place	2014 Veracruz	Team, free
Silver medal – second place	2014 Veracruz	Team, technical
Silver medal – second place	2018 Barranquilla	Solo, technical
Silver medal – second place	2018 Barranquilla	Duet, free
Silver medal – second place	2018 Barranquilla	Duet, technical
Silver medal – second place	2018 Barranquilla	Team, free
Silver medal – second place	2018 Barranquilla	Team, technical
Silver medal – second place	2018 Barranquilla	Team, free
Silver medal – second place	2023 San Salvador	Team, free
Bronze medal – third place	2023 San Salvador	Solo, free

Mónica Sarai Arango Estrada (born 5 June 1992) is a Colombian synchronized swimmer. She competed in the women's duet at the 2020 Summer Olympics.
