= Karem Achach =

Mexican synchronized swimmer (born 1991)

Personal information
- Full name: Karem Faride Achach Ramírez
- Nationality: Mexico
- Born: 25 February 1991 (age 35) Mérida, Yucatán, Mexico
- Height: 1.69 m (5 ft 7 in)
- Weight: 60 kg (132 lb)

Sport
- Sport: Swimming
- Strokes: Synchronized swimming
- Club: Club Sincro Yucatan
- Coach: Adriana Loftus
Medal record
Synchronized swimming
Representing Mexico
Pan American Games
Silver medal – second place	2015 Toronto	Duet
Silver medal – second place	2015 Toronto	Team
- Updated on 15 August 2016

Karem Faride Achach Ramírez (Note: In this Spanish name, the first or paternal surname is Achach and the second or maternal family name is Ramírez.) (born 25 February 1991) is a Mexican synchronized swimmer. She collected a total of two silver medals each in both the women's duet and team routine at the 2015 Pan American Games in Toronto, and subsequently competed as a member of the Mexican delegation at the Summer Olympics in Rio de Janeiro by the following year. There, she and her London 2012 partner Nuria Diosdado scored 86.0667 to hand the Mexican duo an eleventh spot in the women's duet final with 170.9935 total points.
