= Joana Jiménez =

Mexican synchronized swimmer (born 1993)

Personal information
- Full name: Joana Betzabe Jiménez García
- Nationality: Mexico
- Born: 19 August 1993 (age 33) Ecatepec de Morelos, Mexico
- Height: 1.66 m (5 ft 5 in)

Sport
- Sport: Swimming
- Strokes: Synchronized swimming
Medal record
Artistic swimming
Representing Mexico
Pan American Games
Gold medal – first place	2023 Santiago	Women's duet
Gold medal – first place	2023 Santiago	Women's team
Silver medal – second place	2015 Toronto	Women's team
Silver medal – second place	2019 Lima	Women's duet
Silver medal – second place	2019 Lima	Women's team
Central American and Caribbean Games
Gold medal – first place	2014 Veracruz	Team technical routine
Gold medal – first place	2014 Veracruz	Team free routine
Gold medal – first place	2014 Veracruz	Combination
Gold medal – first place	2018 Barranquilla	Solo technical routine
Gold medal – first place	2018 Barranquilla	Team technical routine
Gold medal – first place	2018 Barranquilla	Team free routine
Gold medal – first place	2018 Barranquilla	Combination
Gold medal – first place	2023 San Salvador	Duet technical routine
Gold medal – first place	2023 San Salvador	Duet free routine
Gold medal – first place	2023 San Salvador	Team free routine
Gold medal – first place	2026 Santo Domingo	Duet technical routine
Gold medal – first place	2026 Santo Domingo	Team acrobatic routine
Gold medal – first place	2026 Santo Domingo	Team free routine
Gold medal – first place	2026 Santo Domingo	Team technical routine
Silver medal – second place	2023 San Salvador	Solo technical routine
Silver medal – second place	2023 San Salvador	Team technical routine
Silver medal – second place	2026 Santo Domingo	Duet free routine

Joana Betzabe Jiménez García (Note: In this Spanish name, the first or paternal surname is Jiménez and the second or maternal family name is García.) (born 19 August 1993) is a Mexican synchronized swimmer.

Jiménez has competed in the Pan American Games four times since 2011 and has won five medals, including two gold medals. She has competed in the Central American and Caribbean Games four times since 2014, where she has more success and has won seventeen medals, including fourteen gold medals. She also competed at the World Aquatic Championships nine times and the Olympic Games twice.

== Career ==
In November 2014, Jiménez competed in the Central American and Caribbean Games held in Veracruz, where she won three gold medals. She then competed in the 2015 Pan American Games held in Toronto, where she was part of the Mexican team that won the silver medal.

Jiménez competed in the 2018 Central American and Caribbean Games held in Baranquilla, where she won four gold medals. Along with Nuria Diosdado, she won the silver medal at the 2019 Pan-American Games in the duet. She represented Mexico at the 2020 Summer Olympics with Diosdado.

In 2023, Jiménez competed in the Pan American Games, where she won a gold medal with Diosdado in the women's duet event and was part of the Mexican team that won gold. She then competed in the Central American and Caribbean Games where she won five medals, including three gold. At the 2024 Summer Olympics, she competed in the women's duet and team event.
