= Nuria Diosdado =

Mexican synchronized swimmer

Personal information
- Full name: Nuria Lidón Diosdado García
- Nationality: Mexico
- Born: 22 August 1990 (age 35) Guadalajara, Mexico
- Height: 1.69 m (5 ft 7 in)

Sport
- Sport: Swimming
- Strokes: Synchronized swimming
Medal record
Artistic swimming
Representing Mexico
Pan American Games
Gold medal – first place	2023 Santiago	Women's duet
Gold medal – first place	2023 Santiago	Women's team
Silver medal – second place	2019 Lima	Women's duet
Silver medal – second place	2019 Lima	Women's team
Central American and Caribbean Games
Gold medal – first place	2006 Cartagena	Team
Gold medal – first place	2006 Cartagena	Combination
Gold medal – first place	2010 Mayagüez	Solo technical routine
Gold medal – first place	2010 Mayagüez	Duet technical routine
Gold medal – first place	2010 Mayagüez	Team technical routine
Gold medal – first place	2010 Mayagüez	Solo free routine
Gold medal – first place	2010 Mayagüez	Duet free routine
Gold medal – first place	2010 Mayagüez	Team free routine
Gold medal – first place	2010 Mayagüez	Combination
Gold medal – first place	2014 Veracruz	Solo technical routine
Gold medal – first place	2014 Veracruz	Duet technical routine
Gold medal – first place	2014 Veracruz	Team technical routine
Gold medal – first place	2014 Veracruz	Solo free routine
Gold medal – first place	2014 Veracruz	Duet free routine
Gold medal – first place	2014 Veracruz	Combination
Gold medal – first place	2023 San Salvador	Solo free routine
Gold medal – first place	2023 San Salvador	Duet technical routine
Gold medal – first place	2023 San Salvador	Duet free routine
Silver medal – second place	2015 Toronto	Duet free routine
Silver medal – second place	2023 San Salvador	Team technical routine
Silver medal – second place	2023 San Salvador	Mixed highlight routine

Nuria Lidón Diosdado García (Note: In this Spanish name, the first or paternal surname is Diosdado and the second or maternal family name is García.) (born 22 August 1990) is a Mexican synchronized swimmer. She competed in the women's duet at the 2012 Olympic Games (with Isabel Delgado) and at the 2016 Olympics (with Karem Achach).

Born in Guadalajara, Diosdado took up synchronised swimming at the age of 5 and began to compete at the age of 8. She won silver medals in the duet (with Achach) and team events at the 2015 Pan-American Games. She repeated the feat at the 2019 Pan-American Games, this time with Joana Jiménez in the duet.

She has qualified to represent Mexico at the 2020 Summer Olympics with Joana Jiménez.

== Personal life ==
Diosdado married Spanish sport scientist Javier Arnáiz in 2021.
