= Central American and Caribbean Games =

Regional multisports championship event

Central American and Caribbean Games Juegos Centroamericanos y del Caribe
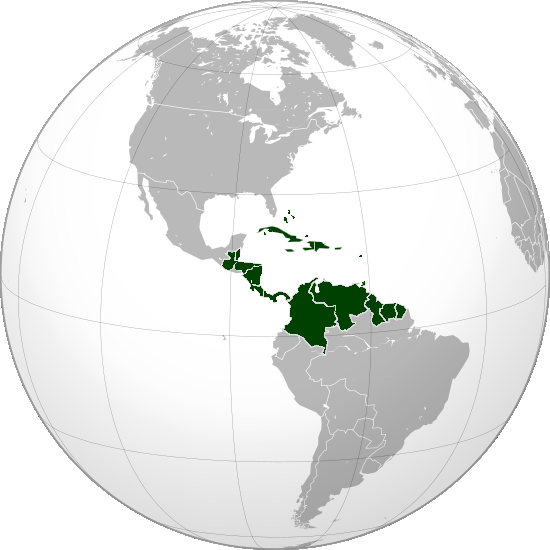
- Abbreviation: CACG
- Purpose: Sports for Central American and Caribbean people
- Frequency: Every 4 years
- Inaugurated: October 30 – November 2, 1926
- Most recent: July 24 – August 8, 2026
- Organization: Centro Caribe Sports

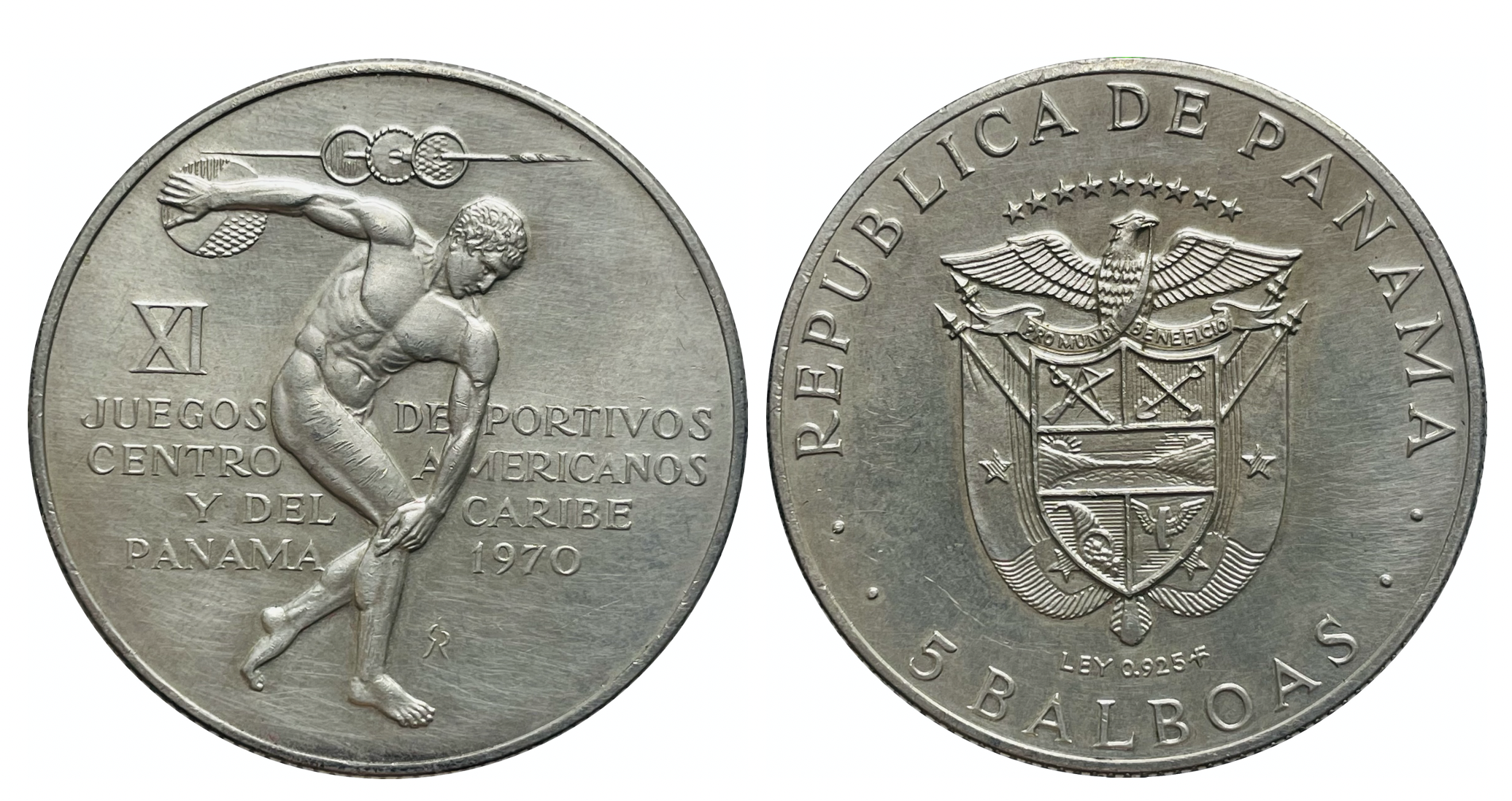
Silver coin: 5 Balboas, Panama - 11th Central American and Caribbean Games, 1970

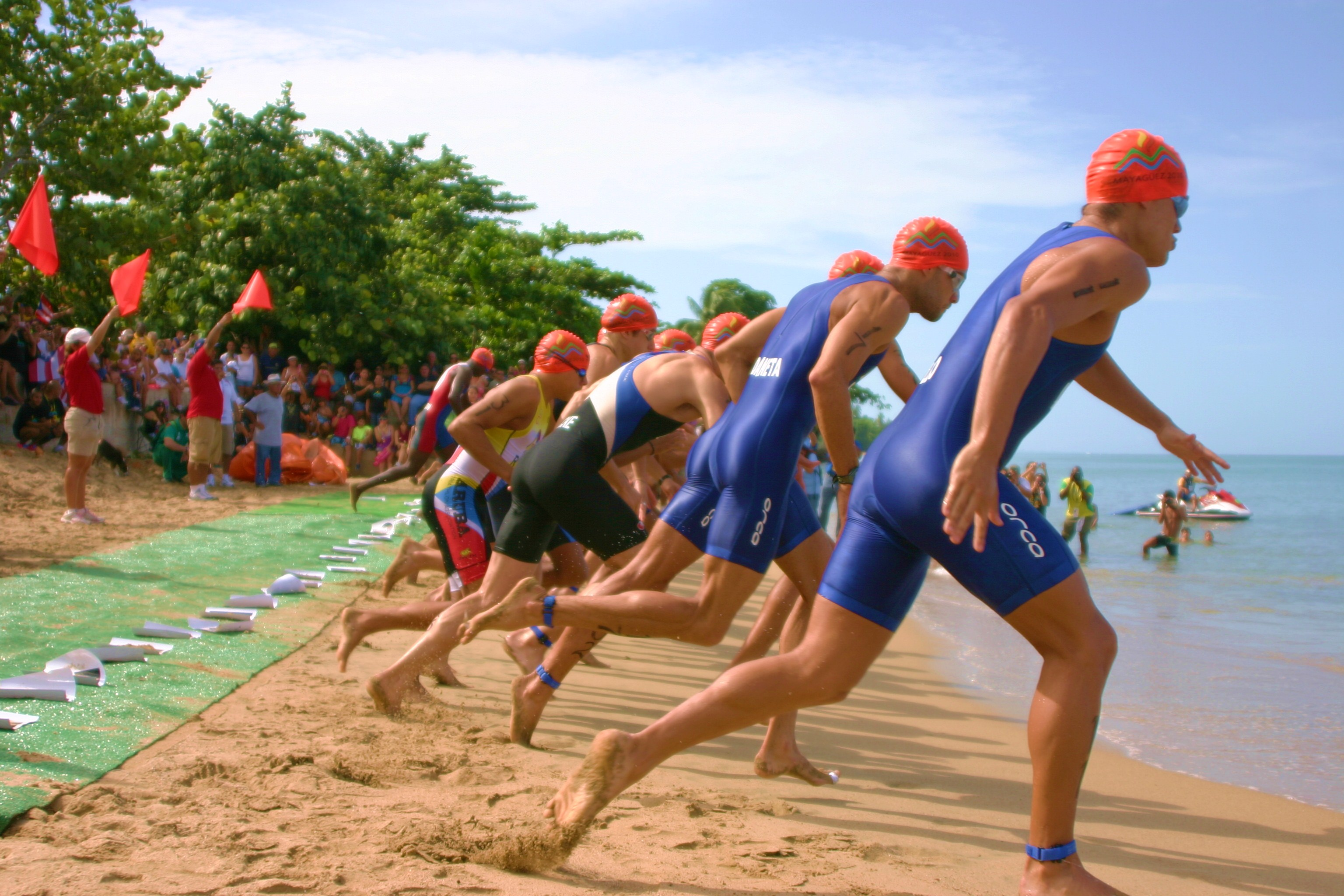
Central American and Caribbean Games 2010, Triathlon, in Mayagüez, Puerto Rico

The Central American and Caribbean Games (CAC or CACGs) are a regional multi-sport event held quadrennially, typically in the year midway between Summer Olympics. The games are contested by 32 countries and five territories in Central America and the Caribbean, including Mexico and the Caribbean South American countries of Colombia, Guyana, Suriname, and Venezuela.

The games are overseen by Centro Caribe Sports. They are designed to provide a step between sub-CACG-region Games held the first year following a Summer Olympics (e.g. Central American Games) and the Continental Championships, the Pan American Games, held the year before the Summer Olympics.

The last Games were held primarily in Santo Domingo, Dominican Republic in 2026.

== History ==
The CACGs are the oldest continuing regional games in the world, and only the Olympics have run longer. Mexico, Cuba and Guatemala were the three countries present at the first games, which were then called the Central American Games. In 1935 their name was changed to Central American and Caribbean Games to reflect expanding participation.

The 1942 edition was suspended after the impact of the World War II.

A "Central American Games" does exist today, Juegos Centroamericanos, involving just Central American countries.

== Editions ==
Host cities of the Central American and Caribbean Games

The first two editions of the Games were known as the "Central American Games" at the time, but the edition lineage continued after the inclusion of the Caribbean nations in 1935.

| Year | Edition | Host city | Host nation (as recognized by the IOC) | Dates | Nations | Events | Sports | Competitors | Top placed team |
|---|---|---|---|---|---|---|---|---|---|
| 1926 | 1 | Mexico City | Mexico | October 30 – November 2 | 3 | 39 | 8 | 269 | Mexico |
| 1930 | 2 | Havana | Cuba | March 15 – April 15 | 9 | 44 | 10 | 596 | Cuba |
| 1935 | 3 | San Salvador | El Salvador | March 16 – April 5 | 9 | 79 | 14 | 741 | Mexico |
| 1938 | 4 | Panama City | Panama | February 5 – February 24 | 10 | 96 | 17 | 1216 | Mexico |
| 1946 | 5 | Barranquilla | Colombia | March 5 – March 25 | 13 | 107 | 18 | 1540 | Mexico |
| 1950 | 6 | Guatemala City | Guatemala | February 28 – March 12 | 14 | 115 | 19 | 1390 | Mexico |
| 1954 | 7 | Mexico City | Mexico | March 5 – March 20 | 12 | 122 | 19 | 1356 | Mexico |
| 1959 | 8 | Caracas | Venezuela | January 6 – January 15 | 12 | 118 | 17 | 1150 | Mexico |
| 1962 | 9 | Kingston | Jamaica | August 15 – August 28 | 15 | 112 | 17 | 1559 | Mexico |
| 1966 | 10 | San Juan | Puerto Rico | July 11 – July 25 | 18 | 137 | 17 | 1689 | Mexico |
| 1970 | 11 | Panama City | Panama | February 28 – March 13 | 21 | 182 | 16 | 2095 | Cuba |
| 1974 | 12 | Santo Domingo | Dominican Republic | February 27 – March 13 | 23 | 171 | 18 | 1928 | Cuba |
| 1978 | 13 | Medellín | Colombia | July 7 – July 28 | 19 | 188 | 21 | 2605 | Cuba |
| 1982 | 14 | Havana | Cuba | August 7 – August 18 | 22 | 246 | 24 | 2799 | Cuba |
| 1986 | 15 | Santiago de los Caballeros | Dominican Republic | June 24 – July 5 | 26 | 288 | 25 | 2963 | Cuba |
| 1990 | 16 | Mexico City | Mexico | November 20 – December 3 | 29 | 359 | 30 | 4206 | Cuba |
| 1993 | 17 | Ponce | Puerto Rico | November 19 – November 30 | 31 | 385 | 33 | 3570 | Cuba |
| 1998 | 18 | Maracaibo | Venezuela | August 8 – August 22 | 31 | 376 | 30 | 5200 | Cuba |
| 2002 | 19 | San Salvador | El Salvador | November 19 – November 30 | 31 | 435 | 38 | 4301 | Mexico |
| 2006 | 20 | Cartagena | Colombia | July 15 – July 30 | 32 | 449 | 37 | 4865 | Cuba |
| 2010 | 21 | Mayagüez | Puerto Rico | July 17 – August 1 | 31 | 492 | 42 | 5204 | Mexico |
| 2014 | 22 | Veracruz | Mexico | November 14 – November 30 | 31 | 427 | 36 | 5707 | Cuba |
| 2018 | 23 | Barranquilla | Colombia | July 19 – August 3 | 37 | 470 | 36 | 5854 | Mexico |
| 2023 | 24 | San Salvador | El Salvador | June 23 – July 8 | 35 | 434 | 38 | 5377 | Mexico |
| 2026 | 25 | Santo Domingo | Dominican Republic | July 24 – August 8 | 37 | 483 | 40 | 6000+ | |

== Sports ==
| Sport | 1926 | 1930 | 1935 | 1938 | 1946 | 1950 | 1954 | 1959 | 1962 | 1966 | 1970 | 1974 | 1978 | 1982 | 1986 | 1990 | 1993 | 1998 | 2002 | 2006 | 2010 | 2014 | 2018 | 2023 | 2026 |
|---|---|---|---|---|---|---|---|---|---|---|---|---|---|---|---|---|---|---|---|---|---|---|---|---|---|
| Archery | | | | | | | | | | | | | | X | X | X | X | X | X | X | X | X | X | X | X |
| Athletics | X | X | X | X | X | X | X | X | X | X | X | X | X | X | X | X | X | X | X | X | X | X | X | X | X |
| Artistic swimming | | | | | | | | | | | | | X | X | X | X | X | X | X | X | X | X | X | X | X |
| Badminton | | | | | | | | | | | | | | | | X | | | X | X | X | X | X | X | X |
| Baseball | X | X | X | X | X | X | X | X | X | X | X | X | X | X | X | X | X | X | X | X | X | X | X | X | X |
| Basketball | X | X | X | X | X | X | X | X | X | X | X | X | X | X | X | X | X | X | X | X | X | X | X | X | X |
| Basque pelota | | | | X | X | | | | | | | | | | | | | | | | | X | | | |
| Beach volleyball | | | | | | | | | | | | | | | | | | X | X | X | X | X | X | X | X |
| Bowling | | | | | | X | X | | | | | | | | | X | X | X | X | X | X | X | X | X | X |
| Boxing | | | X | X | X | X | X | X | X | X | X | X | X | X | X | X | X | X | X | X | X | X | X | X | X |
| Canoeing | | | | | | | | | | | | | | | | X | X | | X | X | X | X | X | X | X |
| Chess | | | | | | | | | | | | | | | | | | | | | | | | X | X |
| Cycling | | | | X | X | X | X | X | X | X | X | X | X | X | X | X | X | X | X | X | X | X | X | X | X |
| Diving | X | X | X | X | X | X | X | X | X | X | X | X | X | X | X | X | X | | X | X | X | X | X | X | X |
| Equestrian | | | X | X | | X | X | X | | | | | | | X | X | X | X | X | X | X | X | X | X | X |
| Esports | | | | | | | | | | | | | | | | | | | | | | | | | X |
| Fencing | X | X | X | X | X | X | X | X | X | X | X | | X | X | X | X | X | X | X | X | X | X | X | X | X |
| Field hockey | | | | | | | | | | | | | | X | X | X | X | X | X | X | X | X | X | X | X |
| Football | | X | X | X | X | X | X | X | X | X | X | X | X | X | X | X | X | X | X | X | X | X | X | X | X |
| Golf | | | | X | X | X | X | X | | | | | | | | | | | | | | X | X | X | X |
| Artistic gymnastics | | | | | X | X | X | X | | | X | X | X | X | X | X | X | X | X | X | X | X | X | X | X |
| Rhythmic gymnastics | | | | | | | | | | | | | | | | | | X | X | X | X | X | X | X | X |
| Trampoline | | | | | | | | | | | | | | | | | | | | | X | X | X | X | X |
| Handball | | | | | | | | | | | | | | | | | X | | X | X | X | X | X | X | X |
| Judo | | | | | | | | | | X | X | X | X | X | X | X | X | X | X | X | X | X | X | X | X |
| Karate | | | | | | | | | | | | | | | | | X | X | X | X | X | X | X | X | X |
| Modern pentathlon | | | | | | | | | | | | | | | | | | | X | X | X | X | X | X | X |
| Netball | | | | | | | | | | | | | | | | | | | | | | | | X | X |
| Racquetball | | | | | | | | | | | | | | | | X | X | X | X | X | X | X | X | X | X |
| Roller skating | | | | | | | | | | | | | | | | | X | | X | X | X | X | X | | |
| Rowing | | | | | | | | | | | | | | X | X | X | X | X | X | X | X | X | X | X | X |
| Rugby | | | | | | | | | | | | | | | | | | | | | X | | | | |
| Rugby sevens | | | | | | | | | | | | | | | | | | | | | | X | X | X | X |
| Sailing | | | | | | | | | X | X | | X | | X | X | X | X | X | X | X | X | X | X | X | X |
| Shooting | X | X | X | X | X | X | X | X | X | X | X | X | X | X | X | X | X | X | X | X | X | X | X | X | X |
| Skateboarding | | | | | | | | | | | | | | | | | | | | | | | | | X |
| Softball | | | | | X | | | | | | | X | X | X | X | X | X | X | X | X | X | X | X | X | X |
| Squash | | | | | | | | | | | | | | | | | | | X | X | X | X | X | | X |
| Swimming | X | X | X | X | X | X | X | X | X | X | X | X | X | X | X | X | X | X | X | X | X | X | X | X | X |
| Table tennis | | | | | | | | | | | | | | X | X | X | X | X | X | X | X | X | X | X | X |
| Taekwondo | | | | | | | | | | | | | | | | X | X | X | X | X | X | X | X | X | X |
| Tennis | X | X | X | X | X | X | X | X | X | X | | X | X | X | X | X | X | X | X | X | X | X | X | X | X |
| Triathlon | | | | | | | | | | | | | | | | | | X | X | X | X | X | X | X | X |
| Volleyball | | X | X | X | X | X | X | X | X | X | X | X | X | X | X | X | X | X | X | X | X | X | X | X | X |
| Water polo | | | | X | X | X | X | X | X | X | X | X | X | X | X | X | X | X | X | X | X | X | X | X | X |
| Water ski | | | | | | | | | | | | | | | | | | | | X | X | | | | X |
| Weightlifting | | | | X | X | X | X | X | X | X | X | X | X | X | X | X | X | X | X | X | X | X | X | X | X |
| Wrestling | | | X | X | X | X | X | X | X | X | X | X | X | X | X | X | X | X | X | X | X | X | X | X | X |

== Nations ==
| Nation | 1926 | 1930 | 1935 | 1938 | 1946 | 1950 | 1954 | 1959 | 1962 | 1966 | 1970 | 1974 | 1978 | 1982 | 1986 | 1990 | 1993 | 1998 | 2002 | 2006 | 2010 | 2014 | 2018 | 2023 | 2026 |
|---|---|---|---|---|---|---|---|---|---|---|---|---|---|---|---|---|---|---|---|---|---|---|---|---|---|
| AHO | | | | | X | X | X | X | X | X | X | X | X | X | X | X | X | X | X | X | X | | | | |
| ARU | | | | | | | | | | | | | | | | X | X | X | X | X | X | X | X | X | X |
| ATG | | | | | | | | | | | | | | | X | X | X | X | X | X | X | X | X | X | X |
| BAH | | | | | | | | | X | X | X | X | X | X | X | X | X | X | X | X | X | X | X | X | X |
| BAR | | | | | | | | | X | X | X | X | X | X | X | X | X | X | X | X | X | X | X | X | X |
| BER | | | | | | | | | | | | X | X | X | X | X | X | X | X | X | X | X | X | X | X |
| BIZ | | | | | | | | | | | X | X | X | X | X | X | X | X | X | X | X | X | X | X | X |
| IVB | | | | | | | | | | | | | | X | X | X | X | X | X | X | X | X | X | X | X |
| CAY | | | | | | | | | | | | | | | X | X | X | X | X | X | X | X | X | X | X |
| COL | | | | X | X | X | X | X | X | X | X | X | X | | X | X | X | X | X | X | X | X | X | X | X |
| CCS | | | | | | | | | | | | | | | | | | | | | | | | X | |
| CRC | | X | X | X | X | X | | X | | X | X | X | X | X | X | X | X | X | X | X | X | X | X | X | X |
| CUB | X | X | X | X | X | X | X | | X | X | X | X | X | X | X | X | X | X | | X | | X | X | X | X |
| CUW | | | | | | | | | | | | | | | | | | | | | | | X | X | X |
| DMA | | | | | | | | | | | | | | | | | | X | X | X | X | X | X | X | X |
| DOM | | | | | X | | X | | X | X | X | X | X | X | X | X | X | X | X | X | X | X | X | X | X |
| ESA | | X | X | X | X | X | X | X | X | X | X | X | X | | X | X | X | X | X | X | X | X | X | X | X |
| GRN | | | | | | | | | | | | | | X | | X | X | X | X | X | X | X | X | X | X |
| GUA | X | X | X | | X | X | X | X | X | X | X | X | X | X | X | X | X | X | X | X | X | X | X | | X |
| GUF | | | | | | | | | | | | | | | | | | | | | | | X | | X |
| GUY | | | | | | | | X | X | X | X | X | | X | X | X | X | X | X | X | X | X | X | X | X |
| HAI | | | | | | X | | | | | | X | X | X | X | X | X | X | X | X | X | X | X | X | X |
| HON | | X | X | | | X | | | | | | X | | X | X | X | X | X | X | X | X | X | X | X | X |
| ISV | | | | | | | | | | X | X | X | X | X | X | X | X | X | X | X | X | X | X | X | X |
| JAM | | X | | X | X | X | X | X | X | X | X | X | X | X | X | X | X | X | X | X | X | X | X | X | X |
| LCA | | | | | | | | | | | | | | | | | X | X | X | X | X | X | X | X | X |
| MEX | X | X | X | X | X | X | X | X | X | X | X | X | X | X | X | X | X | X | X | X | X | X | X | X | X |
| NCA | | | X | X | | X | X | X | | X | X | X | X | X | X | X | X | X | X | X | X | X | X | X | X |
| PAN | | X | X | X | X | X | X | X | X | X | X | X | X | X | X | X | X | X | X | X | X | X | X | X | X |
| PUR | | X | X | X | X | X | X | X | X | X | X | X | X | X | X | X | X | X | X | X | X | X | X | X | X |
| SKN | | | | | | | | | | | | | | | | | X | X | X | X | X | X | X | X | X |
| SXM | | | | | | | | | | | | | | | | | | | | | | | X | | X |
| SUR | | | | | | | | | | | X | X | X | X | X | X | X | X | X | X | X | X | X | X | X |
| TRI | | | | | X | X | | | X | X | X | X | X | X | X | X | X | X | X | X | X | X | X | X | X |
| VIN | | | | | | | | | | | | | | | | X | X | X | X | X | X | X | X | X | X |
| VEN | | | | X | X | | X | X | X | X | X | X | X | X | X | X | X | X | X | X | X | X | X | X | X |

== Historical medal count ==
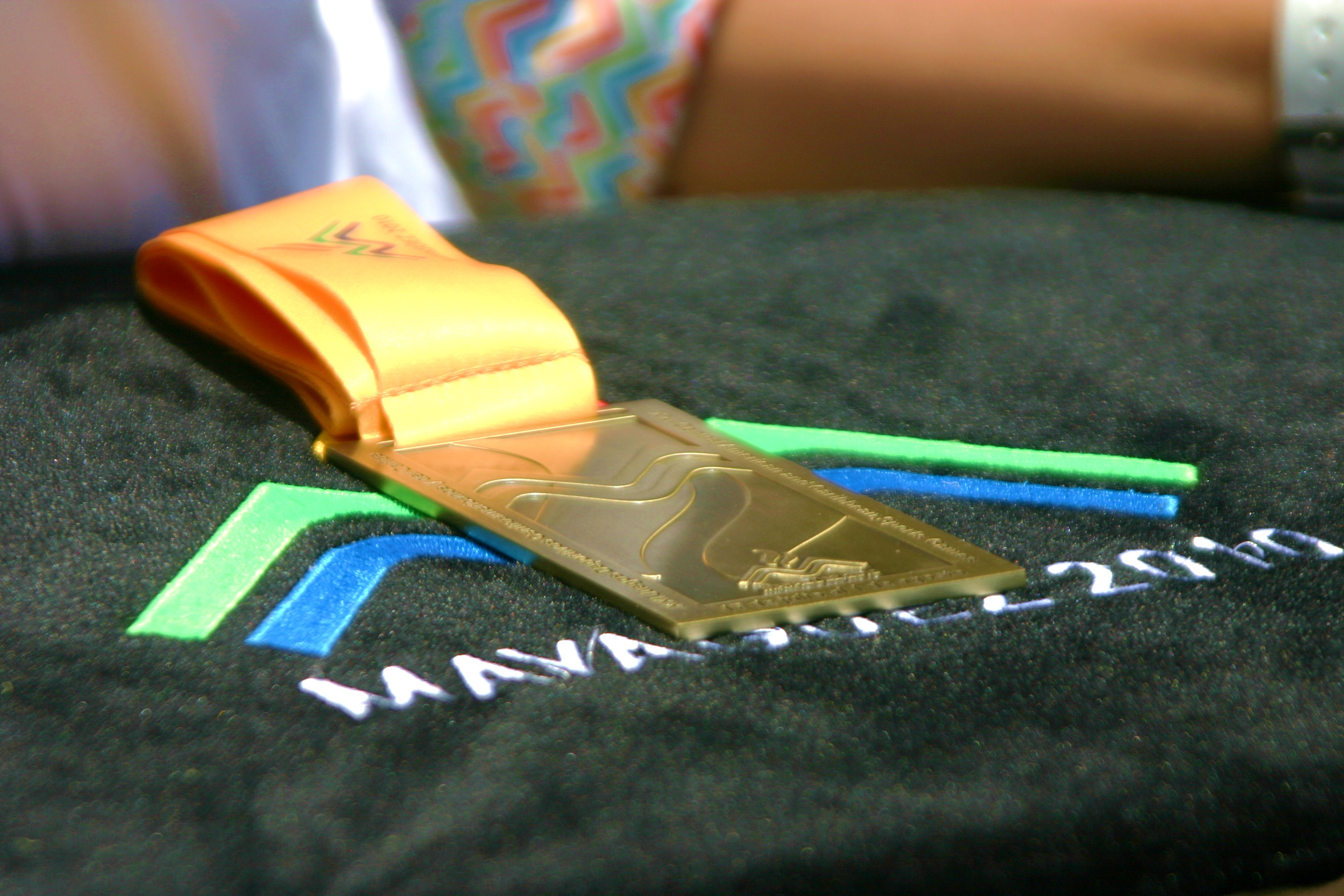
Centroamerican games 2010 gold medal, held in Mayagüez, Puerto Rico

Updated after the 2023 Central American and Caribbean Games:

| Rank | Nation | Gold | Silver | Bronze | Total |
|---|---|---|---|---|---|
| 1 | Cuba (CUB) | 1,919 | 1,013 | 798 | 3,730 |
| 2 | Mexico (MEX) | 1,523 | 1,439 | 1,290 | 4,252 |
| 3 | Colombia (COL) | 617 | 708 | 721 | 2,046 |
| 4 | Venezuela (VEN) | 596 | 828 | 998 | 2,422 |
| 5 | Puerto Rico (PUR) | 343 | 515 | 730 | 1,588 |
| 6 | Dominican Republic (DOM) | 172 | 279 | 435 | 886 |
| 7 | Jamaica (JAM) | 113 | 122 | 136 | 371 |
| 8 | Guatemala (GUA) | 105 | 184 | 370 | 659 |
| 9 | Panama (PAN) | 89 | 156 | 175 | 420 |
| 10 | Trinidad and Tobago (TTO) | 52 | 84 | 114 | 250 |
| 11 | El Salvador (SLV) | 51 | 124 | 225 | 400 |
| 12 | Costa Rica (CRC) | 38 | 47 | 104 | 189 |
| 13 | Netherlands Antilles (ANT) | 31 | 31 | 48 | 110 |
| 14 | Bahamas (BAH) | 28 | 26 | 33 | 87 |
| 15 | Centro Caribe Sports | 17 | 27 | 35 | 79 |
| 16 | Barbados (BAR) | 16 | 15 | 50 | 81 |
| 17 | Suriname (SUR) | 13 | 5 | 12 | 30 |
| 18 | U.S. Virgin Islands (VIR) | 11 | 20 | 20 | 51 |
| 19 | Guyana (GUY) | 7 | 15 | 37 | 59 |
| 20 | Cayman Islands (CYM) | 5 | 5 | 9 | 19 |
| 21 | Aruba (ABW) | 5 | 3 | 11 | 19 |
| 22 | British Virgin Islands (VGB) | 5 | 1 | 1 | 7 |
| 23 | Saint Lucia (LCA) | 4 | 1 | 1 | 6 |
| 24 | Nicaragua (NIC) | 3 | 15 | 58 | 76 |
| 25 | Honduras (HON) | 3 | 13 | 38 | 54 |
| 26 | Haiti (HTI) | 3 | 12 | 24 | 39 |
| 27 | Bermuda (BMU) | 2 | 6 | 15 | 23 |
| 28 | Belize (BLZ) | 1 | 2 | 2 | 5 |
| 29 | Dominica (DMA) | 1 | 0 | 2 | 3 |
| 30 | Saint Vincent and the Grenadines (VCT) | 1 | 0 | 1 | 2 |
| 31 | Antigua and Barbuda (ATG) | 0 | 5 | 6 | 11 |
| 32 | Grenada (GRD) | 0 | 4 | 4 | 8 |
| 33 | Saint Kitts and Nevis (KNA) | 0 | 2 | 7 | 9 |
| 34 | Curaçao (CUW) | 0 | 1 | 0 | 1 |
| 35 | Guadeloupe (GLP) | 0 | 0 | 3 | 3 |
| 36 | Martinique (MTQ) | 0 | 0 | 2 | 2 |
| Totals (36 entries) | | 5,774 | 5,708 | 6,515 | 17,997 |

== Central American and Caribbean Beach Games ==
Host cities of the Central American and Caribbean Beach Games

| Year | Edition | Host city | Host nation (as recognized by the IOC) | Dates | Nations | Events | Sports | Competitors | Top placed team |
|---|---|---|---|---|---|---|---|---|---|
| 2022 | 1 | Santa Marta | Colombia | November 19 – November 26 | 26 | 38 | 10 | 544 | Venezuela |
| 2025 | 2 | Puntarenas | Costa Rica | TBD | 32 | 47 | 19 | 1500 | |

== Central American and Caribbean Junior Games ==
| Year | Edition | Host city | Host nation (as recognized by the IOC) | Dates | Nations | Events | Sports | Competitors | Top placed team |
|---|---|---|---|---|---|---|---|---|---|
| 2024 | 1 | San Pedro Sula | Honduras | 4–20 November | TBA | TBA | TBA | TBA | TBA |

== See also ==
- Centro Caribe Sports – organizers of the Central American and Caribbean Games
- Pan American Games
  - Bolivarian Games
  - Central American and Caribbean Games on Spanish Wikipedia (in Spanish)
    - Athletics at the Central American and Caribbean Games
  - Central American Games
  - South American Games
- Central American and Caribbean Athletic Confederation
- Latin American Table Tennis Union
