= Volleyball at the Central American and Caribbean Games =

Volleyball for both men and women has been played at the Central American and Caribbean Games since 1930, when the second edition of the multi-sports event was staged in Havana, Cuba.

== Men's Winners ==
Central American and Caribbean Games
Year	Host	Gold	Silver	Bronze	4th Place
1930; Details	Havana, Cuba	Mexico	Cuba	El Salvador
1935; Details	San Salvador, El Salvador	Mexico	Puerto Rico	Cuba
1938; Details	Panama City, Panama	Puerto Rico	Mexico	Cuba	Panama
1946; Details	Barranquilla, Colombia	Cuba	Puerto Rico	Mexico	Dominican Republic
1950; Details	Guatemala City, Guatemala	Mexico	Cuba	Puerto Rico	Guatemala
1954; Details	Mexico City, Mexico	Mexico	Puerto Rico	Cuba	Dominican Republic
1959; Details	Caracas, Venezuela	Mexico	Venezuela	Puerto Rico	Netherlands Antilles
1962; Details	Kingston, Jamaica	Mexico	Dominican Republic	Venezuela	Cuba
1966; Details	San Juan, Puerto Rico	Cuba	Venezuela	Mexico	Puerto Rico
1970; Details	Panama City, Panama	Cuba	Venezuela	Mexico	Netherlands Antilles
1974; Details	Santo Domingo, Dominican Republic	Cuba	Mexico	Dominican Republic	Venezuela
1978; Details	Medellín, Colombia	Cuba	Venezuela	Mexico	Dominican Republic
1982; Details	Havana, Cuba	Cuba	Mexico	Venezuela	Puerto Rico
1986; Details	Santiago, Dominican Republic	Cuba	Dominican Republic	Puerto Rico	Venezuela
1990; Details	Mexico City, Mexico	Cuba	Mexico	Venezuela	Puerto Rico
1993; Details	Ponce, Puerto Rico	Cuba	Puerto Rico	Venezuela	Mexico
1998; Details	Maracaibo, Venezuela	Cuba	Mexico	Venezuela	Puerto Rico
2002; Details	San Salvador, El Salvador	Puerto Rico	Mexico	Venezuela	Dominican Republic
2006; Details	Cartagena, Colombia	Puerto Rico	Cuba	Venezuela	Dominican Republic
2010; Details	Mayaguez, Puerto Rico	Puerto Rico	Venezuela	Mexico	Dominican Republic
2014; Details	Veracruz, Mexico	Dominican Republic	Puerto Rico	Cuba	Mexico
2018; Details	Barranquilla, Colombia	Puerto Rico	Colombia	Mexico	Cuba
2023; Details	San Salvador, El Salvador	Cuba	Dominican Republic	Puerto Rico	Guatemala

=== Mens's Medal table ===
Rank	Nation	Gold	Silver	Bronze	Total
1	Cuba	11	3	4	18
2	Mexico	6	6	6	18
3	Puerto Rico	5	5	4	14
4	Dominican Republic	1	3	1	5
5	Venezuela	0	5	7	12
6	Colombia	0	1	0	1
7	El Salvador	0	0	1	1
Totals (7 entries)		23	23	23	69

== Women's Winners ==
Central American and Caribbean Games
Year	Host	Gold	Silver	Bronze	4th Place
1938; Details	Panama City, Panama	Mexico	Puerto Rico	Panama
1946; Details	Barranquilla, Colombia	Dominican Republic	Puerto Rico	Mexico	Venezuela
1959; Details	Caracas, Venezuela	Mexico	Venezuela	Netherlands Antilles
1962; Details	Kingston, Jamaica	Dominican Republic	Puerto Rico	Mexico	Cuba
1966; Details	San Juan, Puerto Rico	Cuba	Mexico	Dominican Republic	Venezuela
1970; Details	Panama City, Panama	Mexico	Cuba	Venezuela	Dominican Republic
1974; Details	Santo Domingo, Dominican Republic	Cuba	Mexico	Dominican Republic	Puerto Rico
1978; Details	Medellín, Colombia	Cuba	Mexico	Dominican Republic	Colombia
1982; Details	Havana, Cuba	Cuba	Mexico	Dominican Republic	Puerto Rico
1986; Details	Santiango, Dominican Republic	Cuba	Mexico	Venezuela	Dominican Republic
1990; Details	Mexico City, Mexico	Cuba	Mexico	Venezuela	Dominican Republic
1993; Details	Ponce, Puerto Rico	Cuba	Mexico	Venezuela	Dominican Republic
1998; Details	Maracaibo, Venezuela	Cuba	Dominican Republic	Venezuela	Puerto Rico
2002; Details	San Salvador, El Salvador	Dominican Republic	Venezuela	Mexico	Puerto Rico
2006; Details	Cartagena, Colombia	Dominican Republic	Cuba	Puerto Rico	Mexico
2010; Details	Mayaguez, Puerto Rico	Dominican Republic	Puerto Rico	Costa Rica	Trinidad and Tobago
2014; Details	Veracruz, Mexico	Dominican Republic	Puerto Rico	Cuba	Mexico
2018; Details	Barranquilla, Colombia	Dominican Republic	Colombia	Puerto Rico	Mexico
2023; Details	San Salvador, El Salvador	Dominican Republic	Puerto Rico	Cuba	Colombia

=== Woman's Medal table ===
Rank	Nation	Gold	Silver	Bronze	Total
1	Cuba	8	2	2	12
2	Dominican Republic	8	1	4	13
3	Mexico	3	7	3	13
4	Puerto Rico	0	6	2	8
5	Venezuela	0	2	5	7
6	Colombia	0	1	0	1
7	Costa Rica	0	0	1	1
7	Netherlands Antilles	0	0	1	1
7	Panama	0	0	1	1
Totals (9 entries)		19	19	19	57
