= Cuba men's national volleyball team =

Men's national volleyball team representing Cuba

Cuba
- Nickname(s): Los leones del voleibol cubano (Lions of Cuban volleyball)
- Association: Federación Cubana De Voleibol
- Confederation: NORCECA
- Head coach: Jesus Angel Cruz Lopez
- FIVB ranking: 15 (3 August 2026)

Uniforms
Home	Away	Third

Summer Olympics
- Appearances: 7 (First in 1972)
- Best result: (1976)

World Championship
- Appearances: 14 (First in 1956)
- Best result: (1990, 2010)

World Cup
- Appearances: 8 (First in 1969)
- Best result: (1989)

NORCECA Championship
- Appearances: 28 (First in 1969)
- Best result: (16 times)
Honours
Event	1st	2nd	3rd
Olympic Games	0	0	1
World Championship	0	2	2
World Cup	1	3	1
World Grand Champions Cup	1	1	2
World League	1	5	3
Challenger Cup	1	1	0
NORCECA Championship	16	5	5
Pan-American Cup	4	0	3
Other competitions	0	2	1
Total	24	19	18
Medal Record
Olympic Games
Bronze medal – third place	1976 Montreal	Team
World Championship
Silver medal – second place	1990 Brazil	Team
Silver medal – second place	2010 Italy	Team
Bronze medal – third place	1978 Italy	Team
Bronze medal – third place	1998 Japan	Team
World Cup
Gold medal – first place	1989 Japan	
Silver medal – second place	1981 Japan	
Silver medal – second place	1991 Japan	
Silver medal – second place	1999 Japan	
Bronze medal – third place	1977 Japan	
World Grand Champions Cup
Gold medal – first place	2001 Japan	
Silver medal – second place	2009 Japan	
Bronze medal – third place	1993 Japan	
Bronze medal – third place	1997 Japan	
World League
Gold medal – first place	1998 Milan	
Silver medal – second place	1991 Milan	
Silver medal – second place	1992 Genova	
Silver medal – second place	1994 Milan	
Silver medal – second place	1997 Moscow	
Silver medal – second place	1999 Mar del Plata	
Bronze medal – third place	1995 Rio de Janeiro	
Bronze medal – third place	2005 Belgrade	
Bronze medal – third place	2012 Bulgaria	
Challenger Cup
Gold medal – first place	2022 Seoul	
Silver medal – second place	2019 Ljubljana	
NORCECA Championship
Gold medal – first place	1969 Mexico City	
Gold medal – first place	1971 Havana	
Gold medal – first place	1975 Los Angeles	
Gold medal – first place	1977 Santo Domingo	
Gold medal – first place	1979 Havana	
Gold medal – first place	1981 Mexico City	
Gold medal – first place	1987 Havana	
Gold medal – first place	1989 San Juan	
Gold medal – first place	1991 Regina	
Gold medal – first place	1993 New Orleans	
Gold medal – first place	1995 Edmonton	
Gold medal – first place	1997 San Juan	
Gold medal – first place	2001 Bridgetown	
Gold medal – first place	2009 Bayamon	
Gold medal – first place	2011 Mayaguez	
Gold medal – first place	2019 Winnipeg	
Silver medal – second place	1973 Tijuana	
Silver medal – second place	1985 Santiago	
Silver medal – second place	1999 Monterrey	
Silver medal – second place	2005 Winnipeg	
Silver medal – second place	2015 Córdoba	
Bronze medal – third place	1983 Indianapolis	
Bronze medal – third place	2003 Culiacán	
Bronze medal – third place	2007 Anaheim	
Bronze medal – third place	2013 Langley	
Bronze medal – third place	2023 Charleston	
Pan-American Cup
Gold medal – first place	2014 Tijuana	Team
Gold medal – first place	2016 Mexico City	Team
Gold medal – first place	2019 Colima City	Team
Gold medal – first place	2022 Gatineau	Team
Bronze medal – third place	2007 Santo Domingo	Team
Bronze medal – third place	2017 Gatineau	Team
Bronze medal – third place	2018 Córdoba	Team
Central American and Caribbean Games
Silver medal – second place	2006 Cartagena	Team
Goodwill Games
Bronze medal – third place	1990 Seattle	
Friendship Games
Silver medal – second place	1984 Moscow	

The Cuba men's national volleyball team (Spanish: Selección masculina de voleibol de Cuba) represents Cuba in international volleyball competitions and friendly matches, governed by Federación Cubana De Voleibol. Cuba in the 1976 Summer Olympics won their first bronze medal. In FIVB competitions, the national team won one gold each at World Cup, World Grand Champions Cup, World League and Challenger Cup. Cuba also attained two silver and two bronze World Championship medals and have won the NORCECA Championship 15 times with a 6-peat record.

== Results ==
=== Olympic Games ===
- 1972 – 10th place
- 1976 – Bronze medal
- 1980 – 7th place
- 1984 – Qualified but withdrew due 1984 boycott
- 1988 – Quafified but withdrew due 1988 boycott
- 1992 – 4th place
- 1996 – 6th place
- 2000 – 7th place
- 2004 – Didn't Qualify
- 2008 – Didn't Qualify
- 2012 – Didn't Qualify
- 2016 – 11th place
- 2020 – Didn't Qualify
- 2024 – Didn't Qualify
- 2028 – Qualified

=== World Championship ===
- 1956 – 19th place
- 1966 – 17th place
- 1970 – 13th place
- 1974 – 8th place
- 1978 – Bronze medal
- 1982 – 10th place
- 1986 – 5th place
- 1990 – Silver medal
- 1994 – 4th place
- 1998 – Bronze medal
- 2002 – 19th place
- 2006 – 15th place
- 2010 – Silver medal
- 2014 – 11th place
- 2018 – 18th place
- 2022 – 14th place
- 2025 – 20th place
- 2027 – Qualified

=== World Cup ===
- 1969 – 9th place
- 1977 – Bronze medal
- 1981 – Silver medal
- 1989 – Gold medal
- 1991 – Silver medal
- 1995 – 6th place
- 1999 – Silver medal
- 2011 – 5th place

=== World Grand Champions Cup ===
- 1993 – (bronze) Bronze medal
- 1997 – (bronze) Bronze medal
- 2001 – (gold) Gold medal
- 2009 – (silver) Silver medal

=== World League ===
- 1991 – (silver) Silver medal
- 1992 – (silver) Silver medal
- 1993 – 4th place
- 1994 – (silver) Silver medal
- 1995 – (bronze) Bronze medal
- 1996 – 4th place
- 1997 – (silver) Silver medal
- 1998 – (gold) Gold medal
- 1999 – (silver) Silver medal
- 2000 – 8th place
- 2001 – 5th place
- 2002 – 13th place
- 2003 – 13th place
- 2004 – 7th place
- 2005 – (bronze) Bronze medal
- 2006 – 7th place
- 2007 – 7th place
- 2008 – 10th place
- 2009 – 4th place
- 2010 – 4th place
- 2011 – 8th place
- 2012 – (bronze) Bronze medal
- 2013 – 13th place
- 2014 – 21st place
- 2015 – 18th place
- 2016 – 22nd place
- 2017 – Withdrew

=== Nations League ===
Nations League record
Year	Round	Position	GP	MW	ML	SW	SL	Squad
(France) 2018	Did not participate (Note: Participated in the Challenger Cup)							
(United States) 2019	Did not participate							
(Italy) 2021	Did not participate							
(Italy) 2022	Did not participate							
(Poland) 2023	Preliminary round	13th	12	3	9	15	33	Squad
(Poland) 2024	Preliminary round	9th	12	5	7	24	26	Squad
(China) 2025	Final round	7th	13	6	7	29	29	Squad
(China) 2026	Preliminary round	17th	12	3	9	16	29	Squad
(N/A) 2027	qualified							
Total	0 Titles	5/9	49	17	32	84	117	—

=== Challenger Cup ===
- 2018 – 4th place
- 2019 – (silver) Silver medal
- 2022 – (gold) Gold medal
- 2023 – Participated in Nations League

=== Pan American Games ===
- 1959 – 7th place
- 1967 – (bronze) Bronze medal
- 1971 – (gold) Gold medal
- 1975 – (gold) Gold medal
- 1979 – (gold) Gold medal
- 1983 – (silver) Silver medal
- 1987 – (silver) Silver medal
- 1991 – (gold) Gold medal
- 1995 – (bronze) Bronze medal
- 1999 – (gold) Gold medal
- 2003 – (silver) Silver medal
- 2007 – (bronze) Bronze medal
- 2011 – (silver) Silver medal
- 2015 – 5th place
- 2019 – (silver) Silver medal
- 2023 – 4th place

=== NORCECA Championship ===
- 1969 – (gold) Gold medal
- 1971 – (gold) Gold medal
- 1973 – (silver) Silver medal
- 1975 – (gold) Gold medal
- 1977 – (gold) Gold medal
- 1979 – (gold) Gold medal
- 1981 – (gold) Gold medal
- 1983 – (bronze) Bronze medal
- 1985 – (silver) Silver medal
- 1987 – (gold) Gold medal
- 1989 – (gold) Gold medal
- 1991 – (gold) Gold medal
- 1993 – (gold) Gold medal
- 1995 – (gold) Gold medal
- 1997 – (gold) Gold medal
- 1999 – (silver) Silver medal
- 2001 – (gold) Gold medal
- 2003 – (bronze) Bronze medal
- 2005 – (silver) Silver medal
- 2007 – (bronze) Bronze medal
- 2009 – (gold) Gold medal
- 2011 – (gold) Gold medal
- 2013 – (bronze) Bronze medal
- 2015 – (silver) Silver medal
- 2017 – did not participate
- 2019 – (gold) Gold medal
- 2021 – 4th place
- 2023 – (bronze) Bronze medal
- 2026 – (bronze) Bronze medal

=== Pan-American Cup ===
- 2006 – 5th place
- 2007 – (bronze) Bronze medal
- 2014 – (gold) Gold medal
- 2016 – (gold) Gold medal
- 2017 – (bronze) Bronze medal
- 2018 – (bronze) Bronze medal
- 2019 – (gold) Gold medal
- 2021 – Withdrew
- 2022 – (gold) Gold medal

=== America's Cup ===
- 1998 – (bronze) Bronze medal
- 1999 – 4th place
- 2000 – (gold) Gold medal
- 2001 – (silver) Silver medal
- 2005 – (bronze) Bronze medal
- 2007 – (bronze) Bronze medal
- 2008 – (gold) Gold medal

=== Central American and Caribbean Games ===
- 1930 – (silver) Silver medal
- 1935 – (bronze) Bronze medal
- 1938 – (bronze) Bronze medal
- 1946 – (gold) Gold medal
- 1950 – (silver) Silver medal
- 1954 – (bronze) Bronze medal
- 1962 – 4th place
- 1966 – (gold) Gold medal
- 1970 – (gold) Gold medal
- 1974 – (gold) Gold medal
- 1978 – (gold) Gold medal
- 1982 – (gold) Gold medal
- 1986 – (gold) Gold medal
- 1990 – (gold) Gold medal
- 1993 – (gold) Gold medal
- 1998 – (gold) Gold medal
- 2002 – Did not participate
- 2006 – (silver) Silver medal
- 2010 – Did not participate
- 2014 – (bronze) Bronze medal
- 2018 – 4th place
- 2023 – (gold) Gold medal

=== Goodwill Games ===
- 1986 – did not participate
- 1990 – (bronze) Bronze medal

== Team ==
=== Current squad ===
The following is the Cuban roster in the 2025 FIVB Men's Volleyball Nations League

Head coach: (Cuba) Jesus Cruz

No.	Name	Date of birth	Height	Weight	2023-24 Club	2024-25 Club	2025-26 Club
1	José Masso	2 December 1997	2.04 m (6 ft 8 in)	96 kg (212 lb)	(Germany) VfB Friedrichshafen	(Germany) VfB Friedrichshafen	(Iran) Paykan Tehran
2	Osniel Melgarejo	18 December 1997	1.98 m (6 ft 6 in)	86 kg (190 lb)	(Italy) Allianz Milano	(Russia) Dynamo-LO	(Russia) Dynamo-LO
8	Julio Gomez	24 July 1999	1.94 m (6 ft 4 in)	86 kg (190 lb)	(Austria) SK Aich/Dob	(Slovenia) Calcit Kramnik	(Turkey) Fenerbahçe S.K.
5	Javier Concepción	26 December 1997	2.00 m (6 ft 7 in)	92 kg (203 lb)	(France) Poitiers	(Iran) Shahdab Yazd	(Turkey) Akkuş Belediyespor
6	Christian Thondike Mejías	28 May 2001	1.95 m (6 ft 5 in)	76 kg (168 lb)	(Turkey) Cizre Belediyespor	(Turkey) Cizre Belediyespor	(Turkey) İstanbul Gençlik
7	Yonder Garcia(L)	23 February 1993	1.83 m (6 ft 0 in)	78 kg (172 lb)	(Egypt) Al Ahly	(Egypt) Al Ahly	
6	Alejandro Rodriguez	13 December 2003	2.08 m (6 ft 10 in)	98 kg (216 lb)	(Czech Republic) Ceske Bujedovice	(Czech Republic) Ceske Bujedovice	(Romania) Corona Brasov
14	Yordan Bisset	21 October 1994	1.94 m (6 ft 4 in)	98 kg (216 lb)	(Brazil) Joinville Volei	(Italy) Brescia	(Israel) Maccabi Tel Aviv
13	Robertlandy Simon	11 June 1987	2.08 m (6 ft 10 in)	110 kg (240 lb)	(Italy) Gas Sales Piacenza	(Italy) Gas Sales Piacenza	(Italy) Gas Sales Piacenza
15	Bryan Camino	23 February 2003	1.86 m (6 ft 1 in)	80 kg (180 lb)	(Austria) SK Aich/Dob	(Austria) SK Aich/Dob	(Slovenia) OK Maribor
21	Roamy Alonso	24 July 1997	2.03 m (6 ft 8 in)	105 kg (231 lb)	(Italy) Gas Sales Piacenza	(Italy) Prisma Taranto	(Turkey) Galatasaray SK
18	Miguel Ángel López	25 March 1997	1.90 m (6 ft 3 in)	90 kg (200 lb)	(Brazil) Sada Cruzeiro	(Japan) Panasonic Panthers	(Japan) Panasonic Panthers
22	Jose Miguel Gutierrez	27 October 2001	1.94 m (6 ft 4 in)	73 kg (161 lb)	(Italy) Prisma Taranto	(Italy) Modena Volley	(Italy) Gas Sales Piacenza
23	Marlon Yant	23 May 2001	2.04 m (6 ft 8 in)	100 kg (220 lb)	(Italy) Cucine Lube Civitanova	(Russia) Zenit Saint Petersburg	(Russia) Zenit Saint Petersburg
25	David Fiel	28 August 1993	2.06 m (6 ft 9 in)	104 kg (229 lb)	(Belarus) Shakhtior Soligorsk	(Russia) Kuzbass Kemerovo	(Russia) Kuzbass Kemerovo

=== Dream Team Squad ===
After 2001, many players defected from Cuba seeking better life conditions. Some of them excelled during their pro career, being more often considered the best of their positions. The following list follow 15 men throughout that period of time, that one way or another make history and were called Dream team squad.

Head coach: Gilberto Herrera

No.	Name	Date of birth	Height	Weight	Spike	Block	Club
1	Wilfredo Leon Venero	31 July 1993	2.02 m (6 ft 8 in)	96 kg (212 lb)	380 cm (150 in)	346 cm (136 in)	(Poland) LKPS Lublin
13	Robertlandy Simon	11 June 1987	2.08 m (6 ft 10 in)	114 kg (251 lb)	389 cm (153 in)	326 cm (128 in)	(Italy) Cucine Lube Civitanova
4	Yoandry Leal	31 August 1988	2.01 m (6 ft 7 in)	107 kg (236 lb)	371 cm (146 in)	348 cm (137 in)	(Italy) Leo Shoes PerkinElmer Modena
5	Osmany Juantorena	12 August 1985	2.00 m (6 ft 7 in)	85 kg (187 lb)	370 cm (150 in)	340 cm (130 in)	(Italy) Cucine Lube Civitanova
14	Raydel Hierrezuelo	14 July 1987	1.97 m (6 ft 6 in)	87 kg (192 lb)	340 cm (130 in)	335 cm (132 in)	(Greece) Foynikas Syros
9	Michael Sánchez	5 June 1986	2.06 m (6 ft 9 in)	100 kg (220 lb)	365 cm (144 in)	340 cm (130 in)	(South Korea) Korean Air Jumbos
19	Fernando Hernandez	11 September 1989	1.96 m (6 ft 5 in)	78 kg (172 lb)	358 cm (141 in)	339 cm (133 in)	(Greece) PAOK Thessaloniki
15	Oreol Camejo	22 July 1986	2.08 m (6 ft 10 in)	94 kg (207 lb)	354 cm (139 in)	326 cm (128 in)	(Russia) Zenit Saint Petersburg
1	Leonel Marshall	25 September 1979	1.96 m (6 ft 5 in)	96 kg (212 lb)	383 cm (151 in)	353 cm (139 in)	(Italy) LPR Piacenza
7	Angel Dennis	13 June 1977	1.93 m (6 ft 4 in)	83 kg (183 lb)	360 cm (140 in)	330 cm (130 in)	(Portugal) Sporting CP
14	Ihosvany Hernández	6 June 1972	2.06 m (6 ft 9 in)	103 kg (227 lb)	368 cm (145 in)	349 cm (137 in)	Retired

== 2016 Finland rape incident ==
Eight members of the Cuban national men's volleyball team, including the team's captain, were held in Tampere, Finland on suspicion of aggravated gang rape of a 35-year-old Finnish woman, as of July 2016. Two of them later had their charges dismissed. The incident took place in the Hotel Ilves at Tampere where the Olympics-bound Cuban team were staying. The arrested players were scheduled to play with the Cuban team at the 2016 Summer Olympics in Rio de Janeiro.

On 16 August, the six team members still remaining in custody were charged with aggravated rape at Pirkanmaa District Court and the proceedings started on 29 August. On 20 September, four of the men, Osmany Uriarte, Rolando Cepeda Abreu, Ricardo Norberto Calvo, and Abraham Alfonso Gavilán were given five-year jail sentences, while Luis Sosa Sierra was facing a prison term of three and a half years. All men appealed, and on 30 June 2017, the Turku court of appeal decreased the length of all sentences and lifted the sentence of Sosa Sierra. Sosa Sierra was found not guilty due to lack of evidence, and he received compensation from the government of Finland of 200,000 euros for financial and reputational harm.

According to The New York Times, the Cuban Volleyball Association stated early on that the athletes’ behavior was counter to the “discipline the sense of honor and respect that govern our sport and society”.

== Kit providers ==
The table below shows the history of kit providers for the Cuba national volleyball team.

Period	Kit provider
2000–	Adidas; Puma

=== Sponsorship ===
Honda is a main sponsor.
