= Water polo in Puerto Rico =

- Country: Puerto Rico
- Governing body: Federación Puertorriqueña de Natación
- National team: Puerto Rico

National competitions
- Liga de Water Polo Superior de Puerto Rico

International competitions
- Water polo at the Central American and Caribbean Games; Water polo at the Pan American Games

In Puerto Rico the practice of water polo has historically been considered a niche sport, putting it outside the scope of traditional competition and mostly serving as a recreational activity. As such, it wasn't officially sanctioned until 1965 and was not given a separate federation, instead being absorbed by the Federación Puertorriqueña de Natación (FPN), which holds general jurisdiction over most water sports. Despite this, the Puerto Rico men's national water polo team won its first international medal in the 1938 Central American and Caribbean Games, 29 years before recording its first win and while the practice of the sport was inexistent in the archipelago. Due to this, the accolade was met with cynicism and used as the recurrent subject of parody during decades, until an organized program emerged during the second half of the 20th Century.

Seen as a hobby, the sport had little competitive practice and combined with sparse international representation, the Puerto Rico water polo national team remained a winless regional medalist for decades. A 10-8 win over Curaçao on December 27, 1967 as part of a Triangular Tournament held at the Escambrón Olympic pool represented the program's first international win. After finishing second with a record of 2-2 (both losses to Jamaica) in this event, the federation invited a team from Brazil to play against the combine. By the 1990s the program was consistently winning medals in regional events, continuing this performance into the 2010s. During the 2020s, the men's water polo team has been the back-to-back Central American and Caribbean Games champions, while the women's team has continued to secure podiums at this event.

== History ==
=== Beginnings, first international medal (1938–1964) ===
Water polo was introduced to Puerto Rico following the Spanish-American War and by 1927, social events were featuring competitions of the sport. An international selection first took the stage at the tournament of the 1938 Central American and Caribbean Games. This was the very first time a team was organized, with the press emphasizing that the practice of the sport was completely unknown in the island prior to this point. The participation was in part possible due to the government's interest in participating in the most sports possible during the event. Prior to the Panama games, Miguel Ángel Rodríguez approached Pablo Albanense to enter the water polo tournament, which at the moment was expected to be a four team affair also involving a Mexican team that later withdrew. He joined Guigo Otero Suro, Salvador Torrós, Antonio del Valle, Héctor Cordero and George Johnson to form the lineup. Due to the sport being foreign to Puerto Rico at the time, none of the players had ever played a single game of water polo, receiving a last minute three-day crash course from an English-speaking coach. The participation in the sport led to arguments being made for including them in the curriculum of local schools. The team debuted with a loss before Panama, then considered amongst the strongest in the region and with whom they had been training and playing scrimmages at Fort Clayton. This was followed by a match against Jamaica, losing the game but eventually carrying the tournament's bronze medal. When the Medalla de Puerto Rico was created as an award for local athletes in 1940, the Puerto Rico Sports and Recreation Commission conditioned awarding it to the sport pending the decision of Swimming Adviser Luis Saavedra, expressing reserves at the competitive level of the new program. In 1941, the Federación Deportiva del Norte began organizing water polo tournaments between civilian and military teams in the northern region of Puerto Rico. A water polo season was planned for June through August in a plan developed by the Sports and Recreation Commission in 1942. Years later, the results of the "improvised team" were still treated as sports trivia and a curious fact. In 1957, permits to build a water sports facility at hotel Laguna Condado were denied, halting the plans to expand the infrastructure available for the practice of the sport.

When Puerto Rico made its return to competitive water sports at the 1959 Central American and Caribbean Games, the press noted that in the decades since the last participating, water polo had been generally regarded as an ironic and comedic fact that the team had a medal for a sport that was still not practiced in the island. With this participation, it was one of fourteen teams sent to the event. However, no water polo team was organized for the 1959 Pan American Games. In 1959, the absence of infrastructure to practice water polo and the necessity of it for international competition was a topic of media coverage. Among the players that gained some coverage during this time was Rodrigo Otero, a multifaceted athlete and sports executive who was widely associated with a number of sports. The term "Liga de Water Polo Profesional" was also used as veiled criticism when the Puerto Rico Winter Baseball League (now known as Liga de Béisbol Profesional Roberto Clemente) played games under the rain. By the time that the 1962 Central American and Caribbean Games were organized, water polo remained an unpracticed sport in Puerto Rico and representation remained dormant. The lack of a culture for the sport was also mocked when a day's scheduled was suspended due to rain, despite being a water sport. This was reflected in the local journalism, with one instance regarding water polo as "insipid [and] more akin to a bath time pastime". As Puerto Rico prepared to host the 1966 Central American and Caribbean Games, organizing several sports including water polo became a priority for the organizing committee. Henry Brewerton was tasked with making sure that a delegation meeting Olympic standards was created in time for the event and an Olympic pool was constructed. On February 9, 1964, Cervecería Corona and the Circuito Superior de Béisbol Aficionado held a homage to the bronze medal winners.

=== Federative organization (1965–1969) ===
Harry E. Hauck was brought to Club Caribe Hilton to identify players and prepare a team in time for the regional event. On February 8, 1965, San Antonio de Abad faced Club Caribe Hilton in the first games officially sanctioned in Puerto Rico, with the later winning 14-13 and the losing a rematch 5-9 in a series organized at San Juan. More amateur teams were organized outside the Metropolitan Area and soon faced each others, with Atlético de Ponce defeated the Tritones de Condado 11-9 in September 1965. As the games approached, the Dorado Hilton and Country Club, Club Deportivo de Ponce and other clubs joined this tendency. Club Deportivo de Ponce hosted the first Triangular Water Polo Tournament, which Club Caribe Hilton won. Prior to the CACG, Hotel Condado offered free water polo lessons open to the public. The media perception and coverage began to change, passing to be labeled as "the idea sport for the [summer] season". The local teams participated in a preparatory tournament held at San Juan in February 1966. Puerto Rico competed at a Triangular Joust of Swimming and Waterpolo held at Jamaica.

In April 1966, candidates to form the final lineup for the CACG were medically evaluated at San Juan. The final roster for the 1966 CACG was composed by Kenier Méndez, Freddy Martín, Alejandro Franco, Edwin Franco, Manuel Betancourt, Alex Hernández, Pirín Quilinchini, Antonio Vidal, Frank Roig, Juan Salicrup, Steve Benack, Pinto Nazario, Víctor Matos, Juan Curet, Jorge González and Willie Pinol. The team debuted with a 2-11 loss to Jamaica. Hauck was named head coach, with Tomás Garrido as assistant and Raúl Marcial technical director. The games were held at the Olympic pool built in Escambrón for this purpose, where the water polo national team also held several practice sessions. The team lost to Jamaica 2-11 and Barbados 2-12 and Colombia. At the CACG, water polo was one of the sports held concurrently to set an attendance record for a sports event, being estimated at 150,000. Later that year, the first men's amateur league was organized with Club Caribe Hilton emerging victorious over Condado Beach, Navy Swim Club and Mayagüez YMCA. In December 1966, Club Caribe Hilton won the first federative tournament in undefeated fashion, defeating Condado 13-8 in the final. In May 1967, the team hosted its own tournament. Puerto Rico requested to be the host of two youth tournaments.

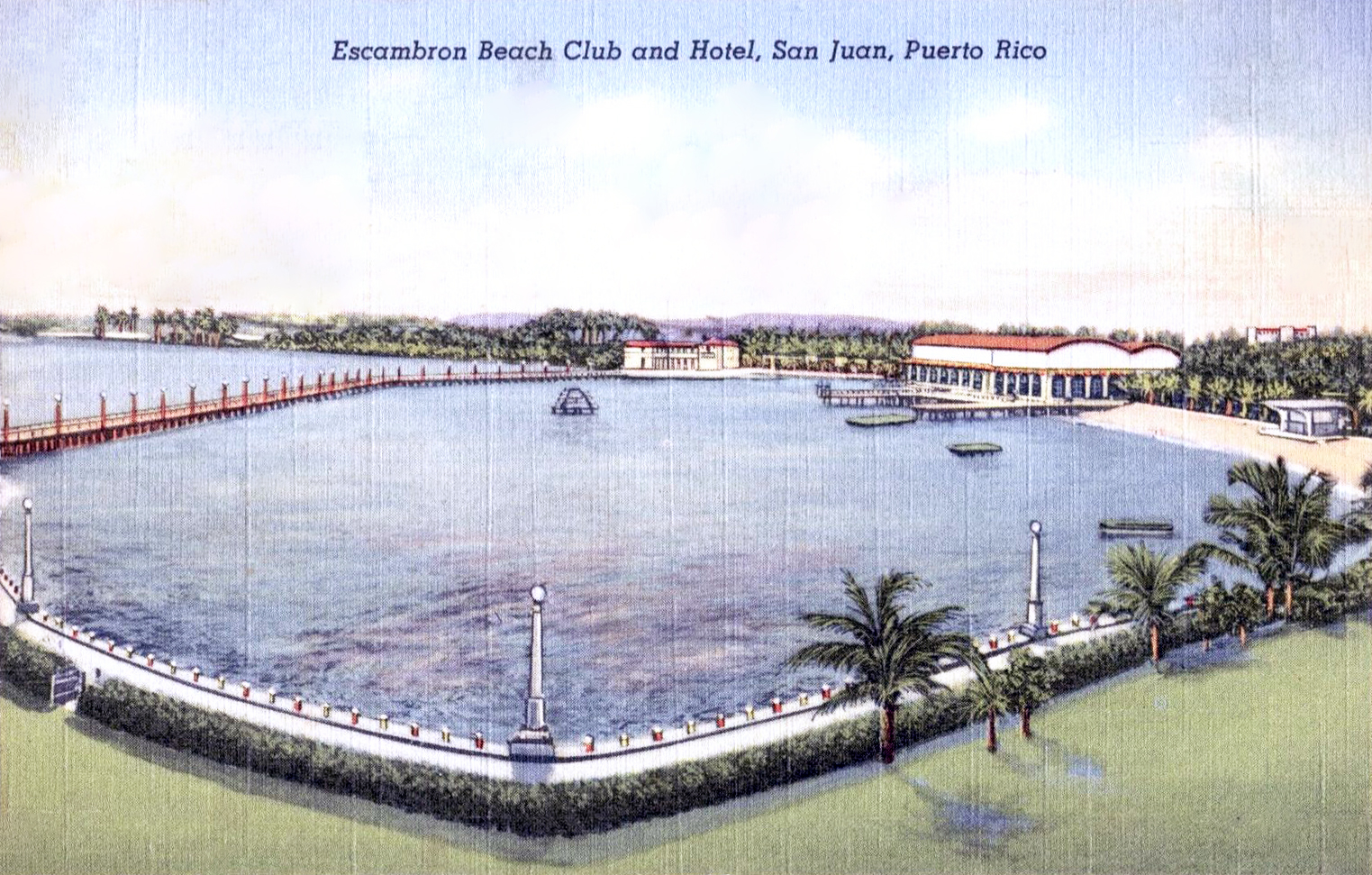
The Escambrón olympic pool.

In the 1967 season of the league, Ponce and the Tritones de Condado joined, with the new teams displaying a solid level and the latter gathering an early lead. During that summer, the federation opted not to send a team to the Pan American Games. Instead, the sanctioning body opted to organize an international triangular tournament at the Escambrón pool. The national team opened with a 1-17 loss to Jamaica, but later recorded its first international win over Curaçao 10-1. In January 1968, the federation held its assembly and decided to emphasize the development of water polo throughout the year. In January 1968, the federation held its first Junior Olympics event, which included youth water polo overseen by a subcommittee presided by George Benak. From that point afterwards, monthly U12 events were held under the sponsorship of organizations like the Phi Eta Mu fraternity, with Club Caribe Hilton defeating Caparra Country Club for the top spots in a tournament that also included Carolina Country Club and Caparra Country Club. In the senior category, Condado defeated Navy and Caribe Hilton finished third, with the federation stating that the intent was to organize the next national team. In the next stop, Caparra Country Club won the junior division over Navy while coached by former national team captain Alexander Franco. The senior division was won by Club Caribe Hilton, led by Renier Méndez who scored 17 goals. In April 1968, Puerto Rico entered a regional tournament held at Jamaica. In May, the team was invited to participate in a tournament held at Detroit, the federation sent a team to compete against various universities which they named Puerto Rico All-Stars.

During the fall of 1968, Juan Bravo Jr. organized the first public school water polo tournament with six teams and 65 players participating. In December 1968, a team coached by Salavarría competed at the AAU Junior Nationals held at Fort Lauderdale and finished third, having defeated the host team 11-8, Coral Park 11-5 and Lower Moreland 11-6. The following week they fielded two teams and hosted the New York Athletic Club and Westpoint for an invitational. Sigma fraternity sponsored a team that won the U12 category of the national championships. At the 1969 Olympic Dinner, the COPUR gave a plaque to Jorge González. In April 1969, a senior team composed by Francisco Ramis, Guillermo Ramis, Miguel Rivera, Salvador Ramirez, Eddie Purcell, Emilio Betancourt, Ulises Díaz, Tony Ríos, Juan Curet, Rafael Ortiz and Gilberto Muñiz traveled to New York to compete at the United States Indoor Nationals.

Between July and August 1969, San Juan hosted the 6th Central American and Caribbean Youth Swimming and Water Polo Championships at Escambrón. New infrastructure was built at the UPR campus at Mayagüez, where one of a set of Olympic pools was dedicated primarily for water polo and diving. Another proposal was made for the construction of a facility at Ponce. In preparation for the 1970 Central American and Caribbean Games, Puerto Rico hosted Colombia, Jamaica, Curaçao, Lower Moreland Des Moines and the Florida All Stars and the New York Athletic Club for a winter invitational at Escambrón. However, the program had mixed results in the tournament with wins over Curaçao and Des Moines. Following the event, the Casino de Puerto Rico held a homage for the national team. A team composed by was formed with Guillermo Ramis as coach and Ulises Díaz, José Rivera, Rey Díaz, Miguel Rivera, Luis A. Cotto, Pedro Pérez, Faustino Hernández, Luis F. Cotto, Raúl González, Warren Rivera and José Maldonado as players with Escambrón as its base, defeating Condado 13-8 to win the Puerto Rico championship. In January 1970, a preliminary roster was announced for the 1970 Central American and Caribbean Games consisting of Jorge González, Tony Ríos, Miguel Rivera, Salvador Ramírez, Emilio Betancourt, Carlos González, Raúl Marcial, Eduardo Purcell, Warren Rivera, Ulises Díaz, José Rodríguez, Rafael Nigaglioni, Jacinto Matías and Emmanuel Ramos. Federative president Raúl Marcial emphasized that the team was younger than others in the region, noting his belief that "the future [looked] bright". At the Olympic Dinner, Eddie Purcell received a recognition. A sum of $37,500 were awarded for the upcoming regional competitions. At the Central American and Caribbean Games, Puerto Rico advanced to the final round and was complimented by Cuban swimming coach Alberto Amaya, but lost the games during this stage 1-11, 1-12 and 4-8.

=== Regional expansion, club system consolidation (1970–1990) ===
At the behest of Marcial Rojas, water polo was included into the college level competition Liga Atlética Interuniversitaria (LAI), being played on the first semester of the academic year, with the University of Puerto Rico (UPR) quickly developing a program. The Pontifical Catholic University of Puerto Rico (PUCPR) and the Interamerican University of Puerto Rico did the same, joining several UPR campuses. In the PUCPR Intramural the invited teams were UPR Ponce, Inter American Ponce and Universidad Mundial. In December 1970, the federation held the winter tournament and repeated various of the previous edition's teams, along new enties from Iowa and the North Virginia Aquatic Club. Puerto Rico competed with two teams and the main lineup won against Curaçao 24-2, the NVAC 10-8, the Florida All-Stars 8-6, Iowa 9-5 and lost 1-9 to NYAC. At the 1971 Olympic Dinner, Emilio Betancourt received a plaque. The federation sent two teams to the VII Youth Central American Swimming, Diving and Water Polo Championships. At that event, the youngest team defeated Mexico 19-10, while the eldest defeated Panama 23-0, After both lost to the host nation, the infant team finished second by besting Panama 16-0 while the youth team lost two matches by a single point and slipped to the fourth place. Speaking to the press, Marcial labeled the improvement of the water polo program as "extraordinary" and emphasized that the teams gathered media attention. The Casino de Puerto Rico club competed at the national AAU tournament. The team defeated San Louis 15-14, Sheridan 19-16, Boston 21-15 and Portage 18-12 before losing to Chicago 14-18 to finish second at the event, José Rodríguez, Nelson Lugo, Guillermo Ramis, Edwin Purcell and Frederick Bullmar were selected to the All-Star team. With 35 goals scored, Emilio Betancourt was the tournament's second scorer.

The water polo national team was included in the delegation for the 1971 Pan American Games and Emilio Betancourt, Edmanuel Ramos, Juan Rios, Edwin Purcell, Raul Marcial, Miguel A. Rivera, Carlos González Rahola. Daniel López. Manuel Marcial, Arturo Torres and Ulises Díaz were selected and practiced three to four times a day for the event. The team debuted with a 3-13 loss to Mexico, subsequent losses to Barbados 7-5, eventually being sent to the consolation round where it was matched against Colombia. During this month, an team finished in the second position of an AAU tournament held at Florida. The federation considered bringing in a coach from Hungary for the team, while infrastructure continued to increase with an Olympic pool being inaugurated at Caguas. As the LAI tournament continued progressing in its inaugural season, Miguel Rivera established a record with 13 goals. Meanwhile, the sport continued expanding throughout the island and the western Club de Natación de Mayagüez won the U12 championship. The Casino de Puerto Rico won the 13-14 division and Country Club the senior category. Alejandro Franco of the Club de Natación de la Colonia Hispanoamericana was chosen Water Polo Coach of the Year. The federation closed the year by once again hosting the annual winter tournament. Coached by Tato Salavarría the senior team participated in a tournament held at Nebraska, finishing in the second place. The Casino de Puerto Rico's team traveled to Nebraska for the1972 AAU National Championships, finishing second. In October 1972, Puerto Rico won an invitational tournament held at Venezuela, scoring Colombia, Trinidad and Tobago and the host nation 7-4 in the final. Towards the year's end, the federation held the Puerto Rico national championships with the participation of Country Club, Escambrón, Casino de Puerto Rico, Club de Natación de Mayagüez and Colonia Hispanoamericana.

In December 1972, Puerto Rico welcomed the first edition of the AAU National Championships held outside continental North America and was also announced as the host of the 1973 AAU Junior Olympics. Two local teams were fielded for the tournament, which also included the participation of the incumbent AAU national champions Orange Coast College, San José State (California), Minnesota, Lower Moreland, the New York Athletic Club and Miami Barracuda. Playing without its main players due to injury, Puerto Rico A finished fourth with a record of 4-3. By this time, some high schools were also hosting their own independent tournaments and the sport was included in the curriculum of summer camps. The federation sent teams to compete in three categories at the VIII Central American and Caribbean Youth Swimming, Diving and Water Polo Championships. Only a year after debuting in the LAI, water polo was excluded from the program for the 1973-74 academic year. Entering the sevond round of the CACGs, the youth team defeated Mexico 7-5, while other categories experienced mixed results. The federation sent a team to compete at the 1974 Central American and Caribbean Games. The team defeated the Dominican Republic 23-0, but did not advance to the medal round. Afterwards, Fernando Salavarría met with Walter Lambert to discuss an initiative to foster player development, which included the first training camps offered by the Hall of Fame coach. Towards the year's end, the federation held the youth national championships, which were won by Mayagüez and Villa Carolina, and hosted Austria and Colombia in their winter tournament. Prior to competing in the IX Central American and Caribbean Youth Swimming, Diving and Water Polo Games, the 15-17 team was expected to be a dark horse. The infant division opened the event by tying 5-5 with Mexico, while the others recorded mixed results, Puerto Rico Juvenil B defeated El Salvador 20-4 but lost to the host team. Puerto Rico Juvenil B won the bronze medal by defeating the Dominican Republic 36-0. The following month, Escuela Antonio Lasierra at Country Club sponsored the first high school water polo tournament.

During the summer of 1976, Salavarría offered seminars on the technical development of the sport. During this time, the municipality of Caguas inaugurated an Olympic pool specifically intended to host water polo in the 1979 Pan American Games. Coached by Miguel A. Rivera the debuting University of Pittsburgh program recruited eight players developed in Puerto Rico, Butch Silva, Luis Toro, Jorge Machicote, Pequi Rolán, Tato Santiago, Roberto Simmonetti and Mike Meré, earning the moniker "Latin Salsa". Of these, Machiote, Toro, Silva and Meré were part of the All-East Star Team and helped the program win the East Coast championship, while Rivera was named coach of the year for the division. Other Puerto Rican players competing in the NCAA included Kaki Steffens at Berkley, Harry Hauck, Rafael Morales and Rafael González at De Anza College and Carlos González and Alfredo Lespier at California. Locally, the youth tournaments continued with the Arecibo Country Club winning the 13–14 division and Mayagüez the 15–17 category. The federation sent three teams to the X Central American and Caribbean Youth Swimming, Diving and Water Polo Games coached by Salavarría and Miguel Vélez. Puerto Rico debuted by defeating Mexico 5-4 in Youth A and the Netherlands Antilles in Youth B. The teams continued by defeating Mexico in the Infant category 4-3 and Juvenile 9-7. The Infantile team advanced to the final with a 6-2 win over Colombia, while the 13-14 team lost 10-15 to Cuba after defeating the Dominican Republic 14-0. The infantile team finished second losing to Cuba, while the others secured medals when the 13-14 team defeated Panama 17-0 and the 15-17 Colombia 7-6. The 15-17 team defeated Venezuela 15-17 to win the tournament's bronze medal. Fwderative president Orban Mendoza expressed satisfaction at the program's performance, being the first time that it won medals in all three categories. That year, Diana Hatler and Carlos Berrocal represented the sport at the Olympic Dinner.

During the summer, Salavarría coached the team at an invitational held at Havana with the intention of practicing the team prior to the 1978 Central American and Caribbean Games. The roster was composed by Eduardo Mayol, Carlos Steffens, Jorge Machicote, Edwin Torres, Víctor Ouslan, Harry Hauck, Timothy Hauck, Raul Morán, Luis Montalvo, Manfredo Lespier, Butch Silva, Luis Toro, Mariano Fort and Emmanuel Ramos. There Puerto Rico lost a close game to Pan American champions Mexico, 8-5, and defeated one of three Cuban teams. Harry Hauck led the tournament in scoring and Carlos Steffens was selected the tournament's best technical player. Historically, the placement of water polo within the federation has led to the division of funds between four different sports and less training and exhibition experience for the players. That year, the local league expanded to 27 teams and over 300 players, playing its longest season yet. Puerto Rico debuted at the Central American and Caribbean Games with a 13-5 win over Venezuela. During the fall, Orlando Mendoza gathered a shot effectivity of 55% and received a varsity letter while playing for Yale. In 1979, the national program made a preparatory tour to the United States. Expectations were moderate prior to the 1979 Pan American Games, with the team being seen as a dark horse for a possible bronze medal but a lack of experience being emphasized. Puerto Rico defeated Brazil 7-5, tied with Canada 8-8, lost to the United States 2-6 and Cuba 6-12, before tying with Mexico 5-5. This performance was good enough for the fourth place and qualified the team for a Pre-Olympic tournament to be held the following year. Entering the 1980s, water polo continued being a niche sport but well established in summer camps and schools. Water polo was among the sports sponsored by the government in the 1980 Artistadas, an artistic sports event. The municipality of Ponce hosted the youth Pan American tournament in its aquatic facilities in a bid to be selected for the 1983 Pan American Games. The 1982 season marked the first of seven national club championships won by the Escambrón club.

In preparation for the 1986 Central American and Caribbean Games, federative president Pito Morales Cabranes announced the designation of Francisco Guerrero as the program's new head coach, replacing the retiring Salavarría. At the event, Puerto Rico defeated the Dominican Republic 18-3. Rickey Ouslán, who was part of the team, player for West Valley College. Prior to the 1987 Pan American Games, the participation of the water polo team in the delegation was uncertain. During the summer of 1987, the United States Water Polo Federation invited Puerto Rico for an international event to be held at Colorado Springs, with the team playing exhibitions at California prior to this. Water polo fielded teams in both sexes at the IV International Cup held at Round Hill in Trujillo Alto in April 1988, with the women's team defeating the United States 12-6, 8-3 and 12-7 in consecutive games. Following this, the Puerto Rico Olympic Committee (COPUR) assigned $37,000 so that the Puerto Rico could play at an international tournament, a decision that attracted some criticism from the president of the Federación Puertorriqueña de Boxeo Aficionado, which oversees the longstanding practice of boxing in the island. In April 1989, the Escambrón club won the Spring Invitational Spring Break Tournament held at Fort Lauderdale, having defended its national championship prior to this and out scoring the competition 84-42. Luis Herrera scored 22 goals, being named MVP, while Vincent Caballero and Rafael Solís won the awards for Best Defense and Best Goalkeeper.

=== International consistency and women's program (1991–2010) ===
Puerto Rico opened the next decade by competing at the 1990 Central American and Caribbean Games held at Mexico City. The team scored a 29–1 win over Guatemala and dropped a 15–11 game to the host nation to win the tournament's bronze medal. This was followed by the 1991 Pan American Games held at Havana, Cuba. Puerto Rico opened the group stage by scoring a 13–8 win over Argentina, but followed this by 16–9 and 23-3 losses to Canada and the home team. In the classification round, the team outscored Jamaica 24–4. In the fifth round game, they lost 12-16 to Mexico. Puerto Rico hosted the 1993 Central American and Caribbean Games at Ponce. The team lost 20–3 to Cuba, 11-10 to Venezuela and 12-6 to Mexico, before recovering with 28-4 and 34-1 wins over Jamaica and Guatemala that allowed it to win the bronze medal. The program recorded its worst performance of the 1990s at the 1995 Pan American Games organized at Mar del Plata, Argentina. Losing consecutive games to Canada, Cuba, Mexico and the host nation to finish in the 7th place. Puerto Rico was able to rebound with its best result for the decade at the 1998 Central American and Caribbean Games tournament at Maracaibo, Venezuela. There the team advanced over teams like Mexico to secure the silver medal, losing the final to Cuba. The program expanded for the 1999 Pan American Games, with the introduction of the Puerto Rico women's national water polo team. The men won their opening game over Argentina (8-5), but lost to Brazil (12-4) and Canada (13-10) to finish in fifth place. The debuting women's team also finished fifth in the tournament.

At the 2002 Central American and Caribbean Games held at San Salvador, El Salvador, only a men's event was sanctioned. There, Puerto Rico advanced over teams including Colombia before dropping a close final to Mexico, 6-7, to win the silver medal. Returning to action at the 2003 Pan American Games, the men's finished fourth and the women's fifth. The program recorded its weakest showing of the decade at the 2006 Central American Games, losing to Venezuela (8-9), Cuba (21-7) and Colombia (8-12), defeating Trinidad and Tobago twice (16-5 and 22-3) and Mexico (12-9), to finish fifth. During this time a club competition, the 2006 Caribbean Island Swimming Championships, was held at Caguas and Salinas. At 2007 Pan American Games, the men's side finished 8th while the women repeated its previous performance at fifth place. Puerto Rico hosted the 2010 Central American and Caribbean Games at Mayagüez. There the men's team scored wins over the Netherlands Antilles (21-1), Guatemala (19-6), Trinidad and Tobago (16-10) and Venezuela (10-8) and losses to Colombia (6-11) and Mexico (6-7) to advance to the bronze medal game, which they lost 7-9 to finish in the fourth place. The women's team defeated Venezuela (11–7 and 15–8) and Mexico (19–3 and 11–10) twice to advance to the final round, where it defeated the South American team again with scores of 12–6 to win the gold medal. During this time, swimmer Zul Y. García investigated the situation of water polo and other water sports in Puerto Rico, using the data acquired to elaborate the public relations book Relacionistas Deportivos.

=== Natural disasters and infrastructure challenges (2011–2021) ===
At the 2011 Pan American Games held at Guadalajara, the men's team qualified but ultimately withdrew without competing. The women lost to Cuba 12–13 and the United States 4-24, but defeated Argentina 12-6 and Venezuela 11-6. The team defeated Mexico 15-13 in a final game for the tournament's fifth spot. The program returned to action at the 2014 Central American and Caribbean Games at Veracruz. The men's team opened with a win over Trinidad and Tobago 16-9, but lost to Venezuela (8-10), Cuba (8-14) and Colombia (8-13). Following another win over Guatemala (14-2) and a loss against the host nation (4-13), Puerto Rico defeated Trinidad and Tobago (13-12) to secure the fifth place. The women's side defeated Mexico (9-8), Cuba (12-8) and Guatemala (26-3), only losing to Venezuela 10-11 to advance. Puerto Rico defeated Cuba 8-7 in the semifinals, losing to Venezuela (6-11) in the final to win the silver medal. In February 2015, Puerto Rico competed at the 13th South Florida International Water Polo Tournament at the Coral Springs Aquatic Complex, winning the boy's U16 and men's U19, while the women's team won bronze in their category. Francisco Vargas was contracted by La Latina Madrid to play professionally in Spain. For the 2015 Pan American Games at Toronto, the men's team withdrew once again following the classification. The women's side opened with an 11-11 draw against Venezuela, this was followed by losses to Canada (5-19) and Brazil (10-17). Puerto Rico defeated Argentina 14-6 and Mexico 12-11 to finish fifth. Puerto Rico won the 2017 U18 CCCAN championships. The subsequent strike of hurricane Maria during the summer of 2017 placed all Puerto Rican swimming in a dire situation, with the local infrastructure being devastated and taking years to completely replace. The program used this time to organize a nucleus of players for its men's team, which spent time playing and training together for the next decade.

At the 2018 Central American and Caribbean Games in Barranquilla, both teams competed. The men's opened with loses to Colombia (10-13) and Mexico (9-11), but defeated Jamaica (15-0) to advance. Puerto Rico won its quarterfinal over Venezuela (8-6), but lost the semifinal to Colombia (6-8). The team defeated Mexico 11-10 to win the tournament's bronze medal. The women's side advanced with wins over Mexico (14–12), Colombia (20–6), Venezuela (16–6) and Trinidad and Tobago (29–5), winning the semifinal over Venezuela (6-16). In the semifinal Puerto Rico defeated Venezuela (16–6), but lost the final to Cuba (5-12) to win the silver medal. This was the last tournament for the Ortiz sisters, the quartet of Cristina, Alejandra, Amanda and Angélica retired afterwards. The reopening of the San Juan Natatorium allowed it to host the 2019 Junior Pan American Championships. Returning to action at the 2019 Pan American Games held at Lima, the men's team struggled with losses to Canada (7-20), Cuba (8-10), the United States (1-24) and Brazil (4-15) in the classification game. Its sole win in the tournament was over Mexico (5-8) and lost to Cuba (7-8) in the game for the fifth place. The women's side lost to the United States (3-23) and Brazil (8-12), defeated Venezuela (9-5). The team lost to Cuba (5-14) in the classification, also winning over Peru (15-4). In the game for the fifth place Puerto Rico defeated Mexico 13-12 in a penalty shootout (PSO).

=== Regional champions (2023–present) ===
A series of earthquakes that took place in 2020 also further affected the infrastructure, but the COVID-19 pandemic was what prevented the practice of water polo for a prolonged time since only standard swimming was allowed without approval and being classified as a contact sport kept it sidelined. Instead, focus was given to continue training a stable nucleus of player that stayed together since the mid-2010s. In February 2021, Escuela de los Deportes Germán Rieckehoff Sampayo resumed its water polo classes for students. The following month the prohibition on water polo competitions was lifted. The program restarted with the Puerto Rico Water Polo Open held at the San Juan Natatorium in August 2021. That year the federation also debuted the Torneo Internacional de Polo Acuático Playero Pro Classic, which the men's team won in 2022, while the Water Polo Superior (WPS) debuted in 2022, being played in venues throughout Puerto Rico. After a recess caused by a number of competitors being abroad, and resumed in 2024. Its Open Water Commission scouted Playa Punta Arena at Cabo Rojo, which it considered adequate for international beach water polo competitions. In August 2021, water polo was competed in as part of the broader Puerto Rico International Swimming Open. Water polo was also included as part of the lineup of the Juegos de Puerto Rico, a school tournament sponsored by the Puerto Rico Department of Sports and Recreation. The same agency sponsored the sport during the DRD International Series 2022. The WPS teams competed at the Caribbean Beach Waterpolo Invitational Classic, which Puerto Rico won on the women's side. The International Series Caribbean Beach Water Polo Invitational was also held at Balneario El Escambrón.

The program participated in the Central American and Caribbean Swimming Federation (CCCAN) championships on the men's category, opening with wins over Bahamas (27-2), Trinidad & Tobago (28-6) and México (12-11) in the pool phase, further advancing over Barbados (25-1) in the quarterfinals and besting Trinidad y Tobago (30-0) in a semifinal rematch. Puerto Rico won the gold medal by defeating Mexico (12–8) in the final of the open category. In March 2023, the second International Beach Water Polo Pro Classic was held at Punta Salinas at Toa Baja. Water polo was included in the lineup Festival Playero y Deportivo 2023. Competing at the 2023 Central American and Caribbean Games held at San Salvador, El Salvador, the men's national team debuted with wins over Venezuela (24–7), El Salvador (27–3) and Bahamas (23–7). In the semifinals, Puerto Rico defeated Mexico 11–8 and went on to win its first gold medal by defeating Cuba 9-8. The women's tournament was cancelled in May 2023, when Trinidad and Tobago withdrew from competition. A boy's team participated at the U15 Pan American Championships held at Lima in August 2023.

At the 2023 Pan American Games, the women lost to Brazil (7-19) and the United States, but defeated Chile twice to finish seventh. The men's team opened with a 5-18 loss to Brazil, but advanced to the quarterfinals where a loss to Argentina (9-20) sent them to the consolation round where it bested Chile for the fifth place. Former program player Manuel Antonio de Jesús Benítez was the event's water polo technical director. Milena Guzmán was contracted to play at the Spanish División de Honor Femenina by Club Natació Catalunya from Barcelona and later Club Deportivo Waterpolo Iruña 9802. For its return, the WPS held a draft at Arena Medalla in the Puerto Rico Convention Center, in which the Laguneros de Trujillo Alto, Metropolitan de Loyola, Orcas de San Juan and Gigantes de Carolina participated on the men's division and Gigantes de Carolina, Laguneras de Trujillo Alto and Orcas de San Juan in the women's division. In July 2024, the program was invited to participate at the world qualifier that was held at Ibagué, Colombia during the fall. In August 2024, former program player Luis Fuster organized the first edition of the Puerto Rico Elite Water Polo Tournament was held at the San Juan Natatorium, with the Puerto Rico Mix defeating the Florida Golden Girls in the final of the women's division 14–7 and San Juan's University Athletic Club defeating Laguneros de Trujillo Alto 10–9 after dispatching the Floridian representatives. The men's team defeated Bahamas in the final to win the regional U16 Youth Championships.

The women's team participated at the 2024 PanAm Aquatics Youth Elite Qualifiers, opening with a 19–6 win. Led by five goals by Milena Guzmán, the team defeated Trinidad and Tobago during the group stage. In November 2024, Gigantes de Carolina became the first team to win both branches of the WPS in the same season. After FINA revised its water polo rules, these were first implemented locally in the 2025 WPS season. The league also debuted its All-Star Game, held at the San Juan Natatorium. In August 2025, the first edition of the Prosport Water Polo Tournament was held in the venue. In December 2025, Javier González, Alex Mujica and Luis Limardo were inducted into the Collegiate Water Polo Association's (CWPA) Hall of Fame. Puerto Rico began its preparations for 2026 in October 2025, preparing for a qualifying tournament held at Cali, Colombia. The men's team qualified by closing the pool phase with a 22–8 win over Venezuela and besting Mexico in the semifinal (13-8), while the women defeated Trinidad and Tobago (24–4) and Colombia (10–7) in the semifinals. Both teams finished the event with silver medals. In April 2026, the Beach Water Polo Classic returned, with the festival being held at La Monserrate beach at Luquillo, Puerto Rico.

Competing at the 2026 World Aquatics Men's U16 Championships, the men's team won its debut over Uruguay (8–6) but closed with 8-10 and 9-18 losses to Cuba and Mexico during the group stage, also dropping two games to the North American representatives of the United States (1-24) and Canada (7-20) to finish in the 35th place. At the 2026 Central American and Caribbean Games held at Santo Domingo, Dominican Republic, the men's team opened on an undefeated streak of 6–0 which included an 18-12 win over Cuba, advancing over the Dominican Republic (28–3) in the quarterfinal and besting Cuba (13-12) again in the semifinal. The team successfully defended its title by defeating Colombia 16-11 in the final. In the preliminary phase the team bested Mexico (12–6) and Guatemala (29-4). Led by Milena Guzmán women's side also repeated in the podium, this time winning the bronze medal by defeating Cuba 10-4, having lost to Colombia (11-13) in the semifinal. During the preliminary phase, they scored wins over Guatemala (22-3), Cuba (15–5) and Colombia (11-10) and a loss against Mexico (13-18).

== National teams ==
- Puerto Rico men's national water polo team
- Puerto Rico women's national water polo team
