= Athletics at the Central American and Caribbean Games =

Athletics was a sport at the inaugural Central American Games in 1926 (later renamed the Central American and Caribbean Games) and it has remained part of the event's sporting programme throughout its history.

== Editions ==
Games	Year	Host city	Host country	Main venue	Events		Nations	Athletes	Best nation
Games	Year	Host city	Host country	Main venue	Men	Women	Nations	Athletes	Best nation
I	1926	Mexico City	Mexico	Estadio Nacional	20	—			Mexico (MEX)
II	1930	Havana	Cuba		20	—			Cuba (CUB)
III	1935	San Salvador	El Salvador		20	—			Cuba (CUB)
IV	1938	Panama City	Panama	Estadio J.D. Arosemena	21	6			Puerto Rico (PUR)
V	1946	Barranquilla	Colombia		21	7			Panama (PAN)
VI	1950	Guatemala City	Guatemala		21	7			Jamaica (JAM)
VII	1954	Mexico City	Mexico		22	6			Cuba (CUB)
VIII	1959	Caracas	Venezuela		22	6			Mexico (MEX)
IX	1962	Kingston	Jamaica		22	7			Cuba (CUB)
X	1966	San Juan	Puerto Rico		23	9			Cuba (CUB)
XI	1970	Panama City	Panama		23	12			Cuba (CUB)
XII	1974	Santo Domingo	Dominican Republic	Estadio Olímpico Juan Pablo Duarte	23	12	21	278	Cuba (CUB)
XIII	1978	Medellín	Colombia	Estadio Atanasio Girardot	23	14			Cuba (CUB)
XIV	1982	Havana	Cuba	Estadio Pedro Marrero	24	16			Cuba (CUB)
XV	1986	Santiago	Dominican Republic	Estadio La Barranquita	24	19			Cuba (CUB)
XVI	1990	Mexico City	Mexico	Estadio Olímpico Universitario	24	19	28	294	Cuba (CUB)
XVII	1993	Ponce	Puerto Rico	Estadio Francisco Montaner	24	19	30	287	Cuba (CUB)
XVIII	1998	Maracaibo	Venezuela	Estadio José Pachencho Romero	24	22	31	436	Cuba (CUB)
XIX	2002	San Salvador	El Salvador	Estadio Nacional Flor Blanca	22	21	28	282	Mexico (MEX)
XX	2006	Cartagena	Colombia	Estadio Pedro de Heredia	22	21	31	444	Cuba (CUB)
XXI	2010	Mayagüez	Puerto Rico	Mayagüez Athletics Stadium	24	23	30	431	Jamaica (JAM)
XXII	2014	Veracruz	Mexico	Estadio H.J. Corona	24	23	31	417	Cuba (CUB)
XXIII	2018	Barranquilla	Colombia	Estadio Metropolitano	24	22	35	468	Colombia (COL)
XXIV	2023	San Salvador	El Salvador	Estadio Jorge "El Mágico" González	24	22	30	400	Cuba (CUB)
XXV	2026	Santo Domingo	Dominican Republic	Estadio Olímpico Félix Sánchez	23	24	30	439	Dominican Republic (DOM)

== See also ==
- List of Central American and Caribbean Games records in athletics
- List of Central American and Caribbean Games medalists in athletics
