= Water polo at the Central American and Caribbean Games =

Event at the Central American and Caribbean Games

Water polo was first introduced to the program of the Central American and Caribbean Games (CACGs) in 1938 in Panama City, and has been contested at every edition since.

== Results summary ==
=== Men's tournament ===
Games	Gold	Silver	Bronze
1938 Panama City	Jamaica (JAM)	Panama (PAN)	Puerto Rico (PUR)
1946 Barranquilla	Caribbean Netherlands (AHO)	Colombia (COL)	Mexico (MEX)
1950 Guatemala City	Mexico (MEX)	Caribbean Netherlands (AHO)	Guatemala (GUA)
1954 Mexico City	Mexico (MEX)	Jamaica (JAM)	Panama (PAN)
1959 Caracas	Mexico (MEX)	Jamaica (JAM)	Venezuela (VEN)
1962 Kingston	Mexico (MEX)	Jamaica (JAM)	Barbados (BAR)
1966 San Juan	Cuba (CUB)	Mexico (MEX)	Colombia (COL)
1970 Panama City	Cuba (CUB)	Mexico (MEX)	Colombia (COL)
1974 Santo Domingo	Cuba (CUB)	Mexico (MEX)	Colombia (COL)
1978 Medellín	Cuba (CUB)	Mexico (MEX)	Puerto Rico (PUR)
1982 Havana	Cuba (CUB)	Mexico (MEX)	Puerto Rico (PUR)
1986 Santiago	Cuba (CUB)	Puerto Rico (PUR)	Mexico (MEX)
1990 Mexico City	Cuba (CUB)	Mexico (MEX)	Puerto Rico (PUR)
1993 Ponce	Cuba (CUB)	Mexico (MEX)	Puerto Rico (PUR)
1998 Maracaibo	Cuba (CUB)	Puerto Rico (PUR)	Mexico (MEX)
2002 San Salvador	Mexico (MEX)	Puerto Rico (PUR)	Colombia (COL)
2006 Cartagena	Cuba (CUB)	Colombia (COL)	Mexico (MEX)
2010 Mayagüez	Colombia (COL)	Venezuela (VEN)	Mexico (MEX)
2014 Veracruz	Mexico (MEX)	Venezuela (VEN)	Cuba (CUB)
2018 Barranquilla	Colombia (COL)	Cuba (CUB)	Puerto Rico (PUR)
2023 San Salvador	Puerto Rico (PUR)	Cuba (CUB)	Mexico (MEX)
2026 Santo Domingo	Puerto Rico (PUR)	Colombia (COL)	Mexico (MEX)

=== Women's tournament ===
Games	Gold	Silver	Bronze
2006 Cartagena	Cuba (CUB)	Puerto Rico (PUR)	Venezuela (VEN)
2010 Mayagüez	Puerto Rico (PUR)	Venezuela (VEN)	Mexico (MEX)
2014 Veracruz	Venezuela (VEN)	Puerto Rico (PUR)	Cuba (CUB)
2018 Barranquilla	Cuba (CUB)	Puerto Rico (PUR)	Mexico (MEX)
2023 San Salvador	There was no competition		
2026 Santo Domingo	Colombia (COL)	Mexico (MEX)	Puerto Rico (PUR)
