= Mariana Cifuentes =

Mexican synchronized swimmer

Personal information
- Full name: Mariana Aneth Cifuentes Castro
- Nickname: marchana
- Nationality: Mexico
- Born: 18 May 1987 (age 39) Guadalajara, Mexico
- Height: 1.67 m (5 ft 6 in)
- Weight: 50 kg (110 lb)

Sport
- Sport: Swimming
- Strokes: Synchronized swimming
- Club: atlas
Medal record
Representing Mexico
Synchronized swimming
Central American and Caribbean Games
Gold medal – first place	2006 Cartagena	Women's team
Gold medal – first place	2006 Cartagena	Women's combination
- Updated on 22 May 2015

Mariana Cifuentes (born 18 May 1987) is a retired Mexican synchronized swimmer. She competed in the women's duet at the 2008 Summer Olympics as well as three editions of the Central American and Caribbean Games, where she won a total of eight gold medals. She also took part in two Pan American Games and won the bronze medal in the 2014 FINA Synchronized Swimming World Cup in the Team Highlight event. After a career of 18 years, she retired in 2015. She is part of the Sports Hall of Fame of the state of Jalisco, being admitted in 2018
