= Synchronized swimming at the 2006 Central American and Caribbean Games =

Synchronized Swimming at the 2006 Central American and Caribbean Games
- Location: (Colombia) Cartagena
- Dates: 15-30 July

The Synchronized swimming competition at the 2006 Central American and Caribbean Games was held in Cartagena, Colombia. The tournament was scheduled to be held from 15 to 30 July 2006.

== Medal summary ==
Event	Gold		Silver		Bronze	
Solo	Kenia Perez (CUB)	85.600	Olga Vargas (MEX)	85.400	Jennifer Cerquera (COL)	82.950
Duet	Cuba; Kenia Perez; Yamisleidys Romay	86.100	Mexico; Nara Falcon; Isabel Delgado	85.100	Colombia; Jennifer Cerquera; Ingrid Cubillos	82.000
Team	Mexico; Mariana Cifuentes; Isabel Delgado; Nuria Diosdado; Nara Falcon; Norma Franco; Evelyn Guajardo; Angela Quemain; Marlene Vazquez; Lourdes Medina; Olga Vargas	86.450	Cuba; Joanna Arias; Mailenes Castillo; Tania Cruz; Ailin Diaz; Adriana Lastre; Rina Lora; Barbara Luna; Darlys Rodriguez; Yamisleidys Romay; Kenia Perez	84.533	Colombia; Ailin Alegria; Asly Alegria; Margarita Betancourt; Jennifer Cerquera; Ingrid Cubillos; Ana Giraldo; Maria Reyna; Diana Rozo; Irina Rueda; Maritza Valencia	82.850
Combination	Mexico; Mariana Cifuentes; Isabel Delgado; Nuria Diosdado; Nara Falcon; Norma Franco; Evelyn Guajardo; Angela Quemain; Marlene Vazquez; Lourdes Medina; Olga Vargas	86.600	Colombia; Ailin Alegria; Asly Alegria; Margarita Betancourt; Jennifer Cerquera; Ingrid Cubillos; Ana Giraldo; Maria Reyna; Diana Rozo; Irina Rueda; Maritza Valencia	83.900	Cuba; Joanna Arias; Mailenes Castillo; Tania Cruz; Ailin Diaz; Adriana Lastre; Rina Lora; Barbara Luna; Darlys Rodriguez; Yamisleidys Romay; Kenia Perez	83.600

== Medal table ==
* Host nation (Colombia)

Rank	Nation	Gold	Silver	Bronze	Total
1	Mexico	2	2	0	4
2	Cuba	2	1	1	4
3	Colombia*	0	1	3	4
Totals (3 entries)		4	4	4	12
