= Water polo at the 1954 Central American and Caribbean Games =

Medalists
gold medal	Mexico
silver medal	Jamaica
bronze medal	Panama

Water polo was contested for men only at the 1954 Central American and Caribbean Games in Mexico City, Mexico.

Event	Gold	Silver	Bronze
Men's water polo	Mexico (MEX)	Jamaica (JAM)	Panama (PAN)
