= Water polo at the 1959 Central American and Caribbean Games =

Medalists
gold medal	Mexico
silver medal	Jamaica
bronze medal	Venezuela

Water polo was contested for men only at the 1959 Central American and Caribbean Games in Caracas, Venezuela.

Event	Gold	Silver	Bronze
Men's water polo	Mexico (MEX)	Jamaica (JAM)	Venezuela (VEN)
