= Water polo at the 1962 Central American and Caribbean Games =

Medalists
gold medal	Mexico
silver medal	Jamaica
bronze medal	Barbados

Water polo was contested for men only at the 1962 Central American and Caribbean Games in Kingston, Jamaica.

Event	Gold	Silver	Bronze
Men's water polo	Mexico (MEX)	Jamaica (JAM)	Barbados (BAR)
