= Cycling at the Central American and Caribbean Games =

Cycling at the Central American and Caribbean Games may refer to:

- Cycling at the 1998 Central American and Caribbean Games
- Cycling at the 2002 Central American and Caribbean Games
- Cycling at the 2006 Central American and Caribbean Games
- Cycling at the 2010 Central American and Caribbean Games
- Cycling at the 2014 Central American and Caribbean Games
- Cycling at the 2018 Central American and Caribbean Games
