= 2025 Central American and Caribbean Beach Games =

Multi-sport event in Costa Rica

- Nations: 32
- Athletes: 1500
- Events: 47 in 19 sports
- Opening: TBD
- Closing: TBD
- Opened by: President Rodrigo Chaves Robles

The 2025 Central American and Caribbean Beach Games (Spanish: Juegos Centroamericanos y de Caribe de Mar y Playa), officially the II Central American and Caribbean Beach Games, will be an international multi-sport event held in Puntarenas, Costa Rica. The games are overseen by Centro Caribe Sports (formerly CACSO).

== Participating teams ==
32 nations and dependencies competed in these Beach Games.

Below is a list of all the participating NOCs. The number of competitors per delegation is indicated in brackets.

Participating National Olympic Committees
- Costa Rica (16) (host)

== Sports ==
- Beach athletics ()
- Beach handball ()
- Beach rugby ()
- Beach soccer ()
- Beach tennis ()
- Beach volleyball ()
- Beach wrestling ()
- Open water swimming ()
- Sailing ()
- Skateboarding ()
- Surfing ()

== Medal table ==
* Host nation (Costa Rica)

2025 Central American and Caribbean Beach Games medal table
Rank	NOC	Gold	Silver	Bronze	Total
1	Costa Rica (CRC)*	0	0	0	0
Totals (1 entries)		0	0	0	0
