= Basque pelota at the 2014 Central American and Caribbean Games =

Basque Pelota at the 2014 Central American and Caribbean Games
- Location: Veracruz, Mexico

The Basque Pelota competition at the 2014 Central American and Caribbean Games was held in Veracruz, Mexico.

The tournament was scheduled to be held from 18–23 November at the Basque Pelota Pavilion.

== Medal summary ==
=== Men's events ===
| Event | Gold | Silver | Bronze |
|---|---|---|---|
| 30 m Paleta Rubber Individual | Mexico (MEX); Alberto Rodriguez; Arturo Rodriguez | Cuba (CUB); Jhoan Torreblanca; Armando Chappi | Venezuela (VEN); Jaime Vera; Jesus Zarraga |
| 30 m Frontenis Doubles | Mexico (MEX); Arturo Rodriguez; Hector Rodriguez; Alberto Rodriguez | Cuba (CUB); Armando Chappi; Rafael Fernandez; Jhoan Torreblanca | Venezuela (VEN); Jose Pina; Jesus Zarraga; Jaime Vera |

=== Women's events ===
| Event | Gold | Silver | Bronze |
|---|---|---|---|
| 30 m Paleta Rubber Doubles | Mexico (MEX); Rosa Flores; Paulina Castillo; Ariana Cepeda; Guadalupe Hernandez | Venezuela (VEN); Estibaliz Barreda; Rosa Diaz; Diana Rangel; Maria Borges | Cuba (CUB); Daniela Darriba; Leyanis Castillo; Yasmary Medina; Lisandra Lima |
| 30 m Frontenis Doubles | Mexico (MEX); Guadalupe Hernandez; Ariana Cepeda; Paulina Castillo; Rosa Flores | Cuba (CUB); Yasmary Medina; Lisandra Lima; Daniela Darriba; Leyanis Castillo | Venezuela (VEN); Diana Rangel; Maria Borges; Estibaliz Barreda; Rosa Diaz |

== Medal table ==
* Host nation (Mexico)

| Rank | Nation | Gold | Silver | Bronze | Total |
|---|---|---|---|---|---|
| 1 | Mexico* | 4 | 0 | 0 | 4 |
| 2 | Cuba | 0 | 3 | 1 | 4 |
| 3 | Venezuela | 0 | 1 | 3 | 4 |
| Totals (3 entries) | | 4 | 4 | 4 | 12 |
