= Water polo at the 1993 Central American and Caribbean Games =

Medalists
gold medal	Cuba
silver medal	Mexico
bronze medal	Puerto Rico

Water polo was contested for men only at the 1993 Central American and Caribbean Games in Ponce, Puerto Rico.

Event	Gold	Silver	Bronze
Men's water polo	Cuba (CUB)	Mexico (MEX)	Puerto Rico (PUR)
