= Water polo at the 2002 Central American and Caribbean Games =

Medalists
gold medal	Mexico
silver medal	Puerto Rico
bronze medal	Colombia

Water polo was contested for men only at the 2002 Central American and Caribbean Games in San Salvador, El Salvador.

Event	Gold	Silver	Bronze
Men's water polo	Mexico (MEX)	Puerto Rico (PUR)	Colombia (COL)
