= Softball at the 2014 Central American and Caribbean Games =

- Venue: Carlos Cerdan Arechavaleta Sports Unit
- Location: Veracruz
- Dates: 16 – 30 November

The softball competition at the 2014 Central American and Caribbean Games was held in Veracruz, Mexico.

The tournament was scheduled to be held from 16–30 November at the Carlos Cerdan Arechavaleta Sports Unit.

== Medal summary ==
Event	Gold	Silver	Bronze
Men’s tournament	Venezuela (VEN); Herwims Querales; Franklin Gonzalez; Jorge Lima; Luiger Pinto; Ruben Guerrero; Erick Alvarez; Ramon Jones; Arturo Acacio; John Garcia; Erick Urbaneja; Iran Paez; John Zambrano; Carlos Ojeda; Anthony Pineda; Edwin Linares; Rafael Flores; Yeider Chirinos	Mexico (MEX); Jesus Medina Fraijo; Alan Salgado Carrillo; Marco Gonzalez; Jesus Mora Higuera; Erick Ochoa Vazquez; Edgar Lopez; Mario Perez Leon; Samuel Villalvazo; Ernesto Sánchez; Ruben Delgadillo; Jose Raymundo Aguila; William Prishker; Jesus Cardona; Jesus Gonzalez; Julio Cesar Rodriguez; Eduardo Escobedo; Carlos Ordaz Lopez	Cuba (CUB); Yesander Rodriguez; Alexey Tejeda; Jorge Reguera; Alain Roman Gonzalez; Juan Carlos Rodriguez; Roberto Echarte Leiva; Alexis Navarro Alfaro; Edward Laverdeza Roque; Yerisander Ramos Suarez; Reinier Vera Mesa; Edward Hernandez Perez; Alexander Alvarez Viera; Guber Plutin Quintero; Juan Yasmani Rios Fabars; Guillermo Marquez; Javier Caballero; Mario Oliva
Women’s tournament	Dominican Republic (DOM); Rosaura Perez; Lidiseth Soto; Auraeliza Tejeda; Geraldina Feliz; Yanela Gomez; Maria Toribio; Elizabeth Vicioso; Marivel Pie; Anabel Ulloa; Josefina Mercedes; Danelis Ramirez; Consuelo Payero; Rosangela Rodriguez; Karina de los Santos; Dharianna Familia; Geovanny Nunez; Yudelca Matos	Cuba (CUB); Marta Torres; Ludisleydis Napoles; Yoandra Espinosa; Anisley Lopez; Katia Coello; Geidis Garcia; Yanitza Aviles; Yarianna Lopez; Yilian Tornes; Maritza Toledo; Yanisleidys Casanova; Yuselys Acosta; Tatiana Lorenzo; Yilian Rondon; Diamela Puentes; Leanneyi Gomez; Yusmeri Pacheco	Colombia (COL); Vianys Garcia; Claudia Quintero; Morgan Nandin; Diana Urzola; Lean Chelsa; Erika Diaz; Kerlyn Guzman; Jennifer Garcia; Danisha Livingston; Karina Rios; Solibeth Nunez; Ana Olivo; Libis Hurtado; Monica Garcia; Darlys Perez; Beatriz Cudriz; Johana Gomez

== Medal table ==
* Host nation (Mexico)

Rank	Nation	Gold	Silver	Bronze	Total
1	Dominican Republic (DOM)	1	0	0	1
1	Venezuela (VEN)	1	0	0	1
3	Cuba (CUB)	0	1	1	2
4	Mexico (MEX)*	0	1	0	1
5	Colombia (COL)	0	0	1	1
Totals (5 entries)		2	2	2	6
