= Beach volleyball at the 2018 Central American and Caribbean Games =

- Venue: Puerta de Oro Center
- Location: (Colombia) Barranquilla
- Dates: 28 July – 1 August

The beach volleyball competition at the 2018 Central American and Caribbean Games was held in Barranquilla, Colombia from 28 July to 1 August at the Puerta de Oro Center.

== Medal summary ==
Event	Gold	Silver	Bronze
Men's tournament	Cuba (CUB); Sergio González; Nivaldo Díaz	Mexico (MEX); Juan Virgen; Rodolfo Ontiveros	Colombia (COL); Johan Murray; Jorge Manjarres
Women's tournament	Cuba (CUB); Leila Martínez; Maylén Delís	Colombia (COL); Diana Ríos; Yuli Ayala	Venezuela (VEN); Norisbeth Agudo; Gabriela Brito

== Medal table ==
* Host nation (Colombia)

Rank	Nation	Gold	Silver	Bronze	Total
1	Cuba (CUB)	2	0	0	2
2	Colombia (COL)*	0	1	1	2
3	Mexico (MEX)	0	1	0	1
4	Venezuela (VEN)	0	0	1	1
Totals (4 entries)		2	2	2	6
