= Water skiing at the 2010 Central American and Caribbean Games =

Event held in Mayagüez, Puerto Rico

- Location: Bogota
- Dates: July 24

The Water skiing competition at the 2010 Central American and Caribbean Games was held in Mayagüez, Puerto Rico.

The tournament was scheduled to be held on 24 July at Bogotá in Colombia.

== Medal summary ==
=== Men's events ===
Event	Gold	Silver	Bronze
Slalom	Jose Fernando Mesa (COL)	Álvaro Lamadrid (MEX)	Santiago Correa (COL)
