= Volleyball at the 1959 Central American and Caribbean Games =

Volleyball events were contested at the 1959 Central American and Caribbean Games in Caracas, Venezuela.

Event	Gold	Silver	Bronze
Men's volleyball	Mexico (MEX)	Venezuela (VEN)	Puerto Rico (PUR)
Women's volleyball	Mexico (MEX)	Venezuela (VEN)	Netherlands Antilles (AHO)
