= Water skiing at the 2006 Central American and Caribbean Games =

- Location: Cartagena
- Dates: July 15-30

The Water skiing competition at the 2006 Central American and Caribbean Games was held in Cartagena, Colombia. The tournament was scheduled to be held from 15–30 July 2006.

== Medal summary ==
=== Men's events ===
Event	Gold	Silver	Bronze
Slalom	Arturo Nelson (MEX)	Jose Mesa (COL)	Diego Delgado (COL)
