= Softball at the 1993 Central American and Caribbean Games =

Softball at the 1993 Central American and Caribbean Games was one of many sports at the seventeenth games in Ponce, Puerto Rico from 19 to 30 November 1993. It was the seventh time softball was an event at the Central American and Caribbean Games. There were two tournaments, one for men and one for women. Cuba won the men's tournament, and Puerto Rico won the women's tournament.

== Medals ==
at the 1993 Central American and Caribbean Games, Ponce
1.	CUB	1	0	1	2
2.	PRI	1	0	0	1
3.	COL	0	1	0	1
3.	DOM	0	1	0	1
5.	VEN	0	0	1	1
Total		2	2	2	6
