= Water polo at the 1950 Central American and Caribbean Games =

Medalists
gold medal	Mexico
silver medal	Netherlands Antilles
bronze medal	Guatemala

Water polo was contested for men only at the 1950 Central American and Caribbean Games in Guatemala City, Guatemala.

== Results ==
Event	Gold	Silver	Bronze
Men's water polo	Mexico (MEX)	Caribbean Netherlands (AHO)	Guatemala (GUA)
