= Roller skating at the 2006 Central American and Caribbean Games =

- Location: (Colombia) Cartagena
- Dates: 15-30 July

The Roller skating competition at the 2006 Central American and Caribbean Games was held in Cartagena, Colombia. The tournament was scheduled to be held from 15 to 30 July 2006.

== Medal summary ==
=== Men's events ===
==== Road ====
Event	Gold	Silver	Bronze
200 m Time Trial	Jeisson Martans (COL)	Juan Jardine (VEN)	Dayron Pineda (CUB)
1000 m	Jorge Cifuentes (COL)	Nelson Garzon (COL)	Daniel Alvarez (VEN)
5000 m	Anderson Ariza (COL)	Jorge Cifuentes (COL)	Tony Garcia (CUB)
20000 m	Nelson Garzon (COL)	Jorge Cifuentes (COL)	Daniel Alvarez (VEN)
42 km Marathon	Anderson Ariza (COL)	Jose Bastidas (VEN)	Tony Garcia (CUB)

==== Track ====
Event	Gold	Silver	Bronze
300 m Time Trial	Jorge Cifuentes (COL)	Juan Jardine (VEN)	Alan Coronado (MEX)
500 m	Jorge Cifuentes (COL)	Fabian Arcila (VEN)	Juan Jardine (VEN)
5000 m Relay	Colombia; Jorge Cifuentes; Anderson Ariza; Nelson Garzon	Venezuela; Juan Jardine; Daniel Alvarez; Fabian Arcila	Mexico; Rene Beltran; Hugo Mondragon; Carlos Pina
10000 m	Nelson Garzon (COL)	Daniel Alvarez (VEN)	Anderson Ariza (COL)
15000 m Elimination	Nelson Garzon (COL)	Jose Bastidas (VEN)	Daniel Alvarez (VEN)

=== Women's events ===
==== Road ====
Event	Gold	Silver	Bronze
200 m Time Trial	Cecilia Baena (COL)	Veronica Elias (MEX)	Yelitza Mora (VEN)
1000 m	Berenice Moreno (COL)	Cecilia Baena (COL)	Veronica Elias (MEX)
5000 m Points Race	Alexandra Vivas (COL)	Silvia Nino (COL)	Veronica Elias (MEX)
20000 m	Silvia Nino (COL)	Alexandra Vivas (COL)	Diana Platero (ESA)
42 km Marathon	Silvia Nino (COL)	Berenice Moreno (COL)	Veronica Elias (MEX)

==== Track ====
Event	Gold	Silver	Bronze
300 m Time Trial	Cecilia Baena (COL)	Jeimy Valencia (VEN)	Diana Platero (ESA)
500 m	Berenice Moreno (COL)	Cecilia Baena (COL)	Jeimy Valencia (VEN)
5000 m Relay	Colombia; Berenice Moreno; Cecila Baena; Alexandra Vivas	Venezuela; Jeimy Valencia; Wildreina Valbuena; Yelitza Mora	Mexico; Veronica Elias; Rocio Estrella; Maria Castillo
10000 m Combined	Silvia Nino (COL)	Alexandra Vivas (COL)	Diana Platero (ESA)
15000 m Elimination	Alexandra Vivas (COL)	Silvia Nino (COL)	Wildreina Valbuena (VEN)

== Medal table ==
* Host nation (Colombia)

Rank	Nation	Gold	Silver	Bronze	Total
1	Colombia*	20	10	1	31
2	Venezuela	0	9	7	16
3	Mexico	0	1	6	7
4	Cuba	0	0	3	3
4	El Salvador	0	0	3	3
Totals (5 entries)		20	20	20	60
