= Roller skating at the 2010 Central American and Caribbean Games =

Event held in Mayagüez, Puerto Rico

- Location: (Puerto Rico) Mayagüez
- Dates: 18-22 July

The Roller skating competition at the 2010 Central American and Caribbean Games was being held in Mayagüez, Puerto Rico.

The tournament was scheduled to be held from 18–22 July in the country of Colombia.

== Medal summary ==
=== Men's events ===
Event	Gold		Silver		Bronze	
200m Time Trial	Andrés Muñoz; Colombia	16.440	Felipe Castillo; Venezuela	16.560	Pedro Causil; Colombia	16.640
300m Time Trial	Pedro Causil; Colombia	25:52.070	Andrés Muñoz; Colombia	26:07.000	Gerardo Galviz; Venezuela	26:13.060
500m Time Trial	Andrés Muñoz; Colombia	42.990	Gerardo Galviz; Venezuela	43.310	Felipe Castillo; Venezuela	43.350
15000m Elimination	Oscar Cobo; Colombia		Jorge Luis Cifuentez; Colombia		Alexander Bastidas; Venezuela	
20000m Elimination	Jorge Luis Cifuentez; Colombia	36:03.620	Alexander Bastidas; Venezuela		Andrés Muñoz; Colombia	
10000m Elimination/Points	Jorge Luis Cifuentez; Colombia	28	Oscar Cobo; Colombia	21	Daniel Álvarez; Venezuela	16
1000m Group	Pedro Causil; Colombia	1:26.960	Andrés Muñoz; Colombia	1:27.080	Gerardo Galviz; Venezuela	1:27.610
10000m Points	Jorge Luis Cifuentez; Colombia	33	Daniel Álvarez; Venezuela	22	Oscar Cobo; Venezuela	10
3000m Relays	Colombia	4:18.715	Venezuela	4:18.990	Mexico	4:27.947
42km	Andrés Muñoz; Colombia		Jorge Luis Cifuentez; Colombia		Daniel Álvarez; Venezuela	

=== Women's events ===
Event	Gold		Silver		Bronze	
200m Time Trial	Elizabeth Arnedo; Colombia	18.570	Solymar Vivas; Venezuela	18.830	Verónica Elias; Mexico	18.850
300m Time Trial	Elizabeth Arnedo; Colombia	27:50.010	Alexandra Vivas; Colombia	28:27.060	yeime Valencia; Venezuela	28:06.070
500m Time Trial	Cecilia Baena; Colombia	46.890	Solymar Vivas; Venezuela	47.016	Elizabeth Arnedo; Colombia	47.097
15000m Elimination	Alexandra Vivas; Colombia	27:13.400	Kelly Martinez; Colombia		Sara Ervitti; Venezuela	
20000m Elimination	Alexandra Vivas; Colombia	36:49.090	Kelly Martinez; Venezuela		Wildreina Valbuena; Colombia	
10000m Elimination/Points	Kelly Martinez; Colombia	38	Alexandra Vivas; Colombia	32	Wildreina Valbuena; Venezuela	5
1000m Group	Cecilia Baena; Colombia	2:13.630	Elizabeth Arnedo; Colombia	2:13.730	Maria Eugenia Castillo; Mexico	2:13.900
10000m Points	Kelly Martinez; Colombia	40	Alexandra Vivas; Colombia	29	Daniela Luna; Mexico	2
3000m Relays	Colombia	4:46.655	Mexico	4:50.402	Venezuela	4:57.807
42km	Cecilia Baena; Colombia	1:10.184	Alexandra Vivas; Colombia		Kelly Martinez; Colombia	
