= Water polo at the 1966 Central American and Caribbean Games =

Medalists
gold medal	Cuba
silver medal	Mexico
bronze medal	Colombia

Water polo was contested for men only at the 1966 Central American and Caribbean Games in San Juan, Puerto Rico.

Event	Gold	Silver	Bronze
Men's water polo	Cuba (CUB)	Mexico (MEX)	Colombia (COL)
