= Olga Vargas =

Mexican synchronized swimmer (born 1980)

Personal information
- Full name: Olga Larissa Vargas León
- Nationality: Mexico
- Born: 18 March 1980 (age 46) Mexico City, Mexico
- Height: 165 cm (5 ft 5 in)
- Weight: 60 kg (130 lb)

Sport
- Sport: Swimming
- Strokes: Synchronized swimming

Olga Vargas (born 18 March 1980) is a Mexican former synchronized swimmer.

Olga competed in the women's duet at the 2004 Olympic Games with her partner Nara Falcón and finished in sixteenth place.
