= Beach volleyball at the 2014 Central American and Caribbean Games =

- Location: Veracruz, Mexico

The beach volleyball competition at the 2014 Central American and Caribbean Games was held in Veracruz, Mexico.

The tournament was scheduled to be held from 26–30 November at Marti Beach.

== Medal summary ==
Event	Gold	Silver	Bronze
Men’s tournament	Cuba (CUB); Sergio González; Nivaldo Diaz	Venezuela (VEN); Villafane Jesus; Jackson Henriquez	Mexico (MEX); Juan Ramon Virgen; Rodolfo Ontiveros
Women’s tournament	Cuba (CUB); Lianma Flores; Leila Martinez	Mexico (MEX); Bibiana Candelas; Martha Revuelta	Venezuela (VEN); Olaya Pazo; Norisbeth Agudo

== Medal table ==
* Host nation (Mexico)

Rank	Nation	Gold	Silver	Bronze	Total
1	Cuba (CUB)	2	0	0	2
2	Mexico (MEX)*	0	1	1	2
2	Venezuela (VEN)	0	1	1	2
Totals (3 entries)		2	2	2	6
