= Roller sports at the 2014 Central American and Caribbean Games =

Sports competition in Veracruz, Mexico

- Venue: Reino Magico Skating Rink
- Location: Veracruz, Mexico
- Dates: 18–19 November

The Roller sports competition at the 2014 Central American and Caribbean Games was held in Veracruz, Mexico.

The tournament was scheduled to be held from 18 to 19 November at the Reino Magico Skating Rink.

== Medal summary ==
=== Men's events ===
| Event | Gold | | Silver | | Bronze | |
|---|---|---|---|---|---|---|
| 300m Time Trial | Pedro Causil (COL) | 24.530 | Johan Guzman (VEN) | 24.890 | Jorge Martinez (MEX) | 24.910 |
| 500m | Pedro Causil (COL) | 42.040 | Johan Guzman (VEN) | 42.160 | Jorge Martinez (MEX) | 42.320 |
| 10000m Combined | Alex Cujavante (COL) | | Tony Garcia (CUB) | | Mike Paez (MEX) | |

=== Women's events ===
| Event | Gold | | Silver | | Bronze | |
|---|---|---|---|---|---|---|
| 300m Time Trial | Yersi Puello (COL) | 26.540 | Yarubi Bandres (VEN) | 27.320 | Veronica Elias (MEX) | 27.330 |
| 500m | Yarubi Bandres (VEN) | 46.780 | Veronica Elias (MEX) | 46.940 | Yersi Puello (COL) | 47.550 |
| 10000m Combined | Yenny Serrano (COL) | | Sindy Cortez (VEN) | | Dalia Soberanis (GUA) | |

== Medal table ==
* Host nation (Mexico)

| Rank | Nation | Gold | Silver | Bronze | Total |
|---|---|---|---|---|---|
| 1 | Colombia | 5 | 0 | 1 | 6 |
| 2 | Venezuela | 1 | 4 | 0 | 5 |
| 3 | Mexico* | 0 | 1 | 4 | 5 |
| 4 | Cuba | 0 | 1 | 0 | 1 |
| 5 | Guatemala | 0 | 0 | 1 | 1 |
| Totals (5 entries) | | 6 | 6 | 6 | 18 |
