= Water polo at the 1946 Central American and Caribbean Games =

Medalists
gold medal	Netherlands Antilles
silver medal	Colombia
bronze medal	Mexico

Water polo was contested for men only at the 1946 Central American and Caribbean Games in Barranquilla, Colombia.

Event	Gold	Silver	Bronze
Men's water polo	Caribbean Netherlands (AHO)	Colombia (COL)	Mexico (MEX)
