= Nara Falcón =

Mexican synchronized swimmer

Personal information
- Full name: Nara Lorena Falcón Artega
- Nationality: Mexico
- Born: 19 December 1982 (age 43) Mexico City, Mexico
- Height: 168 cm (5 ft 6 in)
- Weight: 55 kg (121 lb)

Sport
- Sport: Swimming
- Strokes: Synchronized swimming

Nara Falcón (born 19 December 1982) is a Mexican former synchronized swimmer.

Nara competed in the women's duet at the 2004 Olympic Games with her partner Olga Vargas and finished in sixth place. In 2010 she won the gold medal in duet the FINA world master championships celebrated in Gottemborg In 2012 she won the gold again in trio the FINA world master championships celebrated in Rimini Italy

Since her retirement from the pool, Nara has appeared as a host on several TV shows. The most popular is the Mexican reality TV show La Isla 2014. In Spain, she hosts a daily magazine show called "A las 11 con".
