= Modern pentathlon at the 2010 Central American and Caribbean Games =

- Location: Mayaguez

The Modern Pentathlon competition at the 2010 Central American and Caribbean Games was held in Mayagüez, Puerto Rico.

The tournament was scheduled to be held from 29 to 30 July at the Guatemala City in Guatemala.

== Medal summary ==
Event	Gold	Silver	Bronze
Individual	Oscar Soto (MEX)	Ismael Hernandez (MEX)	Nikkos Papadopolo (GUA)
Team	Guatemala	Mexico	Dominican Republic
