= Volleyball at the 1954 Central American and Caribbean Games =

Men's volleyball was contested at the 1954 Central American and Caribbean Games in Mexico City, Mexico.

Event	Gold	Silver	Bronze
Men's volleyball	Mexico (MEX)	Puerto Rico (PUR)	Cuba (CUB)
