= Volleyball at the 1986 Central American and Caribbean Games =

Volleyball events were contested at the 1986 Central American and Caribbean Games in Santiago de los Caballeros, Dominican Republic.

Event	Gold	Silver	Bronze
Men's volleyball	Cuba (CUB)	Dominican Republic (DOM)	Puerto Rico (PUR)
Women's volleyball	Cuba (CUB)	Mexico (MEX)	Venezuela (VEN)
