= Estadio La Barranquita =

Stadium in Dominican Republic

- Interactive map of Estadio La Barranquita
- Location: Santiago, Dominican Republic
- Coordinates: 19°25′12.21″N 70°43′57.48″W
- Capacity: 20,000
- Surface: grass

Construction
- Opened: 2003

Estadio La Barranquita is a multi-use stadium in Santiago, Dominican Republic. It is currently used mostly for football matches. The stadium holds 20,000.
