= Water polo at the 1938 Central American and Caribbean Games =

- Location: Panama City, Panama

Medalists
gold medal	Jamaica
silver medal	Panama
bronze medal	Puerto Rico

Water polo was contested for men only at the 1938 Central American and Caribbean Games in Panama City, Panama.

Event	Gold	Silver	Bronze
Men's water polo	Jamaica (JAM)	Panama (PAN)	Puerto Rico (PUR)
