= Volleyball at the 1962 Central American and Caribbean Games =

Volleyball events were contested at the 1962 Central American and Caribbean Games in Kingston, Jamaica.

Event	Gold	Silver	Bronze
Men's volleyball	Mexico (MEX)	Dominican Republic (DOM)	Venezuela (VEN)
Women's volleyball	Dominican Republic (DOM)	Puerto Rico (PUR)	Mexico (MEX)
