= Volleyball at the 1930 Central American and Caribbean Games =

Volleyball was contested for men only at the 1930 Central American and Caribbean Games in Havana, Cuba.

Event	Gold	Silver	Bronze
Men's volleyball	Mexico (MEX)	Cuba (CUB)	El Salvador (ESA)
