= Volleyball at the 1946 Central American and Caribbean Games =

Volleyball events were contested at the 1946 Central American and Caribbean Games in Barranquilla, Colombia.

Event	Gold	Silver	Bronze
Men's volleyball	Cuba (CUB)	Puerto Rico (PUR)	Mexico (MEX)
Women's volleyball	Dominican Republic (DOM)	Puerto Rico (PUR)	Mexico (MEX)
