= Volleyball at the 1935 Central American and Caribbean Games =

Volleyball was contested for men only at the 1935 Central American and Caribbean Games in San Salvador, El Salvador.

| Event | Gold | Silver | Bronze |
|---|---|---|---|
| Men's volleyball | Mexico (MEX) | Puerto Rico (PUR) | Cuba (CUB) |
