= Volleyball at the 1990 Central American and Caribbean Games =

Volleyball events were contested at the 1990 Central American and Caribbean Games in Mexico City, Mexico.

Event	Gold	Silver	Bronze
Men's volleyball	Cuba (CUB)	Mexico (MEX)	Venezuela (VEN)
Women's volleyball	Cuba (CUB)	non awarded	Venezuela (VEN)
