= Volleyball at the 2023 Central American and Caribbean Games =

- Venue: Palacio de los Deportes Carlos "El Famoso" Hernández
- Location: (El Salvador) San Salvador
- Dates: 21 June to 8 July

The volleyball competition at the 2023 Central American and Caribbean Games will be held in San Salvador, El Salvador at the Palacio de los Deportes Carlos "El Famoso" Hernández from 23 to 29 June.

== Medal table ==
* Host nation (El Salvador)

Rank	Nation	Gold	Silver	Bronze	Total
1	Dominican Republic (DOM)	1	2	0	3
2	Puerto Rico (PUR)	1	1	1	3
3	Cuba (CUB)	1	0	2	3
4	Mexico (MEX)	1	0	1	2
5	Nicaragua (NCA)	0	1	0	1
Totals (5 entries)		4	4	4	12

== Medal summary ==
=== Beach Volleyball ===
Event	Gold	Silver	Bronze
Men	Mexico (MEX); Juan Virgen; Miguel Sarabia	Nicaragua (NCA); Jefferson Cascante; Rubén Mora	Cuba (CUB); Noslen Díaz; Jorge Alayo
Women	Puerto Rico (PUR); Maria González; Allanis Navas	Dominican Republic (DOM); Bethania Almánzar; Julibeth Payano	Mexico (MEX); Abril Flores; Atenas Gutiérrez

=== Indoor Volleyball ===
Event	Gold	Silver	Bronze
Men	Cuba (CUB); Lyvan Taboada; Marlon Yant; Miguel Gutiírrez; Miguel López; Osniel Mergarejo; Javier Concepción; Yonder García; Endriel Pedroso; Christian Thondike; Jesús Herrera; José Masso; José Gutiérrez	Dominican Republic (DOM); Luke Ramírez; Héctor Cruz; Wilfrido Hernández; Luther Rosario; Juan de Jesús; Mason Matos; Rafael Burgos; Henry Tapia; Enger Mieses; Gerson Toribio; Henry López; Manuel Blondet	Puerto Rico (PUR); Antonio Elias; Dennis Del Valle; Klistan Lawrence; Pedro Nieves; Luis García; Jonathan Rodríguez; Omar Hoyos; Jamal Ellis; Juan Ruíz; Pelegrin Vargas; Ulises Maldonado; Pedro Molina
Women	Dominican Republic (DOM); Yokaty Pérez; Yaneirys Rodríguez; Niverka Marte; Brenda Castillo; Geraldine González; Cándida Arias; Alondra Tapia; Brayelin Martínez; Jineiry Martínez; Vielka Peralta; Gaila González; Yonkaira Peña	Puerto Rico (PUR); Elaine Vázquez; Brittany Abercrombie; Paola Santiago; Shara Venegas; Wilmarie Rivera; Pilar Victoria; Paola Rojas; Genesis Collazo; Neira Ortíz; Andrea Fuentes; Alba Hernández; Karla Santos	Cuba (CUB); Sulian Matienzo; Claudia Tarin; Gretell Moreno; Diaris Pérez; Ailama Cese; Jessica Aguilera; Laura Suárez; Yensy Kindelán; Dayana Martínez; Dezirett Madan; Ellemay Miranda; Thalia Moreno
