= Volleyball at the 1950 Central American and Caribbean Games =

Volleyball was contested for men only at the 1950 Central American and Caribbean Games in Guatemala City, Guatemala.

Event	Gold	Silver	Bronze
Men's volleyball	Mexico (MEX)	Cuba (CUB)	Puerto Rico (PUR)
