= 1986 Central American and Caribbean Games =

Sports events held in the Dominican Republic

XV Central American and Caribbean Games
- Host city: Santiago de los Caballeros
- Country: Dominican Republic
- Edition: 15th
- Nations: 29
- Athletes: 2,963 (2,100 men, 864 women)
- Opening: 24 June 1986
- Closing: 5 July 1986
- Opened by: Salvador Jorge Blanco
- Torch lighter: Salvador Rivas
- Main venue: Estadio La Barranquita

The 15th Central American and Caribbean Games were held in Santiago de los Caballeros in the Dominican Republic from June 24 to July 5, 1986, and included 2,963 athletes from 26 nations, competing in 25 sports.

== Mascot ==
The mascot for the games was Chaguito (short for Santiago – Chago) the donkey.

== Sports ==
- Athletics ()
- Archery ()
- Basketball ()
- Baseball ()
- Boxing ()
- Cycling ()
- Diving ()
- Equestrian ()
- Fencing ()
- Field hockey ()
- Football ()
- Gymnastics ()
- Judo ()
- Rowing ()
- Sailing ()
- Shooting ()
- Swimming ()
- Softball ()
- Synchronized swimming ()
- Table tennis ()
- Tennis ()
- Volleyball ()
- Water polo ()
- Weightlifting ()
- Wrestling ()

== Medal table ==
* Host nation (Dominican Republic)

1986 Central American and Caribbean Games medal table
Rank	Nation	Gold	Silver	Bronze	Total
1	Cuba (CUB)	174	81	44	299
2	Mexico (MEX)	40	49	44	133
3	Venezuela (VEN)	18	42	60	120
4	Puerto Rico (PUR)	13	29	50	92
5	Costa Rica (CRC)	11	0	3	14
6	Colombia (COL)	10	22	37	69
7	Dominican Republic (DOM)*	9	34	27	70
8	Trinidad and Tobago (TTO)	3	6	7	16
9	Jamaica (JAM)	2	8	7	17
10	Guatemala (GUA)	2	4	9	15
11	Bahamas (BAH)	2	4	4	10
12	Panama (PAN)	1	5	11	17
13	U.S. Virgin Islands (VIR)	1	1	2	4
14	Guyana (GUY)	1	1	1	3
15	Suriname (SUR)	1	0	0	1
16	Belize (BLZ)	0	1	0	1
16	Honduras (HON)	0	1	0	1
16	Netherlands Antilles (ANT)	0	1	0	1
19	Barbados (BAR)	0	0	5	5
20	Haiti (HAI)	0	0	1	1
Totals (20 entries)		288	289	312	889
