= 1954 Central American and Caribbean Games =

7th edition of the Central American and Caribbean Games

Central American and Caribbean Sports Games
- Host city: Mexico City
- Country: Mexico
- Edition: 7th
- Nations: 12
- Athletes: 1,150
- Sport: 19
- Opening: 5 March 1954
- Closing: 20 March 1954
- Opened by: Adolfo Ruiz Cortines
- Athlete's Oath: Francisco Valero
- Torch lighter: Amador Terán
- Main venue: Estadio de la Ciudad Universitaria

The seventh Central American and Caribbean Games were held in Mexico City, the capital city of Mexico. The games were held from the 5 March to the 20 March 1954, and included 1,356 athletes from twelve nations.

== Sports ==
- Athletics
- Baseball
- Basketball
- Bowling
- Boxing
- Cycling
- Diving
- Equestrian
- Fencing
- Football
- Golf
- Artistic gymnastics
- Shooting
- Swimming
- Tennis
- Volleyball
- Water polo
- Weightlifting
- Wrestling

== Medal table ==
* Host nation (Mexico)

1954 Central American and Caribbean Games medal table
Rank	Nation	Gold	Silver	Bronze	Total
1	Mexico*	47	42	36	125
2	Cuba	29	19	20	68
3	Venezuela	14	18	21	53
4	Colombia	8	6	9	23
5	Panama	7	7	8	22
6	Puerto Rico	6	9	9	24
7	Jamaica	5	10	4	19
8	Guatemala	3	8	11	22
9	El Salvador	2	1	2	5
10	Netherlands Antilles	1	1	0	2
11	Dominican Republic	0	1	1	2
Totals (11 entries)		122	122	121	365
