= 1959 Central American and Caribbean Games =

8th edition of the Central American and Caribbean Games

Central American and Caribbean Sports Games
- Host city: Caracas, Venezuela
- Edition: 8th
- Nations: 12
- Debuting countries: British Guiana
- Athletes: 1,150
- Sport: 17
- Opening: 6 January 1959
- Closing: 15 January 1959
- Opened by: Wolfgang Larrazábal
- Athlete's Oath: Téodoro Capriles
- Torch lighter: Mauricio Rodríguez
- Main venue: Olympic Stadium

The eighth Central American and Caribbean Games were held in Caracas, Venezuela, and it was the first time this nation had held the Games. The Games were held from 6 January to 15 January 1959 and included 1,150 athletes from twelve nations, competing in seventeen sports.

== Sports ==
- Athletics
- Baseball
- Basketball
- Boxing
- Cycling
- Diving
- Equestrian
- Fencing
- Football
- Artistic gymnastics
- Shooting
- Swimming
- Tennis
- Volleyball
- Water polo
- Weightlifting
- Wrestling

== Medal table ==
* Host nation (Venezuela)

1959 Central American and Caribbean Games medal table
| Rank | Nation | Gold | Silver | Bronze | Total |
|---|---|---|---|---|---|
| 1 | Mexico | 53 | 37 | 42 | 132 |
| 2 | Venezuela* | 35 | 31 | 34 | 100 |
| 3 | Puerto Rico | 9 | 19 | 8 | 36 |
| 4 | Panama | 7 | 6 | 11 | 24 |
| 5 | Colombia | 6 | 10 | 4 | 20 |
| 6 | Netherlands Antilles | 4 | 5 | 3 | 12 |
| 7 | Guatemala | 1 | 5 | 7 | 13 |
| 8 | El Salvador | 1 | 3 | 5 | 9 |
| 9 | Jamaica | 1 | 2 | 1 | 4 |
| 10 | Nicaragua | 0 | 0 | 2 | 2 |
| 11 | Costa Rica | 0 | 0 | 1 | 1 |
| Totals (11 entries) | | 117 | 118 | 118 | 353 |
