= 1962 Central American and Caribbean Games =

9th edition of the Central American and Caribbean Games

Central American and Caribbean Games
- Host city: Kingston
- Country: Jamaica
- Edition: 9th
- Nations: 15
- Athletes: 1,559
- Sport: 16
- Opening: 15 August 1962
- Closing: 28 August 1962
- Opened by: Sir Kenneth Blackburne
- Athlete's Oath: George Kerr
- Torch lighter: Arthur Wint
- Main venue: National Stadium

The ninth Central American and Caribbean Games were held in Kingston, the capital city of Jamaica from August 15 to August 28, 1962. This games included 1,559 athletes from fifteen nations. It took place days after the country had gained independence from the United Kingdom. It is the first and so far only Central American and Caribbean Games to be held in a non-Spanish-speaking country.

== Sports ==
- Athletics
- Baseball
- Basketball
- Boxing
- Cycling
- Diving
- Fencing
- Football
- Golf
- Shooting
- Swimming
- Tennis
- Volleyball
- Water polo
- Weightlifting
- Wrestling

== Medal table ==
* Host nation (Jamaica)

1962 Central American and Caribbean Games medal table
Rank	Nation	Gold	Silver	Bronze	Total
1	Mexico	37	25	27	89
2	Venezuela	15	27	15	57
3	Cuba	12	11	13	36
4	Puerto Rico	11	14	13	38
5	Colombia	10	4	11	25
6	Jamaica*	8	7	8	23
7	Trinidad and Tobago	4	4	7	15
8	Netherlands Antilles	4	3	2	9
9	Bahamas	4	1	1	6
10	Panama	3	7	4	14
11	Dominican Republic	2	1	2	5
12	British Guiana	1	3	2	6
13	Guatemala	1	2	2	5
14	El Salvador	0	2	3	5
15	Barbados	0	1	2	3
Totals (15 entries)		112	112	112	336
