= 2026 Central American and Caribbean Games =

Multi-sport event in Santo Domingo, Dominican Republic

- Emblem of the 2026 Central American and Caribbean Games
- Host city: Santo Domingo
- Country: Dominican Republic
- Motto: The Centennial Games; Spanish: ¡Los Juegos del Centenario!
- Nations: 37
- Athletes: 5722
- Events: 495 in 40 sports (56 disciplines)
- Opening: 24 July 2026
- Closing: 8 August 2026
- Opened by: President Luis Abinader
- Athlete's Oath: Audrys Nin Reyes and Niverka Marte
- Judge's Oath: Maritza Ortiz and Orlando Cruz
- Torch lighter: Félix Sánchez
- Main venue: Estadio Olímpico Félix Sánchez
- Website: jcc2026.org/en

The 2026 Central American and Caribbean Games (Spanish: Juegos Deportivos Centroamericanos y del Caribe Santo Domingo 2026), also known as the 25th Central American and Caribbean Games and commonly referred as Santo Domingo 2026, was the 25th edition of the Central American and Caribbean Games, a quadrennial sports multi-sport event. The Games took place from 24 July to 8 August 2026 in Santo Domingo, the capital and largest city of the Dominican Republic. This was both the 25th edition of the games and centennial anniversary since the inaugural games in 1926.

The members of Centro Caribe Sports voted unanimously to grant the Games to Santo Domingo in their Extraordinary General Assembly in February 2022. It was the third time the games were held in the Dominican Republic after Santo Domingo hosted them in 1974 and Santiago de los Caballeros hosted them in 1986.

In March 2023, the organizers, along with CANOC President Keith Joseph proposed the inclusion of cricket in the event, which is planned to make a return in the 2028 Summer Olympics but, it was ultimately not included in the final program. Esports and skateboarding also made their debut in 2026. Meanwhile, squash made its return for the first time since 2018, alongside water skiing, returning for the first time since 2010.

== Bidding process ==
2026 Central American and Caribbean Games bidding results
City	Country	CACSO votes
Santo Domingo	Dominican Republic	37

== Development and preparation ==
Santo Domingo zone (thirty-two sports)

Venue	Events	Capacity	Status
Estadio Olímpico Félix Sánchez	Athletics (track and field)	27,000	Renovated
Estadio Olímpico Félix Sánchez	Opening Ceremonies	27,000	Renovated
Malecón Avenue	Athletics (marathon)		Existing
Malecón Avenue	Athletics (race walk)		Existing
Malecón Avenue	Cycling (Road)		Existing
Centro Olímpico Juan Pablo Duarte	Aquatics (diving, artistic swimming, swimming)		Renovated
Centro Olímpico Juan Pablo Duarte	Boxing		Renovated
Centro Olímpico Juan Pablo Duarte	Chess		Renovated
Centro Olímpico Juan Pablo Duarte	Cycling (Track)		Renovated
Centro Olímpico Juan Pablo Duarte	Fencing		Renovated
Centro Olímpico Juan Pablo Duarte	Judo		Renovated
Centro Olímpico Juan Pablo Duarte	Karate		Renovated
Centro Olímpico Juan Pablo Duarte	Softball (men's and women's)		Renovated
Centro Olímpico Juan Pablo Duarte	Racquetball		Renovated
Centro Olímpico Juan Pablo Duarte	Taekwondo		Renovated
Centro Olímpico Juan Pablo Duarte	Water polo		Renovated
Centro Olímpico Juan Pablo Duarte	Wrestling		Renovated
Estadio Quisqueya Juan Marichal	Baseball	13,186	Renovated
Dominican Sports Hall of Fame	E-Sports	812	Renovated
Ágora Mall	Squash		Renovated
Arena Banreservas Virgilio Travieso Soto	Basketball and Closing Ceremonies	8,270	
Plaza Bolera	Bowling		Existing
Centro Ecuestre Palmarejo	Equestrian (Dressage, eventing, jumping) and Shooting (Shootgun)	600	Existing
New Horizons School	Dance Artistic Skating, Free Artistic Skating		Existing
Academia Militar Batalla de Las Carreras	Modern Pentathlon		Existing
Polígono de Tiro al Plato El Higüero	Shooting (Trap and Skeet)		Existing
Ciudad Juan Bosch Sports Center	Netball		Additional
Pista de Patinaje del Parque 30 de Mayo	Speed skating		Additional
Sans Souci	Triathlon		Existing
Palacio del Voleibol Prof. Ricardo G. Arias	Volleyball	4,600	Existing
Malecón Deportivo	3×3 basketball		Additional
Malecón Deportivo	Beach volleyball	450	Additional
Malecón Deportivo	Skateboarding Street		Additional

Parque del Este zone (ten sports)

Venue	Events	Capacity	Status
Campo de Tiro con Arco	Archery		Existing
Pabellón de Tenis de Mesa	Badminton	3,700	Existing
Pabellón de Balonmano	Handball		Existing
Pabellón de Gimnasia	Gymnastics (artistic, rhythmic, trampoline)	1,202	Existing
Estadio de Hockey Sobre Césped	Field hockey	200	Existing
Estadio Parque del Este	Rugby sevens	1,000	Existing
Pabellón de Tenis de Mesa	Table tennis	3,700	Existing
Centro Nacional de Tenis	Tennis	3,700	Existing
Pabellón de Halterofilia	Weightlifting	1,202	Renovated

South Zone (one sports)

Venue	Events	Capacity	Status
Punta Salinas Beach, Peravia	Sailing		Existing

East Zone (three sports)

Venue	Events	Capacity	Status
Sans Souci, Santo Domingo Este	Aquatics (Open water swimming)		Existing
Corales Golf Course	Golf		Existing
Catalina Water Ski Lake, Guerra	Water skiing		Existing

Zona Norte (five sports)

Venue	Events	Capacity	Status
Centro de Remo y Canotaje Presa de Rincón	Canoeing	1,600	Existing
Centro de Remo y Canotaje Presa de Rincón	Rowing	1,600	Existing
Pista de BMX La Barranquita	Cycling (BMX)		Existing
Circuito MTB La Barranquita	Cycling (Mountain biking)		Existing
Estadio Complejo Deportivo Moca 85; Estadio Cibao FC; Estadio Olímpico de la Vega	Football	8,000	Existing
Encuentro Beach, Cabarete, Puerto Plata	Surfing		Existing

Non-competitive

Venue	Events	Capacity	Status
Villa Centroamericana y del Caribe	Central American and Caribbean Games Village		Additional
Villa Centroamericana y del Caribe	Media Village		Additional
Villa Centroamericana y del Caribe	International Broadcast Centre		Additional
Villa Centroamericana y del Caribe	Main Press Centre		Additional

=== Organizing committee ===
On 30 May 2022, the Dominican Republic president Luis Abinader swore in the Organizing Committee composed of the first vice-president Felipe Vicini; second vice-president Antonio Acosta; third vice-president José Manuel Ramos; Ministry of Sports Francisco Camacho as Secretary General; treasurer Mercedes Canalda; Minister of Public Works Deligne Ascención; Major of Santo Domingo Carolina Mejía; members Frank Rainieri, Carlos Iglesias and Fernando Langa and the president of the committee, José P. Monegro who claimed that the games would be inclusive, colorful, austere and transparent.

=== Volunteers ===
The National Volunteer Committee of the Dominican Central American and Caribbean Games Organizing Committee announced the recruitment to assist at the Central American and Caribbean Games.

== Torch relay ==
The flame lighting ceremony was held on 11 April, in Teotihuacán, Mexico, attended by the Governor of State of Mexico, Delfina Gómez Álvarez, the president of Centro Caribe Sports, Luis Mejía Oviedo, the mayor of Santo Domingo, Carolina Mejía, the chairman José Monegro, members of the Organizing Committee, and other guests. After the flame was lit, the torch traveled to Santo Domingo on 12 April.

The 2026 Central American and Caribbean Games torch relay started from 6 May to 24 July 2026. It began in the National Palace in Santo Domingo and ended in Estadio Olímpico Félix Sánchez, the main venue of the 2026 Central American and Caribbean Games. It visited the 31 provinces before traveling back to the city of Santo Domingo. The end of the relay was the closing to the 2026 Central American and Caribbean Games opening ceremony.

== Participating countries ==
The following nations participated:

Participating National Olympic Committees
- Antigua and Barbuda (17)
- Aruba (29)
- Bahamas (37)
- Barbados (142)
- Belize (19)
- Bermuda (76)
- British Virgin Islands (12)
- Cayman Islands (15)
- Colombia (475)
- Costa Rica (268)
- Cuba (497)
- Curaçao (36)
- Dominica (6)
- Dominican Republic (702) (host)
- El Salvador (244)
- French Guiana (1)
- Grenada (12)
- Guadeloupe (31)
- Guatemala (476)
- Guyana (43)
- Haiti (37)
- Honduras (108)
- Jamaica (172)
- Martinique (17)
- Mexico (646)
- Nicaragua (144)
- Panama (217)
- Puerto Rico (435)
- Saint Kitts and Nevis (11)
- Saint Lucia (26)
- Saint Vincent and the Grenadines (6)
- Sint Maarten (4)
- Suriname (22)
- Trinidad and Tobago (148)
- Turks and Caicos Islands (8)
- United States Virgin Islands (40)
- Venezuela (543)

== Games ==
The following competitions took place:

2026 Central American and Caribbean Games
- Aquatics
  - Artistic swimming (11)
  - Diving (12)
  - Open water swimming (4)
  - Swimming (42)
  - Water polo (2)
- Archery (10)
- Athletics (50)
- Badminton (6)
- Baseball/Softball
  - Baseball (1)
  - Softball (2)
- Basketball
  - Basketball (2)
  - 3×3 basketball (2)
- Bowling (10)
- Boxing (14)
- Canoeing (14)
- Chess (8)
- Cycling
  - BMX (2)
  - Mountain biking (2)
  - Road (4)
  - Track (12)
- Equestrian
  - Dressage (3)
  - Eventing (2)
  - Jumping (4)
- Esports (3)
- Fencing (12)
- Field hockey (2)
- Football (2)
- Golf (2)
- Gymnastics
  - Artistic (14)
  - Rhythmic (9)
  - Trampoline (5)
- Handball (2)
- Judo (15)
- Karate (14)
- Modern pentathlon (5)
- Netball (1)
- Racquetball (7)
- Roller sports
  - Artistic skating (3)
  - Skateboarding (2)
  - Speed skating (16)
- Rowing (15)
- Rugby sevens (2)
- Sailing (10)
- Shooting (25)
- Squash (7)
- Surfing (6)
- Table tennis (7)
- Taekwondo (20)
- Tennis (7)
- Triathlon (5)
- Volleyball
  - Volleyball (2)
  - Beach volleyball (2)
- Water skiing (10)
- Weightlifting (32)
- Wrestling (18)
  - Freestyle wrestling
  - Greco-Roman wrestling

== Calendar ==
The edition of the schedule was published by National Olympic Committee of The Dominican Republic.

All times and dates use Atlantic Standard Time (UTC-4)

OC	Opening ceremony	●	Event competitions	1	Event finals	CC	Closing ceremony

July/August		20 Mon	21 Tue	22 Wed	23 Thu	24 Fri	25 Sat	26 Sun	27 Mon	28 Tue	29 Wed	30 Thu	31 Fri	1 Sat	2 Sun	3 Mon	4 Tue	5 Wed	6 Thu	7 Fri	8 Sat	Medal Events
Ceremonies						OC															CC	—N/a
Aquatics	Artistic swimming																	3	4	3	1	68
Aquatics	Diving									●	●	3	2	1	3							68
Aquatics	Open water swimming						2	2														68
Aquatics	Swimming									10	10	7	7	8								68
Aquatics	Water polo	●	●	●	●	●	1	1														68
Archery						●	2	2	●	3	3											10
Athletics															4	8	7	9	9	11	1	49
Badminton					●	●	1	●	●	5												6
Baseball/Softball
Baseball/Softball	Baseball												●	●	●	●	●	●	●	1		1
Baseball/Softball	Softball							●	●	●	●	●	1			●	●	●	●	●	1	2
Basketball	Basketball						●	●	●	●	●	●	●	●	1	1						4
Basketball	3×3 Basketball													●	●	2						4
Bowling									2	2	2	●	4									10
Boxing														●	●	●	●	●	●	14		14
Canoeing																		2	6	6		14
Chess							●	●	4	4												8
Cycling	Road cycling						2							1	1							20
Cycling	Track cycling								4	2	2	4										20
Cycling	BMX											2										20
Cycling	Mountain biking													2								20
Equestrian							●	●	2		●	1		2		1	1		2			9
Esports																			●	3		3
Fencing																2	2	2	2	2	2	12
Field hockey								●	●	●	●	●	●	●	●	1	1					2
Football											●	●	●	●	●	●	●	●	1	1		2
Golf							●	●	●	2												2
Gymnastics	Artistic														1	1	2	5	5			28
Gymnastics	Rhythmic							●	3	6												28
Gymnastics	Trampolining								●	5												28
Handball											●	●	●	●	●	●	●	●	1	1		2
Judo							5	4	5	1												15
Karate																		5	5	4		14
Modern pentathlon																	●	2	1	●	2	5
Netball																●	●	●	●	1		1
Racquetball							●	●	●	●	●	5	●	2								7
Roller sports	Artistic skating						●	3														21
Roller sports	Skateboarding																●	2				21
Roller sports	Speed skating									4	2	4	4	2								21
Rowing							2	2	4	3	4											15
Rugby sevens							●	●	2													2
Sailing														●	●	●	●	●	6	4		10
Shooting							●	3		●	3	1			4	4	●	5	3			23
Squash															●	2	●	3	●	2		7
Surfing							●	●	●	●	6											6
Table tennis														●	●	2	●	●	●	5		7
Taekwondo							3	6	6	5												20
Tennis						●	●	●	●	5	●	●	2									7
Triathlon														4		1						5
Volleyball	Beach volleyball						●	●	●	●	●	●	2									4
Volleyball	Volleyball						●	●	●	●	●	1			●	●	●	●	●	1		4
Water skiing							●	2	3	5												10
Weightlifting																		8	8	10	6	32
Wrestling													6	6	6							18
Daily medal events		0	0	0	0	0	18	25	35	62	32	28	28	28	20	25	13	46	53	69	13	495
Cumulative total		0	0	0	0	0	18	43	78	140	172	200	228	256	276	301	314	360	413	482	495	495
July/August		20 Mon	21 Tue	22 Wed	23 Thu	24 Fri	25 Sat	26 Sun	27 Mon	28 Tue	29 Wed	30 Thu	31 Fri	1 Sat	2 Sun	3 Mon	4 Tue	5 Wed	6 Thu	7 Fri	8 Sat	Total events
July/August		July												August								Total events

== Medal table ==
The following is the final medal table. Some sports gave two bronze medals per event and ties were possible. Six countries did not obtain a medal in this edition so, they do not appear in the table.

* Host nation (Dominican Republic)

2026 Central American and Caribbean Games medal table
Rank	Nation	Gold	Silver	Bronze	Total
1	Mexico	167	125	115	407
2	Colombia	91	98	77	266
3	Cuba	51	48	56	155
4	Venezuela	49	70	97	216
5	Dominican Republic*	46	37	67	150
6	Puerto Rico	34	35	55	124
7	Guatemala	18	32	44	94
8	Panama	8	8	8	24
9	Trinidad and Tobago	6	5	10	21
10	El Salvador	6	4	14	24
11	Costa Rica	5	6	15	26
12	Guyana	3	1	2	6
13	Barbados	2	5	2	9
14	Aruba	2	2	7	11
15	Guadeloupe	2	0	3	5
16	Jamaica	1	4	6	11
17	Honduras	1	4	4	9
18	Bermuda	1	1	4	6
19	Haiti	1	1	3	5
20	Grenada	1	0	1	2
21	Nicaragua	0	3	4	7
22	Bahamas	0	2	2	4
23	U.S. Virgin Islands	0	1	3	4
24	Saint Lucia	0	1	1	2
25	Antigua and Barbuda	0	1	0	1
25	British Virgin Islands	0	1	0	1
27	Curaçao	0	0	2	2
28	Belize	0	0	1	1
28	Cayman Islands	0	0	1	1
28	Saint Vincent and the Grenadines	0	0	1	1
28	Suriname	0	0	1	1
Totals (31 entries)		495	495	606	1,596

== Marketing ==
=== Emblem ===
The official emblem and motto for the 2026 Central American and Caribbean Games was unveiled on 8 February 2024 at the Salón A del Centro de Convenciones of the Ministry of Foreign Affairs of the Dominican Republic in Santo Domingo, it takes the form of a silhouette of the geographic region of Central American and the Caribbean.

=== Official song ===
The official song is called "Corazón de fiesta" (Party Heart) and is sung by the urban music group Ilegales. It was composed by their leader Vladimir Dotel and produced and arranged by Antonio González. The music video was directed by Alberto Zayas and filmed at Estadio Olímpico Félix Sánchez. The song was released on July 7, 2026.

=== Mascot ===
Colí the official mascot of the 2026 Central American and Caribbean Games

The official mascot of the games is named Colí. It is inspired by the Hispaniolan Motmot (Todus subulatus), a bird endemic to Hispaniola. Colí symbolizes Dominican authenticity, resilience, and hospitality, as well as a commitment to sustainability and local culture. It was launched on October 13, 2025.

=== Corporate sponsorship ===
Sponsors of the 2026 Central American and Caribbean Games
Official Sponsors
- América Móvil (Claro Dominicana)
- BanReservas
- Bornan Sports Technology
- Sirena
Other Partners
- Agua Planeta Azul
- Arajet
- Baldom
- Barrick Pueblo Viejo
- Café Santo Domingo
- Coca-Cola
- Grupo Corripio (Pinturas Tropical)
- Grupo Ramos
- Hyundai Motor Company
- PepsiCo (Gatorade)

== Media ==
In April 2026, the game's organizing committee reached an agreement with the country's public broadcaster State Radio and Television Corporation (CERTV) to serve as the domestic broadcaster of the Games. It was later announced, that CDN Deportes would cover the opening and closing ceremony, several sports competitions and follow-up of the national team.

== See also ==
- 2003 Pan American Games - Hosted in Santo Domingo.
- 2026 Commonwealth Games - Multi-sport event being held at the same time with some participating countries competing in both events.

Preceded by San Salvador	Central American and Caribbean Games; Santo Domingo; XXV Central American and Caribbean Games (2026)	Succeeded by To be determined
