= Netherlands at the 2013 World Aquatics Championships =

- Flag of the Netherlands
- World Aquatics code: NED
- National federation: Koninklijke Nederlandse Zwembond
- Website: www.knzb.nl

in Barcelona, Spain
- Medals Ranked 17th: Gold 1 Silver 0 Bronze 3 Total 4

World Aquatics Championships appearances
- 1973; 1975; 1978; 1982; 1986; 1991; 1994; 1998; 2001; 2003; 2005; 2007; 2009; 2011; 2013; 2015; 2017; 2019; 2022; 2023; 2024; 2025

The Netherlands competed at the 2013 World Aquatics Championships in Barcelona, Spain between 19 July and 4 August 2013.

== Medalists ==
| Medal | Name | Sport | Event | Date |
|---|---|---|---|---|
| Gold | Ranomi Kromowidjojo | Swimming | Women's 50 m freestyle | 4 August |
| Bronze | Elise Bouwens; Femke Heemskerk; Inge Dekker; Ranomi Kromowidjojo; Esmee Vermeulen* | Swimming | Women's 4 × 100 m freestyle relay | 28 July |
| Bronze | Ranomi Kromowidjojo | Swimming | Women's 100 m freestyle | 2 August |
| Bronze | Ranomi Kromowidjojo | Swimming | Women's 50 m butterfly | 3 August |

== Diving ==
Netherlands qualified four quota places for the following diving events.

Men

| Athlete | Event | Preliminaries | | Semifinals | | Final | |
| Athlete | Event | Points | Rank | Points | Rank | Points | Rank |
|---|---|---|---|---|---|---|---|
| Yorick de Bruijn | 1 m springboard | 289.40 | 32 | — | | did not advance | |
| Yorick de Bruijn | 3 m springboard | 414.70 | 11 Q | 390.05 | 17 | did not advance | |

Women

| Athlete | Event | Preliminaries | | Semifinals | | Final | |
| Athlete | Event | Points | Rank | Points | Rank | Points | Rank |
|---|---|---|---|---|---|---|---|
| Uschi Freitag | 1 m springboard | 239.55 | 10 Q | — | | 254.60 | 8 |
| Celine van Duijn | 1 m springboard | 205.35 | 33 | — | | did not advance | |
| Uschi Freitag | 3 m springboard | 258.25 | 21 | did not advance | | | |
| Inge Jansen | 3 m springboard | 261.70 | 19 | did not advance | | | |
| Inge Jansen; Celine van Duijn | 3 m synchronized springboard | 250.50 | 14 | — | | did not advance | |

== Open water swimming ==
Netherlands qualified a single quota in open water swimming.

| Athlete | Event | Time | Rank |
|---|---|---|---|
| Ferry Weertman | Men's 10 km | 1:49:20.3 | 6 |

== Swimming ==
Dutch swimmers achieved qualifying standards in the following events (up to a maximum of 2 swimmers in each event at the A-standard entry time, and 1 at the B-standard):

Men

| Athlete | Event | Heat | | Semifinal | | Final | |
| Athlete | Event | Time | Rank | Time | Rank | Time | Rank |
|---|---|---|---|---|---|---|---|
| Dion Dreesens | 200 m freestyle | 1:48.50 | =19 | did not advance | | | |
| Bastiaan Lijesen | 50 m backstroke | 24.94 | 6 Q | 24.99 | 9 | did not advance | |
| Bastiaan Lijesen | 100 m backstroke | 54.07 | 9 Q | 53.92 | 11 | did not advance | |
| Sebastiaan Verschuren | 50 m freestyle | 22.78 | 29 | did not advance | | | |
| Sebastiaan Verschuren | 100 m freestyle | 48.88 | 10 Q | 48.73 | 13 | did not advance | |
| Sebastiaan Verschuren | 200 m freestyle | 1:47.24 | 3 Q | 1:47.31 | =8* | did not advance | |

Verschuren tied for the eighth and final spot in the final with Cameron McEvoy from Australia but withdrew from the swimoff to focus on the 100 m freestyle event.

Women

| Athlete | Event | Heat | | Semifinal | | Final | |
| Athlete | Event | Time | Rank | Time | Rank | Time | Rank |
|---|---|---|---|---|---|---|---|
| Inge Dekker | 50 m butterfly | 26.15 | 6 Q | 26.11 | 6 Q | 25.83 | 5 |
| Femke Heemskerk | 50 m freestyle | 25.19 | 14 Q | 25.10 | 14 | did not advance | |
| Femke Heemskerk | 100 m freestyle | 54.21 | =6 Q | 53.68 | 4 Q | 53.67 | 5 |
| Femke Heemskerk | 200 m freestyle | 1:57.44 | 8 Q | 1.56.98 | 11 | did not advance | |
| Ranomi Kromowidjojo | 50 m freestyle | 24.68 | 4 Q | 24.33 | 2 Q | 24.05 | 1st place, gold medalist(s) |
| Ranomi Kromowidjojo | 100 m freestyle | 54.12 | 5 Q | 53.29 | 3 Q | 53.42 | 3rd place, bronze medalist(s) |
| Ranomi Kromowidjojo | 50 m butterfly | 26.31 | 8 Q | 25.68 | 2 Q | 25.53 | 3rd place, bronze medalist(s) |
| Moniek Nijhuis | 50 m breaststroke | 30.82 | 8 Q | 30.61 | 7 Q | 31.31 | 7 |
| Moniek Nijhuis | 100 m breaststroke | 1:08.29 | 14 Q | 1:07.77 | 10 | did not advance | |
| Elise Bouwens; Femke Heemskerk; Inge Dekker; Ranomi Kromowidjojo; Esmee Vermeulen* | 4 × 100 m freestyle relay | 3:38.41 | 6 Q | — | | 3:35.77 | 3rd place, bronze medalist(s) |

== Synchronized swimming ==
Netherlands has qualified twelve synchronized swimmers.

| Athlete | Event | Preliminaries | | Final | |
| Athlete | Event | Points | Rank | Points | Rank |
|---|---|---|---|---|---|
| Margot de Graaf | Solo free routine | 82.510 | 16 | did not advance | |
| Margot de Graaf | Solo technical routine | 83.400 | 13 Q | 83.400 | 13 |
| Ilse Bosman*; Margot de Graaf; Kim Deiman; Nienke Grun; Anouk Horrevorts; Rynske Keur; Christina Maat; Elisabeth Sneeuw; Nadine Struijk; Roxy Swiebel* | Team technical routine | 81.800 | 12 Q | 81.700 | 12 |
| Ilse Bosman; Margot de Graaf; Kim Deiman; Liza Foppen*; Nienke Grun; Anouk Horrevorts; Rynske Keur; Mirthe Kuperus*; Christina Maat; Elisabeth Sneeuw; Nadine Struijk; Roxy Swiebel | Free routine combination | 83.220 | 11 Q | 82.070 | 12 |

== Water polo ==
=== Women's tournament ===
Team roster

- Ilse van der Meijden
- Yasemin Smit
- Marloes Nijhuis
- Biurakn Hakhverdian
- Sabrina van der Sloot
- Nomi Stomphorst
- Iefke van Belkum
- Vivian Sevenich
- Carolina Slagter
- Dagmar Genee
- Lieke Klaassen
- Leonie van der Molen
- Anne Heinis

Group play

| | Pld | W | D | L | GF | GA | GD | Pts |
|---|---|---|---|---|---|---|---|---|
| Russia | 3 | 2 | 1 | 0 | 41 | 24 | +17 | 5 |
| Spain | 3 | 2 | 0 | 1 | 40 | 23 | +17 | 4 |
| Netherlands | 3 | 1 | 1 | 1 | 54 | 29 | +25 | 3 |
| Uzbekistan | 3 | 0 | 0 | 3 | 13 | 72 | −59 | 0 |

| 21 July 2013; 21:30 | Report | Spain | 14–12 | Netherlands | Piscines Bernat Picornell, Barcelona; Attendance: 1,300; Referees: Bianchi (ITA), Bender (GER) |
| 21 July 2013; 21:30 | Report | Score by quarters: 2–4, 5–1, 3–3, 4–4 | | | Piscines Bernat Picornell, Barcelona; Attendance: 1,300; Referees: Bianchi (ITA), Bender (GER) |
| 21 July 2013; 21:30 | Report | Espar, Peña 3 | Goals | Smit 4 | Piscines Bernat Picornell, Barcelona; Attendance: 1,300; Referees: Bianchi (ITA), Bender (GER) |

| 23 July 2013; 20:10 | Report | Uzbekistan | 3–30 | Netherlands | Piscines Bernat Picornell, Barcelona; Attendance: 500; Referees: Makita (JPN), Moller (ARG) |
| 23 July 2013; 20:10 | Report | Score by quarters: 1–7, 0–9, 1–6, 1–8 | | | Piscines Bernat Picornell, Barcelona; Attendance: 500; Referees: Makita (JPN), Moller (ARG) |
| 23 July 2013; 20:10 | Report | three players 1 | Goals | Klaassen 6 | Piscines Bernat Picornell, Barcelona; Attendance: 500; Referees: Makita (JPN), Moller (ARG) |

| 25 July 2013; 17:30 | Report | Russia | 12–12 | Netherlands | Piscines Bernat Picornell, Barcelona; Attendance: 300; Referees: Bianchi (ITA), Stavridis (GRE) |
| 25 July 2013; 17:30 | Report | Score by quarters: 3–3, 4–2, 1–2, 4–5 | | | Piscines Bernat Picornell, Barcelona; Attendance: 300; Referees: Bianchi (ITA), Stavridis (GRE) |
| 25 July 2013; 17:30 | Report | Beliaeva, Ivanova 3 | Goals | Klaassen 4 | Piscines Bernat Picornell, Barcelona; Attendance: 300; Referees: Bianchi (ITA), Stavridis (GRE) |

Round of 16

| 27 July 2013; 12:10 | Report | China | 10–11 | Netherlands | Piscines Bernat Picornell, Barcelona; Attendance: 300; Referees: Bender (GER), Flahive (AUS) |
| 27 July 2013; 12:10 | Report | Score by quarters: 2–2, 2–4, 3–2, 3–3 | | | Piscines Bernat Picornell, Barcelona; Attendance: 300; Referees: Bender (GER), Flahive (AUS) |
| 27 July 2013; 12:10 | Report | Ma Huanhuan 4 | Goals | Smit, Klaassen 3 | Piscines Bernat Picornell, Barcelona; Attendance: 300; Referees: Bender (GER), Flahive (AUS) |

Quarterfinal

| 29 July 2013; 20:15 | Report | Netherlands | 7–11 | Hungary | Piscines Bernat Picornell, Barcelona; Attendance: 1,800; Referees: Moller (ARG), Taylan (TUR) |
| 29 July 2013; 20:15 | Report | Score by quarters: 1–5, 0–2, 3–2, 3–2 | | | Piscines Bernat Picornell, Barcelona; Attendance: 1,800; Referees: Moller (ARG), Taylan (TUR) |
| 29 July 2013; 20:15 | Report | Klaassen 2 | Goals | Keszthelyi 4 | Piscines Bernat Picornell, Barcelona; Attendance: 1,800; Referees: Moller (ARG), Taylan (TUR) |

5th–8th place semifinal

| 31 July 2013; 17:00 | Report | United States | 12–11 | Netherlands | Piscines Bernat Picornell, Barcelona; Attendance: 400; Referees: Peris (CRO), Flahive (AUS) |
| 31 July 2013; 17:00 | Report | Score by quarters: 2–2, 4–3, 3–2, 3–4 | | | Piscines Bernat Picornell, Barcelona; Attendance: 400; Referees: Peris (CRO), Flahive (AUS) |
| 31 July 2013; 17:00 | Report | five players 2 | Goals | Klaassen 4 | Piscines Bernat Picornell, Barcelona; Attendance: 400; Referees: Peris (CRO), Flahive (AUS) |

Seventh place game

| 2 August 2013; 15:00 | Report | Canada | 9–12 | Netherlands | Piscines Bernat Picornell, Barcelona; Attendance: 300; Referees: Vogel (HUN), Naumov (RUS) |
| 2 August 2013; 15:00 | Report | Score by quarters: 1–5, 2–3, 4–3, 2–1 | | | Piscines Bernat Picornell, Barcelona; Attendance: 300; Referees: Vogel (HUN), Naumov (RUS) |
| 2 August 2013; 15:00 | Report | Valin 4 | Goals | Smit, Klaassen 3 | Piscines Bernat Picornell, Barcelona; Attendance: 300; Referees: Vogel (HUN), Naumov (RUS) |

== See also ==
Netherlands at other World Championships in 2013

- Netherlands at the 2013 UCI Road World Championships
- Netherlands at the 2013 World Championships in Athletics
