= Roller sports at the 2026 Central American and Caribbean Games =

- Venue: New Horizons School (artistic); Malecón Deportivo (skateboarding); Academia Militar Batalla de Las Carreras (speed road); Pista de Patinaje del Parque 30 de Mayo (speed track)
- Location: Santo Domingo, Dominican Republic
- Dates: 25–26 July (artistic); 4–5 August (skateboarding); 28 July–1 August (speed)

The roller sports competition at the 2026 Central American and Caribbean Games was held in Santo Domingo, Dominican Republic, from 25 July to 5 August 2026.

== Participating nations ==
Artistic skating

A total of 9 nations qualified athletes. The number of athletes a nation entered is in parentheses beside the name of the country.

- Colombia (3)
- Cuba (3)
- Dominican Republic (3)
- El Salvador (1)
- Guatemala (1)
- Haiti (1)
- Mexico (3)
- Panama (2)
- Venezuela (2)

Skateboarding

A total of 10 nations qualified athletes. The number of athletes a nation entered is in parentheses beside the name of the country.

- Barbados (1)
- Colombia (2)
- Costa Rica (2)
- Dominican Republic (1)
- El Salvador (1)
- Honduras (2)
- Mexico (2)
- Panama (2)
- Puerto Rico (2)
- Venezuela (2)

Speed skating

A total of 9 nations qualified athletes. The number of athletes a nation entered is in parentheses beside the name of the country.

- Colombia (4)
- Costa Rica (2)
- Cuba (4)
- Dominican Republic (4)
- El Salvador (3)
- Guatemala (4)
- Honduras (2)
- Mexico (4)
- Venezuela (4)

== Medal table ==
* Host nation (Dominican Republic)

Rank	Nation	Gold	Silver	Bronze	Total
1	Colombia (COL)	15	6	3	24
2	El Salvador (ESA)	2	2	3	7
3	Guatemala (GUA)	2	2	2	6
4	Mexico (MEX)	1	4	7	12
5	Puerto Rico (PUR)	1	1	0	2
6	Venezuela (VEN)	0	5	6	11
7	Haiti (HAI)	0	1	0	1
Totals (7 entries)		21	21	21	63

== Medal summary ==
=== Artistic skating ===
Event	Gold	Silver	Bronze
Men's free skating	Deivi Rojas; Colombia	Miguel Tovar; Venezuela	Ian Zanteno; Mexico
Women's free skating	Valentina Lomas; Mexico	Paulina Ruiz; Colombia	Victoria Karp; El Salvador
Women's solo dance	María Paulina Pérez; Colombia	Valentina Lalanne; Haiti	Brenda Salazar; Mexico

=== Skateboarding ===
Event	Gold	Silver	Bronze
Men's street	Jhancarlos González; Colombia	Gabriel Lavallee; Puerto Rico	Brayan Coria; Mexico
Women's street	Esmeralda Butler; Puerto Rico	Geraldine Sánchez; Mexico	María Arias; Venezuela

=== Speed skating (road) ===
Men

Event	Gold	Silver	Bronze
100 m	Faberson Bonilla; Guatemala	Carlos Monsivais; Mexico	Jhon Tascon; Colombia
One lap sprint	Jhon Tascon; Colombia	Roberto García; Venezuela	Sebastián Ruiz; El Salvador
15,000 m elimination	Juan Mantilla; Colombia	Alejandro Castañeda; Mexico	Brandon Torres; Venezuela

Women

Event	Gold	Silver	Bronze
100 m	Ivonne Nóchez; El Salvador	Kollin Castro; Colombia	Dalia Soberanis; Guatemala
One lap sprint	Kollin Castro; Colombia	Ivonne Nóchez; El Salvador	Wilmary Toro; Venezuela
15,000 m elimination	Gabriela Rueda; Colombia	Kollin Castro; Colombia	Valentina Letelier; Mexico

=== Speed skating (track) ===
Men

Event	Gold	Silver	Bronze
200 m dual time trial	Faberson Bonilla; Guatemala	Jhon Tascon; Colombia	Roberto García; Venezuela
500 m + distance sprint	Jhon Tascon; Colombia	Carlos Monsivais; Mexico	Juan Mantilla; Colombia
1000 m sprint	Jhon Tascon; Colombia	Juan Mantilla; Colombia	Sebastián Ruiz; El Salvador
5000 m points	Juan Mantilla; Colombia	Allan López; Guatemala	Alejandro Castañeda; Mexico
10,000 m elimination	Juan Mantilla; Colombia	Allan López; Guatemala	Brandon Torres; Venezuela

Women

Event	Gold	Silver	Bronze
200 m dual time trial	Ivonne Nóchez; El Salvador	Kollin Castro; Colombia	Dalia Soberanis; Guatemala
500 m + distance sprint	Kollin Castro; Colombia	Ivonne Nóchez; El Salvador	Wilmary Toro; Venezuela
1000 m sprint	Kollin Castro; Colombia	Angy Quintero; Venezuela	Gabriela Rueda; Colombia
5000 m points	Gabriela Rueda; Colombia	Angy Quintero; Venezuela	Valentina Letelier; Mexico
10,000 m elimination	Gabriela Rueda; Colombia	Angy Quintero; Venezuela	Valentina Letelier; Mexico
