= Water polo at the 2026 Central American and Caribbean Games =

- Venue: Centro Olímpico Juan Pablo Duarte
- Location: Santo Domingo, Dominican Republic
- Dates: 20–26 July

The water polo competition at the 2026 Central American and Caribbean Games was held in Santo Domingo, Dominican Republic, from 20 to 26 July 2026 at the Centro Olímpico Juan Pablo Duarte.

== Medal table ==
* Host nation (Dominican Republic)

Rank	Nation	Gold	Silver	Bronze	Total
1	Colombia (COL)	1	1	0	2
2	Puerto Rico (PUR)	1	0	1	2
3	Mexico (MEX)	0	1	1	2
Totals (3 entries)		2	2	2	6

== Medal summary ==
Event	Gold	Silver	Bronze
Men's tournament	Puerto Rico; Mauricio Bonilla; Abiel Quiñones; Alan Bayó; José Lubriel; Gerardo Sánchez; Ian Solano; Fernando Zayas; Gabriel Robles; Ángel Rosado; Fabio Mujica; Diego Zayas; Jafet Hernández; Jorge Torres; Timothy Kerr	Colombia; Camilo Camacho; Juan Zuluaga; Juan Hernández; Juan Castillo; Santiago Cuervo; Juan Herrera; Juan Vallejo; Jean López; Sebastian Rendón; Andrés Mora; Simón Buitrago; Carlos Sánchez; Tomás Gil; Alejandro Saldarriaga	Mexico; Roberto Barrera; Rafael Martínez; José Pérez; Diego Lucero; Julio Covarrubias; Iann García; Hazeel Vega; Damián Tavera; Diego Mercado; Pablo Coraza; Matthew Moran; Sebastián Ramírez; Ángel Chapa del Toro; Gael Yépez
Women's tournament	Colombia; Isabela Arboleda; Sara Vanegas; María Restrepo; Carolina Ortega; Antonia Caicedo; Madelyne Ciro; Daniela Marín; Salome Agudelo; Daniela Vargas; Laura Hernández; Eliana Cadavid; Liz López; Isabella Chamorro; Laura Vanegas	Mexico; Alicia Fregoso; Anajulia Ramírez; Dulce Sánchez; Victoria Feliciano; Mercedes Feliciano; Mía Brondo; Maritza Ochoa; Rachel Heredia; Diana Guzmán; Julia Cárdenas; Lucía Carballo; Valeria Martínez; Alma Luna; Paola Sandoval	Puerto Rico; Adriana Cabán; Deliane Rivera; Sabrina Esteves; Amanda Ortiz; Hecmary Andino; Milena Guzmán; Nathalia Meléndez; Gabriella Montalvo; Perla del Mar Román; Frances Vega; Andrea Cardona; Alexandria Schneider; Viviana Zambrana; Anika Nichols

== Men's tournament ==
=== Preliminary round ===
All times are local (UTC-4).

==== Group A ====
Pos	Team	Pld	W	PSW	PSL	L	GF	GA	GD	Pts	Qualification
1	Colombia	3	3	0	0	0	72	28	+44	9	Quarterfinals
2	Venezuela	3	2	0	0	1	58	37	+21	6	Quarterfinals
3	Costa Rica	3	1	0	0	2	51	56	−5	3	Quarterfinals
4	Dominican Republic	3	0	0	0	3	15	75	−60	0	Quarterfinals

Source: JCC 2026
Rules for classification: 1) points; 2) head-to-head points; 3) head-to-head goal difference; 4) head-to-head number of goals scored; 5) Goal difference.

20 July 2026; 16:00	Report	Colombia	17–10	Venezuela	Centro Olímpico Juan Pablo Duarte, Dominican Republic
20 July 2026; 16:00	Report	Score by quarters: 3-2, 8-4, 3-3, 3-1			Centro Olímpico Juan Pablo Duarte, Dominican Republic

20 July 2026; 17:20	Report	Costa Rica	20–8	Dominican Republic	Centro Olímpico Juan Pablo Duarte, Dominican Republic
20 July 2026; 17:20	Report	Score by quarters: 4-0, 6-2, 4-2, 6-4			Centro Olímpico Juan Pablo Duarte, Dominican Republic

21 July 2026; 16:00	Report	Dominican Republic	5–30	Colombia	Centro Olímpico Juan Pablo Duarte, Dominican Republic
21 July 2026; 16:00	Report	Score by quarters: 1–6, 1–8, 3–8, 0–8			Centro Olímpico Juan Pablo Duarte, Dominican Republic

21 July 2026; 17:20	Report	Venezuela	23–18	Costa Rica	Centro Olímpico Juan Pablo Duarte, Dominican Republic
21 July 2026; 17:20	Report	Score by quarters: 5–4, 6–4, 9–4, 3–6			Centro Olímpico Juan Pablo Duarte, Dominican Republic

22 July 2026; 16:00	Report	Colombia	25–13	Costa Rica	Centro Olímpico Juan Pablo Duarte, Dominican Republic
22 July 2026; 16:00	Report	Score by quarters: 7-5, 6-4, 5-3, 7-1			Centro Olímpico Juan Pablo Duarte, Dominican Republic

22 July 2026; 17:20	Report	Dominican Republic	2–25	Venezuela	Centro Olímpico Juan Pablo Duarte, Dominican Republic
22 July 2026; 17:20	Report	Score by quarters: 1-8, 0-3, 0-10, 1-4			Centro Olímpico Juan Pablo Duarte, Dominican Republic

==== Group B ====
Pos	Team	Pld	W	PSW	PSL	L	GF	GA	GD	Pts	Qualification
1	Puerto Rico	3	3	0	0	0	63	24	+39	9	Quarterfinals
2	Mexico	3	2	0	0	1	51	39	+12	6	Quarterfinals
3	Cuba	3	1	0	0	2	48	48	0	3	Quarterfinals
4	Guatemala	3	0	0	0	3	27	78	−51	0	Quarterfinals

Source: JCC 2026
Rules for classification: 1) points; 2) head-to-head points; 3) head-to-head goal difference; 4) head-to-head number of goals scored; 5) Goal difference.

20 July 2026; 16:00	Report	Puerto Rico	16–8	Mexico	Centro Olímpico Juan Pablo Duarte, Dominican Republic
20 July 2026; 16:00	Report	Score by quarters: 4-2, 3-3, 3-2, 6-1			Centro Olímpico Juan Pablo Duarte, Dominican Republic

20 July 2026; 20:00	Report	Cuba	23–13	Guatemala	Centro Olímpico Juan Pablo Duarte, Dominican Republic
20 July 2026; 20:00	Report	Score by quarters: 6-3, 2-6, 6-3, 9-1			Centro Olímpico Juan Pablo Duarte, Dominican Republic

21 July 2026; 18:40	Report	Guatemala	4–29	Puerto Rico	Centro Olímpico Juan Pablo Duarte, Dominican Republic
21 July 2026; 18:40	Report	Score by quarters: 2–6, 0–8, 1–8, 1–7			Centro Olímpico Juan Pablo Duarte, Dominican Republic

21 July 2026; 20:00	Report	Mexico	17–13	Cuba	Centro Olímpico Juan Pablo Duarte, Dominican Republic
21 July 2026; 20:00	Report	Score by quarters: 5–1, 4–5, 4–2, 4–5			Centro Olímpico Juan Pablo Duarte, Dominican Republic

22 July 2026; 18:40	Report	Puerto Rico	18–12	Cuba	Centro Olímpico Juan Pablo Duarte, Dominican Republic
22 July 2026; 18:40	Report	Score by quarters: 5-3, 4-2, 6-5, 3-2			Centro Olímpico Juan Pablo Duarte, Dominican Republic

22 July 2026; 20:00	Report	Guatemala	10–26	Mexico	Centro Olímpico Juan Pablo Duarte, Dominican Republic
22 July 2026; 20:00	Report	Score by quarters: 3-7, 3-6, 1-5, 3-8			Centro Olímpico Juan Pablo Duarte, Dominican Republic

=== Knockout stage ===
Championship bracket

Quarter-finals
23 July
Colombia	33
Guatemala	8
23 July
Mexico	25
Costa Rica	10
23 July
Puerto Rico	28
Dominican Republic	3
23 July
Venezuela	14
Cuba	15

Semi-finals
24 July
Colombia	16
Mexico	11
24 July
Puerto Rico	13
Cuba	12

Final
25 July
Colombia	12
Puerto Rico	16
Third place
25 July
Mexico	17
Cuba	13

5th place bracket

5th–8th place semifinals
24 July
Guatemala	19
Costa Rica	24
24 July
Dominican Republic	5
Venezuela	18

Fifth place game
25 July
Costa Rica	10
Venezuela	25
Seventh place game
25 July
Guatemala	21
Dominican Republic	11

==== Quarterfinals ====
23 July 2026; 15:00	Report	Colombia	33–8	Guatemala	Centro Olímpico Juan Pablo Duarte, Dominican Republic
23 July 2026; 15:00	Report	Score by quarters: 6-2, 10-2, 9-2, 8-2			Centro Olímpico Juan Pablo Duarte, Dominican Republic

23 July 2026; 16:30	Report	Puerto Rico	28–3	Dominican Republic	Centro Olímpico Juan Pablo Duarte, Dominican Republic
23 July 2026; 16:30	Report	Score by quarters: 5-1, 7-0, 10-0, 6-2			Centro Olímpico Juan Pablo Duarte, Dominican Republic

23 July 2026; 18:00	Report	Venezuela	14–15	Cuba	Centro Olímpico Juan Pablo Duarte, Dominican Republic
23 July 2026; 18:00	Report	Score by quarters: 4-5, 5-2, 3-4, 2-4			Centro Olímpico Juan Pablo Duarte, Dominican Republic

23 July 2026; 19:30	Report	Mexico	25–10	Costa Rica	Centro Olímpico Juan Pablo Duarte, Dominican Republic
23 July 2026; 19:30	Report	Score by quarters: 8-3, 7-0, 6-3, 4-4			Centro Olímpico Juan Pablo Duarte, Dominican Republic

==== 5th–8th place semifinals ====
24 July 2026; 11:00	Report	Guatemala	19–24	Costa Rica	Centro Olímpico Juan Pablo Duarte, Dominican Republic
24 July 2026; 11:00	Report	Score by quarters: 4-7, 3-5, 5-7, 4-5			Centro Olímpico Juan Pablo Duarte, Dominican Republic

24 July 2026; 12:30	Report	Dominican Republic	5–18	Venezuela	Centro Olímpico Juan Pablo Duarte, Dominican Republic
24 July 2026; 12:30	Report	Score by quarters: 1-6, 1-3, 2-4, 1-5			Centro Olímpico Juan Pablo Duarte, Dominican Republic

==== Semifinals ====
24 July 2026; 14:00	Report	Colombia	16–11	Mexico	Centro Olímpico Juan Pablo Duarte, Dominican Republic
24 July 2026; 14:00	Report	Score by quarters: 5-4, 2-1, 5-3, 4-3			Centro Olímpico Juan Pablo Duarte, Dominican Republic

24 July 2026; 15:30	Report	Puerto Rico	13–12	Cuba	Centro Olímpico Juan Pablo Duarte, Dominican Republic
24 July 2026; 15:30	Report	Score by quarters: 5-2, 1-4, 5-4, 2-2			Centro Olímpico Juan Pablo Duarte, Dominican Republic

==== Seventh place game ====
25 July 2026; 14:00	Report	Guatemala	21–11	Dominican Republic	Centro Olímpico Juan Pablo Duarte, Dominican Republic
25 July 2026; 14:00	Report	Score by quarters: 3-3, 5-5, 7-1, 6-2			Centro Olímpico Juan Pablo Duarte, Dominican Republic

==== Fifth place game ====
25 July 2026; 15:30	Report	Costa Rica	10–25	Venezuela	Centro Olímpico Juan Pablo Duarte, Dominican Republic
25 July 2026; 15:30	Report	Score by quarters: 4-9, 2-7, 2-4, 2-5			Centro Olímpico Juan Pablo Duarte, Dominican Republic

==== Third place game ====
25 July 2026; 17:00	Report	Mexico	17–13	Cuba	Centro Olímpico Juan Pablo Duarte, Dominican Republic
25 July 2026; 17:00	Report	Score by quarters: 4-1, 3-3, 6-4, 4-5			Centro Olímpico Juan Pablo Duarte, Dominican Republic

==== Final ====
25 July 2026; 18:30	Report	Colombia	12–16	Puerto Rico	Centro Olímpico Juan Pablo Duarte, Dominican Republic
25 July 2026; 18:30	Report	Score by quarters: 4-4, 3-6, 2-3, 3-3			Centro Olímpico Juan Pablo Duarte, Dominican Republic

== Women's tournament ==
=== Preliminary round ===
All times are local (UTC-4).

Pos	Team	Pld	W	PSW	PSL	L	GF	GA	GD	Pts	Qualification
1	Mexico	5	5	0	0	0	99	39	+60	15	Semifinals
2	Puerto Rico	5	4	0	0	1	77	42	+35	12	Semifinals
3	Colombia	5	3	0	0	2	67	46	+21	9	Semifinals
4	Cuba	5	2	0	0	3	51	65	−14	6	Semifinals
5	Venezuela	5	1	0	0	4	35	74	−39	3	5th Place Match
6	Guatemala	5	0	0	0	5	41	104	−63	0	5th Place Match

Source: JCC 2026
Rules for classification: 1) points; 2) head-to-head points; 3) head-to-head goal difference; 4) head-to-head number of goals scored; 5) Goal difference.

20 July 2026; 08:00	Report	Venezuela	5–24	Mexico	Centro Olímpico Juan Pablo Duarte, Dominican Republic
20 July 2026; 08:00	Report	Score by quarters: 0-5, 1-6, 3-5, 1-8			Centro Olímpico Juan Pablo Duarte, Dominican Republic

20 July 2026; 09:20	Report	Colombia	15–8	Cuba	Centro Olímpico Juan Pablo Duarte, Dominican Republic
20 July 2026; 09:20	Report	Score by quarters: 4-3, 4-1, 3-3, 4-1			Centro Olímpico Juan Pablo Duarte, Dominican Republic

20 July 2026; 10:40	Report	Puerto Rico	22–3	Guatemala	Centro Olímpico Juan Pablo Duarte, Dominican Republic
20 July 2026; 10:40	Report	Score by quarters: 6-1, 8-0, 4-1, 4-1			Centro Olímpico Juan Pablo Duarte, Dominican Republic

21 July 2026; 08:00	Report	Colombia	12–3	Venezuela	Centro Olímpico Juan Pablo Duarte, Dominican Republic
21 July 2026; 08:00	Report	Score by quarters: 4-1, 0-1, 5-1, 3-0			Centro Olímpico Juan Pablo Duarte, Dominican Republic

21 July 2026; 09:20	Report	Mexico	18–13	Puerto Rico	Centro Olímpico Juan Pablo Duarte, Dominican Republic
21 July 2026; 09:20	Report	Score by quarters: 6-4, 6-3, 2-2, 4-4			Centro Olímpico Juan Pablo Duarte, Dominican Republic

21 July 2026; 10:40	Report	Guatemala	14–19	Cuba	Centro Olímpico Juan Pablo Duarte, Dominican Republic
21 July 2026; 10:40	Report	Score by quarters: 1-7, 5-3, 3-4, 5-5			Centro Olímpico Juan Pablo Duarte, Dominican Republic

22 July 2026; 08:00	Report	Mexico	30–2	Guatemala	Centro Olímpico Juan Pablo Duarte, Dominican Republic
22 July 2026; 08:00	Report	Score by quarters: 5-2, 7-0, 7-0, 11-0			Centro Olímpico Juan Pablo Duarte, Dominican Republic

22 July 2026; 09:20	Report	Puerto Rico	11–10	Colombia	Centro Olímpico Juan Pablo Duarte, Dominican Republic
22 July 2026; 09:20	Report	Score by quarters: 4-4, 2-1, 3-3, 2-2			Centro Olímpico Juan Pablo Duarte, Dominican Republic

22 July 2026; 10:40	Report	Venezuela	8–10	Cuba	Centro Olímpico Juan Pablo Duarte, Dominican Republic
22 July 2026; 10:40	Report	Score by quarters: 2-2, 1-3, 3-2, 2-3			Centro Olímpico Juan Pablo Duarte, Dominican Republic

23 July 2026; 08:00	Report	Colombia	10–14	Mexico	Centro Olímpico Juan Pablo Duarte, Dominican Republic
23 July 2026; 08:00	Report	Score by quarters: 2-4, 1-4, 5-1, 2-5			Centro Olímpico Juan Pablo Duarte, Dominican Republic

23 July 2026; 09:20	Report	Cuba	5–15	Puerto Rico	Centro Olímpico Juan Pablo Duarte, Dominican Republic
23 July 2026; 09:20	Report	Score by quarters: 3-3, 0-4, 0-5, 2-3			Centro Olímpico Juan Pablo Duarte, Dominican Republic

23 July 2026; 10:40	Report	Guatemala	12–13	Venezuela	Centro Olímpico Juan Pablo Duarte, Dominican Republic
23 July 2026; 10:40	Report	Score by quarters: 6-1, 2-4, 2-5, 2-3			Centro Olímpico Juan Pablo Duarte, Dominican Republic

24 July 2026; 07:00	Report	Puerto Rico	16–6	Venezuela	Centro Olímpico Juan Pablo Duarte, Dominican Republic
24 July 2026; 07:00	Report	Score by quarters: 3-2, 4-0, 4-2, 5-2			Centro Olímpico Juan Pablo Duarte, Dominican Republic

24 July 2026; 08:20	Report	Guatemala	10–20	Colombia	Centro Olímpico Juan Pablo Duarte, Dominican Republic
24 July 2026; 08:20	Report	Score by quarters: 4-4, 3-6, 1-2, 2-8			Centro Olímpico Juan Pablo Duarte, Dominican Republic

24 July 2026; 09:40	Report	Cuba	9–13	Mexico	Centro Olímpico Juan Pablo Duarte, Dominican Republic
24 July 2026; 09:40	Report	Score by quarters: 1-3, 2-3, 3-3, 3-4			Centro Olímpico Juan Pablo Duarte, Dominican Republic

=== Knockout stage ===
Championship bracket

Semi-finals
25 July
Mexico	11
Cuba	3
25 July
Puerto Rico	11
Colombia	13

Final
26 July
Mexico	10
Colombia	11
Third place
26 July
Cuba	4
Puerto Rico	10

==== Semifinals ====
25 July 2026; 08:00	Report	Puerto Rico	11–13	Colombia	Centro Olímpico Juan Pablo Duarte, Dominican Republic
25 July 2026; 08:00	Report	Score by quarters: 4-4, 1-1, 3-1, 3-7			Centro Olímpico Juan Pablo Duarte, Dominican Republic

25 July 2026; 09:30	Report	Mexico	11–3	Cuba	Centro Olímpico Juan Pablo Duarte, Dominican Republic
25 July 2026; 09:30	Report	Score by quarters: 2-1, 4-1, 3-0, 2-1			Centro Olímpico Juan Pablo Duarte, Dominican Republic

==== Fifth place game ====
25 July 2026; 11:00	Report	Venezuela	16–15 (PSO)	Guatemala	Centro Olímpico Juan Pablo Duarte, Dominican Republic
25 July 2026; 11:00	Report	Score by quarters: 4-3, 1-2, 2-2, 5-5 PSO: 4-3			Centro Olímpico Juan Pablo Duarte, Dominican Republic

==== Third place game ====
26 July 2026; 12:30	Report	Cuba	4–10	Puerto Rico	Centro Olímpico Juan Pablo Duarte, Dominican Republic
26 July 2026; 12:30	Report	Score by quarters: 1-4, 2-2, 0-1, 1-3			Centro Olímpico Juan Pablo Duarte, Dominican Republic

==== Final ====
26 July 2026; 14:00	Report	Mexico	10–11	Colombia	Centro Olímpico Juan Pablo Duarte, Dominican Republic
26 July 2026; 14:00	Report	Score by quarters: 2-1, 4-1, 2-5, 2-3			Centro Olímpico Juan Pablo Duarte, Dominican Republic
