= Surfing at the 2026 Central American and Caribbean Games =

- Venue: Encuentro Beach
- Location: Santo Domingo, Dominican Republic
- Dates: 25 – 29 July

The surfing competition at the 2026 Central American and Caribbean Games was held in Santo Domingo, Dominican Republic, from 25 to 29 July 2026 at Encuentro Beach.

== Participating nations ==
A total of 12 nations qualified athletes. The number of athletes a nation entered is in parentheses beside the name of the country.

- Barbados (3)
- Colombia (6)
- Costa Rica (8)
- Dominican Republic (8)
- El Salvador (4)
- Guatemala (5)
- Mexico (6)
- Nicaragua (4)
- Panama (10)
- Puerto Rico (10)
- Trinidad and Tobago (1)
- Venezuela (6)

== Medal table ==
* Host nation (Dominican Republic)

Rank	Nation	Gold	Silver	Bronze	Total
1	Mexico (MEX)	2	1	1	4
2	Puerto Rico (PUR)	1	2	1	4
3	Venezuela (VEN)	1	1	0	2
4	Costa Rica (CRC)	1	0	1	2
5	Colombia (COL)	1	0	0	1
6	Barbados (BAR)	0	1	0	1
6	Panama (PAN)	0	1	0	1
8	Dominican Republic (DOM)*	0	0	1	1
8	El Salvador (ESA)	0	0	1	1
8	Nicaragua (NCA)	0	0	1	1
Totals (10 entries)		6	6	6	18

== Medal summary ==
=== Men's events ===
Event	Gold	Silver	Bronze
Shortboard	Rafael Pereira; Venezuela	José Joaquín López; Venezuela	Samuel Reidy; Costa Rica
Longboard	Jonathan Melendres; Mexico	Agustín Cedeño; Panama	Heriberto Torres; Mexico
SUP Surf	Juan Pablo Melendres; Mexico	Giovanni Bercian; Mexico	Max Torres; Puerto Rico

=== Women's events ===
Event	Gold	Silver	Bronze
Shortboard	Rachel Agüero; Costa Rica	Chelsea Tuach; Barbados	Candelaria Resano; Nicaragua
Longboard	Margarita Conde; Colombia	Jazmine Dean; Puerto Rico	Sindy Portillo; El Salvador
SUP Surf	Mariecarmen Rivera; Puerto Rico	Nimsay García; Puerto Rico	Leoni Perthold; Dominican Republic
