= Basketball at the 2026 Central American and Caribbean Games =

- Venue: Centro Olímpico Juan Pablo Duarte; Malecón Deportivo
- Location: Santo Domingo, Dominican Republic
- Dates: 25 July–3 August

The basketball competition at the 2026 Central American and Caribbean Games was held in Santo Domingo, Dominican Republic, from 25 July to 3 August 2026 at the Centro Olímpico Juan Pablo Duarte (for 5x5) and Malecón Deportivo (for 3x3).

== Participating nations ==
The number of athletes a nation entered is in parentheses beside the name of the country.

=== 5x5 ===
Men

- Belize (12)
- Dominican Republic (12)
- Guatemala (12)
- Jamaica (12)
- Mexico (12)
- Nicaragua (12)
- Panama (12)
- Puerto Rico (12)

Women

- Costa Rica (12)
- Dominican Republic (12)
- El Salvador (12)
- Mexico (12)
- Nicaragua (12)
- Panama (12)
- Puerto Rico (12)
- Trinidad and Tobago (12)

=== 3x3 ===
Men

- Guatemala (4)
- Guyana (4)
- Jamaica (4)
- Mexico (4)
- Puerto Rico (4)
- Saint Kitts and Nevis (4)
- Saint Lucia (4)
- Venezuela (4)

Women

- El Salvador (4)
- Guyana (4)
- Honduras (4)
- Jamaica (4)
- Mexico (4)
- Puerto Rico (4)
- Trinidad and Tobago (4)
- Venezuela (4)

== Medal table ==
* Host nation (Dominican Republic)

Rank	Nation	Gold	Silver	Bronze	Total
1	Dominican Republic (DOM)*	2	1	1	4
1	Puerto Rico (PUR)	2	1	1	4
3	Mexico (MEX)	0	1	0	1
3	Venezuela (VEN)	0	1	0	1
5	Belize (BIZ)	0	0	1	1
5	Guatemala (GUA)	0	0	1	1
Totals (6 entries)		4	4	4	12

== Medal summary ==
=== 5x5 events ===
Event	Gold	Silver	Bronze
Men	Puerto Rico; Adiel López; Dwight Gaines; Mason Fuentes; Alexander Montes; Lenuel Narváez; James Rivera; Justin Román; Rognny Santiago; Elijah Espinosa; Vincent Stewart Jr; Isaiah Brown; Felipe Quiñones	Dominican Republic; Danny Carbuccia; Saniel Montero; Ronald García; Eugri Germán; Cristopher Maldonado; Darrel Mercedes; Marlon Martínez; Ángel Javier; Raúl Peña; Fernando de los Santos; Adrián Brito; Rodaris Romero	Belize; Jason Orosco; Elija Favela; Michael Caceres; Marlon Henry Jr; Wilford Dawson; Devin Moody; Ian Parham; Kelvin Cumberbatch; Tevaughn Dawson; Josiah Moseley; Douglas Langford; Damion Vernon
Women	Puerto Rico; Camila De Pool; Sofía Hernández; Jaida Guerra; Dianne Crespo; Andrea González; Arianis Rivera; Natalia Centeno; Niurka Mirambeaux; Adriana Robles; Sofía Muñoz; Diann Jackson; Desireck Nieves	Mexico; Grecia Martínez; Carol Enríquez; Fernanda Romero; Alex Le Baron; Julianna Medina; Ana Zesati; Ariadna Vidales; Miranda Henry; Crystal Castillo; Johanna Flores; Stephanie Hernández; Giovanna Molinar	Dominican Republic; Anny de Jesús; Camila Ramírez; Leila Núñez; Yarianna Torres; Tyanna Medina; Natalia Valdez; Nataly Santana; Arianna Mercado; Alanna Monte de Oca; Karla Aquino; Loanna Tolentino; Carmela Núñez

=== 3x3 events ===
Event	Gold	Silver	Bronze
Men	Dominican Republic; Shamil Ballas; Ángel Suero; Rayner Moquete; Brayan Almonte	Puerto Rico; Antonio Ralat; Ángel Matías; Jorge Matos; Luis Cuascut	Guatemala; Miguel González; Donaval Ávila Jr; Herlin Rodríguez; David Monterroso
Women	Dominican Republic; Cesarina Capellán; Yadira Polanco; Esmery Martínez; María de la Rosa	Venezuela; Nohelia Chile; Bárbara Pico; Jessuana Machado; Eduglatriz Castro	Puerto Rico; Kaela Hilaire; Geovana Ríos; Adryana Quezada; Leigha Brown
