= Softball at the 2026 Central American and Caribbean Games =

- Venue: Centro Olímpico Juan Pablo Duarte
- Location: Santo Domingo, Dominican Republic
- Dates: 26 July–8 August

The softball competition at the 2026 Central American and Caribbean Games was held in Santo Domingo, Dominican Republic, from 26 July to 8 August 2026 at the Centro Olímpico Juan Pablo Duarte.

== Participating nations ==
A total of eight countries qualified athletes in each event. The number of athletes a nation entered is in parentheses beside the name of the country.

Men

- Aruba (15)
- Colombia (15)
- Cuba (15)
- Dominican Republic (15)
- Guatemala (15)
- Mexico (15)
- Panama (15)
- Venezuela (15)

Women

- Colombia (15)
- Cuba (15)
- Dominican Republic (15)
- El Salvador (15)
- Mexico (15)
- Puerto Rico (15)
- Venezuela (15)
- Virgin Islands (15)

== Medal table ==
* Host nation (Dominican Republic)

Rank	Nation	Gold	Silver	Bronze	Total
1	Dominican Republic (DOM)*	1	0	1	2
2	Puerto Rico (PUR)	1	0	0	1
3	U.S. Virgin Islands (ISV)	0	1	0	1
3	Venezuela (VEN)	0	1	0	1
5	Mexico (MEX)	0	0	1	1
Totals (5 entries)		2	2	2	6

== Medal summary ==
Event	Gold	Silver	Bronze
Men's tournament	Dominican Republic; Luis Hiciano; Elías Valerio; José Reyes; Pablo Figuereo; Michell Rodríguez; Enderson Cabrera; Luiyi Rosario; Jonni Suriel; Edison Ortega; Juan Miguel Arias; Yan Carlos González; Juan Francisco Presinal; Fernando Gómez; Jendry Torres; Joel de Mota	Venezuela; Alvi Paredes; Luis Colombo; Ángel Adames; José Manuel Heredia; David Galeno; Jean Flores; Engelbert Herrera; José Dorantes; Rogelio Sequera; Kleiver Rodríguez; Erwin Díaz; Eduardo Juárez; Yanluis Núñez; José Miguel Blanco; Clevelan Santeliz	Mexico; José Contreras; Ángel Valerio; Jesús René Cardona; Luis Julián Rodríguez; Guillermo Valerio; Rubén Delgadillo; Christian del Valle; Manuel Zepeda; Roberto Sierra; Jesús Jonathan Cardona; Edwin Galván; Alan Osuna; José Refugio Reyes; Abelardo Penuelas; Yahir Yerena
Women's tournament	Puerto Rico; Nia Carter; Aleshia Ocasio; Aleimalee López; Karla Claudio; Taran Alvelo; Macey Cintron; Alanah Rivera; Kathyria García; Isabella Foran; Eliana Enríquez; Kairi Rodríguez; Janelle Martínez; Giselle Juarez; Luna Taboas; Camille Ortiz	U.S. Virgin Islands; Amanda Thompson; Taylor Whiye; Alexis Hastings; Alexandrea Brown; Emily Legette; Autmn Owen; Alexis Handley; Tallen Edwards; Hailey Cripe; Sanaa Thompson; Jada Cooper; Molly Yoo; Emily Kepple; Renee Christan; Courtney Wyche	Dominican Republic; Felicia de los Santos; Graciela Domínguez; Atalyia Rijo; Claudia Santana; Anabel Ulloa; Anyela Gómez; Emmy Segura; Nelia Peralta; María Frías; Eduarda Rocha; Cauris Rincón; Divina Checo; Melody Vizcaino; Brianna Estévez; Marianny Caso
