= Artistic swimming at the 2026 Central American and Caribbean Games =

- Venue: Centro Olímpico Juan Pablo Duarte
- Location: Santo Domingo, Dominican Republic
- Dates: 5–8 August

The artistic swimming competition at the 2026 Central American and Caribbean Games was held in Santo Domingo, Dominican Republic, from 5 to 8 August 2026 at the Centro Olímpico Juan Pablo Duarte.

== Participating nations ==
A total of 10 nations qualified athletes. The number of athletes a nation entered is in parentheses beside the name of the country.

- Aruba (6)
- Colombia (9)
- Costa Rica (2)
- Cuba (4)
- Curaçao (3)
- Dominican Republic (9)
- El Salvador (8)
- Guatemala (3)
- Mexico (9)
- Venezuela (2)

== Medal table ==
* Host nation (Dominican Republic)

Rank	Nation	Gold	Silver	Bronze	Total
1	Mexico (MEX)	8	3	0	11
2	Colombia (COL)	3	6	2	11
3	Aruba (ARU)	0	2	5	7
4	Curaçao (CUW)	0	0	2	2
4	Guatemala (GUA)	0	0	2	2
Totals (5 entries)		11	11	11	33

== Medal summary ==
=== Men's events ===
Event	Gold	Silver	Bronze
Solo technical routine	Gustavo Sánchez; Colombia	Diego Villalobos; Mexico	Kevin García; Guatemala
Solo free routine	Gustavo Sánchez; Colombia	Diego Villalobos; Mexico	Yaqil Alberto; Curaçao

=== Women's events ===
Event	Gold	Silver	Bronze
Solo technical routine	Camila Argumedo; Mexico	Emily Minante; Colombia	Kim Deiman; Aruba
Solo free routine	Itzamary González; Mexico	Kim Deiman; Aruba	Emily Minante; Colombia
Duet technical routine	Mexico; Marla Arellano; Joana Jiménez	Aruba; Kim Deiman; Janneke Dirven	Colombia; Sara Castañeda; Melisa Ceballos
Duet free routine	Mexico; Marla Arellano; Itzamary González	Colombia; Sara Castañeda; Melisa Ceballos	Aruba; Kim Deiman; Janneke Dirven

=== Mixed events ===
Event	Gold	Silver	Bronze
Duet technical routine	Mexico; Diego Villalobos; Itzamary González	Colombia; Gustavo Sánchez; Emily Minante	Guatemala; Rebecca Urías; Kevin García
Duet free routine	Colombia; Gustavo Sánchez; Emily Minante	Mexico; Diego Villalobos; Joana Jiménez	Curaçao; Yaqil Alberto; Ziva King
Team technical routine	Mexico; Marla Arellano; Miranda Barrera; Diego Villalobos; Camila Argumedo; Itzamary González; Regina Alferez; Glenda Inzunza; Joana Jiménez; Pamela Toscano	Colombia; Sara Castañeda; Melisa Ceballos; Tatiana Tobón; Aileen Vélez; Gustavo Sánchez; Emily Minante; Isabella Franco; Laura Rodríguez; Juliana Pacheco	Aruba; Kim Deiman; Mariajose Salazar; Kendra Simon; Nakaylee Didder; Khloe Rafini; Janneke Dirven
Team free routine	Mexico; Marla Arellano; Miranda Barrera; Diego Villalobos; Camila Argumedo; Itzamary González; Regina Alferez; Glenda Inzunza; Joana Jiménez; Pamela Toscano	Colombia; Sara Castañeda; Melisa Ceballos; Tatiana Tobón; Aileen Vélez; Gustavo Sánchez; Emily Minante; Isabella Franco; Laura Rodríguez; Juliana Pacheco	Aruba; Kim Deiman; Mariajose Salazar; Kendra Simon; Nakaylee Didder; Khloe Rafini; Janneke Dirven
Team acrobatic routine	Mexico; Marla Arellano; Miranda Barrera; Diego Villalobos; Camila Argumedo; Itzamary González; Regina Alferez; Glenda Inzunza; Joana Jiménez; Pamela Toscano	Colombia; Sara Castañeda; Melisa Ceballos; Tatiana Tobón; Aileen Vélez; Gustavo Sánchez; Emily Minante; Isabella Franco; Laura Rodríguez; Juliana Pacheco	Aruba; Kim Deiman; Mariajose Salazar; Kendra Simon; Nakaylee Didder; Khloe Rafini; Janneke Dirven
