= Kim Deiman =

Synchronized swimmer (born 1995)

Personal information
- Nationality: Netherlands; Aruba
- Born: 3 July 1995 (age 31)

Sport
- Sport: Swimming
- Strokes: Synchronized swimming
Medal record
Artistic swimming
Representing Aruba
Silver medal – second place	2026 Santo Domingo	Solo free routine
Silver medal – second place	2026 Santo Domingo	Duet technical routine
Bronze medal – third place	2026 Santo Domingo	Solo technical routine
Bronze medal – third place	2026 Santo Domingo	Duet free routine
Bronze medal – third place	2026 Santo Domingo	Team technical routine
Bronze medal – third place	2026 Santo Domingo	Team free routine
Bronze medal – third place	2026 Santo Domingo	Team acrobatic routine

Kim Deiman (born 3 July 1995) is a synchronized swimmer who has represented the Netherlands and Aruba at an international level. Deiman competed for her native Netherlands at the 2012 European Aquatics Championships and 2013 World Aquatics Championships. She won seven medals at the 2026 Central American and Caribbean Games representing Aruba.

== Career ==
Representing the Netherlands, Deiman competed in the combination routine at the 2012 European Aquatics Championships, finishing in sixth place. She then competed in the team technical routine and free routine combination at the 2013 World Aquatics Championships, where her team finished in 12th place in both events.

On the first day of artistic swimming at the 2026 Central American and Caribbean Games, held in Santo Domingo in August, Deiman won a bronze medal in the solo and team technical routine. The second day, she won a silver medal at the solo free routine and duet technical routine. The following day, she won a bronze medal at the duet and team technical routine. On her final day of competition, she won her seventh and final medal in the games, in which she won a bronze medal in the team acrobatic routine.
