= Table tennis at the 2026 Central American and Caribbean Games =

- Venue: Pabellón de Tenis de Mesa
- Location: Santo Domingo, Dominican Republic
- Start date: 1 August 2026
- End date: 7 August 2026

The table tennis competition at the 2026 Central American and Caribbean Games was held in Santo Domingo, Dominican Republic, from 1 to 7 August 2026 at the Pabellón de Tenis de Mesa.

== Medal table ==
* Host nation (Dominican Republic)

Rank	Nation	Gold	Silver	Bronze	Total
1	Puerto Rico (PUR)	4	2	2	8
2	Mexico (MEX)	3	1	4	8
3	Cuba (CUB)	0	3	1	4
4	Colombia (COL)	0	1	1	2
5	Venezuela (VEN)	0	0	3	3
6	Dominican Republic (DOM)*	0	0	2	2
7	Guatemala (GUA)	0	0	1	1
Totals (7 entries)		7	7	14	28

== Medal summary ==
Event	Gold	Silver	Bronze
Men's singles	Rogelio Castro; Mexico	Adrián Pérez; Cuba	Marcos Madrid; Mexico
Men's singles	Rogelio Castro; Mexico	Adrián Pérez; Cuba	Emanuel Otálvaro; Colombia
Women's singles	Adriana Díaz; Puerto Rico	Clío Bárcenas; Mexico	Camila Obando; Venezuela
Women's singles	Adriana Díaz; Puerto Rico	Clío Bárcenas; Mexico	Brianna Burgos; Puerto Rico
Men's doubles	Mexico; Marcos Madrid; Rogelio Castro	Puerto Rico; Steven Moreno; Ángel Naranjo	Guatemala; Luis Carrillo; Sergio Carrillo
Men's doubles	Mexico; Marcos Madrid; Rogelio Castro	Puerto Rico; Steven Moreno; Ángel Naranjo	Cuba; Andy Pereira; Jorge Campos
Women's doubles	Puerto Rico; Brianna Burgos; Adriana Díaz	Colombia; Ana Isaza; Juliana Lozada	Mexico; Arantxa Cossío; Clío Bárcenas
Women's doubles	Puerto Rico; Brianna Burgos; Adriana Díaz	Colombia; Ana Isaza; Juliana Lozada	Venezuela; Roxy González; Camila Obando
Mixed doubles	Puerto Rico; Steven Moreno; Brianna Burgos	Puerto Rico; Ángel Naranjo; Adriana Díaz	Dominican Republic; Ramón Vila; Eva Brito
Mixed doubles	Puerto Rico; Steven Moreno; Brianna Burgos	Puerto Rico; Ángel Naranjo; Adriana Díaz	Mexico; Rogelio Castro; Arantxa Cossío
Men's team	Mexico; Marcos Madrid; Rogelio Castro; Jorge Buenrostro; Darío Arce	Cuba; Andy Pereira; René Méndez; Jorge Campos; Adrián Pérez	Puerto Rico; Steven Moreno; Jabdiel Torres; Enrique Ríos; Ángel Naranjo
Men's team	Mexico; Marcos Madrid; Rogelio Castro; Jorge Buenrostro; Darío Arce	Cuba; Andy Pereira; René Méndez; Jorge Campos; Adrián Pérez	Dominican Republic; Abit Tejeda; Jiaji Wu; Isaac Vila; Ramón Vila
Women's team	Puerto Rico; Brianna Burgos; Alondra Rodríguez; Kristal Meléndez; Adriana Díaz	Cuba; Estela Crespo; Karla Pérez; Rosalba Aguiar; Daniela Fonseca	Mexico; Arantxa Cossío; Mónica Muñoz; Marbella Aceves; Clío Bárcenas
Women's team	Puerto Rico; Brianna Burgos; Alondra Rodríguez; Kristal Meléndez; Adriana Díaz	Cuba; Estela Crespo; Karla Pérez; Rosalba Aguiar; Daniela Fonseca	Venezuela; Nathacha Mata; Roxy González; Camila Obando; Cristina Gómez
