= Esports at the 2026 Central American and Caribbean Games =

Aspect of the 2026 Central American and Caribbean Games

- Venue: Dominican Sports Hall of Fame
- Location: Santo Domingo, Dominican Republic
- Dates: 6–7 August

The Esports competition at the 2026 Central American and Caribbean Games was held in Santo Domingo, Dominican Republic, from 6 to 7 August 2026 at the Dominican Sports Hall of Fame.

== Participating nations ==
A total of 11 nations qualified athletes. The number of athletes a nation entered is in parentheses beside the name of the country.

- Bahamas (1)
- Colombia (7)
- Cuba (1)
- Dominican Republic (7)
- Guatemala (6)
- Honduras (6)
- Jamaica (2)
- Nicaragua (1)
- Panama (7)
- Puerto Rico (1)
- Venezuela (7)

== Medal table ==
* Host nation (Dominican Republic)

Rank	Nation	Gold	Silver	Bronze	Total
1	Dominican Republic (DOM)*	1	1	0	2
1	Panama (PAN)	1	1	0	2
3	Colombia (COL)	1	0	0	1
4	Guatemala (GUA)	0	1	0	1
5	Venezuela (VEN)	0	0	3	3
Totals (5 entries)		3	3	3	9

== Medal summary ==
Event	Gold	Silver	Bronze
eFootball	Jhonnatan Mora; Panama	Arnaldo Vásquez; Guatemala	Carlos Salazar; Venezuela
League of Legends	Colombia; Jairo Urbina; Sergio Bautista; Juan Pablo Arcila; Jhon Guzmán; Víctor Durango	Dominican Republic; Engel Martínez; Juan Dimitry Hernández; Li Yuan Ng; Ronald de León; Sebastián Mercado	Venezuela; Carlos Merentes; Andrés Briceño; David Nannini; José Urrieche; Gerardo León
Street Fighter 6	Saúl Mena; Dominican Republic	Raúl Cogley; Panama	Jorge Velásquez; Venezuela
