= Canoeing at the 2026 Central American and Caribbean Games =

- Venue: Centro de Remo y Canotaje Presa de Rincón
- Location: Santo Domingo, Dominican Republic
- Dates: 5–7 August

The canoeing competition at the 2026 Central American and Caribbean Games was held in Santo Domingo, Dominican Republic, from 5 to 7 August 2026 at the Centro de Remo y Canotaje Presa de Rincón.

== Participating nations ==
A total of 10 nations qualified athletes. The number of athletes a nation entered is in parentheses beside the name of the country.

- Colombia (12)
- Cuba (8)
- Dominican Republic (12)
- Guadeloupe (2)
- Guatemala (12)
- Honduras (1)
- Mexico (12)
- Nicaragua (2)
- Puerto Rico (3)
- Venezuela (9)

== Medal table ==
* Host nation (Dominican Republic)

Rank	Nation	Gold	Silver	Bronze	Total
1	Mexico (MEX)	6	3	4	13
2	Cuba (CUB)	5	0	1	6
3	Venezuela (VEN)	3	4	1	8
4	Colombia (COL)	0	5	5	10
5	Dominican Republic (DOM)*	0	2	1	3
6	Guatemala (GUA)	0	0	2	2
Totals (6 entries)		14	14	14	42

== Medal summary ==
=== Men's events ===
Event	Gold	Silver	Bronze
K1 200m	Daniel Román; Venezuela	Mauricio Figueroa; Mexico	Geduar González; Cuba
K1 1000m	Daniel Ledesma; Mexico	Ray Acuña; Venezuela	Cristian Guerrero; Dominican Republic
K2 500m	Venezuela; Cristian Canache; Ray Acuña	Dominican Republic; Rafael Feliz; Cristian Guerrero	Mexico; Mauricio Figueroa; Daniel Ledesma
K4 500m	Venezuela; Ulises González; Daniel Román; Cristian Canache; Ray Acuña	Dominican Republic; Rafael Feliz; Cristian Guerrero; Juan Plasencia; Ariel Martínez	Mexico; Mauricio Figueroa; Diego Popa; Daniel Ledesma; Jahir Zúñiga
C1 1000m	José Ramón Pelier; Cuba	Guillermo Quirino; Mexico	Daniel Pacheco; Colombia
C2 500m	Cuba; José Ramón Pelier; Tabiany Diéguez	Venezuela; Jeremi Iglesia; Reinaldo Argüello	Colombia; Cristián Ávila; Daniel Pacheco

=== Women's events ===
Event	Gold	Silver	Bronze
K1 200m	Beatriz Briones; Mexico	Yocelin Canache; Venezuela	Diexe Molina; Colombia
K1 500m	Beatriz Briones; Mexico	Diexe Molina; Colombia	Yocelin Canache; Venezuela
K2 500m	Mexico; Beatriz Briones; Maricela Montemayor	Colombia; Diexe Molina; Tatiana Muñoz	Guatemala; Nataly González; Katerin Osorio
K4 500m	Mexico; Beatriz Briones; Ana Hernández; Karen Berrelleza; Maricela Montemayor	Colombia; Diexe Molina; Tatiana Muñoz; Ximena Rodríguez; Mónica Hincapié	Guatemala; Nataly González; Génesis López; Kely Bolvito; Katerin Osorio
C1 200m	Yarisleidis Cirilo; Cuba	Manuela Gómez; Colombia	Ximena Aparicio; Mexico
C2 500m	Cuba; Yarisleidis Cirilo; Diorgina Castillo	Colombia; Madison Velásquez; Manuela Gómez	Mexico; Ximena Aparicio; Cecilia Martínez

=== Mixed events ===
Event	Gold	Silver	Bronze
K2 500m	Mexico; Beatriz Briones; Mauricio Figueroa	Venezuela; Yocelin Canache; Cristian Canache	Colombia; Mónica Hincapié; Sebastián Zapata
C2 500m	Cuba; Yarisleidis Cirilo; José Ramón Pelier	Mexico; Ximena Aparicio; Guillermo Quirino	Colombia; Madison Velásquez; Daniel Pacheco
