= Rugby sevens at the 2026 Central American and Caribbean Games =

- Venue: Estadio Parque del Este
- Location: Santo Domingo, Dominican Republic
- Dates: 25–27 July

The rugby sevens competition at the 2026 Central American and Caribbean Games was held in Santo Domingo, Dominican Republic, from 25 to 27 July 2026 at the Estadio Parque del Este.

== Participating nations ==
A total of eight countries qualified athletes in the men's event and six countries qualified athletes in the women's event. The number of athletes a nation entered is in parentheses beside the name of the country.

Men

- Barbados (12)
- Bermuda (12)
- Colombia (12)
- Costa Rica (12)
- Dominican Republic (12)
- Guatemala (12)
- Trinidad and Tobago (12)
- Venezuela (12)

Women

- Colombia (12)
- Costa Rica (12)
- Dominican Republic (12)
- Guatemala (12)
- Jamaica (12)
- Mexico (12)

== Medal table ==
* Host nation (Dominican Republic)

Rank	Nation	Gold	Silver	Bronze	Total
1	Colombia (COL)	2	0	0	2
2	Mexico (MEX)	0	1	0	1
2	Venezuela (VEN)	0	1	0	1
4	Dominican Republic (DOM)*	0	0	1	1
4	Jamaica (JAM)	0	0	1	1
Totals (5 entries)		2	2	2	6

== Medal summary ==
Event	Gold	Silver	Bronze
Men's tournament	Colombia; Carlos Ruiz; Alejandro Guisao; Andrés Mosquera; Andrés Téllez; Diver Ceballos; Jhojan Ortíz; Jhon Urrutia; Juan Romero; Luis Giraldo; Juan Vallecilla; Bryant Guzmán; Juan Ruiz	Venezuela; Samir Abache; Josué Romero; Eifrenyer Liñan; Francisco Gallardo; Jeferson Davila; José Arrieta; Adrián Madriz; Carlos Herrera; Jackson Davila; Jhonnaiker Hernández; Brayan Rodríguez; Gustavo Carreño	Dominican Republic; Darlin Fernández; David Hightower; Ebenezer Ureña; Pablo Portes; Félix Ulloa; Alex Dockery; Julio Tonnabel; Justin López; Luis Álvarez; Luis Bueno; Randdy de la Rosa; Ulises Kevelier III
Women's tournament	Colombia; Angie Manyoma; Carol Carmona; Daniela Alzate; Eva Pino; Isabella Henry; Jocelin Ruco; Juliana Soto; Karen Jiménez; Laura Mejía; Leidy Soto; Madi Córdoba; Valentina Tapias	Mexico; Marianna Saldaña; Aimée Ramos; Daniela Alvarado; Argelia Rodríguez; Gloria Espindola; Isabel Rodríguez; Isabela González; Karla Ortiz; Laura Rodríguez; Laura Bernal; María Jiménez; Génesis Venegas	Jamaica; Deneya Rowe; Naomi Dodd; Faith Williams; Veronica Blair; Lauryn Walker; Lovell Evans; Mica Moore; Eleanor Bonnett; Mercedes Cole; Shay Morris; Aniya Smith; Rickayla Rochester
