= Cabarete =

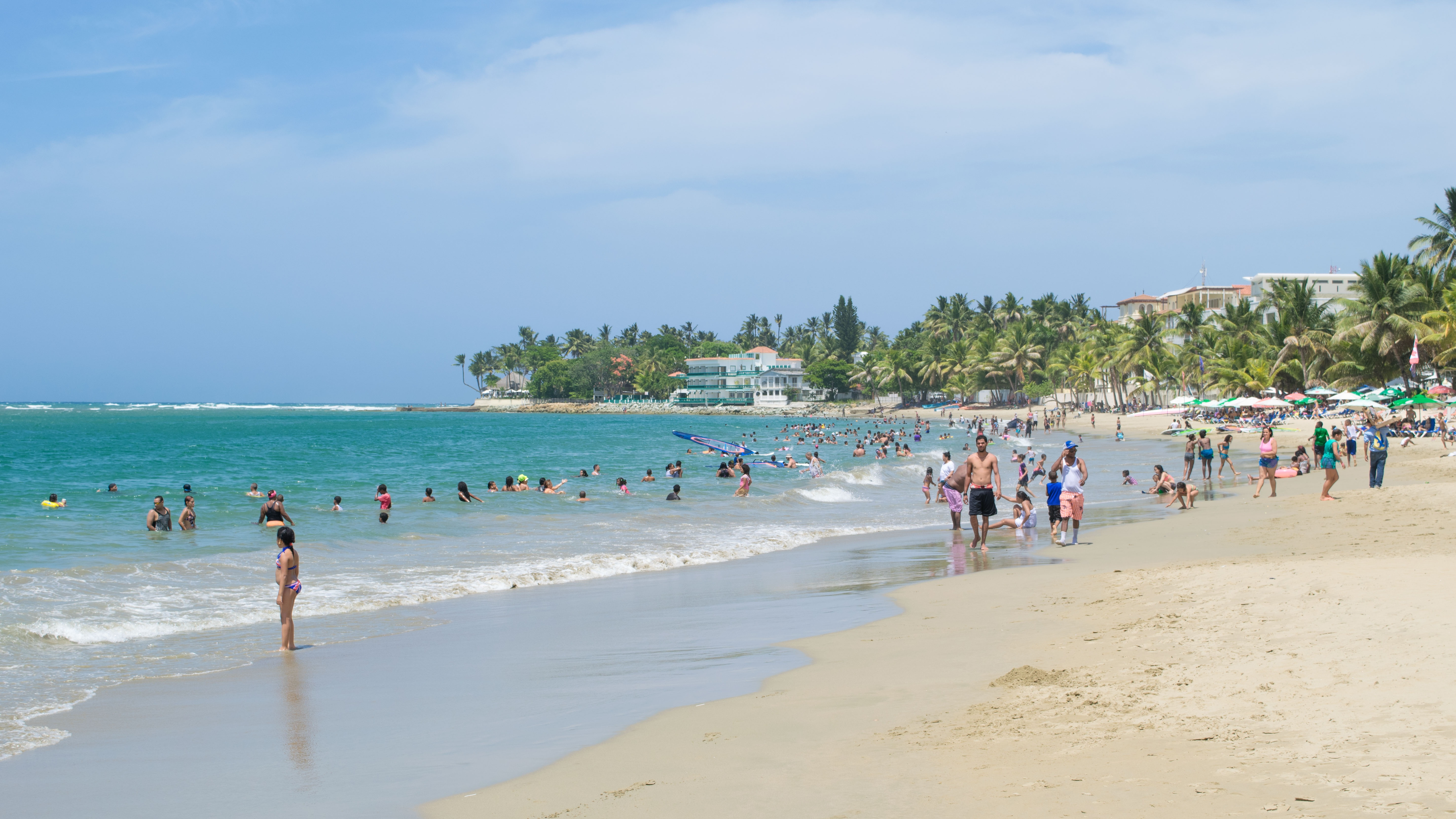
- A beach in Cabarete

- Location within the Dominican Republic
- Coordinates: 19°45′4″N 70°24′30″W
- Country: Dominican Republic
- Province: Puerto Plata

Population (2010)
  - Total: 14,600
- Climate: Af

Cabarete is a town in the Puerto Plata province of the Dominican Republic, noted for its tourism and beaches. It is located on Camino Cinco, locally referred to as Calle Principal, approximately 11 miles (18 km) from the airport of Puerto Plata (POP).

== History ==
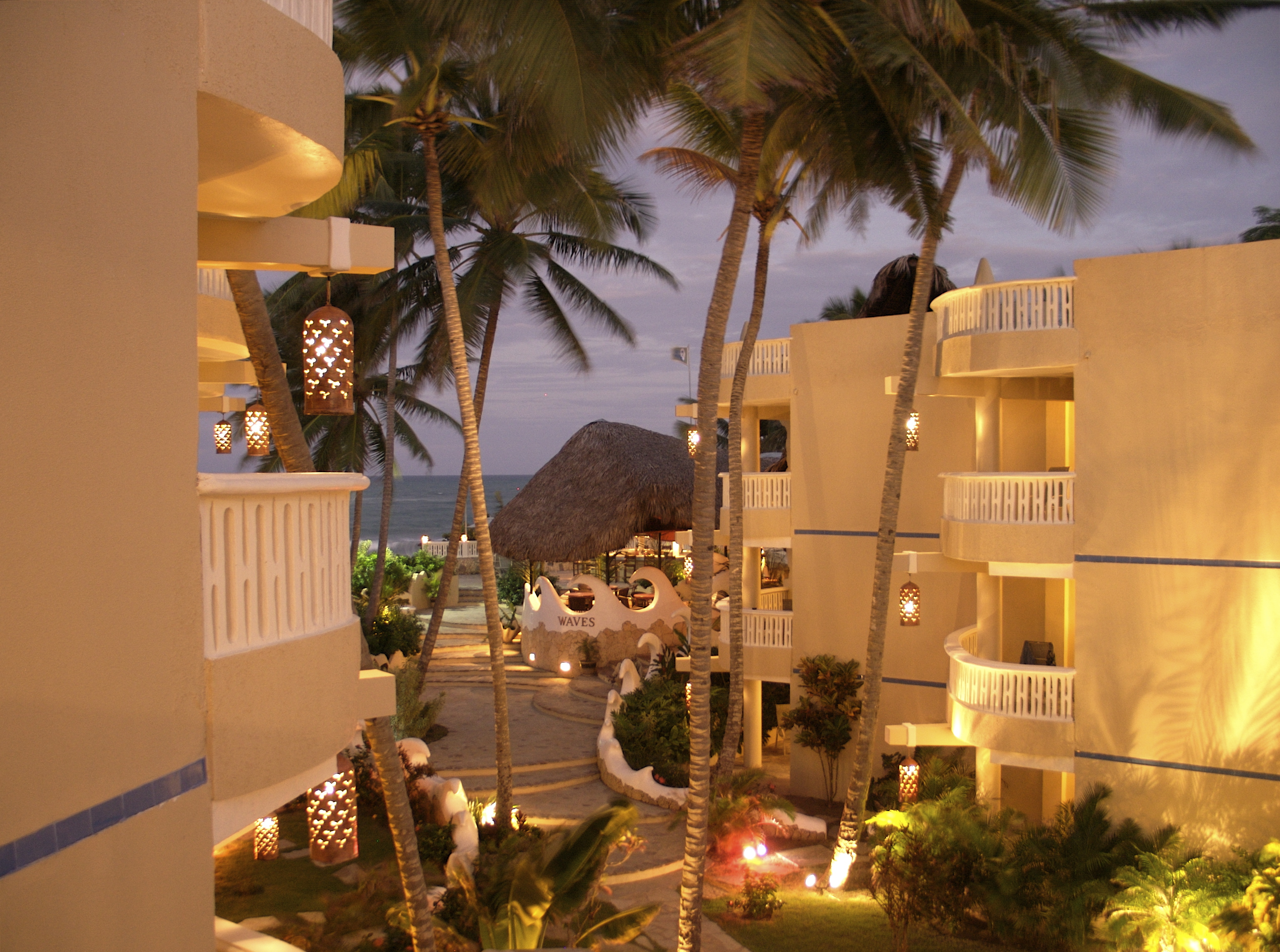
Cabarete nightlife

Cabarete was founded in 1835 by the merchant Zephaniah Kingsley as part of his Mayorasgo de Koka estate, where he moved along with his mixed-race family and 53 slaves he had freed from his Florida plantations and brought here while the island was under Jean Pierre Boyer's administration. He subsequently brought another 100 slaves. Anna Kingsley had a beach cottage by the harbour. Several descendants of the Kingsleys and of the former slaves live in the area today.

== Beaches ==
- Cabarete Bay is considered "town" and has hosted many professional kitesurfing competitions like WorldCup/Copa Mundial, Master of the Ocean, PKRA, and WKL.
- Kite Beach is 1.5 miles to the west of Cabarete Bay and is a kiting beach. It also has a reef break that is visited by stand up paddle surfers.
- Playa Encuentro is 3 miles to the west of Cabarete Bay and is among the most consistent surfing beaches in the Central America, offering opportunities for both beginners and experienced surfers. The beach features several different surf spots, including Bobo's Point, La Izquierda (The Left), and La Derecha (The Main Peak), and a whitewater push area for beginners, each with unique characteristics.
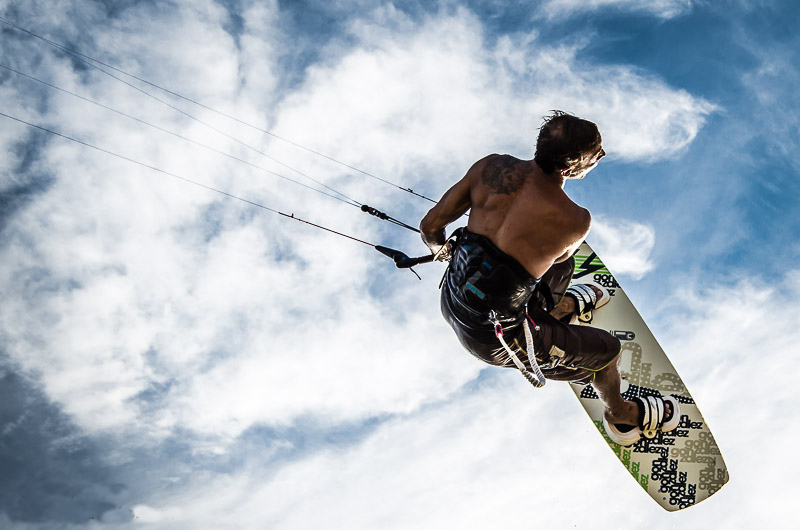
Kiteboarding at Cabarete

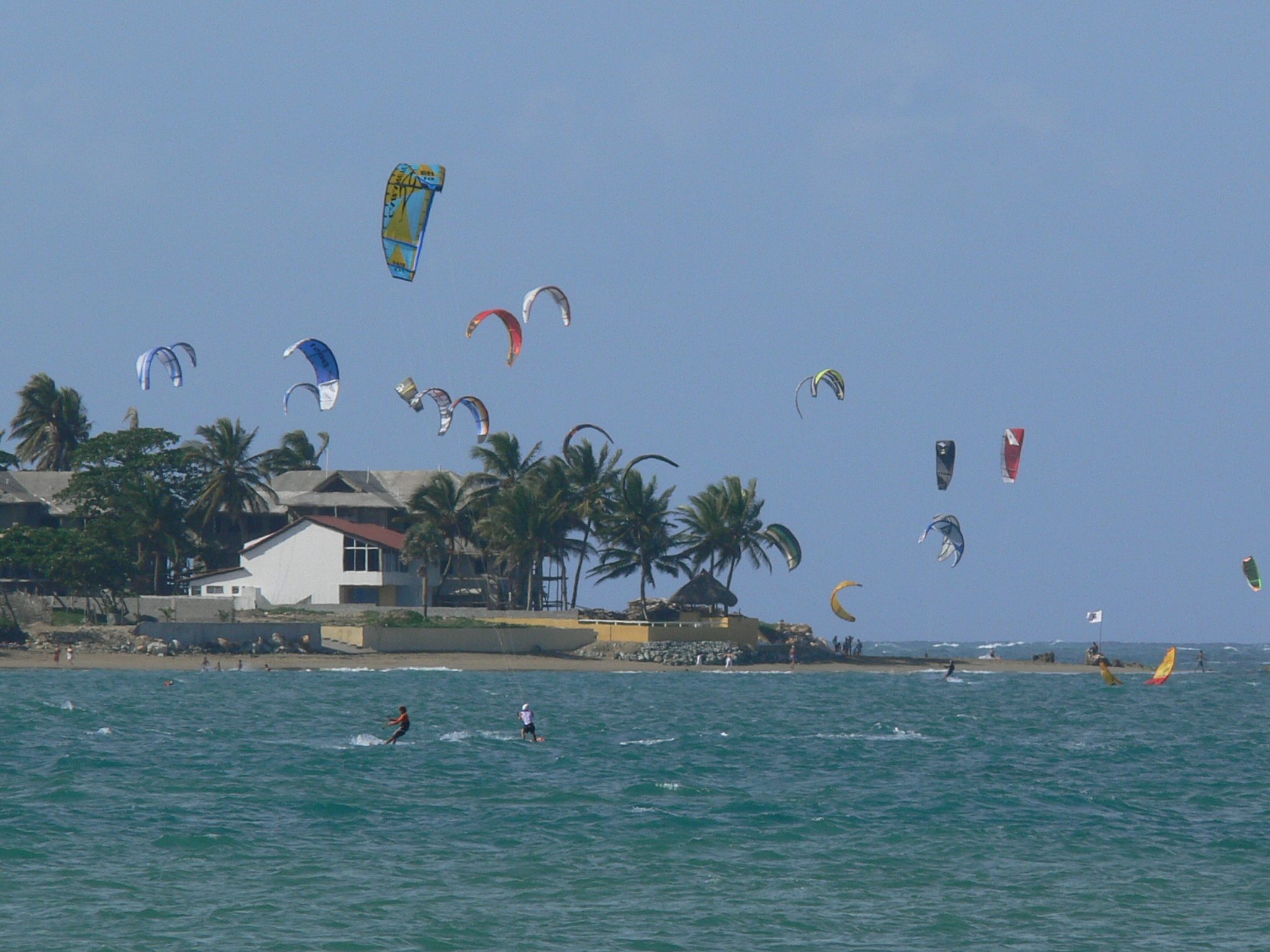
Kitesurfers

== Tourism ==
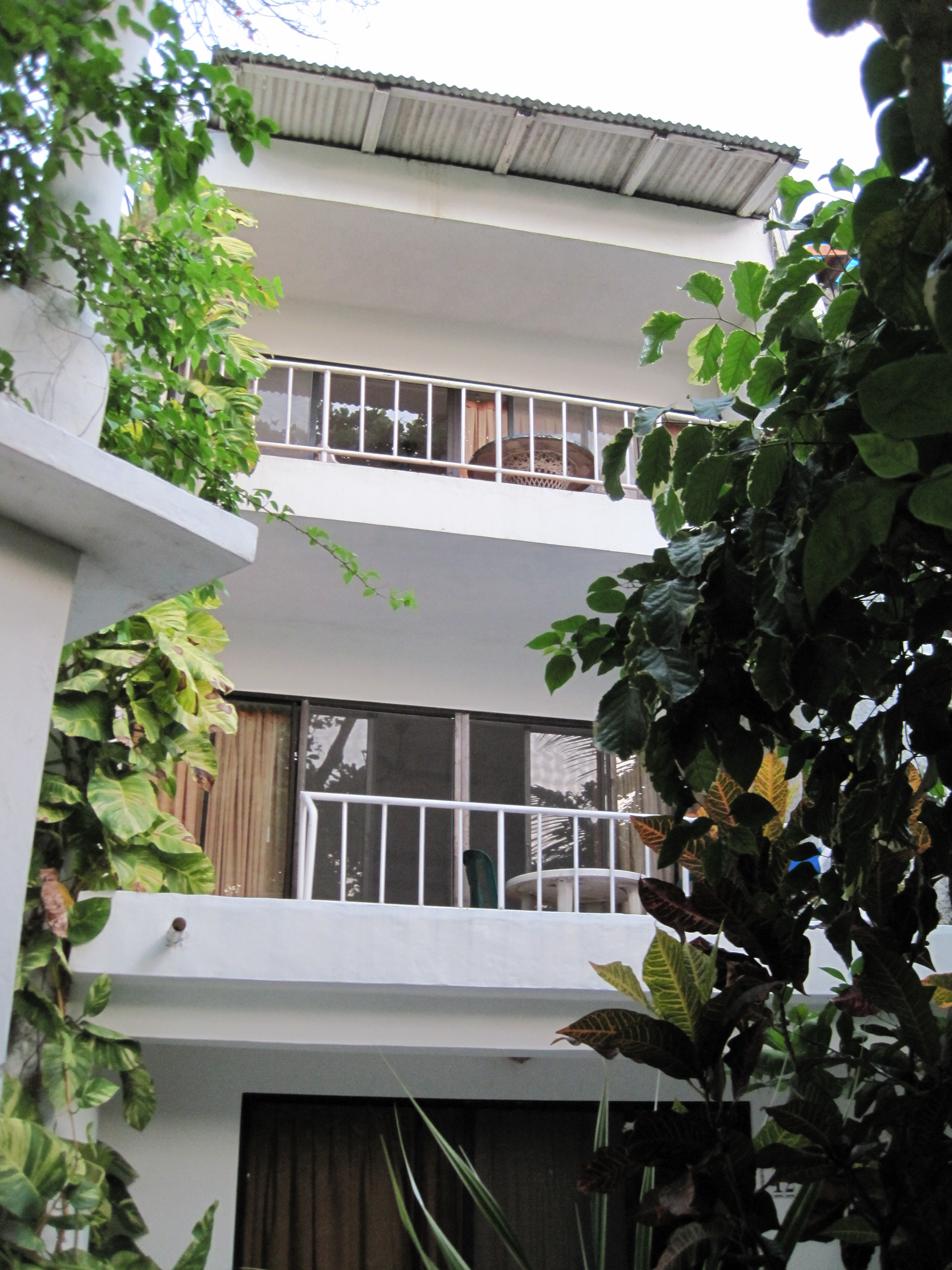
Hotel in Cabarete, Dominican Republic

Cabarete Bay has several times been the site of the "Professional Windsurfing World Cup ", and the "Master of the Ocean" event, which includes contests in the five sports of surfing, windsurfing, kitesurfing, standup paddleboarding, and wing foiling. Playa Encuentro (3 miles west) is among the most popular surfing beaches in the Caribbean, and every year the city is host to important events in these sports. The Cabarete tourist area, located along the Camino Cinco approximately 11 miles (18 km) from Puerto Plata airport, encompasses mountains, lagoons and white sand beaches. It has a large number of condominiums, apartment-hotels, hotels, hostels, shops, gift shops, bars, nightclubs and numerous restaurants.

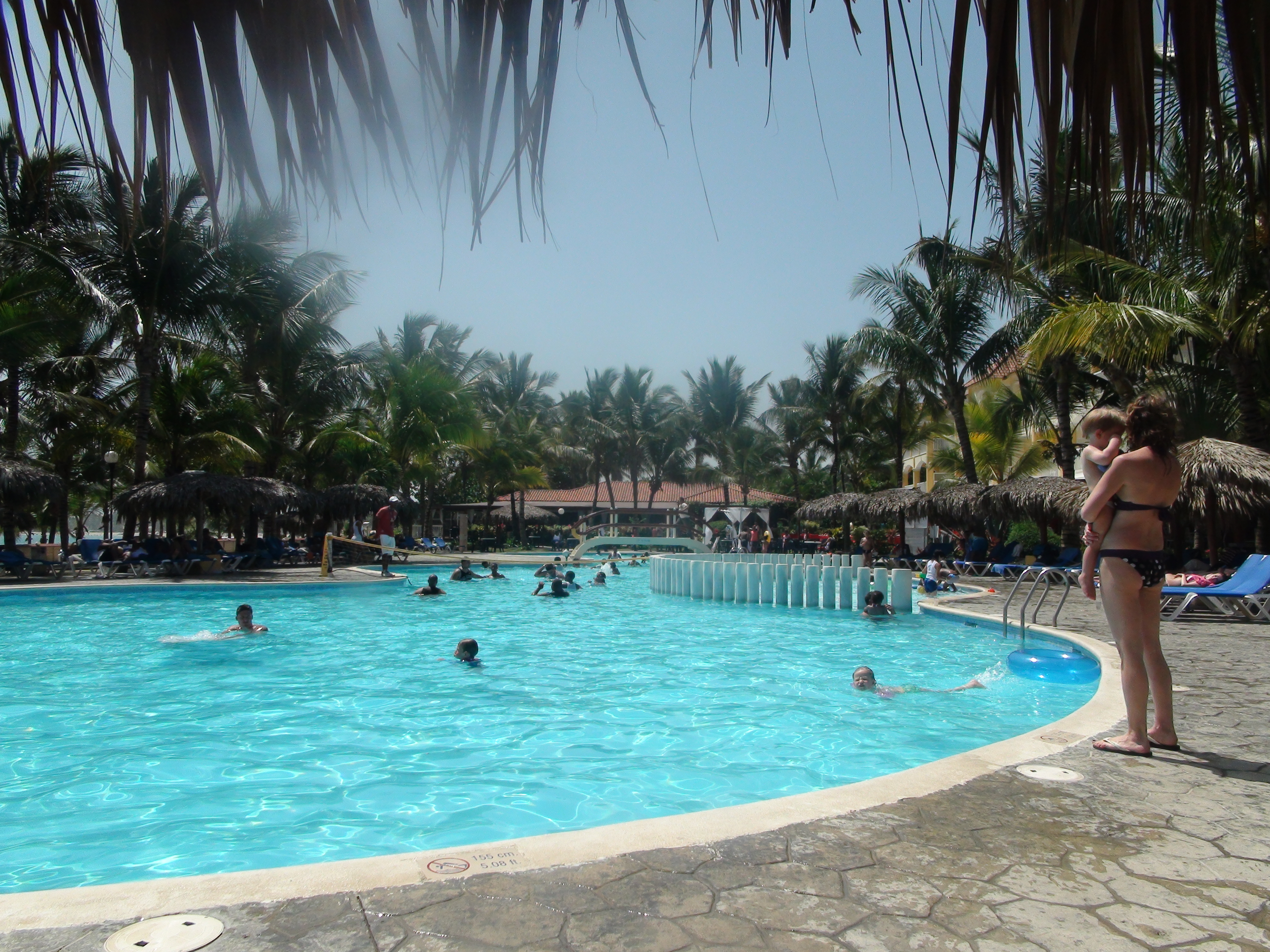
Cabarete, Dominican Republic

Among other attractions in the area are the es:Monumento Natural Lagunas Cabarete y Goleta, a protected area with bays and caves noted for their biodiversity of fauna and flora. This is a tropical karst system located between the foothills of the Cordillera Septentrional and the Atlantic Ocean. Visitors can observe the biodiversity of the Caribbean in its varied routes between sinkholes, mogotes, mangroves swamps and tropical jungle, with opportunities to learn about the variety of tropical fruits and medicinal plants.
