= Cabarete Bay =

Bay in the Dominican Republic

Coordinates: 19.752898°N 70.409961°W

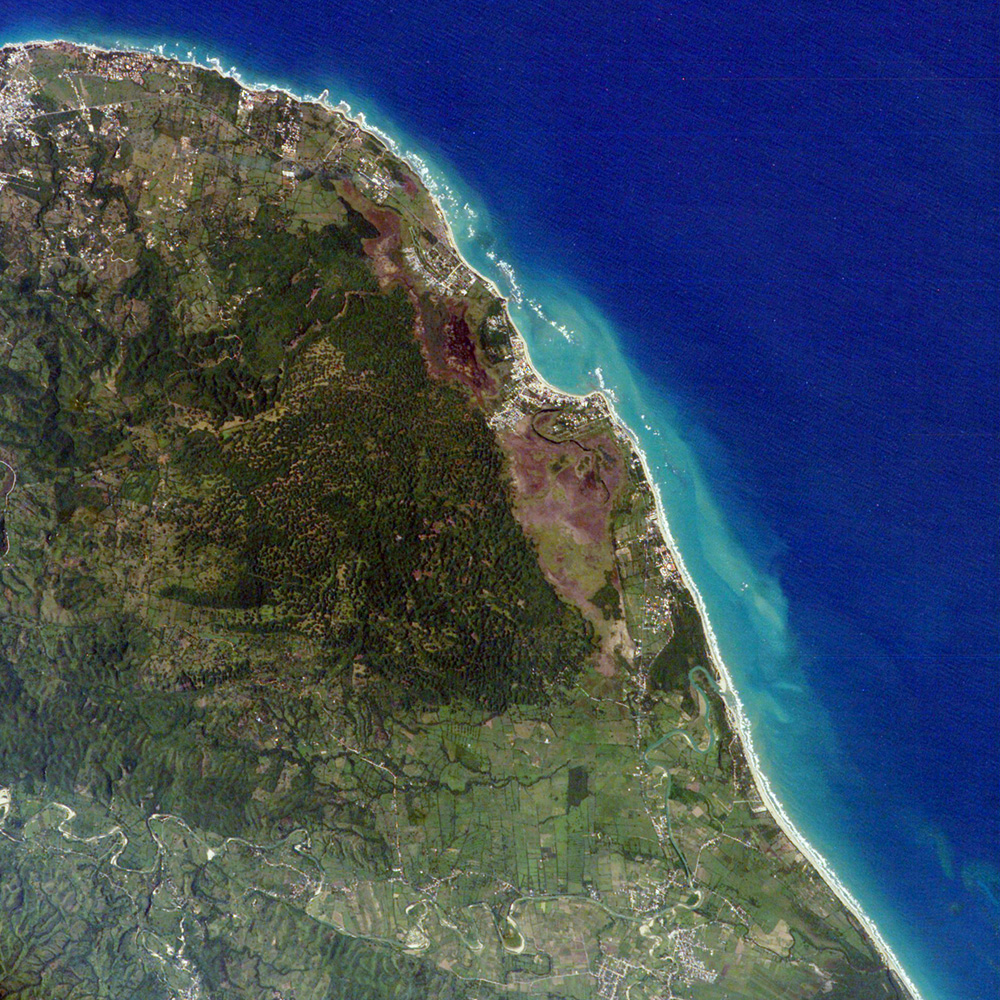
The north coast of the Dominican Republic from space

Cabarete Bay is a bay on the northern coastline of the Dominican Republic. The bay is formed by a barrier coral reef and is a popular destination for kitesurfers.

== Effects of Development ==
Increased development of the city of Cabarete and deforestation of upland regions has resulted in increased urban and sediment runoffs into the bay, impacting the health of the coral reefs. Overfishing of the coral reefs during the 1980s has also contributed to a decline in ecosystem function. Paradoxically, tourism in the Dominican Republic has helped alleviate one aspect of stress on the reefs. Many fishermen now work in tourist hotels for higher pay, decreasing fishing pressure on the coral reefs.

== Village Life and Tourism ==
Cabarete is also a small Caribbean beach village located about 35 minutes away from the Puerto Plata International Airport (Gregorio Luperon Airport - POP) on the northern shore of the Dominican Republic. It is located in between Sosua and La Boca. It is a frequent tropical vacation spot and also a perfect place for surfing and kitesurfing. The village of Cabarete is spread out across the center of a semi-circular beach.

The area is very popular for kitesurfing and windsurfing, with trade winds providing strong, consistent wind. The best months for strong winds are June, July and August when wind speeds average 13-22 knots onshore, followed by the winter months (January-March)
