= Academia Militar Batalla de Las Carreras =

Academia Militar "Batalla de las Carreras"
- Active: 1956–present
- Country: Dominican Republic
- Branch: Dominican Army
- Type: Military academy
- Role: Officer commissioning and professional education
- Garrison/HQ: Santo Domingo Este, Dominican Republic
- Mottos: "Honor, Orgullo, Sacrficio" (Honor, Pride, Sacrifice)
- Anniversaries: April 21 (Battle of Las Carreras)

The Academia Militar "Batalla de las Carreras" (English: "Battle of Las Carreras" Military Academy) is the primary officer candidate school for the Dominican Army. Located in San Isidro, it is responsible for the academic and military formation of future officers of the Dominican Armed Forces.

== History ==
The academy was founded to professionalize the officer corps and was named in honor of the Battle of Las Carreras, fought on April 21, 1849. During this battle, Dominican forces led by General Pedro Santana defeated the Haitian Army, a victory that was crucial for maintaining Dominican independence.

Since its inception, the academy has modernized its curriculum to meet international standards, eventually becoming a higher education institution recognized by the Ministry of Higher Education, Science and Technology (MESCYT).

== Curriculum ==
Cadets undergo a four-year program of study that combines military science with academic coursework.

=== Military Training ===
The military curriculum focuses on small unit tactics, leadership, military law, and physical conditioning. The training is designed to ensure combat readiness and ethical command.

=== Academic Program ===
Upon successful completion of the program, cadets graduate with the rank of Second Lieutenant (Segundo Teniente) and are awarded a bachelor's degree (Licenciatura) in Military Sciences. This degree is equivalent to civilian undergraduate programs under Dominican law.

== Traditions ==
The academy maintains several traditions that define the life of a cadet. New entries are traditionally called "aspirants" until they complete a basic training period to officially become "cadets."

During the graduation ceremony, the President of the Dominican Republic traditionally presents the graduating class with their officer swords, symbolizing the authority and responsibility of command.

== See also ==
- Dominican Army
- Military of the Dominican Republic
