= Encuentro Beach =

Beach in the Dominican Republic

Coordinates: 19.783°N 70.451°W

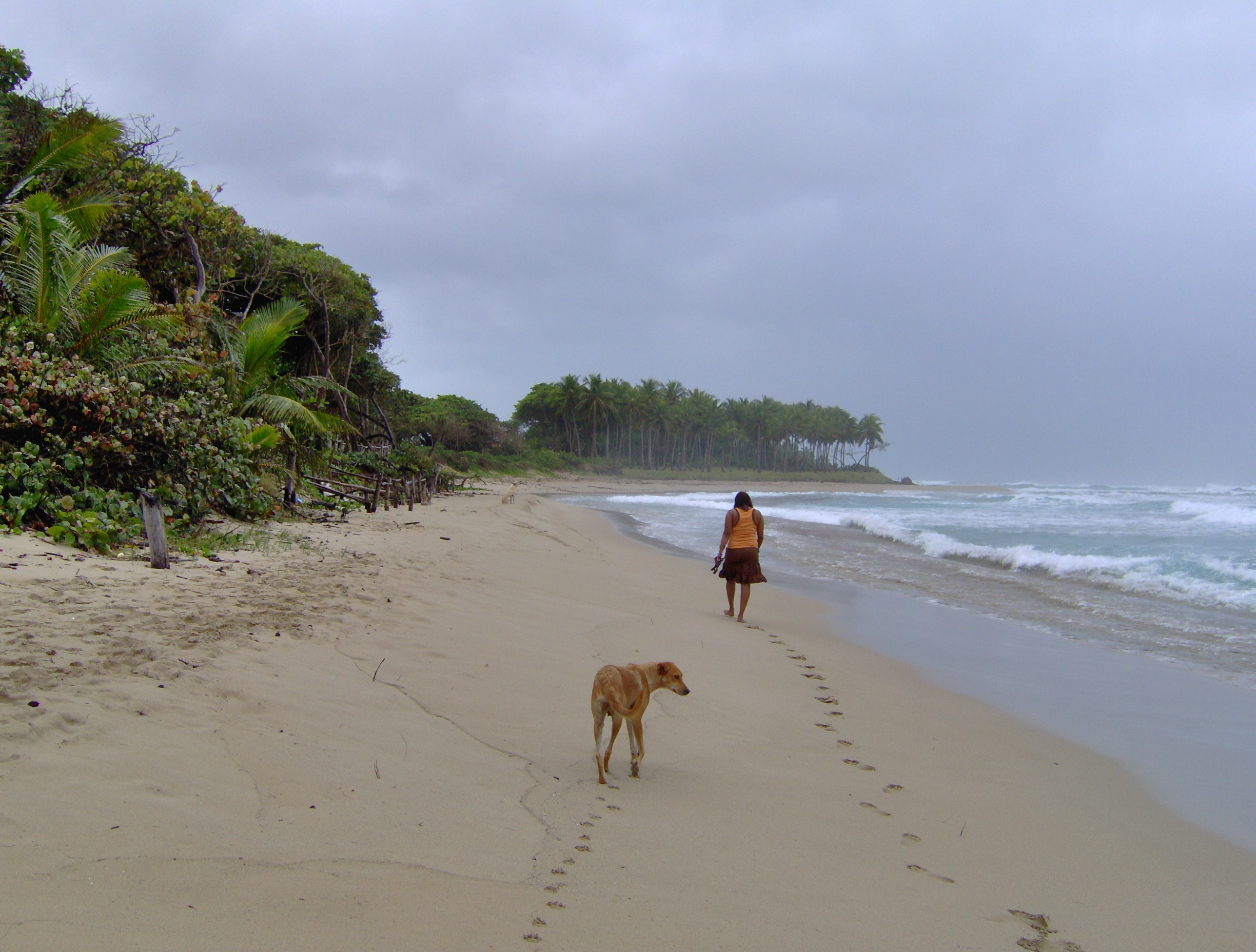
Encuentro Beach

Encuentro Beach is an isolated stretch of beach in the Puerto Plata province of the Dominican Republic. Located between the more heavily populated cities of Sosúa and Cabarete this popular surfing beach is accessible to the public via dirt roads.

Encuentro Beach consists of five distinctive breaks:

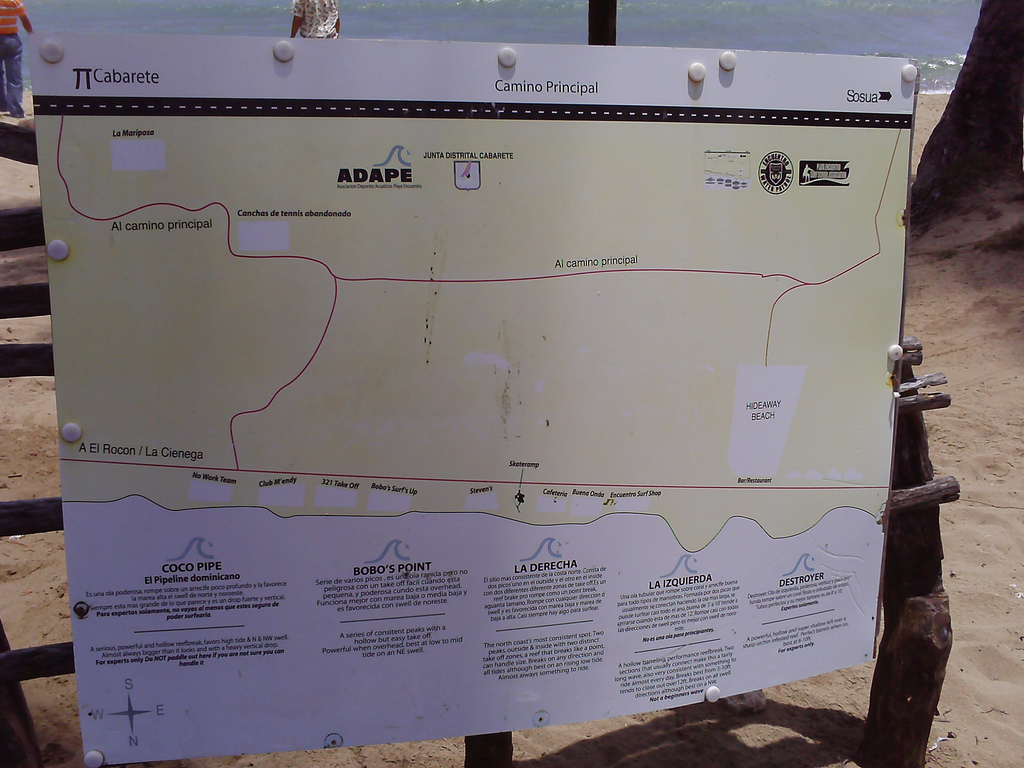
Map of Encuentro Beach, including descriptions of the five distinct breaks

Coco Pipe is a serious, powerful and hollow reefbreak which favors high tide and North or Northwest swell. This wave is almost always bigger than it looks from the beach, with a heavy vertical drop. This was first surfed by Bam Rossiter, who managed to ride a 589 ft wave fakie.

Bobo's Point is a series of consistent peaks with a hollow but easy take off. It is powerful when overhead and best at low to mid tide on a Northeast swell.

La Derecha, meaning "the right", is the North Coast's most consistent surf spot. Two peaks, outside and inside with two distinct take off zones, and a reef that breaks like a point combine to create a wave that breaks with any swell direction and any size.

La Izquierda, meaning "the left", is a hollow barreling performance reefbreak. Two sections that usually connect make up this fairly long wave. It is also very consistent with something to ride almost every day, although the wave tends to close out at heights over 12 feet (3.7 meters).

Destroyer is a powerful, hollow and shallow left, over a sharp reef. This dangerous wave breaks best at 8 to 10 feet (2.4 to 3.0 meters).
