= Centro Olímpico Juan Pablo Duarte =

Centro Olímpico Juan Pablo Duarte Viejo Villa Duarte
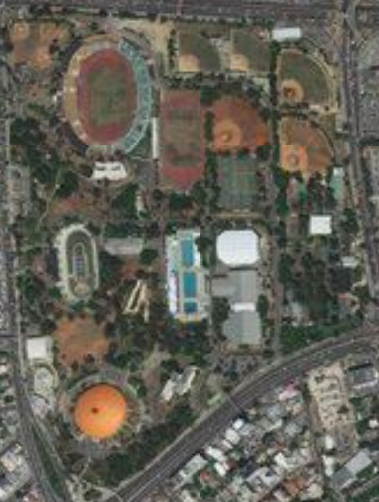
- Satellite view of Centro Olímpico Juan Pablo Duarte by NASA World Wind (2018)

- Location within the Dominican Republic
- Coordinates: 18.478276°N 69.916788°W
- Country: Dominican Republic
- Province: Distrito Nacional

Government
  - Mayor: Carolina Mejía (PRM)

Population (2022)
  - Total: 103
- Demonym: Spanish: Capitaleño (fem. Capitaleña)
- Time zone: UTC−04:00 (AST)
- Postal code: 10122
- Website: adn.gob.do (in Spanish)

Centro Olímpico Juan Pablo Duarte (translation: Juan Pablo Duarte Olympic Center) is a multi-venued athletic complex in Santo Domingo, Dominican Republic. It was initially built for the 1974 Central American and Caribbean Games, and also hosted multiple venues of the 2003 Pan American Games.

As of 2011, the complex has fallen into disrepair and efforts are underway to preserve the complex and maintain it.
